= 2006 Iraqi government formation =

Government formation in Iraq

This article concerns the formation process of the Al Maliki I Government of Iraq in the aftermath of the Iraq National Assembly being elected on December 15, 2005. Due to disputes over alleged vote-rigging the results of the election were only certified by the Independent Electoral Commission of Iraq on February 10, 2006.

Under the constitution of Iraq, the first meeting of the Assembly should have taken place by March 12, 2006, one month after certification of the election. The Assembly should have elected the Speaker in its first session, the President no more than fifteen days later, the Prime Minister no more than fifteen days after the President, and the Cabinet no more than thirty days after the Prime Minister.

If any of these deadlines were not met a new election should have been held. However, similar deadlines have been missed before in Iraq — for example with the drafting of the constitution of Iraq — without the legal consequence occurring.

== First Assembly meeting ==
Negotiations over the new government only started in earnest once the results of the election were in.

Acting President Talabani attempted to convene a meeting of the Assembly for March 12, but this required the assent of acting Vice-President Adel Abdul Mahdi, who initially refused to consent.

The seven parties within the United Iraqi Alliance wrote to Talabani asking him to delay the first session until there was agreement on who should occupy top government positions. They were reluctant to approve the Assembly speaker – expected to be a Sunni – or the President – expected to be a Kurd – before they had agreed to their nominee as prime minister.

However, on March 8, Abdul Mahdi backtracked and agreed to sign the decree, on the basis that it would be a "pro-forma" session that would not discuss the Prime Minister and after advice from the Federal Court of Iraq that the Assembly could be convened via an alternative process if he refused to sign.

Talabani agreed to delay the first meeting until March 19 after the Dawa and Sadr Blocs within the United Iraqi Alliance threatened to boycott the session, which might block quorum. At a meeting with the US Ambassador, the leaders of all the Iraqi parties agreed to bring forward the date to March 16, to prevent the meeting clashing with the Shia festival of Arba'een.

In the event the meeting lasted only thirty minutes and dealt with the swearing-in of the new Assembly members. It was technically left open rather than being adjourned so that the constitutional requirement to elect the Speaker at the first session could be complied with. The Assembly's eldest member, Adnan Pachachi, chaired the session as acting speaker following Arab political tradition.

On April 12 Pachachi announced that he would convene the Assembly again for April 17 in an attempt to break the impasse over the new government. However, on April 16 he agreed to postpone the meeting for "a few days" as the Alliance had objected to the nomination of Tariq al-Hashimi to the post of speaker, calling him "hardline and sectarian".

== Coalition parties ==
Under the newly adopted constitution of Iraq, the Presidency Council of Iraq, Prime Minister of Iraq and Cabinet must have the support of two thirds, or 184, members of the Iraqi National Assembly. The parties who formed the government were:

- United Iraqi Alliance (excluding the Islamic Virtue Party) – 113
- Kurdistani Alliance – 53
- Iraqi Accord Front – 44
- Iraqi National List – 25
- The Upholders of the Message – 2
- Iraqi Turkmen Front – 1
- National Rafidain List – 1
- Total – 240

The 29 members of Sadrist Movement within the United Iraqi Alliance withdrew from the government in November 2006, taking the total down to 211. In August 2007, the main Sunni bloc, Iraqi Accord Front withdrew from the Government. The government currently controls 167 seats out of 275 in the National Assembly.

Opposition parties in the Assembly are:

- Islamic Virtue Party – 15
- Iraqi National Dialogue Front – 11
- Kurdistan Islamic Union – 5
- Reconciliation and Liberation Bloc – 3
- Mithal al-Alusi List – 1
- Yazidi Movement for Reform and Progress – 1

This is the first time that a Sunni Arab-led political group had been included in an Iraqi government since the fall of Saddam Hussein.

=== Negotiations ===
Immediately after the elections, leaders of all four major political groups called for a government of national unity. Kurdish leader Jalal Talabani called for a "government linking everyone, Arabs be they Shias or Sunnis, Kurds and Turkomans" Adnan al-Dulaimi of the Iraqi Accord Front said he was willing to enter into coalition with the Kurdish Alliance, the Iraqi National List or the United Iraqi Alliance.

On 2 January the main Sunni list, the Iraqi Accord Front held meetings with Kurdish representatives in Irbil. They reportedly said they would abandon claims that the elections had been rigged once an international election monitors' review was completed, and agreed an outline of a new national unity government. After meeting with Talabani on 8 January, Adnan al-Dulaimi said that significant headway had been made of forming a coalition government and that "Talabani and I have an identical point of view regarding the formation of a national unity government based on consensus". However al-Dulaimi was attacked by the Iraqi National Dialogue Front headed by Saleh al-Mutlaq who said they had broken an agreement with his and Allawi's lists to not discuss the new government with the Kurds until the electoral results had been reviewed.

=== Iraqi National List ===
The Sadrist Movement party within the United Iraqi Alliance originally opposed including Allawi's list in the new government, saying "Allawi is a red line... Allawi represents the Baathists. He's against us. He's arrested our people."

However, on January 22 the Kurdish leaders called for a government of national unity to include all four largest lists.

On March 12 US Ambassador Zalmay Khalilzad said that Iraqi political leaders had agreed that "there is no redline, in terms of the inclusion of any faction, in the formation of the government".

=== Islamic Virtue Party ===
The Islamic Virtue Party, a member of the United Iraqi Alliance coalition with 15 Assembly members announced May 12, 2006 that it was withdrawing from the government, complaining that the United States was interfering with the formation of the government. It has been pressing for one of its members to be named the new Oil Minister.

=== Iraqi National Dialogue Front ===
Following a suicide bombing in Karbala, Sadrist demonstrators in Baghdad chanted "We're going to crush Saleh al-Mutlaq with our slippers", accusing him of backing the Karbala bombers. Abdul Aziz Al-Hakim, the leader of SCIRI, said the Sunni parties' alleged support for terrorism would "only increase our willingness to exclude" them.

On May 12, 2006, the Iraqi National Dialogue Front said it had decided not to join the government, saying it is too "sectarian". It walked out of the Assembly meeting that agreed the government protesting that "it was formed on the basis of an ethnic and religious proportional system"but said he would "support everything positive that comes from al-Maliki's government"

The party was not included in the cabinet approved on 20 May, but ten days later an Iraqi newspaper, Al-Sabah al-Jadid reported that Maliki was considering a reshuffle to bring the party into the government.

=== Sadrist withdrawal ===
In November 2006 the Sadrist Movement withdrew from the government in protest of the meeting between US President George W. Bush and al-Maliki. This reduced the government's majority to 211 out of 275 seats. The Sadrist were later reported to have started an opposition group with Iraqi National Dialogue Front to campaign for the withdrawal of foreign troops and against federalism.

In January they agreed to rejoin the government, after an all-party committee was agreed to look at a timetable for the withdrawal of US forces.

However, in April they withdrew again, demanding a timetable for withdrawal.

=== Iraqi Accord Front withdrawal ===
On 1 August, the Iraqi Accord Front which consists of 44 members of the Parliament, withdrew from the Government. Al-Hashemi will remain vice-president.

=== Iraqi National List withdrawal ===
Shortly after the IAF withdrew from government, the secularist Iraqi National List announced that their five ministers were suspending their participation in cabinet meetings citing the failure of al-Maliki to respond to the List's demands. Initially, they said they would continue their ministerial work, but three weeks later they withdrew completely. The communist science minister, however, decided to continue in the government.

=== Moderates Front ===
In August 2007, a new alliance was formed, calling themselves the "Moderates Front". This consisted of the four remaining core parties of the al-Maliki government:

- Islamic Dawa Party, led by Prime Minister of Iraq, Nouri al-Maliki
- Supreme Islamic Iraqi Council, which includes Vice-President Adil Abdul-Mahdi
- Kurdistan Democratic Party, led by Iraqi Kurdistan President Massoud Barzani
- Patriotic Union of Kurdistan, led by the President of Iraq, Jalal Talabani

The Iraqi Islamic Party, which includes Vice-President Tariq al-Hashimi, agreed later to join the alliance. The five parties hold around 130 out of 275 members of the Iraqi Council of Representatives.

Dawa and SIIC are Shi'ite Arab Islamist parties, the KDP and PUK are secular Kurdish parties and the IIP is a Sunni Arab Islamist party.

The new alliance agreed to dilute the de-Baathification provisions of the constitution of Iraq, release prisoners who are held without charge, and hold governorate council elections.

== Prime minister ==
=== Initial Alliance nomination ===
Under the constitution, the largest list in the Assembly, the United Iraqi Alliance, has the right to name the Prime Minister. The UIA comprises the following parties:

Split of United Iraqi Alliance seats by party (includes 2 members from The Upholders of the Message who caucus with the UIA)
Party	District Seats	Compensatory Seats	Total
SCIRI & Badr Organization	21	15	36
Sadrist Movement	27	2	29
Islamic Virtue Party	14	1	15
Islamic Dawa Party	13	0	13
Islamic Dawa Party - Iraq Organisation	12	0	12
Independents and others	24	1	25
Total	111	19	130

On 12 February the Alliance selected the incumbent Ibrahim al-Jaafari as their candidate after a close ballot of its 130 assembly members.

Four Alliance members originally put their names forward as candidates:

- Jafaari, the leader of the Islamic Dawa Party
- Adel Abdul Mehdi, the deputy leader and nominee of SCIRI
- Nadim al-Jabiri, the nominee of the Islamic Virtue Party
- Hussain al-Shahristani, an independent

The Alliance was unable to agree on a candidate by consensus, so decided to put it to a vote. al-Jabiri and Shahristani withdrew their candidacies before the vote. Although they were both thought to favour Abdul Mehdi, they both decided not to publicly back either remaining candidate.

The Iraqi newspaper, Al-Sharq al-Awsat, claimed that Iran had exerted pressure on the Alliance to choose Jafaari, and the Sadr Movement threatened violence if Abdul Mahdi was chosen. However, the Iranian conservative newspaper, Baztab, was said to be supporting Abdul-Mahdi who has closer ties to Iran than Jafaari.

The two Assembly members from the Sadrist The Upholders of the Message list were also allowed to vote. One member, Hasan al-Rubai, from the Sadr Movement arrived late so couldn't vote. The result was:

- Jafaari – 64
- Abdul Mehdi – 63
- Blank – 2
- Absent – 1
- Total – 130 (128 from the Alliance and 2 from the Message)

=== Objections ===
Prior to the vote Kurdish leader Jalal Talabani said he "wouldn't object" if Alliance nominated Jafaari.

However, on March 1, 2006, leaders of the Kurdistan Alliance, mainly-Sunni Iraqi Accord Front and secularist Iraqi National List agreed to ask the Alliance to drop Jafaari and chose another candidate for prime minister. This came after deadly sectarian reprisals against Sunnis after the bombing of the Al-Askari Mosque, and after a visit by Jafaari to Turkey on February 28, 2006 that was strongly criticised by Talabani.

A Kurdish leader was quoted saying "he (Jaafari) is not appropriate and they (Sunnis and Kurds) cannot form a cabinet with him as he is not neutral". A Sunni leader was quoted saying "his performance has been below expectations...he was unable to control the security situation... and what has happened in the last few days is a proof of what we have said...the government had been inefficient and Mr Jafaari should give his seat to someone "competent". The Kurdistan Islamic Union said it would back the stance of the Kurdistani Alliance, to avoid conflict with the main Kurdish political forces.

=== Second Alliance nomination ===
At first, Jafaari refused to back down and the stalemate persisted for over six weeks. In April the most senior Shi'ite cleric, Ali al-Sistani intervened, calling for urgent steps to resolve the deadlock in the interests of national unity. On April 8 the Alliance met and reportedly considered Abdul Mehdi, Shahristani and Dawa party members Nouri al-Maliki and Ali al-Adeeb as alternative nominees. However, the meeting ended without agreement, instead mandating a 3-man committee consisting of al-Maliki, Shahristani and Humam Hamoudi, from SCIRI, to discuss the matter with the Kurdistani Alliance and Islamic Accord Front. The Kurdistani Alliance and Iraqi Accord Front both reiterated their rejection of Jafaari two days later, and the Islamic Virtue Party spokesman Sabah al-Saadi publicly suggested that they nominate an alternative to Jaafari, further weakening him.

On April 11, the Al-Hayat newspaper reported that the Sadr Movement, who up to then had been the strongest supporters of Jaafari outside his own Dawa Party, had softened their stance. It indicated they may support one of:

- Jawad al-Maliki
- Ali al-Adeeb
- Mowaffak al-Rubaie or
- Abdul Karim al-`Anizi, member of the Islamic Dawa Party – Iraq Organization

On April 14 it was reported that Mohammed Redha al-Sistani, negotiating on behalf of his father Grand Ayatollah Ali al-Sistani, had brokered an agreement with al-Sadr and Abdul Mehdi. Under this agreement, al-Sadr agreed not to object to dropping Jafaari, and in exchange Abdul Mehdi would not seek the Prime Ministership himself, settling for his existing post of Vice President.

On April 21, the Alliance reached a decision to put nominate Nouri al-Maliki to the post of prime minister.

=== Deputy Prime Ministers ===
On April 17 the Iraqi Accord Front originally nominated Khalaf al-Ulayyan to the post of deputy prime minister, but he was later replaced by Salam al-Zaubai.

The Kurdistani Alliance proposed the second deputy prime minister.

== President ==
Jalal Talabani, current President of Iraq, said prior to the election that he would not seek re-election as president, because it has few powers compared to the Prime Minister. "I'm not ready to be a puppet president of this country", he said. "The president must be partner with the prime minister in ruling Iraq on all levels, foreign affairs, internal everything". However, this has been seen as an indication that he wanted the post to have more powers, rather than him not wanting the post.

On April 12, Iyad al-Samarra'i, a spokesman for the Iraqi Accord Front called for the President to be a Sunni Arab, saying they were unhappy that both the President and Foreign Minister are Kurds. A Kurdistani Alliance representative, Mahmoud Othman responded that the Kurds were sticking by Talabani and were happy to let the matter go to a vote of the Iraqi National Assembly. On April 14 the IAF withdrew their proposal, so Talabani was elected unopposed.

It was reported that Adel Abdul Mahdi agreed to stay on as Vice President rather than continue his bid to become prime minister. On April 17 the Iraqi Accord Front nominated Adnan al-Dulaimi as Vice-President. Iyad Allawi was also proposed for Vice-President but that would result in the Sunni Arab community losing out. Eventually, Tariq Al-Hashimi, secretary-general of the Iraqi Islamic Party, was agreed on as the Sunni Vice President. Talabani, Abdul Mahdi and al-Hashimi were elected as the Presidency Council of Iraq on 2006-04-22, alongside Prime Minister Nouri al-Maliki and Speaker Mahmoud al-Mashhadani.

== Assembly Speaker ==
On April 17 the Iraqi Accord Front nominated Tariq al-Hashimi to be the speaker of the Iraqi National Assembly. However, the United Iraqi Alliance said he was unacceptable as he had "a history of strident rhetoric of a Sunni sectarian sort". Some saw this as a retaliation to the Front's opposition to the nomination of Jaafari as prime minister.

On April 22 the Assembly elected Mahmoud al-Mashhadani as the Speaker in a secret ballot, with 159 votes in favour, 97 spoilt ballots and 10 abstentions.

Khaled al-Attiyah from the United Iraqi Alliance and Aref Tayfour from the Kurdistani Alliance were elected Deputy Speakers.

On May 28 the Assembly went into closed session to debate the internal rules of the Assembly. The United Iraqi Alliance and Kurdistani Alliance wanted the Speaker to have to consult his deputies before making any decisions, a rule fiercely opposed by the Iraqi Accord Front.

In June 2007 the Council of Representatives asked Mashhadani to resign after a Shiite Turkoman lawmaker, Firyad Mohammed Omar, was dragged into an unused office and detained by the speaker's security guards. Attiyah was appointed acting speaker and the Iraqi Accord Front was asked to nominate a replacement within a week.

== Ministers ==
On May 20, 2006 the Iraqi National Assembly approved the following cabinet proposed by Prime Minister Nouri al-Maliki. The Cabinet included three temporary ministers of Defense, Interior and National Security who were replaced after agreement was reached on who would fill these places.

There are four women in the 37-member cabinet: Narmin Othman, Bayan Dizayi, Wijdan Michael, and Faten Mahmoud.

Cabinet Ministers:

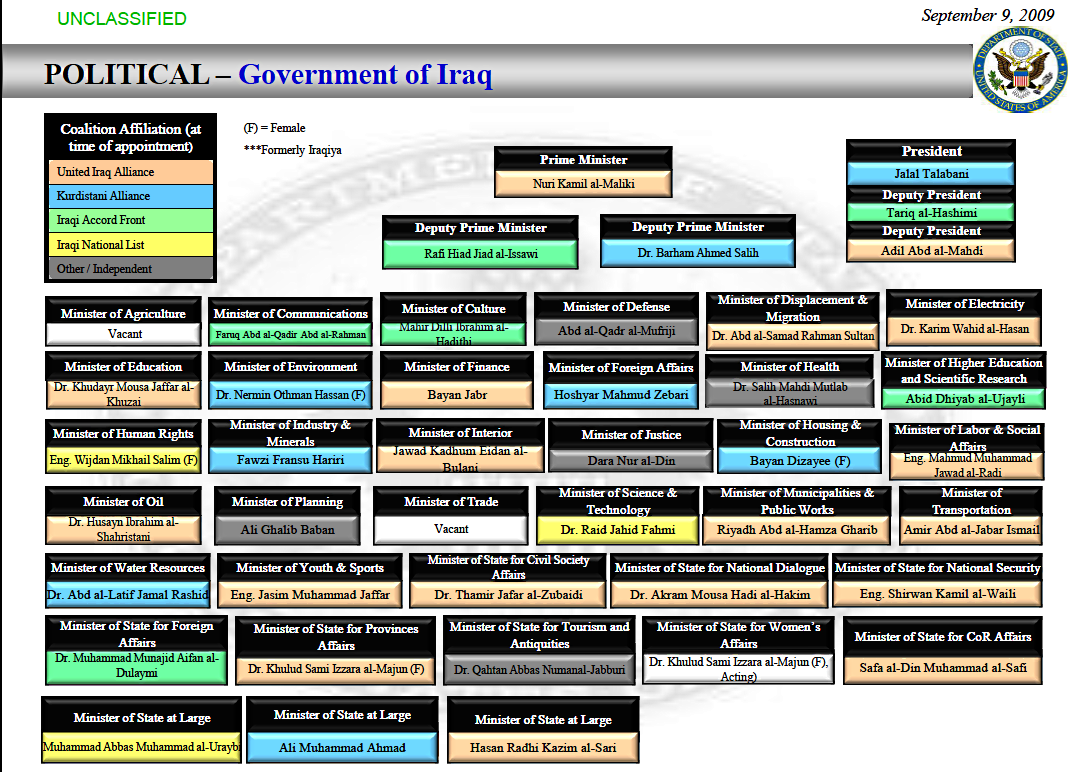
Organization of the Iraqi cabinet, as of September 2009

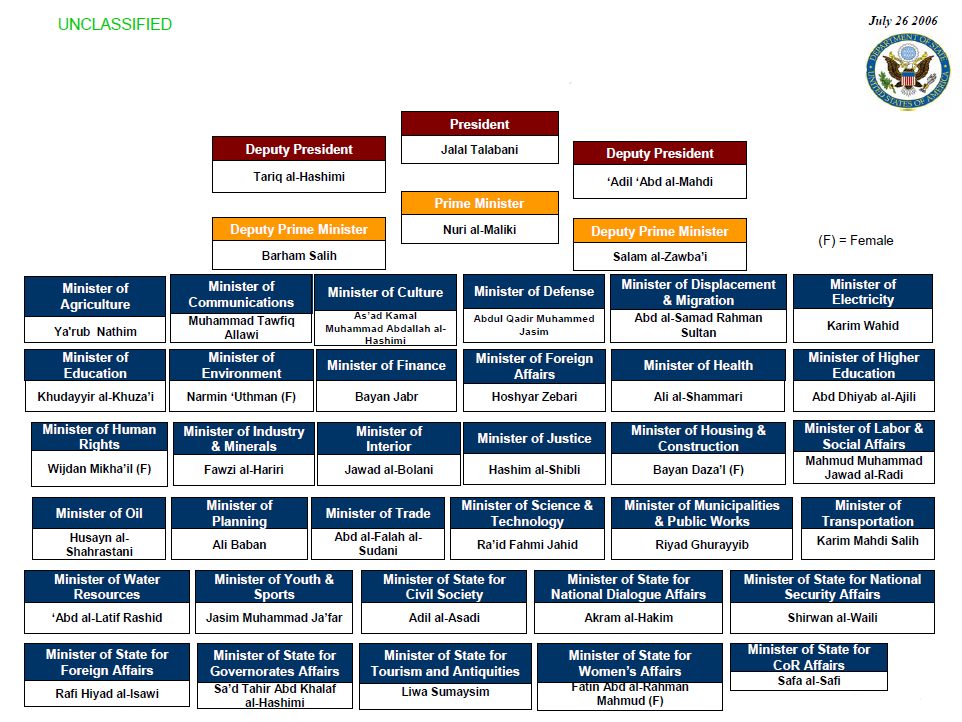
Organization of the Iraqi cabinet, as of July 2006

Portfolio	Minister	Coalition	Party	Dates
Prime Minister	Nouri al-Maliki	United Iraqi Alliance	Islamic Dawa Party	2006-05-20 -
Deputy Prime Minister	Barham Salih	Kurdistani Alliance	Patriotic Union of Kurdistan	2006-05-20 -
Deputy Prime Minister	Salam al-Zobaie	Iraqi Accord Front	Iraqi People's Conference	2006-05-20 – 2007-08-01
Deputy Prime Minister	Raffie al-Issawi	Iraqi Accord Front	Iraqi Islamic Party	2008-07-19 -
Interior Minister	Nouri al-Maliki (acting)	United Iraqi Alliance	Islamic Dawa Party	2006-05-20 – 2006-06-08
Interior Minister	Jawad Bulani	United Iraqi Alliance	Independent	2006-06-08 -
Foreign Minister	Hoshyar Zebari	Kurdistani Alliance	Kurdistan Democratic Party	2006-05-20 -
Defence Minister	Salam al-Zaubai (acting)	Iraqi Accord Front	Iraqi People's Conference	2006-05-20 – 2006-06-08
Defence Minister	Qadir Obeidi	Iraqi Accord Front	Independent	2006-06-08 -
Oil Minister	Hussain al-Shahristani	United Iraqi Alliance	Independent	2006-05-20 -
Electricity Minister	Karim Waheed	United Iraqi Alliance	Independent	2006-05-20 -
Minister of Planning	Ali Baban	Iraqi Accord Front (expelled 2007)	Iraqi Islamic Party (expelled 2007)	2006-05-20 -
Higher Education Minister	Abd Dhiyab al-Ajili	Iraqi Accord Front	Iraqi Islamic Party	2006-05-20 – 2007-08-01; 2008-07-19 -
Minister of Municipalities and Public Works	Riad Ghareeb	United Iraqi Alliance	Supreme Islamic Iraqi Council	2006-05-20 -
Finance Minister	Bayan Jabor	United Iraqi Alliance	Supreme Islamic Iraqi Council	2006-05-20 -
Minister of Water Resources	Abdul-Latif Rashid	Kurdistani Alliance	Patriotic Union of Kurdistan	2006-05-20 -
Environment Minister	Narmin Othman	Kurdistani Alliance	Patriotic Union of Kurdistan	2006-05-20 -
Minister of Trade	Abdul Falah al-Sudany	United Iraqi Alliance	Islamic Dawa Party – Iraq Organisation	2006-05-20 – 2009-05-15
Minister of Trade	Vacant			
Transport Minister	Karim Mahdi Salih	United Iraqi Alliance	Sadrist Movement	2006-05-20 – 2007-04-16
Transport Minister	Aamer Abdeljabbar Ismail	United Iraqi Alliance		2008-07-19 -
Minister of Labour and Social Affairs	Mahmoud al-Radi	United Iraqi Alliance	Supreme Islamic Iraqi Council	2006-05-20 -
Human Rights Minister	Wijdan Michael	Iraqi National List	Iraqi National Accord	2006-05-20 - 2007-08-24
Health Minister	Ali al-Shemari	United Iraqi Alliance	Sadrist Movement	2006-05-20 – 2007-04-16
Health Minister	Salih al-Hasnawi			2007-10-30 -
Minister of Construction and Housing	Bayan Dezei	Kurdistani Alliance	Kurdistan Democratic Party	2006-05-20 -
Education Minister	Khodair al-Khozaei	United Iraqi Alliance	Islamic Dawa Party – Iraq Organisation	2006-05-20 -
Agriculture Minister	Yaroub al-Abodi	United Iraqi Alliance	Sadrist Movement	2006-05-20 – 2007-04-16
Agriculture Minister	Ali al-Bahadili			2007-10-30 -
Justice Minister	Hashem al-Shebly	Iraqi National List	National Democratic Party	2006-05-20 – 2007-03-31
Justice Minister	Safa al-Safi (acting)	United Iraqi Alliance	independent	2007-03-31 -
Justice Minister	Judge Dara Nur al-Din	Kurdistani Alliance	independent	2009-02-01 -
Culture Minister	Asaad Kamal Hashemi	Iraqi Accord Front	Iraqi People's Conference	2006-05-20 – 2007-08-01
Culture Minister	Mahir Dali Ibrahim al-Hadithi	Iraqi Accord Front		2008-07-19 -
Minister of Science and Technology	Raed Fahmy Jahid	Iraqi National List	Iraqi Communist Party	2006-05-20 -
Minister of Displacement and Migration	Abdul Samad Sultan	United Iraqi Alliance	Fayli Kurd	2006-05-20 -
Minister of Youth and Sports	Jasem Mohammed Jaafar	Kurdistani Alliance	Shiite Turkmen	2006-05-20 -
Minister of Industry & Minerals	Fawzi Hariri	Kurdistani Alliance	Kurdistan Democratic Party	2006-05-20 -
Communications Minister	Mohammed Tawfiq Allawi	Iraqi National List		2006-05-20 – 2007-08-24
Communications Minister	Farouq Abdul Qadir Abdul Rahman	Iraqi Accord Front		2008-07-19 -
Ministers of State:
National Security Affairs	Barham Salih	Kurdistani Alliance	Patriotic Union of Kurdistan	2006-05-20 – 2006-06-08
National Security Affairs	Shirwan Waili	United Iraqi Alliance	Islamic Dawa Party – Iraq Organisation	2006-06-08 -
Governorate Affairs	Saad Taher Abd Khalaf al-Hashemi	Iraqi National List	Iraqi National Accord	2006-05-20 – 2007-08-24
Governorate Affairs	Kholoud Sami Azaza	United Iraqi Alliance		2008-07-19 -
Civil Society Affairs	Adel al-Assadi	United Iraqi Alliance	Islamic Action Organisation	2006-05-20 -
Civil Society Affairs	Thamir Jaafar al-Zubeidi	United Iraqi Alliance		2008-07-19
Foreign Affairs	Rafi al-Isawi	Iraqi Accord Front	Iraqi Islamic Party	2006-05-20 – 2007-08-01
Foreign Affairs	Mohammed Munajid Aifan al-Dulaimi	Iraqi Accord Front		2008-07-19 -
National Dialogue	Akram al-Hakim	United Iraqi Alliance	Supreme Islamic Iraqi Council	2006-05-20 -
Women	Faten Abdul Rahman Mahmoud	Iraqi Accord Front	Iraqi Islamic Party	2006-05-20 – 2007-08-01
Women	Nawal Majeed Hameed	Iraqi Accord Front		2008-07-19
Tourism & Antiquities	Liwaa Semeism	United Iraqi Alliance	Sadrist Movement	2006-05-20 – 2007-04-16
Tourism & Antiquities	Qahtan Abbas No'man	United Iraqi Alliance		2008-07-19
National Assembly Affairs	Safaaeddine al-Safi	United Iraqi Alliance	Independent	2006-05-20 -
without portfolio	Muhammad Abbas al-Uraybi	Iraqi National List		2006-05-20 – 2007-08-24
without portfolio	Ali Muhammad Ahmad	Kurdistan Islamic Union	Kurdistan Islamic Union	2006-05-20 -
without portfolio	Hasan Radi Kazim al-Sari	United Iraqi Alliance	Iraqi Hezbollah	2006-05-20 -

=== Appointment process ===
Because of the weakness of the Prime Minister, individual ministers are expected to have significant independence in the running of their own departments. Particular importance was given to the Interior, Defense and Oil Ministries, and negotiations over the allocation of Ministries were lengthy.

The United States intervened on February 1 in the negotiations, calling for the Interior and Defense Ministries to be allocated to candidates who are "not regarded as sectarian". The US Ambassador Zalmay Khalilzad threatened to withdraw military aid if this was not done. The United Kingdom Foreign Secretary, Jack Straw also echoed this in talks with Talabani on February 20, 2006, saying these departments should be in the hands of "technocrats". Prime Minister-designate Ibrahim al-Jaafari reacted angrily, saying "Iraqis would not accept interference in their affairs".

=== Security Ministers ===
Negotiations continued between the coalition parties over the posts of Defense, Interior and National Security Minister. It was agreed that the Defense post should go to a Sunni Arab and the Interior to a Shi'ite Arab. It was also agreed that the three would be appointed for a six-month trial period. On May 28 the former Iraqi generals Baraa Najib al-Ruba'i and Nasser al-Ameri were tipped by the Turkish Press for Defense and Interior. Maliki was reported to favour al-Ruba’i for Minister of Defense and General Tawfiq al-Yasiri for Interior Minister. Other candidates discussed in the local press were:

Defense:

- Hajim al-Hassani
- Brigadier (ret.) Thamir Sultan al-Tikriti
- Abd al-Amir Issa

Interior:

- Jawad al-Bulani
- Aqil al-Turayhi
- Muwaffaq al-Ruba'i

National Security:

- Qassim Dawud, Independent, UIA

The new ministers were finally agreed and sworn in at a meeting of the Assembly on June 8:

- Defense Minister: Qadir Obeidi
- Interior Minister: Jawad al-Bulani
- National Security: Shirwan al-Waili

Only 198 out of 275 Assembly members were present and many were unaware of the nominees until they were announced. The Ministers required an absolute majority – 138 – to be confirmed, and received 182, 142 and 160 respectively with the IAF opposing Obeidi and Waili. The IAF had originally proposed Obeidi.

=== Sadrist resignations ===
On June 12 Al-Sabah newspaper reported that Transport Minister Karim Mahdi Salih, Minister of State for Tourism and Antiquities Liwaa Semeism and Minister of State for Governorate Affairs Saad Taher al-Hashimi may be forced to resign due to allegations of incompetence. However, Al-Mashriq newspaper claimed they were former Baath Party members.

=== Iraqi Accord Front resignations ===
On 2006-07-01, Tayseer Najah al-Mashhadani, a female Assembly member from the Iraqi Accord Front was kidnapped in Baghdad. The Accord Front accused Shiite militias of being behind the kidnapping and started a boycott of the National Assembly in protest. On July 8, they said they were considering also withdrawing their four ministers if Mashhadani was not released. She was released unharmed in September.

On 2007-08-01, the Front withdrew from the government, and its six representatives resigned. They had demanded the disbanding of Shi'ite militias, pardoning detainees who had not been charged and stopping raids.

== National Security Council ==
On January 22 the Kurdish leaders agreed, as part of the Salahuddin Principles, to support the creation of a National Security Council, which would involve the minority parties in the running of the government, and particularly oversee the operation of the Interior and Defense Ministries.

On March 19 the parties agreed to form this council, and agreed it would consist of nineteen members, headed by President Talabani, and split as follows:

- United Iraqi Alliance: 9
- Kurdistani Alliance: 4
- Iraqi Accordance Front / Iraqi Dialogue Front: 4
- Iraqi National List: 2

However on April 4 Ayatollah Hadi al-Modarresi met with the most senior Shi'ite cleric, Ali al-Sistani, to complain that the creation of this council was an attempt to steal the election from the Alliance and constrain the Prime Minister. He called instead for a national referendum to resolve any disputes.
