= 2010 Iraqi government formation =

- Date: March–December 2010
- Location: Baghdad, Iraq
- Participants: Nouri al-Maliki; Hussain al-Shahristani; Saleh al-Mutlaq; Rowsch Nuri Shaways
- Outcome: Al Maliki II Government

In the aftermath of the 2010 election, great attention was given to the decision on who should be the next Iraqi PM. Both al-Iraqiyya's Allawi and the State of Law coalition's al-Maliki laid claim to the post, so it was seen as up to the Kurdish parties and the Iraqi National Alliance to decide this matter.

One of the two main components of the INA, the Supreme Iraqi Islamic Council, stated it would not join any government that did not include former PM Allawi; the other main component, the Sadrist Movement, held an unofficial referendum on 2 and 3 April 2010 on who should be PM. The possible choices were Allawi, al-Maliki, former PM Ibrahim al-Jaafari, Adel Abdel Mahdi from the SIIC, and Jaafar al-Sadr (a little-known MP from al-Maliki's Dawa Party, son of its ideological founder Mohammad Baqir al-Sadr). On 7 April 2010, results were announced, according to which al-Jaafari had won with 24% of the vote. Jaafari had originally been a member of al-Maliki's Dawa Party, but had left it in 2008 to found his own party, the National Reform Trend, as whose lone MP he was elected in this election.

The full results of the 1.43 million ballots cast in the unofficial Sadrist referendum were as follows:

Candidate	Party	Election List	Percentage
Ibrahim al-Jaafari	National Reform Trend	National Iraqi Alliance	24%
Jaafar al-Sadr	Islamic Da'awa Party	State of Law Coalition	23%
Qusay al-Suhail	Sadr Movement	National Iraqi Alliance	17%
Nouri al-Maliki	Islamic Da'awa Party	State of Law Coalition	10%
Ayad Allawi	Iraqi National Accord	al-Iraqiyya	9%
Baha Araji	Sadr Movement	National Iraqi Alliance	5%
Ahmad Chalabi	Iraqi National Congress	National Iraqi Alliance	3%
Adil Abd al-Mahdi	Islamic Supreme Council of Iraq	National Iraqi Alliance	2%
Rafi al-Issawi	National Future Gathering	al-Iraqiyya	2%
Other	—	—	5%

== Background ==
After months of negotiations the National Iraqi Alliance and the State of Law Coalition agreed to merging into one parliamentary bloc of 159 seats, the bloc would be 4 seats short of a majority but would have the right for government formation. However the bloc has to date still not appointed a prime ministerial candidate. The bloc, called the National Alliance, was formally formed on 11 June 2010. The new parliament opened on 14 June 2010. However, talks between the National Iraqi Alliance and al-Iraqiyya continued. On 3 September 2010 the National Iraqi Alliance nominated Adil Abdul-Mahdi as the coalition's nominee for Prime Minister, making it unclear which candidate the National Alliance bloc would ultimately choose.

The President of Iraqi Kurdistan Massoud Barzani announced the four major Kurdish lists: the Kurdistani List, the Gorran List, the Kurdistan Islamic Union and the Islamic Group of Kurdistan agreed to merging into one parliamentary bloc of 57 seats, called the Coalition of Kurdistan Lists or Kurdistan Blocs Coalition (KBC). On 30 October, however the Nawshirwan Mustafa's Gorran Movement (announced their withdrawal from the KBC due to a dispute between Gorran and the ruling KDP-PUK coalition in the Kurdistan Region. This reduced the bloc to 49 seats In August the KBC announced 19 demands which would have to be agreed upon by al-Maliki or Allawi for them to join their government. The Islamic Supreme Council of Iraq then agreed to all 19 demands. Incumbent Prime Minister Nouri al-Maliki agreed to 18 out of 19 demands (including implementation of article 140), only disagreeing with the demand that the government were to resign if the Kurdistan Alliance withdraws. Al-Iraqiya, however, rejected 9 of the Kurdish demands, including the demands for a Kurdish presidency, Iraqi government funding of the Peshmerga and for the implementation of article 140 of the Iraqi constitution.

Incumbent Prime Minister Nuri al-Maliki also visited Iran amid drawn out coalition talks. The trip came amid reports from the Los Angeles Times and the Guardian that Iran had been directly involved trying to bring about a Shia coalition by convincing Muqtada al-Sadr to back an al-Maliki-led government, and thus increase Iran's influence in Iraq against those supported by the West. Iyad Allawi's bloc, which won a plurality, would then be sidelined. As such Allawi claimed to CNN that Iran was "trying to wreak havoc on the region, [by] trying to destabilise the region by destabilising Iraq, and destabilising Lebanon and destabilising the Palestinian issue. This is where unfortunately Iraq and the rest of the greater Mideast is falling victim to these terrorists who are definitely Iran-financed and supported by various governments in the region." His deputy was also alleged to have said "Iranian involvement amounts to a takeover of Iraq." While the West expressed worry about Iran's growing influence and potential influence in Iraq, Iran's Supreme Leader Ayatollah Ali Khamenei said, in responding to al-Maliki description that mutual relations were strategic and amicable, "Despite relative stability in Iraq, the country is still suffering from insecurity and part of this insecurity is resulted from the pressures that are exerted by some powers whose political interests lie in creating insecurity in Iraq." Following his visit to Iran, al-Maliki also visited Syria, Jordan and Egypt, where he said a new government could be imminent as "discussions are taking place, we are now at the end of the tunnel, at the end of the road. If God allows, this government will emerge soon." A few days later, Iranian President Mahmoud Ahmadinejad talked to his Iraqi counterpart Jalal Talabani and said he "hope[s] that with the formation of a new Iraqi government, bilateral ties will expand in different areas, especially in the economic and political fields."

Saudi Arabia also offered to host an all-party conference in November to break the deadlock in government formation. However, al-Maliki's bloc turned down the proposal amid concerns over foreign interference. The National Alliance issued a statement saying: "Though we express our appreciation to Saudi Arabia for its concern about the situation in Iraq and its willingness to provide support, we would like to confirm Iraqi leaders are continuing their meetings to reach a national consensus." a statement issued by the alliance, said. The Kurdish Alliance also reportedly supported the statement. While Iraqiya welcomed the Saudi initiative. "We ask all political blocs to welcome the initiative, preventing Iraq's security situation from deteriorating." The United States also called for an "inclusive government." It said that Allawi and others from Iraqiya, as well as all the "winning blocs" should hold "leadership posts" in a new government. In early October, the National Alliance (consisting of State of Law and the NIA) nominated Nouri al-Maliki as their Prime Minister candidate after Muqtada al-Sadr and al-Maliki struck a deal together. This however led to a split within the National Alliance (159 seats) as the ISCI-bloc (which including Badr and Hezbollah holds 19 seats), the Islamic Fadhila Party (6 seats) and the Gathering of Justice and Unity (1 seat) left the alliance to create an alliance with Ayad Allawi's al-Iraqiyya (91 seats). The Iraqiyya led bloc nominated prominent ISCI politician and at the time Vice-President Adil Abd al-Mahdi as Prime Minister. Meanwhile, the two minor Sunni blocs, Unity Alliance of Iraq and the Iraqi Accord Front merged into one 10-seat bloc, called the Center Current, which entered into negotiations with both major blocs for coalition partnerships. However, both blocs needed the support of Kurdish parties to gain a parliamentary majority, this support was eventually given to al-Maliki's bloc after he agreed to all 19 Kurdish demands, which led to the re-uniting of the National Alliance.

On 24 October, the Supreme Court of Iraq ordered the parliament to reconvene and elect a new speaker. The court ordered a parliamentary speaker to be chosen on 8 November The day before the vote for parliamentary speaker, a power-sharing accord was agreed to that would allow al-Maliki to continues as PM. As talks to form a new government reached a climax al-Maliki and Allawi were scheduled to attend a ceremony in Arbil, the capital of the autonomous region of Kurdistan, to make a formal announcement in regards to the agreement. Iraqiya MP Jamal al-Butikh then said an agreement was reached after assurances that "no political decision would be made without its agreement." At one point, Iraqiya staged a walkout after al-Nujaifi declined a request to vote on the removal of three parliament members' names because of affiliation to the deposed Saddam Hussein's Ba'ath Party. They later said the walkout was a misunderstanding.

During the parliamentary session on 11 November, Osama al-Nujaifi, a Sunni Arab from Iraqiya's al-Hadba Party was elected to be parliamentary speaker, with prominent Sadrist leader Qusay al-Suhail chosen as his first deputy and Arif Tayfur (a leading member of Massoud Barzani's Kurdistan Democratic Party) was re-elected to the post of second deputy speaker. Patriotic Union of Kurdistan leader Jalal Talabani was re-elected as President, al-Maliki was re-elected as prime minister and Allawi had reportedly agreed to head a new security council. Massoud Barzani, the president of Kurdistan region said that it was a great victory for the Iraqi people, which came at a late stage. A third session of the new parliament on 21 November still did not come to an agreement on who would run the new government.

== New parliamentary blocs ==
During the government formation process numerous lists fused together to form larger parliamentary blocs.

Parliamentary Bloc	Alliances	Leader	Seats	Percentage	Source
National Alliance	State of Law Coalition, National Iraqi Alliance	Ibrahim al-Jaafari	159	48.92%	
al-Iraqiya	al-Iraqiyya	Hasan Khalaf al-Jibburi	91	28%	
Kurdistan Blocs Coalition	Kurdistani List, Kurdistan Islamic Union, Islamic Group of Kurdistan	Fuad Masum	49	15.08%	
Center Current	al-Tawafuq, Unity Alliance of Iraq	Iyad al-Samara'i	10	3.08%	
Gorran Bloc	Gorran Movement	Shorsh Haji	8	2.46%	
National Rafidain List	Assyrian Democratic Movement	Yonadam Kanna	3	0.92%	
CSAPC	Chaldean Syriac Assyrian; Popular Council	Sarkis Aghajan	2	0.65%	
Independents	—	—	3	—	

== New government ==
On December 22, parliament unanimously approved al-Maliki's new government. Twenty-nine ministers were approved, including Shias, Sunnis and Kurds. In reaction, al-Maliki issued his new government's programme and also vowed to make Iraq a "truly democratic state that respects human rights." However, he criticised the lack of any female nominees and warned that "given the circumstances it has been created under, this government does not satisfy the people nor the needs of our country. The effort and the will to make it work in the best possible way it can is there."

In the new government al-Maliki became acting Minister of Defence, Interior, and National Security. Thus, essentially giving al-Maliki full control of the military. These positions were meant to be temporary until appropriate candidates could be found, however al-Maliki remained in them until the end of his term. Former Oil Minister Hussein Shahristani would become Deputy Prime Minister for Energy. The former Deputy Prime Minister Rafi al-Issawi would become Finance Minister. Foreign Minister Hoshyar Zebari will continue in his post. Saleh al-Mutlaq was also controversially appointed a Deputy Prime Minister after a ban on him taking part in politics as a former Ba'athist. Thirteen more ministerial posts had acting ministers as al-Maliki said "The formation of national unity government in Iraq is a difficult and hard task because we need to find place in the government for all those who participated and won in the elections."

Portfolio	Website	Minister	Coalition	Party	Dates
Prime Minister		Nouri al-Maliki	State of Law Coalition	Islamic Dawa Party	2010-12-21 -
Deputy Prime Minister for Energy		Hussain al-Shahristani	State of Law Coalition	independent	2010-12-21 -
Deputy Prime Minister		Saleh al-Mutlaq	Iraqiyya	Iraqi National Dialogue Front	2010-12-21 -
Deputy Prime Minister		Rowsch Nuri Shaways	Kurdistan List	Kurdistan Democratic Party	2010-12-21 -
Sovereign Ministries
Defense Minister	www.mod.mil.iq	(acting) Nouri al-Maliki	State of Law Coalition	Islamic Dawa Party	2010-12-21 - 2011-08-17
Defense Minister	www.mod.mil.iq	Saadoun al-Dulaimi	State of Law Coalition	Unity Alliance of Iraq	2011-08-17 -
Finance Minister	www.mof.gov.iq	Rafi al-Issawi	Iraqiyya	National Future Gathering	2010-12-21 -
Foreign Minister	www.mofa.gov.iq	Hoshyar Zebari	Kurdistan List	Kurdistan Democratic Party	2010-12-21 -
Interior Minister	www.moi.gov.iq	(acting) Nouri al-Maliki	State of Law Coalition	Islamic Dawa Party	2010-12-21 -
Oil Minister	www.oil.gov.iq	Abdul Karim Luaibi	State of Law Coalition	independent	
Other Ministries
Agriculture Minister		Izz al-Din al-Dawla	Iraqiyya	al-Hadba	2010-12-21 -
Communications Minister	www.iraqimoc.net www.nmc.gov.iq	Mohammed Tawfiq Allawi	Iraqiyya	Iraqi National Accord	2010-12-21 -
Construction & Housing Minister	www.moch.gov.iq	Muhammad al-Darraji	National Iraqi Alliance	Sadrist Movement	2010-12-21 -
Culture Minister	www.mocul.gov.iq	Saadoun al-Dulaimi	Unity Alliance of Iraq	independent	2010-12-21 -
Displacement and Migration Minister	ww.momd.gov.iq	Dindar Najman	Kurdistan Islamic Union		2010-12-21 -
Education Minister		Mohammed Tamim	Iraqiyya	Iraqi National Dialogue Front	2010-12-21 -
Electricity Minister	www.moelc.gov.iq	Hussain al-Shahristani (acting)	State of Law Coalition	Independent	2010-12-21 - 2011-02-13
Electricity Minister	www.moelc.gov.iq	Raad Shallal al-Ani	Iraqiyya	al-Hal	2011-02-13 - 2011-08-08
Electricity Minister	www.moelc.gov.iq	Abdulkarim Aftan	Iraqiyya		2011-12-12 -
Environment Minister	www.moen.gov.iq	Sargon Lazar Slewa	National Rafidain List	Assyrian Democratic Movement	2010-12-21 -
Health Minister	www.moh.gov.iq	Majid Mohammed Amin	Kurdistan Alliance	Patriotic Union of Kurdistan	?
Higher Education & Scientific Research Minister	www.mohesr.gov.iq	Ali al-Adeeb	State of Law Coalition	Islamic Dawa Party	2010-12-21 -
Human Rights Minister	www.humanrights.gov.iq	Muhammad Shiya al-Sudani	State of Law Coalition	Islamic Dawa Party	2010-12-21 -
Industry & Minerals Minister	www.industry.gov.iq	Ahmad Nassar Dali al-Karbouli	Iraqiyya	Renewal List	2010-12-21 -
Justice Minister	www.moj.gov.iq	Hasan al-Shammari	National Iraqi Alliance	Islamic Virtue Party	2010-12-21 -
Labour & Social Affairs Minister	www.molsa.gov.iq	Nassar al-Rubayie	National Iraqi Alliance	Sadrist Movement	2010-12-21 -
Municipalities and Public Works Minister	www.mmpw.gov.iq	(acting) Dindar Najman	Kurdistan Islamic Union		2010-12-21 -
Municipalities and Public Works Minister	www.mmpw.gov.iq	Adil Mahwadar Radi	Sadrist Movement		2011-02-13 -
Science & Technology Minister	www.most.gov.iq	Abd al-Karim al-Samarrai	Iraqiyya	Renewal List	2010-12-21 -
Trade Minister	www.mot.gov.iq	(acting) Rowsch Nuri Shaways	Kurdistan List	Kurdistan Democratic Party	2010-12-32 -
Trade Minister	www.mot.gov.iq	Khairalla Hasan Babiker	Kurdistan List		2011-02-13 -
Transport Minister	www.motrans.gov.iq	Hadi Al-Amiri	National Iraqi Alliance	Badr Organization	2010-12-21 -
Tourism & Antiquities Minister		Liwaa Semeism	National Iraqi Alliance	Sadrist Movement	2010-12-21 -
Water Resources Minister	www.mowr.gov.iq	Mohaned al-Saadi	National Iraqi Alliance	Sadrist Movement	2010-12-21 -
Women's Affairs Minister		(acting) Hoshyar Zebari, then, Ibtihal al-Zaidi	Kurdistan List	Kurdistan Democratic Party	2010-12-21 -
Works & Planning Minister		(acting) Nassar al-Rubayie	National Iraqi Alliance	Sadrist Movement	2010-12-21 -
Youth & Sport Minister	www.moys.gov.iq	Jasim Mohammed Jaafar	State of Law Coalition	Islamic Union of Iraqi Turkoman	2010-12-21 -
Ministers of State
Minister of State and Government spokesman	www.goi-s.com	Ali al-Dabbagh	State of Law Coalition	Independent Iraqi Kafaat Gathering	2010-12-21 -
Minister of State for Parliament Affairs		Safa al-Safi	State of Law Coalition	independent	2010-12-21 -
Minister of State		Abd al-Mahdi al-Mutayri	National Iraqi Alliance	Sadrist Movement	2010-12-21 -
Minister of State		Bushra Hussein Saleh	National Iraqi Alliance	Islamic Virtue Party	2010-12-21 -
Minister of State		Hassan Radia al-Sari	National Iraqi Alliance	Hezbollah Movement in Iraq	2010-12-21 -
Minister of State		Yassin Mohammed Ahmed	Iraqi National Alliance	ISCI	2010-12-21 -
Minister of State for National Reconciliation		Amer al-Khizaii	???	???	2010-12-21 -
Minister of State for National Dialogue		(acting) Ali al-Adeeb	State of Law Coalition	Islamic Dawa Party	2010-12-21 -
Minister of State for Foreign Affairs		Ali Abdullah al-Sajeri	Unity Alliance of Iraq	Iraqi Constitutional Party	2010-12-21 -
Minister of State for Tribal Affairs		Hussein Ali al-Shaalan	Iraqiyya	Iraqi National List	2010-12-21 -
Minister of State		Salah Mazahem al-Jibouri	Iraqiyya	Iraqi National Dialogue Front	2010-12-21 -
Minister of State		Nurhan	???	???	2010-12-21 -
Minister of State for National Security		(acting) Nouri al-Maliki	State of Law Coalition	Islamic Dawa Party	2010-12-21 -
Minister of State for Provincial Affairs		Turhan Abdullah	Iraqiyya	Iraqi Turkmen Front	2010-12-21 -
Minister of State for Non-Governmental Organizations		???	Kurdistan List	???	2010-12-21 -

Repercussions

Following the formation of a government and his blocs strong showing Muqtada al-Sadr returned to Najaf from exile in Iran in early January 2011.

=== Aftermath ===
In July 2011 al-Maliki agreed to cut 12 ministries from his cabinet, which was a compromise from his original proposal to cut 16 ministerial portfolios. The agreement comes amid debate over whether or not a US military contingent would remain beyond a 31 December 2011 deadline for their withdrawal.
