= Al Maliki II government =

Second Iraqi government after the 2003 invasion (2010–2014)

- 2nd government of the Republic of Iraq
- 2010–2014
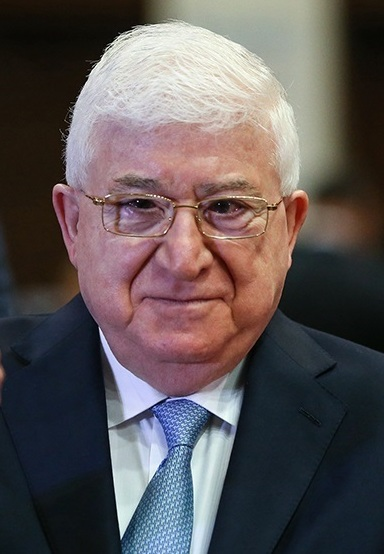
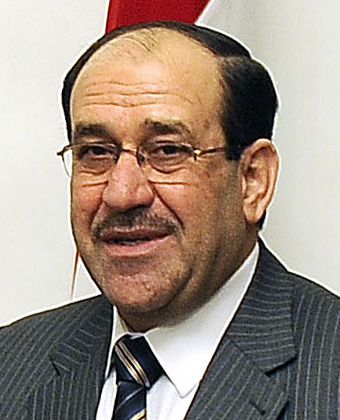
- Iraqi president Fuad Masum and prime minister Nouri al-Maliki
- Date formed: 22 December 2010
- Date dissolved: 8 September 2014

People and organisations
- President: Jalal Talabani; Fuad Masum
- Prime Minister: Nouri al-Maliki
- No. of ministers: 47
- Member parties: National unity government

History
- Legislature term: Iraqi National Assembly
- Predecessor: Al Maliki I government
- Successor: al-Abadi government

The second Al-Maliki government was the government of Iraq from 22 December 2010 to 8 September 2014. This followed a record length of time since the Iraqi parliamentary election, 2010 which resulted in Prime Minister Nouri al-Maliki retaining his position and forming a national unity government including all main blocs that had been elected to parliament.

The Al-Maliki II government was succeeded by the government of Haider al-Abadi.

== Formation ==
The Council of Representatives of Iraq unanimously approved al-Maliki's new government. Twenty-nine ministers were approved, including Shias, Sunnis and Kurds. In reaction, al-Maliki issued his new government's programme and also vowed to make Iraq a "truly democratic state that respects human rights." However, he criticised the lack of any female nominees and warned that "given the circumstances it has been created under, this government does not satisfy the people nor the needs of our country. The effort and the will to make it work in the best possible way it can is there."

Al-Maliki took the role as acting Minister of Defence, Interior and National Security "until appropriate candidates were found." Former Oil Minister Hussein al-Shahristani became Deputy Prime Minister for Energy. The former Deputy Prime Minister Rafi al-Issawi became Finance Minister. Foreign Minister Hoshyar Zebari will continue in his post. Saleh al-Mutlaq was also controversially appointed a Deputy Prime Minister after a ban on him taking part in politics as a former Baathist. Thirteen more ministerial posts had acting ministers as al-Maliki said "The formation of national unity government in Iraq is a difficult and hard task because we need to find place in the government for all those who participated and won in the elections."

== List of ministers ==
Portfolio	Website	Minister	Coalition	Party	Dates
Prime Minister		Nouri al-Maliki	State of Law Coalition	Islamic Dawa Party	2010-12-21 -
Deputy Prime Minister for Energy		Hussain al-Shahristani	State of Law Coalition	independent	2010-12-21 -
Deputy Prime Minister		Saleh al-Mutlaq	Iraqiyya	Iraqi National Dialogue Front	2010-12-21 -
Deputy Prime Minister		Rowsch Nuri Shaways	Kurdistan List	Kurdistan Democratic Party	2010-12-21 -
Sovereign Ministries
Defense Minister	www.mod.mil.iq	(acting) Nouri al-Maliki	State of Law Coalition	Islamic Dawa Party	2010-12-21 - 2011-08-17
Defense Minister	www.mod.mil.iq	Saadoun al-Dulaimi	State of Law Coalition	Unity Alliance of Iraq	2011-08-17 -
Finance Minister	www.mof.gov.iq	Rafi al-Issawi	Iraqiyya	National Future Gathering	2010-12-21 -
Foreign Minister	www.mofa.gov.iq	Hoshyar Zebari	Kurdistan List	Kurdistan Democratic Party	2010-12-21 -
Interior Minister	www.moi.gov.iq	(acting) Nouri al-Maliki	State of Law Coalition	Islamic Dawa Party	2010-12-21 -
Oil Minister	www.oil.gov.iq	Abdul Karim Luaibi	State of Law Coalition	independent	
Other Ministries
Agriculture Minister		Izz al-Din al-Dawla	Iraqiyya	al-Hadba	2010-12-21 -
Communications Minister	www.iraqimoc.net www.nmc.gov.iq	Mohammed Tawfiq Allawi	Iraqiyya	Iraqi National Accord	2010-12-21 -
Construction & Housing Minister	www.moch.gov.iq	Muhammad al-Darraji	National Iraqi Alliance	Sadrist Movement	2010-12-21 -
Culture Minister	www.mocul.gov.iq	Saadoun al-Dulaimi	Unity Alliance of Iraq	independent	2010-12-21 -
Displacement and Migration Minister	ww.momd.gov.iq	Dindar Najman	Kurdistan Islamic Union		2010-12-21 -
Education Minister		Mohammed Tamim	Iraqiyya	Iraqi National Dialogue Front	2010-12-21 -
Electricity Minister	www.moelc.gov.iq	Hussain al-Shahristani (acting)	State of Law Coalition	Independent	2010-12-21 - 2011-02-13
Electricity Minister	www.moelc.gov.iq	Raad Shallal al-Ani	Iraqiyya	al-Hal	2011-02-13 - 2011-08-08
Electricity Minister	www.moelc.gov.iq	Abdulkarim Aftan	Iraqiyya		2011-12-12 -
Environment Minister	www.moen.gov.iq	Sargon Lazar Slewa	National Rafidain List	Assyrian Democratic Movement	2010-12-21 -
Health Minister	www.moh.gov.iq	Majid Mohammed Amin	Kurdistan Alliance	Patriotic Union of Kurdistan	?
Higher Education & Scientific Research Minister	www.mohesr.gov.iq	Ali al-Adeeb	State of Law Coalition	Islamic Dawa Party	2010-12-21 -
Human Rights Minister	www.humanrights.gov.iq	Muhammad Shiya al-Sudani	State of Law Coalition	Islamic Dawa Party	2010-12-21 -
Industry & Minerals Minister	www.industry.gov.iq	Ahmad Nassar Dali al-Karbouli	Iraqiyya	Renewal List	2010-12-21 -
Justice Minister	www.moj.gov.iq	Hasan al-Shammari	National Iraqi Alliance	Islamic Virtue Party	2010-12-21 -
Labour & Social Affairs Minister	www.molsa.gov.iq	Nassar al-Rubayie	National Iraqi Alliance	Sadrist Movement	2010-12-21 -
Municipalities and Public Works Minister	www.mmpw.gov.iq	(acting) Dindar Najman	Kurdistan Islamic Union		2010-12-21 -
Municipalities and Public Works Minister	www.mmpw.gov.iq	Adil Mahwadar Radi	Sadrist Movement		2011-02-13 -
Science & Technology Minister	www.most.gov.iq	Abd al-Karim al-Samarrai	Iraqiyya	Renewal List	2010-12-21 -
Trade Minister	www.mot.gov.iq	(acting) Rowsch Nuri Shaways	Kurdistan List	Kurdistan Democratic Party	2010-12-32 -
Trade Minister	www.mot.gov.iq	Khairalla Hasan Babiker	Kurdistan List		2011-02-13 -
Transport Minister	www.motrans.gov.iq	Hadi Al-Amiri	National Iraqi Alliance	Badr Organization	2010-12-21 -
Tourism & Antiquities Minister		Liwaa Semeism	National Iraqi Alliance	Sadrist Movement	2010-12-21 -
Water Resources Minister	www.mowr.gov.iq	Mohaned al-Saadi	National Iraqi Alliance	Sadrist Movement	2010-12-21 -
Women's Affairs Minister		(acting) Hoshyar Zebari, then, Ibtihal al-Zaidi	Kurdistan List	Kurdistan Democratic Party	2010-12-21 -
Works & Planning Minister		(acting) Nassar al-Rubayie	National Iraqi Alliance	Sadrist Movement	2010-12-21 -
Youth & Sport Minister	www.moys.gov.iq	Jasim Mohammed Jaafar	State of Law Coalition	Islamic Union of Iraqi Turkoman	2010-12-21 -
Ministers of State
Minister of State and Government spokesman	www.goi-s.com	Ali al-Dabbagh	State of Law Coalition	Independent Iraqi Kafaat Gathering	2010-12-21 -
Minister of State for Parliament Affairs		Safa al-Safi	State of Law Coalition	independent	2010-12-21 -
Minister of State		Abd al-Mahdi al-Mutayri	National Iraqi Alliance	Sadrist Movement	2010-12-21 -
Minister of State		Bushra Hussein Saleh	National Iraqi Alliance	Islamic Virtue Party	2010-12-21 -
Minister of State		Hassan Radia al-Sari	National Iraqi Alliance	Hezbollah Movement in Iraq	2010-12-21 -
Minister of State		Yassin Mohammed Ahmed	Iraqi National Alliance	ISCI	2010-12-21 -
Minister of State for National Reconciliation		Amer al-Khizaii	???	???	2010-12-21 -
Minister of State for National Dialogue		(acting) Ali al-Adeeb	State of Law Coalition	Islamic Dawa Party	2010-12-21 -
Minister of State for Foreign Affairs		Ali Abdullah al-Sajeri	Unity Alliance of Iraq	Iraqi Constitutional Party	2010-12-21 -
Minister of State for Tribal Affairs		Hussein Ali al-Shaalan	Iraqiyya	Iraqi National List	2010-12-21 -
Minister of State		Salah Mazahem al-Jibouri	Iraqiyya	Iraqi National Dialogue Front	2010-12-21 -
Minister of State		Nurhan	???	???	2010-12-21 -
Minister of State for National Security		(acting) Nouri al-Maliki	State of Law Coalition	Islamic Dawa Party	2010-12-21 -
Minister of State for Provincial Affairs		Turhan Abdullah	Iraqiyya	Iraqi Turkmen Front	2010-12-21 -
Minister of State for Non-Governmental Organizations		???	Kurdistan List	???	2010-12-21 -

Preceded by Al Maliki I Government	Al Maliki II Government; 22 December 2010 – 8 September 2014	Succeeded by Al Abadi Government
