= Karim Mahdi Salih =

Iraqi politician

- كريم مهدي صالح

Minister of Transport
- In office 20 May 2006 – 20 April 2007
- President: Jalal Talabani
- Prime Minister: Nouri al-Maliki
- Preceded by: Salam al-Maliki
- Succeeded by: Amer Abd al-Jabbar Ismail

Personal details
- Party: National Shiite Movement

Karim Mahdi Salih (Note: Arabic: كريم مهدي صالح) is an Iraqi politician who served as Minister of Transport of Iraq in the government of Nouri al-Maliki from 20 May 2006 until 16 April 2007. He is a member of the Sadrist Movement within the United Iraqi Alliance.

In July, Salih offered his resignation as Transport Minister, along with fellow Sadrist ministers Liwaa Semeism and Sa'd Tahir Al-Hashimi. The Agriculture Minister, Ya'rub Nazim al-Abbudi was reported to have been appointed as temporary Transport Minister in his place. Moqtadr al-Sadr was reported to have said the three ministers "lacked the necessary qualifications and experience to run their ministries". However he was still in his position four months later
