= Iraqi government formation =

Iraqi government formation may refer to:

- 2006 Iraqi government formation
- 2010 Iraqi government formation
- 2021–2022 Iraqi political crisis
