= Ali al-Bahadili =

Iraqi politician (1943–2023)

Ali Husayn al-Bahadili (Arabic: علي حسين البهادلي; 1943 – 9 February 2023) was an Iraqi politician who served as the Agriculture Minister in the government of Nouri al-Maliki.

Al-Bahadili was born in 1943. He served as the Agriculture Minister under the Iraqi Transitional Government from 2005 to 2006 under Ibrahim al-Jafari. He was reappointed in October 2007 following the withdrawal from government of the Sadrist Movement.

Al-Bahadili qualified as a doctor at the University of California, Davis and is independent of any political party. Al-Bahadili died on 9 February 2023, at the age of 80.
