= Sargon Lazar Slewa =

Iraqi politician

Minister of Environment
- In office 21 December 2010 – 8 September 2014
- President: Jalal Talabani; Fuad Masum
- Prime Minister: Nouri al-Maliki
- Preceded by: Narmin Othman
- Succeeded by: Qutaiba al-Jubouri

Personal details
- Party: Assyrian Democratic Movement

Sargon Lazar Slewa is an Iraqi politician. An ethnic Assyrian, he belonged to the Assyrian Democratic Movement. He served as Minister of Environment of the Republic of Iraq from 2010 to 2014, during the second Al-Maliki government, and as a Vice President of the United Nations Environment Assembly.

== Corruption ==
In November 2015, Slewa was sentenced to two years in prison and ordered to pay a fine of around $280,000 on graft-related charges.
