= Faten Mahmoud =

Iraqi politician

Faten Mahmoud is a Minister of State for Women's Affairs in the cabinet of Iraqi Prime Minister Nouri al-Maliki. She is one of five female members of the Cabinet.
