= Abd Dhiyab al-Ajili =

Iraqi politician

Abid Thiyab Al-Ajeeli (/ˈæbɪd ˈdiːjɑːb ɑːl əˈdʒeɪli/ Arabic: د. عبد ذياب العجيلي) (born 1950) was the Iraqi Minister of Higher Education and Scientific Research in the government of Nouri al-Maliki, between May 2006 and December 2010. He was elected as part of the Sunni Arab-majority Iraqi Accord Front and is a member of the Iraqi Islamic Party.

Al-Ajeeli finished his BSc in Operations research from Southampton University, England in 1976. In 1977, he earned his MSc from the same university, and earned his PhD from Keele University, England in 1990.

In November 2006, while serving as minister of higher education, Al-Ajeeli announced temporary closure of Iraqi universities in protest at a mass abduction by people in police uniforms of people from the ministry building in Baghdad.
