= Raad Shallal al-Ani =

Iraqi politician

- Born: January 1960 (age 66)
- Occupation: Electrical engineering

Raad Shallal al-Ani (born January 1960) is an Iraqi politician who was Electricity Minister from February to August 2011.

== Early life and education ==
Shallal graduated from University of Sulaymaniyah on 1981 and holds a Master of Engineering degree.

== The Iraqi Electricity Ministry ==
When Prime Minister Nouri al-Maliki formed his second government in December 2010, ten of the ministries, including the Electricity Ministry, were left unfilled with acting ministers. The appointment to this position of Raad Shallal, described as a "technocrat", was approved by parliament on 13 February 2011.

When he was appointed, Iraq was producing only 7 gigawatts of electricity, despite being the 12th largest producer of oil. The country also imported around 5 gigawatts, giving the national grid only six hours per day of electricity. The start of his term coincided with protests by thousands of Iraqis nationwide against corruption and poor services, including lack of electricity, inspired by the Arab Spring. The protests subsided by the end of February after al-Maliki gave his ministers 100 days to improve their performance and reduce corruption.

In March Shallal announced a $6.25 billion deal with Caterpillar Inc., MAN Diesel and STX Corporation to install 50 mini power stations across the country. Each power station would contain 25 diesel generators, increasing total electricity production by 5 gigawatts and allowing 16 hours per day of supply. This would be a temporary solution until medium-term power projects come online in 2013.

In July Shallal signed two contracts to expand electricity provision, the first, worth $1.2 billion, with Capgent, a Canadian firm, and the second, for $500 million, with Maschinenbau Halberstadt, a German firm. However, an investigation by the former Planning Minister, Jawad Hashem, found that the first company did not exist and the second had entered bankruptcy six months before signing the contract, these informations appeared to be lies from the corrupted Jawad Hashem with the help from some dirty politicians who were trying to get to the ministry of electricity as the government signed the same contracts with the same companies again shortly after Mr.Shallal resignation. Shallal resigned on 15 August because of the government's corruption. However, the US Congressional Research Service said he had been used as a "scapegoat for continued electricity shortages", and Shallal's party claimed that the contracts had also been signed by Prime Minister al-Maliki and the Deputy Prime Minister for Energy, Hussain al-Shahristani.

On 28 September Shallal was called for investigations on an order from the Commission on Integrity. He agreed to testify in front of the commission.
