= Wijdan Michael =

Iraqi politician

Wijdan Michael Salem (Arabic: وجدان ميخائيل سليم; born 1963) is a former Minister of Human Rights in Iraq and currently advisor for development and service for the Prime Minister's Office. She made history by being a woman involved in the crafting of the 2005 Constitution of Iraq.

== Career ==
Salim was an urban planner in the Master Planning Department from the City of Baghdad from 1984 to 1996. She became the Deputy General Director of Design for Baghdad in 1996, staying in the position until 2004. From 2006 to 2010, she acted as the Minister of Human Rights in Iraq. In 2013, she became a member of the Advisory Commission for the Prime Minister's Office in Iraq.

Between 2003 and 2006, she has been a member of the Karadh District Council, the Baghdad Provincial Council, the Iraqi National Council, and the National Assembly of Iraq.
