= The Upholders of the Message =

- Religion: Shia Islam

The Upholders of the Message (AI-Risaliyun) is an Iraqi political list that ran in the December 2005 elections. This list won 1.2% of the popular vote, thus receiving two seats. The members are supporters of Muqtada al-Sadr and they were allowed to join the United Iraqi Alliance primary election for the Iraqi Prime Minister.
