= Shirwan al-Waili =

Iraqi politician

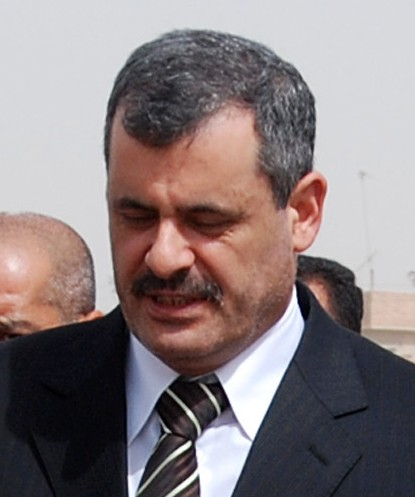
Shirwan al-Waili at Ramadi in 2007

Shirwan Kamil al-Waili (born 1957) is an Iraqi politician and Minister of State for National Security in the government of Prime Minister Nouri al-Maliki.

== Background ==
Born in the city of Nasiriyah in southern Iraq, he graduated from the Military Engineering College in 1979 and was assigned to the Military Works Division where his duties consisted of building military camps and other constructions. According to official sources he never participated in any military operations. He was detained during the 1991 uprising and retired as Brig. Gen. in 2000. He went on to study law at Basra University and became and acting member of the Governing Council. He served as an advisor for regional affairs with the National Security Ministry as well as a member of the Constitutional Committee.

== Experience ==
- Former Officer in the Iraqi Army with the rank of Brigadier General
- Consultant Engineer
- Director of the Basra water project (1979)
- Head of the Technical Department of the Director of Marine Affairs (1983)
- Project Manager of Hyundai (1985)
- Director of Affairs of the Southern Areas of Iraq (1991-2000)
- President of the Municipal Council of Dhi-Qar (2003)
- Undersecretary of Ministry of Works and Municipalities (2004)
- Regional Affairs Advisor of the National Security Council (2005)
- Member of the National Assembly of Iraq (2005-2006)
- Member of the Iraqi Constitution Writing Committee
- Deputy Chairman of the Construction and Services Committee of the Iraqi

National Assembly

- Member of the Iraqi Parliament (2006)
- Minister of State for National Security Affairs (2006-2010)
- Minister of Transportation (2007 & 2008)
- Member of the Iraqi Parliament (2010-2014)
- Member of the Parliament’s Integrity Committee
- President’s Advisor of the Security Affairs (Currently)
