= Abdul Karim al-Anizi =

Iraqi politician

Abdul Karim Ayyashi al-Anizi is an Iraqi politician and a member of the National Assembly of Iraq, representing Islamic Dawa Party - Iraq Organisation, the fifth largest party within the ruling United Iraqi Alliance coalition.

He served as Minister of State for National Security under the Iraqi Transitional Government. In May 2005 he was tipped as a possible compromise candidate for Prime Minister after Ibrahim al-Jaafari was vetoed by the Alliance's Kurdish and Sunni coalition partners.
