= Salam al-Maliki =

Iraqi politician

Minister of Transport
- In office May 2005 – May 2006
- President: Jalal Talabani
- Prime Minister: Ibrahim al-Jaafari
- Succeeded by: Karim Mahdi Salih

Salam Aodeh al-Maliki is an Iraqi politician who served as Minister of Transport in the Iraqi Transitional Government from May 2005 to May 2006.

In August 2005, he banned the sale of alcohol at Baghdad International Airport, saying it gave visitors a bad first impression of Iraq.
