= Dindar Najman =

Iraqi politician

Displacement and Migration Minister
- Incumbent
- Assumed office December 2010
- Prime Minister: Nouri Al Maliki

Personal details
- Born: Dindar Najman Shafiq Duski
- Party: Islamic Union of Kurdistan

Dindar Najman is an Iraqi Kurdish politician who is displacement and migration minister in the second cabinet of Nouri Maliki. He is one of the leaders of the Kurdistan Islamic union.

== Career ==
Najman is a lawmaker and one of the leaders of the Patriotic Union of Kurdistan led by Jalal Talabani. He was appointed displacement and migration minister to the cabinet headed by Nouri Maliki in 2010. In the cabinet, Duski is part of the Kurdish Alliance.
