= Ali al-Adeeb =

Iraqi politician

Ali Al-Adeeb
- علي الأديب

Minister of Higher Education and Scientific Research
- In office 21 December 2010 – 8 September 2014
- President: Jalal Talabani
- Prime Minister: Nouri al-Maliki
- Preceded by: Abd Dhiyab al-Ajili
- Succeeded by: Hussain al-Shahristani

Personal details
- Born: 1944 (age 81–82) Karbala, Iraq
- Party: Islamic Dawa Party
- Children: 5
- Education: Al-Mustansiriya University; University of Baghdad
- Profession: Politician

Ali Mohammad Al-Hussein Ali Al-Adeeb (Arabic: علي بن محمد الحسين علي الأديب) is an Iraqi politician and a senior member of the Islamic Dawa Party. In April 2006 he was tipped by the United Iraqi Alliance as a candidate for the post of Prime Minister, after their original choice, Ibrahim Jaafari, was vetoed by the Kurdistani Alliance and Iraqi Accord Front.

Al-Adeeb was born in Karbala in 1944 and went to secondary school in Baghdad. He obtained a degree in Literature and Education from the Baghdad University and taught Psychology.

While Saddam Hussein was the President of Iraq, Al-Adeeb was exiled to Iran, where he headed the Teheran-based Political Bureau of the Dawa party and took the nickname "Abu Bilal". He returned to Iraq in 2003 after the invasion.

Al-Adeeb was appointed to the committee that drafted the Constitution of Iraq in 2004, and has been a member of the Iraqi Parliament since 2005. He served 2 consecutive terms in the parliament before being appointed the Minister of Higher education and Scientific research in 27 December 2014.

== Sources ==
- Profile
