= Rafi al-Issawi =

Iraqi politician

Rafi Hiyad al-Issawi
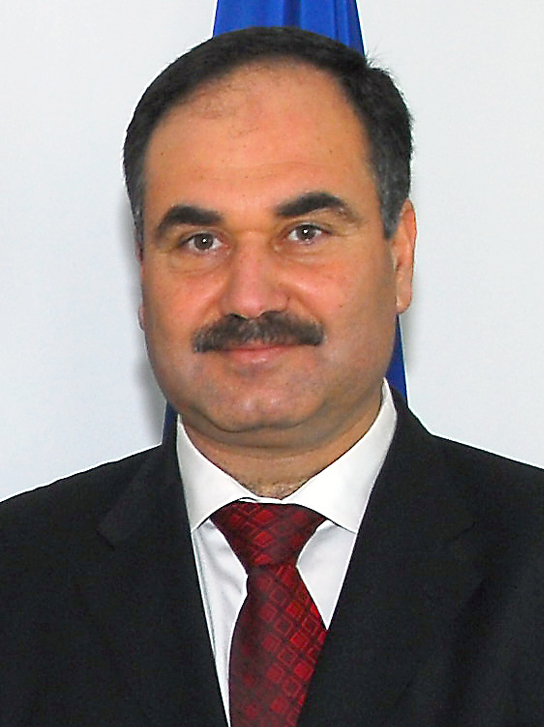
- Issawi in 2009

Minister of Finance
- In office 22 December 2010 – 1 March 2013
- Prime Minister: Nouri al-Maliki
- Preceded by: Baqir Jabr al-Zubeidi
- Succeeded by: Ali Yousif Al-Shukri (acting)

Deputy Prime Minister of Iraq
- In office 19 July 2008 – 22 December 2010 Serving with Barham Salih and Rowsch Shaways
- Prime Minister: Nouri al-Maliki
- Preceded by: Salam al-Zobaie
- Succeeded by: Saleh al-Mutlaq; Hussein al-Shahristani

Personal details
- Born: 2 March 1966 (age 60) Anbar, Iraq
- Party: National Future Gathering

Rafi Hiyad al-Issawi (born 2 March 1966) is an Iraqi politician who is a former finance minister and deputy prime minister. A doctor by profession, he is the fourth most senior politician from the Sunni Arab minority after former Vice President Tariq al-Hashemi, Deputy Prime Minister Saleh al-Mutlak and Speaker of the Iraqi Parliament, Usama al-Nujayfi.

== Early life and education ==
Issawi was born in Anbar in 1966. He comes from the Albu Issa tribe. This tribe is the dominant tribe in an area of around 80 square kilometers south of the city of Fallujah, in the western province of Al-Anbar.

He trained as an orthopedic surgeon in Baghdad and Basra, before becoming the head of the Fallujah hospital. He was in that role during the Second Battle of Fallujah in November 2004 and he reported that 800 local Iraqis had died as a result of the attack. He accused the United States Army of blocking a team of eleven Iraqi ministry of health ambulances with 20 doctors from evacuating the dead and injured or helping the injured. A few months earlier he had accused the US Army of "constantly attacking ambulances", saying that an ambulance driver had been killed in a September 2004 bombing aimed at the leader of Al-Qaeda in Iraq, Abu Musab al-Zarqawi.

== Political career ==
Following the December 2005 election and six months of negotiations, a "government of national unity" was agreed between the four main coalitions, under the leadership of Prime Minister Nouri al-Maliki. Issawi, a member of the Iraqi Islamic Party which was part of the main Sunni Arab Iraqi Accordance Front coalition, became minister of state for foreign affairs from 20 May 2006. He withdrew from the government with four other ministers from the Front on 1 August 2007, demanding that the government of Nouri al-Maliki take stronger action against Shi'ite militias. The Front rejoined the government on 19 July 2008 and Issawi was approved as deputy prime minister.

Prior to the 2010 elections, he formed his own party, the National Future Gathering, which joined the Iraqiyya coalition. He became the Minister of Finance in the Al Maliki II Government which was formed on 22 December 2010 after nine months of negotiations.

In December 2011, he started a boycott the cabinet, along with all but four of the other Iraqiyya ministers. An adviser to the Prime Minister said Issawi had been linked to al Qaeda in Iraq, although the Americans in 2010 had said that a thorough investigation of these allegations had determined that they were groundless. Issawi called for the resignation of Prime Minister Maliki, following the issuance of an arrest warrant for Vice President Tariq al-Hashemi, saying Maliki was trying to "build a dictatorship".

=== Attacks and resignation ===
On 1 January 2012, Issawi was attacked by an improvised explosive device whilst driving. The attack wounded two of his security guards and was described as an "attempted assassination". On 19 December 2012, he reported that nearly 150 of his guards and staff members had been arrested. He was also attacked on 13 January 2013. A bomb was detonated near to his convoy. Issawi was not hurt in attack that occurred while his convoy was heading to Fallujah to meet with tribal leaders. He resigned from his position in protest against Maliki's policies on 1 March 2013.

Political offices
Preceded by Salam al-Zaubai	Deputy Prime Minister of Iraq; 2008–2010	Succeeded by Saleh al-Mutlak
Preceded by Baqir Jabr al-Zubeidi	Minister of Finance; 2010–2012	Succeeded by TBD
