= Baraa Najib al-Ruba'i =

Iraqi politician

Baraa Najib al-Ruba'i (Also spelt Al-Rubaiy) is an Iraqi politician from Baghdad, and a member of the National Assembly of Iraq who was proposed as a possible Defense Minister in May 2006.

He comes from a royal family that oversees the Rabi’a tribe (Now the Al-Rubaiy family). His father, Muhammad Najib al-Ruba'i was a prominent officer under the monarchy who was appointed chairman of the three-member Presidential Council by General Abdul Karim Qassem. A graduate of Sandhurst military college in Britain, he worked with the CIA in Amman on the 1996 coup attempt along with Iyad Allawi’s Iraqi National Accord.
