= Safa al-Safi =

Iraqi politician

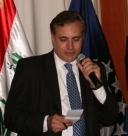
Safa al-Safi

Safa al-Din (also Safauddin) Mohammed al-Safi is an Iraqi politician and former Justice Minister. He currently serves as Minister of State for the Council of Representatives.

Since May 2006 he has also been Minister of State for Council of Representatives Affairs. He became acting Justice Minister in the government of Nouri al-Maliki from April 2007. He also replaced Abdul Falah al-Sudany as acting Minister of Trade in 2007 following his resignation amidst corruption allegations.

As Minister of State in September 2008, he called for MP Mithal al-Alusi to be prosecuted for "visiting a country that Iraq considers an enemy" after he visited Israel and spoke at a conference on counter-terrorism.

In July 2011 the Higher Judicial Council issued an arrest warrant on allegations of corruption relating to his time as acting Trade Minister. A judge in Basrah also issued a second arrest warrant for the minister on allegations of administrative and financial corruption linked to his time as acting Minister of Trade.
