= Salam al-Zaubai =

Iraqi politician (died 2022)

- سلام الزوبعي
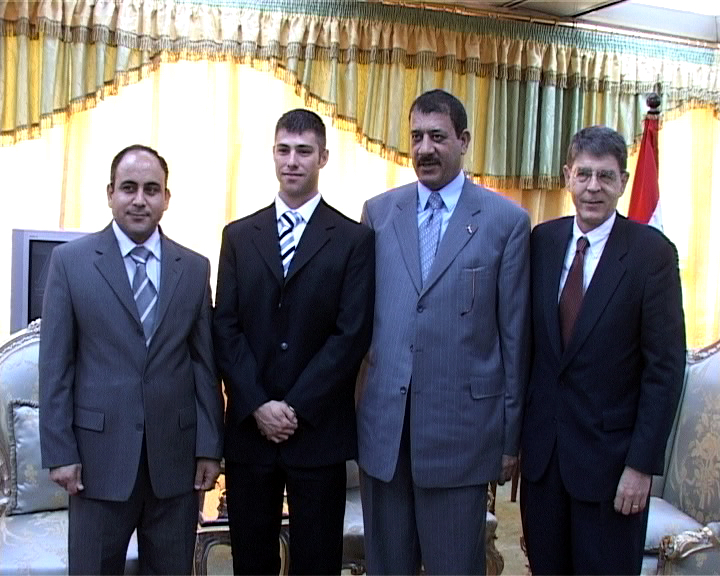
- DPM Salam al-Zaubai (second from right)

Deputy Prime Minister of Iraq
- In office 20 May 2006 – 1 August 2007
- President: Jalal Talabani
- Prime Minister: Nouri al-Maliki

Minister of Defence
- Acting
- In office 20 May 2006 – 8 June 2006
- President: Jalal Talabani
- Prime Minister: Nouri al-Maliki

Personal details
- Born: 1958/1959
- Died: 19 December 2022 (aged 62–64) India

Salam al-Zaubai (Note: Arabic: سلام الزوبعي) (1958/1959 – 19 December 2022) was an Iraqi politician who was the Deputy Prime Minister of Iraq from 20 May 2006 to 1 August 2007 as well as the acting Defence Minister from 20 May 2006 to 8 June 2006. He was elected to the Iraqi National Assembly in December 2005 as part of the Sunni Arab-led Iraqi Accord Front list.

He was from a well known tribe, the Zoba'a, and headed the Agriculture Engineers Union.

On 23 March 2007, al-Zaubai was wounded in an attack involving a suicide bombing and car bombing at a mosque near his home in Baghdad, and he was taken to a U.S. military hospital in the Green Zone for surgery. His adviser was reportedly killed in the attack, along with a number of his guards. A brother and cousin of al-Zaubai, as well as the mosque's imam, were also said to have been killed. The bomber attacked al-Zubaie a day after an al-Qaida umbrella group, the Islamic State of Iraq called him a stooge “to the crusader occupiers.” Hours after the assassination attempt the group claimed responsibility for the bombing. On 28 March, he was moved to Amman, Jordan for treatment at the King Hussein Medical Center, and he was released from the hospital on 3 April.

Al-Zaubai died in India on 19 December 2022, after traveling there for medical treatment.
