= Al Maliki I government =

First Iraqi government after the 2003 invasion (2006–2010)

- 1st government of the Republic of Iraq
- 2005–2010
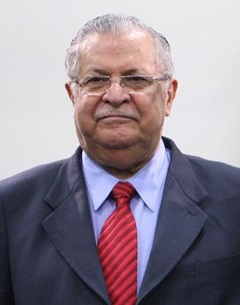
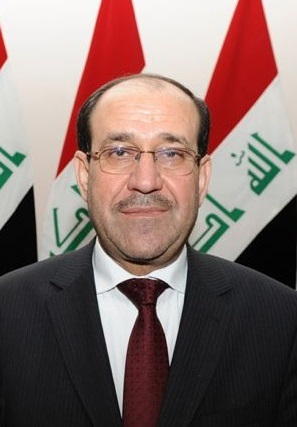
- Iraqi president Jalal Talabani and prime minister Nouri al-Maliki
- Date formed: 20 May 2005
- Date dissolved: 22 December 2010

People and organisations
- President: Jalal Talabani
- Prime Minister: Nouri al-Maliki
- Member parties: National Iraqi Alliance (majority, part of coalition government); Iraqi Accord Front; Kurdistan List; Iraqi National List

History
- Legislature term: Iraqi National Assembly
- Predecessor: Transitional
- Successor: Al Maliki II government

The first Al-Maliki government was the government of Iraq from 20 May 2005 until 22 December 2010. It was formed with approval from the Iraqi National Assembly, now the Council of Representatives, following the general elections held on December 2005, succeeding the Iraqi transitional government which had led the country in a caretaker capacity until the new government was formed and confirmed.

The Al Maliki I government consisted of the National Iraqi Alliance, which had a majority in the National Assembly, alongside the Iraqi Accord Front, Kurdistani List and Iraqi National List, and would lead Iraq until 2010, when it was succeeded by the Al Maliki II government, which would then remain in office until 2014.

== Process of formation ==
After some disputes over the election results, the members of the new Iraqi National Assembly were sworn in on March 16, 2006. In the meantime, negotiations over the forming of a government had begun. Leaders of the four largest political groupings called for a government of national unity. Although it was decided in advance that the largest grouping (the United Iraqi Alliance) would name the Prime Minister, this decision would be disputed by the member parties, both within the Alliance and in the negotiations with other groupings, who rejected the first nominee, incumbent Prime Minister Ibrahim al-Jaafari; Nouri al-Maliki would be elected as Prime Minister as a result.

=== Alleged no-confidence vote plot ===
In December 2006, Iraqi media reported an alleged plot to oust Maliki in a no-confidence vote and to create a new governmental alliance between SCIRI, UIA independents, the Kurdistani Alliance and Iraqi Islamic Party. Adil Abdul Mahdi had been proposed as the new Prime Minister, but SCIRI MP Hameed Maalah was quoted saying the groups hadn't yet agreed on a new leader. A Maliki aide confirmed the plot but said they intended to sabotage it. A no-confidence vote would require a simple majority but a new Prime Minister would require a two-thirds majority.

== Agenda ==
The al-Maliki government was primarily responsible for maintaining the relationship with the United States and coalition forces, containing the insurgency and inter-communal violence and implementing and possibly amending the constitution, particularly with regards federalism.

=== Federalism and the Constitution of Iraq ===
One of the main areas faced by the new government was the issue of federalism, which includes the formation of one or more Shi'ite regions, the status of Kirkuk and any possible amendment to the Constitution of Iraq

==== Constitutional amendments ====
Under a compromise agreed in September 2005 between the United Iraqi Alliance, Democratic Patriotic Alliance of Kurdistan and Iraqi Islamic Party, the new Assembly would consider amendments to the constitution in its first four months. Following this compromise the Iraqi Islamic Party agreed to back the constitution in the referendum. A constitutional revision committee was eventually formed under the new parliament, which issued an incomplete report in 2007. Despite widespread agreement amongst a majority of parties in Iraq that the text is in need of revision, partly in order to clarify some technical issues but also in part in order to bring the constitution more closely in line with the Iraqi mainstream, the constitutional revision process has not made any progress through parliament since 2007.

==== Federalism ====
Article 114 of the constitution of Iraq provided that no new region may be created before the Iraqi National Assembly has passed a law which provides the procedures for forming the region. This law was passed on 11 October after an agreement was reached with the Iraqi Accord Front to form the constitutional review committee and to defer implementation of the law for 18 months. Legislators from the Iraqi Accord Front, Sadrist Movement and Islamic Virtue Party all opposed the bill.

==== Governorate elections ====
Interim councils were elected in each of the Governorates of Iraq in the Iraqi Governorate elections of 2005. One of the tasks of the government was to pass a law to regulate the powers of the governorates and the process of elections. The law was finally passed by the Council of Representatives of Iraq in February 2008. It was vetoed by the Presidency Council at first, on the grounds that giving the Prime Minister the power to dismiss Governors would contravene the constitution. However, the Council reversed its position following protests from the Sadrist Movement, saying they would seek changes to the law before it came into force.

==== Kirkuk ====
Meanwhile, the Kurdistan Alliance wants Kurds who were expelled from Kirkuk to be allowed to return to the city and for the Kurdistan Region to be expanded. This currently includes the governorates of As-Sulaymāniyyah, Arbīl and Dahūk, and the Kurds would like this expanded to include Kirkuk and parts or all of Diyala and Ninawa. However, this move is opposed by Turkmen and Arabs in Kirkuk and by neighbouring Turkey. The Iraqi newspaper, 'Al-Furat, reported 2006-03-05 that this is also opposed by Jaafari, and one of the reasons why the Kurds opposed his nomination. The al-Maliki government announced in its programme that the referendum to determine Kirkuk's status would be held on 15 November 2007.

Kurdish politicians had also requested that the proportion of oil revenues retained by the regions be increased from 17% to 24%.

In August 2006 Maliki appointed a committee to "examine the status" of Kirkuk "in light of Iraq's federalist system", headed by Justice Minister Hashim al-Shibli, a Sunni Arab. The committee also including Interior Minister Jawad Bulani, a Shiite, Youth Minister Jasim Mohammed Jaafar, a Turkmen and four representatives from Kirkuk.

== Criticism ==
=== Basra slowdown ===
As soon as the government was formed, members of the Basra-based Islamic Virtue Party initiated a slowdown in response to their loss of control over the Ministry of Oil; in response, a state of emergency was imposed on June 2 and the Iraqi Army were deployed to key positions in Basra. A provincial security council was appointed by Prime Minister Maliki, consisting of:

- Safa al-Safi, Ministry of State for Parliamentary Affairs
- Salam al-Maliki, Sadr Movement
- Hadi Al-Amiri, Badr Organization
- Islamic Virtue Party representative
- Iraqi Accord Front representative
- three United Iraqi Alliance representatives

=== Alleged abuse of prisoners and operation of secret prisons ===
D+Z, a development magazine based in Germany, reported the administration had reverted to Saddam-era police tactics, including torture and extrajudicial executions. There have also been reports of secret prisons existing within Iraq as well.

== Key legislation passed ==
The government passed the following key items of legislation:

- The Federalism Law (October 2006), which provided for the formation of new regions of Iraq
- The Unified Retirement Law (October 2007), restored pensions to former Baathists
- The Accountability and Justice Law (January 2008), also known as the de-Baathification reforms, reinstated jobs and pensions to low-ranking Baath Party members, made the De-Baathification Commission permanent and extended de-Baathification to the judiciary. The law was passed by a majority vote by the Presidency Council after Vice President Tariq al-Hashimi refused to sign.
- The General Amnesty Law (February 2008) allowed for the pardoning and release of all prisoners detained for more than 6 months without charge or 12 months without trial, unless suspected of the most serious crimes.
- The Provincial Powers Act (February 2008) was passed by a majority of only 1 and detailed the division of powers between Governorates of Iraq and the federal government. The law gave the Prime Minister the power to dismiss governors. However, the Presidency Council vetoed this law, saying it violated the constitutions provisions on the powers of the governorates. It also provided for a Provincial Elections Law, to be passed within 90 days and new elections to be held by October 2008.

Preceded by Iraqi Transitional Government	Al Maliki I Government; 20 May 2006 – 22 December 2010	Succeeded by Al Maliki II Government
