= Liwaa Semeism =

Iraqi dentist and politician

Liwaa Semeism is an Iraqi politician from the Sadrist Movement and minister of state for tourism and archaeology affairs and then, tourism minister in the cabinets of Nouri Maliki.

== Career ==
A dentist by training, Semeism was appointed minister of state for tourism and archaeology affairs to the first cabinet of Maliki in 2006. He was part of al-Sadr's bloc. He began to serve as tourism minister in the cabinet of Maliki.

== Personal life ==
His wife is a member of the National Assembly of Iraq and related to Moqtadr al-Sadr.
