= National Iraqi Alliance =

National Iraqi Alliance الائتلاف الوطني العراقي
- Leader: Ammar al-Hakim
- Founded: 2005
- Ideology: Shia Islamism; Pro-Iran

The National Iraqi Alliance (NIA or INA; Arabic: الائتلاف الوطني العراقي, romanized: Al-I’tilāf al-Waṭanī al-‘Irāqī), also known as the Watani List, was an Iraqi electoral coalition that contested the 2010 Iraqi legislative election. The Alliance was mainly composed of Shi'a Islamist parties. The alliance was created by the Supreme Council for Islamic Revolution in Iraq (the at the time largest Shi'a party) to contest in the January 2005 and December 2005 under the name United Iraqi Alliance (UIA; Arabic: الائتلاف العراقي الموحد, romanized: Al-I’tilāf al-‘Irāqı al-Muwaḥḥad), when it included all Iraq's major Shi'a parties. The United Iraqi Alliance won both those of elections however later fell apart after several major parties (most notably the Sadr Movement) left the alliance due to disputes with Prime Minister Nouri al-Maliki and the Supreme Council.

The component parties contested the 2009 provincial elections separately but later that year started negotiations to revive the list. In August 2009, they announced the creation of the National Iraqi Alliance for the 2010 parliamentary election, this time without Prime Minister Nouri al-Maliki's Islamic Dawa Party, which formed the State of Law Coalition. Later that year the two lists would re-unite again, forming the National Alliance.

== Formation ==
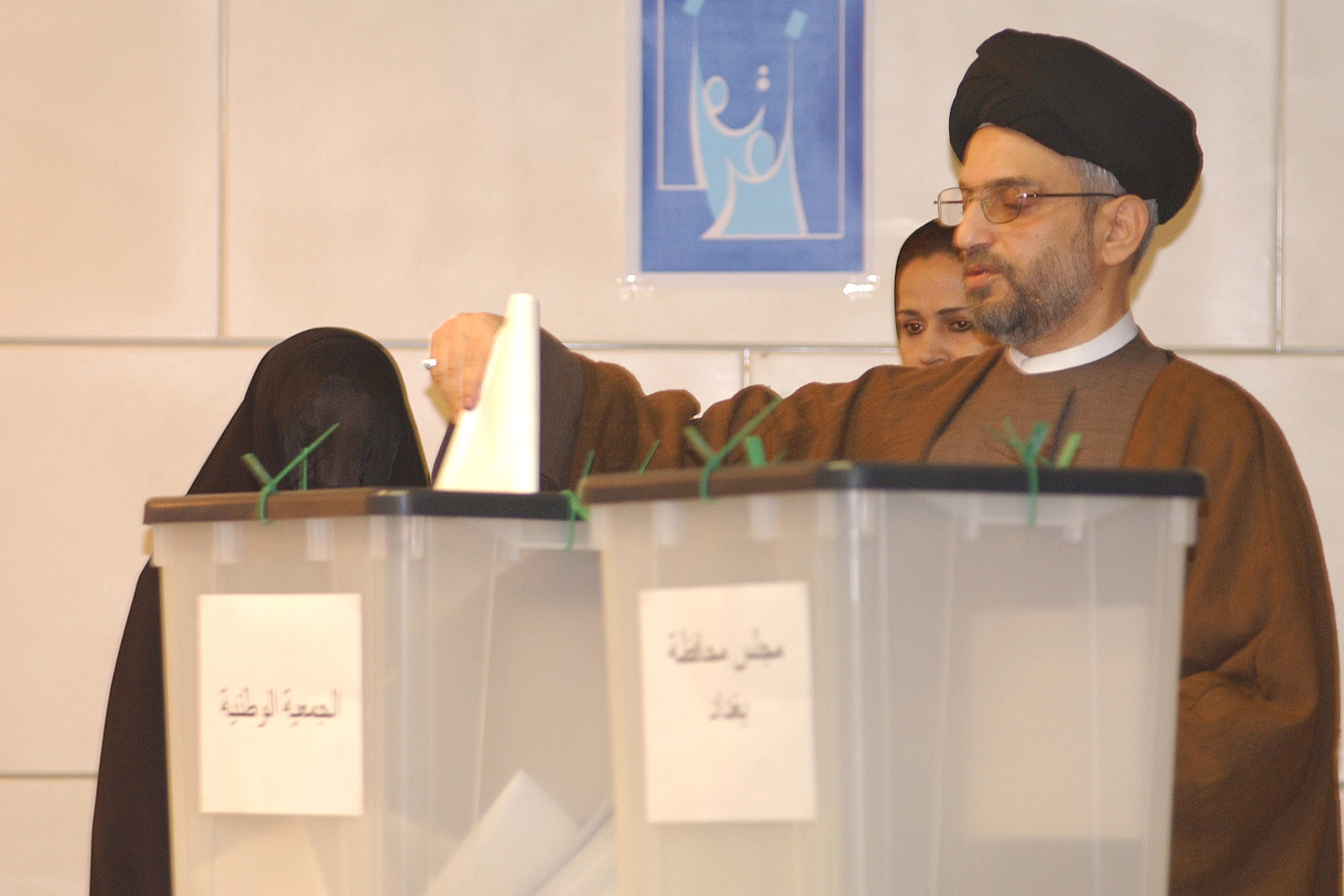
Abdul Aziz al-Hakim, leader of the Supreme Council for the Islamic Revolution in Iraq, casts his ballot at a poll station in Baghdad.

The Alliance formed in the lead-up to the January 2005 elections from mainly Shi’ite groups, most importantly the Supreme Council for the Islamic Revolution in Iraq, whose leader Abdul Aziz al-Hakim headed the list, and Islamic Dawa Party. Other important members included the secular Iraqi National Congress led by Ahmed Chalabi and the independent nuclear physicist Hussain Shahristani. It also included supporters of cleric Muqtada al-Sadr who preferred not to back his National Independent Cadres and Elites party, and a number of independent Sunni representatives. The coalition was widely believed to have been supported by senior Ayatollah Ali al-Sistani, the most widely respected religious figure in Iraq. Although Sistani offered no official endorsement, many in Iraq understood the UIA to be the "Sistani list."

The 22 parties included in the coalition, which was called List 228, were:

1. Supreme Council for the Islamic Revolution in Iraq (SCIRI)
2. Badr Organisation
3. Islamic Dawa Party (al-Dawa)
4. Islamic Dawa Party—Iraq Organisation
5. Islamic Virtue Party
6. Hezbollah Movement in Iraq
7. Hezbollah al-Iraq
8. Islamic Action Organisation
9. Sayyid Al-Shuhadaa Organisation
10. Shaheed Al-Mihrab Organisation
11. Iraqi National Congress (INC)
12. Centrist Assembly Party
13. Islamic Fayli Grouping in Iraq
14. Fayli Kurd Islamic Union
15. First Democratic National Party
16. Assembly “Future of Iraq”
17. Justice and Equality Grouping
18. Islamic Master of the Martyrs Movement
19. Islamic Union for Iraqi Turkomans
20. Turkmen Fidelity Movement

Many members of the Alliance had lived in exile in Iran, including Ibrahim al-Jaafari, Iraq's Prime Minister from 2005 to 2006, who led the Islamic Dawa Party. In 1980, thousands of al-Dawa supporters were imprisoned or executed after advocating replacing Saddam Hussein's secular Ba'ath Party government with an Islamic government. The Iranian government supported their efforts and allowed members of Al-Da’wa to seek exile in Iran.

The Alliance received 4.08 million votes (48.1%) in the election, which gave the bloc 140 seats on the 275-seat Council of Representatives of Iraq. The Alliance's nominees included 42 women. The Alliance formed a coalition Iraqi Transitional Government with the Democratic Patriotic Alliance of Kurdistan. Ibrahim al-Jaafari, leader of the Islamic Dawa Party, became the Prime Minister of Iraq and Jalal Talabani of the Kurdistani Alliance became the President of Iraq.

In March 2005, the Iraqi Turkmen Front agreed to join the UIA’s caucus in the National Assembly. In return, Sistani reportedly pledged support for the recognition of Iraqi Turkmen as a national minority.

== December 2005 Parliamentary Election ==
The Iraqi National Congress left the alliance prior to the December 2005 elections, which also brought the Sadrist Movement more firmly into the Alliance. Al-Sistani also stated that he would not support any party in this election.

The election saw an increased turnout, mainly because the Sunni Arab population decided not to boycott. The alliance won 5.0 million votes (41.2%) an increase of 23% in the number of votes but a reduction of 6.9% in the vote share. They gained 128 seats, 12 fewer than the previous election.

Analysis of the seat allocation after the elections showed that the 109 district seats and 19 compensatory seats won by the UIA were split as follows:

Split of United Iraqi Alliance seats by party (includes 2 members from The Upholders of the Message who caucus with the UIA)
Party	District Seats	Compensatory Seats	Total
SCIRI & Badr Organization	21	15	36
Sadrist Movement	27	2	29
Islamic Virtue Party	14	1	15
Islamic Dawa Party	13	0	13
Islamic Dawa Party - Iraq Organisation	12	0	12
Independents and others	24	1	25
Total	111	19	130

Other parties include:

- Centrist Coalition Party
- Turkman Islamic Union of Iraq
- Justice and Equality Assembly
- Iraqi Democratic Movement
- Movement of Hizbullah in Iraq
- Turkmen Loyalty Movement
- Saed Al Shuhada Islamic Movement
- Al Shabak Democratic Gathering
- Malhan Al Mkoter
- Reform And Building Meeting
- The Justice Community
- Iraq Ahrar

Following the election, the Islamic Virtue Party withdrew from the Alliance, saying they wanted to "prevent blocs forming on a sectarian basis". This followed differences with Prime Minister Nouri al-Maliki over control of the Oil Ministry in the Government of Iraq from 2006. This was followed in September 2007 by the Sadrist Movement, who complained the Alliance was "dominated by some parties".

The Alliance formed a coalition with the Kurdistani Alliance, the Sunni Arab-majority Iraqi Accord Front and the secularist Iraqi National List. The Alliance nominated Jaafari for another term as prime minister, but his appointment was blocked by the Alliance's coalition partners. Nouri al-Maliki, a deputy leader of the Islamic Dawa Party was agreed instead.

== National Iraqi Alliance: 2010 Parliamentary Election ==
The component parties of the United Iraqi Alliance contested the 2009 provincial elections separately and in August 2009, they announced a new coalition for the 2010 parliamentary election without Prime Minister Maliki's Islamic Dawa Party. The new alliance was called the National Iraqi Alliance. The chairman of the group is former Iraqi Prime Minister Ibrahim al-Jaafari.

The parties taking part in the National Iraqi Alliance for the 2010 elections include:

- Supreme Islamic Iraqi Council (ISCI) - led by Ammar al-Hakim
  - Badr Organisation - led by Hadi al-Amiri
  - Hezbollah Movement in Iraq - led by Hassan al-Sari
  - Sayyid al-Shuhada - led by Daghir al-Musawi
- Sadr Movement - led by Muqtada al-Sadr
- National Reform Trend (Islah) - led by Ibrahim al-Jaafari
- Islamic Virtue Party (Fadhilah) led by Abd al-Rahim al-Hasini
- Islamic Dawa Party - Tanzim al-Dakhli - led by Abdul Karim al-Anizi
- Iraqi National Congress (INC) - led by Ahmad Challabi
- Anbar Salvation Council - led by Hamid Hayes
- Solidarity Bloc (Tadamun) - led by Qassim Daoud
- Gathering of Justice and Unity - led by Sheikh al-Faiz
- Turkmeneli Political Party
- Shiite Turkmen Movement
- Constitutional Monarchy Movement - led by Sharif Ali bin al-Hussein
- The party belonging to the Bahr al-Ulloum family - led by Mohammad Bahr al-Ulloum
- The party led by Khalid Abd al-Wahhab al-Mulla
- Several Independent politicians.

=== Results ===
Governorate	Votes	Percentage	Seats Won	Total Seats
Anbar	4,805	1.0%	0	14
Babil	180,193	30.7%	5	16
Baghdad	561,659	22.1%	17	68
Basra	237,010	29.1%	7	24
Dhi Qar	244,818	42.8%	9	18
Diyala	85,821	17.1%	3	13
Dahuk	179	0.04%	0	10
Erbil	404	0.06%	0	14
Karbala	81,794	24.5%	3	10
Kirkuk	12,517	2.3%	0	12
Maysan	135,319	49.6%	6	10
al-Muthanna	71,699	31.3%	3	7
Najaf	152,698	37.1%	5	12
Ninawa	38,693	3.7%	0	31
al-Qadisiyyah	133,821	35.8%	5	11
Salah ad-Din	21,260	2.6%	0	12
Sulaymaniyah	188	0.02%	0	17
Wasit	129,188	34.3%	4	11
Compensatory seats	-	28.6%	2	7
Total:	2,092,066	18.2%	70	325

Split of National Iraqi Alliance seats by party
Party	District Seats	Compensatory Seats	Total
Sadrist Movement	39	0	39
ISCI & Badr Organization	17	1	18
Islamic Virtue Party (Fadhila)	6	0	6
National Reform Trend	1	1	2
Independents and others	5	0	5
Total	68	2	70

Among the five seats not belonging to the INA's 4 major parties, 1 seat went to ISCI affiliated Hezbollah in Iraq, 1 seat went to the Iraqi National Accord (Ahmad Challabi's seat) and 1 went to the Basra-based Shaykhi party: Gathering of Justice and Unity.

== April 2014 parliamentary election ==
The alliance formed following the 2014 parliamentary election includes the Sadrist Movement. The coalition also includes the Badr Organization, the Al-Muwatin coalition and the State of Law Coalition.

== See also ==
- List of Islamic political parties
