= National Shiite Movement =

National Shiite Movement التيار الوطني الشيعي
- Leader: Muqtada al-Sadr
- Founded: 2003
- Headquarters: Najaf
- Militia formation: Saraya al-Salam
- Ideology: Shia Islamism; Religious conservatism
- Religion: Shia Islam
- National affiliation: Al-Ahrar Bloc (2014–2018); Alliance Towards Reforms (Saairun) (2018–2021)
- Seats in the Council of Representatives of Iraq: 0 / 329
- Seats in the local governorate councils: 0 / 440
- Governors: 0 / 18

Website
- www.jawabna.com

The National Shiite Movement (Arabic: التيار الوطني الشيعي), also known as the Sadrist Movement (Arabic: التيار الصدري, romanized: al-Tayyār al-Sadrī), is an Iraqi Shia Islamic national movement and political party, led by Muqtada al-Sadr.

The Sadrist Movement ended as largest political party in the October 2021 Iraqi parliamentary election, with 73 seats in Parliament, but in June 2022, during the 2021–2022 Iraqi political crisis, Muqtada al-Sadr’s bloc resigned from parliament.

== 2009 governorate elections ==
In the 2009 governorate elections, the Sadrist Movement took part as the Independent Free Movement List, receiving 9.8% of the vote and winning 43 out of 440 seats, in third place behind the State of Law Coalition and the Islamic Supreme Council of Iraq.

Governorate	Percentage	Seats won	Total seats
Anbar	-	0	29
Babil	6.2%	3	30
Baghdad	9%	5	57
Basra	5%	3	35
Dhi Qar	14.1%	7	31
Diyala	3.1%	0	29
Karbala	6.8%	4	27
Maysan	14.6%	7	27
Muthanna	5.5%	2	26
Najaf	12.2%	6	28
Nineveh	-	0	37
Qadisiyyah	6.7%	3	28
Saladin	-	0	28
Wasit	6.0%	3	28
Total:	9.8%	43	440

== 2010 parliamentary election ==
In the 2010 parliamentary election, the Sadrist Movement ran as part of the National Iraqi Alliance. At a press conference on 6 March, ahead of the election]], Muqtada al-Sadr called on all Iraqis to participate in the election and support those seeking the withdrawal of U.S. troops from the country. Al-Sadr warned that any interference by the United States would be unacceptable. Al-Sadr, who had thousands of staunch followers across Iraq, had been consistently opposing the presence of foreign forces and repeatedly called for an immediate end to the Iraq War.

Governorate	Seats won	Total seats
Anbar	-	14
Babil	5	16
Baghdad	12	68
Basra	3	24
Dhi Qar	4	18
Diyala	2	13
Dohuk	-	10
Erbil	0	14
Karbala	2	10
Kirkuk	0	12
Maysan	3	10
Muthanna	2	7
Najaf	3	12
Nineveh	0	31
Qādisiyyah	2	11
Saladin	0	12
Sulaymaniyah	-	17
Wasit	3	11
Compensatory seats	1	7
Minority seats	-	8
Total	42	325

== Splinter factions ==
Over time, numerous factions in the Sadrist Movement disagreed with Muqtada al-Sadr over various issues and broke off, forming separate militias and parties:

- Asa'ib Ahl al-Haq
- Abu al-Fadl al-Abbas Forces
- Jaysh al-Mu'ammal
- Tashkil al-Hussein al-Tha'ir
- Kata'ib al-Tayyar al-Risali
- Islamic Virtue Party

== Involvement in the Syrian civil war ==
In October 2012, various Iraqi religious sects joined the conflict in Syria on both sides. Shiites from Iraq, in Babil Governorate and Diyala Governorate, have traveled to Damascus from Baghdad, or from the Shiite holy city of Najaf, Iraq, claiming to protect Sayyida Zeinab, an important Shiite shrine in Damascus. Abu Mohamed, with the Sadrist trend, said he recently received an invitation from the Sadrists' leadership to discuss the shrine in Damascus. A senior Sadrist official and former member of Parliament, said that convoys of buses from Najaf, under the cover story of pilgrims, were carrying weapons and fighters to Damascus. Some of the pilgrims were members of Iran's Islamic Revolutionary Guards Corps' Elite Quds Force.

However, later in 2017 following the Khan Shaykhun chemical attack in Syria, Muqtada al-Sadr called for Syria's president Bashar al-Assad to step down from power.

== 2014 parliamentary elections ==
In the 2014 parliamentary elections, the Sadrists formed the Al-Ahrar Bloc (Arabic: كتلة الأحرار, romanized: Kotlat Al-Ahrar or freeones Bloc), headed by Dia al-Asadi, which strongly opposed a third term for al-Maliki and his State of Law Coalition. Al-Ahrar won 7% of the vote and 34 seats, making it the second largest group in the Iraqi parliament, after the State of Law Coalition, which won 24% and 92 seats. The seats were divided as follows:

Governorate	Seats Won	Total Seats
Anbar	–	15
Babil	3	17
Baghdad	6	69
Basra	3	25
Dahuk	–	11
Dhi Qar	2	19
Diyala	1	14
Erbil	–	15
Karbala	2	11
Kirkuk	–	12
Maysan	3	10
Muthanna	1	7
Najaf	2	12
Ninawa	–	31
Qādisiyyah	2	11
Salah ad-Din	–	12
Sulaymaniyah	–	18
Wasit	3	11
Minority seats	-	8
Total	34*	325

* includes: Other allied forces - 6 seats

== 2018 parliamentary elections ==
In preparation for the 2018 parliamentary election, Sadr withdrew the Al-Ahrar Bloc from parliament and urged its MPs not to stand in the May poll, in order to make way for a new list known as Alliance Towards Reforms, mainly composed of the Sadrist Movement and the Iraqi Communist Party. This list finished as the largest party in the election on 12 May, with 14.38% of the votes and 54 seats in Parliament.

== 2021 parliamentary elections ==
The Sadrist Movement ended as the largest political party in the 10 October 2021 Iraqi parliamentary elections, with 10% of the votes and 73 seats in Parliament. On 13 June 2022, during the 2021–2022 Iraqi political crisis, 74 MPs from Muqtada al-Sadr's bloc resigned from parliament.
