= Nouri al-Maliki =

Prime Minister of Iraq from 2006 to 2014

- نوري المالكي
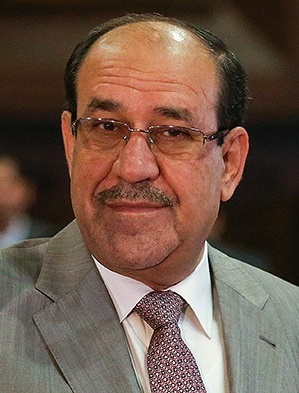
- Al-Maliki in 2018

Prime Minister of Iraq
- In office 20 May 2006 – 8 September 2014
- President: Jalal Talabani; Fuad Masum
- Deputy: See list: Salam al-Zaubai Barham Salih Rafi al-Issawi Rowsch Shaways Saleh al-Mutlaq Hussain al-Shahristani
- Preceded by: Ibrahim al-Jaafari
- Succeeded by: Haider al-Abadi

Vice President of Iraq
- In office 10 October 2016 – 2 October 2018 Serving with Osama al-Nujaifi and Ayad Allawi
- President: Fuad Masum
- Preceded by: Himself
- In office 9 September 2014 – 11 August 2015 Serving with Osama al-Nujaifi and Ayad Allawi
- President: Fuad Masum
- Preceded by: Khodair al-Khozaei
- Succeeded by: Himself

Minister of the Interior
- In office 21 December 2010 – 8 September 2014
- Prime Minister: Himself
- Preceded by: Jawad al-Bulani
- Succeeded by: Mohammed Al-Ghabban
- In office 20 May 2006 – 8 June 2006
- Prime Minister: Himself
- Preceded by: Baqir Jabr al-Zubeidi
- Succeeded by: Jawad al-Bulani

Minister of Defence
- In office 21 December 2010 – 17 August 2011
- Prime Minister: Himself
- Preceded by: Qadir Obeidi
- Succeeded by: Saadoun al-Dulaimi

Minister of National Security Affairs
- In office 21 December 2010 – 8 September 2014
- Prime Minister: Himself
- Preceded by: Shirwan al-Waili

Leader of the Islamic Dawa Party
- Incumbent
- Assumed office 1 May 2007
- Preceded by: Ibrahim al-Jaafari

Personal details
- Born: Nouri Kamil Mohammed Hasan al-Maliki; 20 June 1950 (age 76) Al-Hindiya, Kingdom of Iraq
- Party: Islamic Dawa
- Other political affiliations: State of Law Coalition
- Spouse: Faleeha Khalil
- Relations: Muhammad Hasan Abi al-Mahasin (grandfather)
- Children: 5
- Education: Usul al-Din College; University of Salahaddin (MA)
- Religion: Shia Islam

Nouri Kamil Muhammad-Hasan al-Maliki (Arabic: نوري كامل محمد حسن المالكي; born 20 June 1950), also known as Jawad al-Maliki (جواد المالكي) is an Iraqi politician and leader of the Islamic Dawa Party since 2007. He served as the prime minister of Iraq from 2006 to 2014 and as the vice president from 2014 to 2015 and again from 2016 to 2018.

Al-Maliki began his political career as a Shia dissident opposed to former Iraqi president Saddam Hussein in the late 1970s, and rose to prominence after he fled a death sentence and went into exile for 24 years. During his time abroad, he became a senior leader of the Islamic Dawa Party, coordinated the activities of anti-Saddam guerrillas, and built relationships with officials from the Islamic Republic of Iran and Ba'athist Syria, seeking their help in overthrowing Saddam's government. Both during and after the American-led occupation of Iraq (2003–2011), al-Maliki worked closely with the Multi-National Force (MNF–I), and continued to cooperate with the United States following the withdrawal from Iraq.

Three years after the 2003 invasion of Iraq, al-Maliki became the country's first post-Saddam full-term prime minister. The first-term al-Maliki administration succeeded the Iraqi Transitional Government; his first cabinet was approved by the Iraqi National Assembly and formally sworn in on 20 May 2006. His second cabinet, in which he also held the positions of acting Interior Minister, acting Defense Minister, and acting National Security Minister, was approved on 21 December 2010. In the wake of a string of defeats to the Islamic State during their Northern Iraq offensive, American officials said that al-Maliki should give up his premiership. Two months later under pressure, on 14 August 2014, he announced his resignation as prime minister.

During his eight years in power from 2006 to 2014, allegations of corruption were widespread, with hundreds of billions of dollars allegedly vanishing from government coffers. He was criticized by American officials and by local Iraqis for empowering Shia militias, for his close ties with Iranian government/military officials, and for fuelling Iraqi sectarian violence by favouring Shia political/military figures over Kurds and Sunni Arabs as well as other non-Shia minorities. In September 2014, al-Maliki was elected as one of three of Iraq's vice presidents, an office he held despite attempts to abolish the post.

== Early life and education ==
Nouri al-Maliki was born in the village of Janaja in Abu Gharaq, a central Iraqi town situated between Karbala and Al Hillah. He is a member of the Al-Ali Tribe, an offshoot of the Bani Malik tribe. He attended school in Al Hindiyah (Hindiya). Al-Maliki received his high school degree from Hindiya city and moved to Baghdad with his family. Al-Maliki lived for a time in Al Hillah, where he worked in the education department. His grandfather, Muhammad Hasan Abi al-Mahasin, was a poet and cleric who was the representative of the Revolutionary Council (Al-Majlis Al-Milli) of the Iraqi revolution against the British in 1920, and was Iraq's Minister of Education under King Faisal I.

== Exile and return to Iraq ==
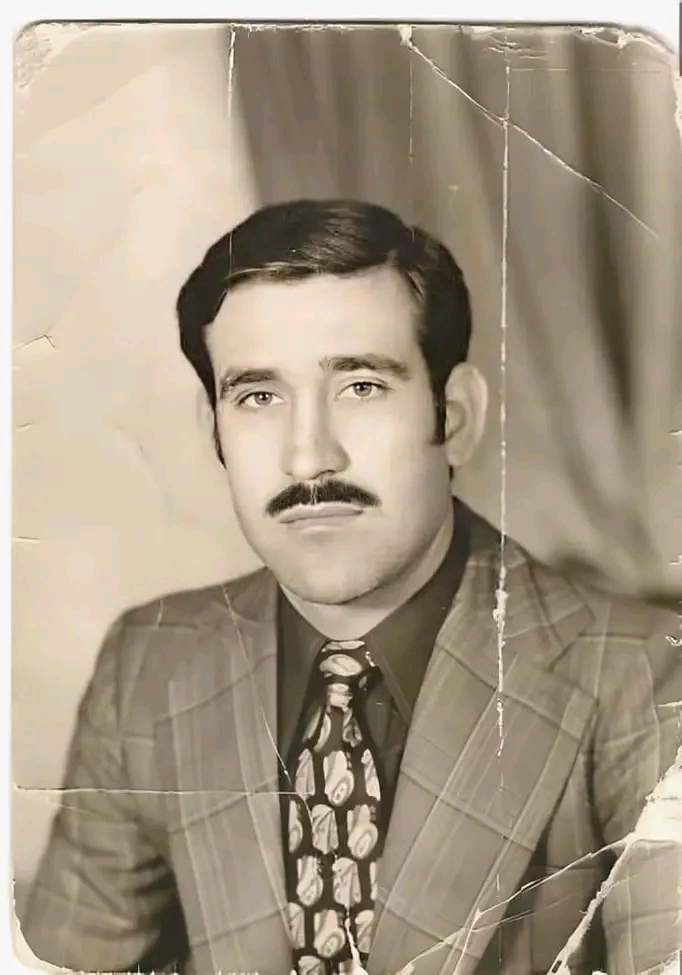
Al-Maliki during his youth

On 16 July 1979, al-Maliki fled Iraq after he was discovered to be a member of the outlawed Islamic Dawa Party. According to a brief biography on the Islamic Dawa Party's website, he left Iraq via Jordan in October, and soon moved to Syria, adopting the pseudonym "Jawad". He left Syria for Iran in 1982, where he lived in Tehran until 1990, before returning to Damascus where he remained until U.S.-led coalition forces invaded Iraq and toppled Saddam's regime in 2003. While living in Syria, he worked as a political officer for Dawa, developing close ties with Hezbollah and particularly with the Iranian government, supporting Iran's effort to topple Saddam's regime.

While living in Damascus, al-Maliki edited the party newspaper Al-Mawqif and rose to head the party's Damascus branch. In 1990, he joined the Joint Action Committee and served as one of its rotating chairman. The committee was a Damascus-based opposition coalition for a number of Hussein's opponents. The Dawa Party participated in the Iraqi National Congress between 1992 and 1995, withdrawing because of disagreements over who should head it.

Upon his return to his native Iraq after the fall of Saddam in April 2003, al-Maliki became the deputy leader of the Supreme National Debaathification Commission of the Iraqi Interim Government, formed to purge former Baath Party officials from the military and government. He was elected to the transitional National Assembly in January 2005. He was a member of the committee that drafted the new constitution that was passed in October 2005.

== Premiership ==
=== Selection as prime minister ===
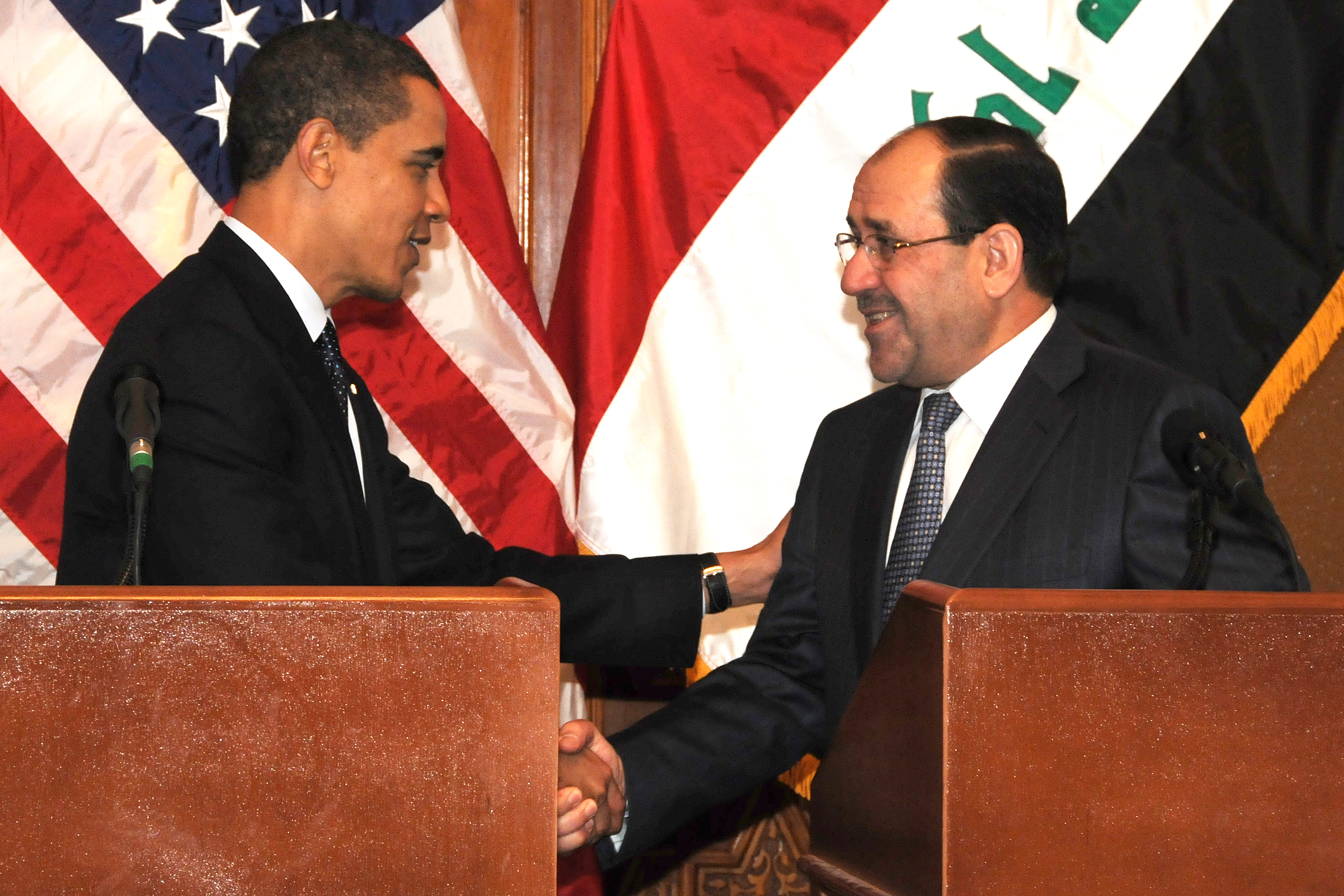
Prime Minister al-Maliki shakes hands with U.S. President Barack Obama in Baghdad, 7 April 2009

In the December 2005 Iraqi parliamentary election, the United Iraqi Alliance won the plurality of seats, and nominated Ibrahim al-Jaafari to be Iraq's first full-term post-war prime minister. In April 2006, amid mounting criticism of ineffective leadership and favoritism by Kurdish and Sunni Arab politicians in parliament, al-Jaafari was forced to resign from power. On 22 April 2006, following close U.S. involvement in the selection of a new prime minister, al-Maliki's name arose from the four that had been interviewed by the CIA on their connections to Iran (the others including Hussein al-Shahristani and Ali al-Adeeb).

United States Ambassador to Iraq Zalmay Khalilzad said that "[Maliki's] reputation is as someone who is independent of Iran." Khalilzad also maintained that Iran "pressured everyone for Jaafari to stay". However, al-Maliki was the preferred candidate of Qasem Soleimani, the commander of the Quds Force, and it was Soleimani who brokered the deal between senior Shiite and Kurdish leaders that led to his election as prime minister.

=== Al Maliki I government ===
On 20 May 2006, al-Maliki presented his Cabinet to Parliament, minus permanent ministers of Defense and of Interior. He announced that he would temporarily handle the Interior Ministry himself, and Salam al-Zobaie would temporarily act as Defense Minister. "We pray to God almighty to give us strength so we can meet the ambitious goals of our people who have suffered a lot", al-Maliki told the members of the assembly.

==== June–December 2006 ====
During his first term, al-Maliki vowed to crack down on insurgents who he called "organized armed groups who are acting outside the state and outside the law". He had been criticized for taking too long to name permanent interior and defense ministers, which he did on 8 June 2006, just as al-Maliki and the Americans announced the killing of Al Qaeda in Iraq leader Abu Musab al-Zarqawi. Meanwhile, al-Maliki criticized coalition armed forces as reports of allegedly deliberate killings of Iraqi civilians (at Haditha and elsewhere) became known. He has been quoted as saying, "[t]his is a phenomenon that has become common among many of the multinational forces. No respect for citizens, smashing civilian cars and killing on a suspicion or a hunch. It's unacceptable." According to Ambassador Khalilzad, al-Maliki had been misquoted, but it was unclear in what way.

The international Committee to Protect Journalists wrote to al-Maliki in June 2006, complaining of a "disturbing pattern of restrictions on the press" and of the "imprisonment, intimidation, and censorship of journalists".

His relationship with the press was often contentious. On 24 August 2006, for example, he banned television channels from broadcasting images of bloodshed in the country and warned of legal action against those violating the order. Major General Rashid Flayah, head of a national police division added "...We are building the country with Kalashnikovs and you should help in building it with the use of your pen". Early in his term, al-Maliki was criticized by some for alleged reluctance to tackle Shiite militias. In October 2006, he complained about an American raid against a Shiite militia leader because he said it had been conducted without his approval. Al-Maliki's job was complicated by the balance of power within parliament, with his position relying on the support of two Shiite blocs, that of Muqtada al-Sadr and the Supreme Islamic Iraqi Council of Abdul Aziz al-Hakim, that his Dawa party has often been at odds with. Progress was also frequently blocked by Sunni Arab politicians who alleged that the dominant Shiite parties were pursuing sectarian advantage. Al-Maliki had some success in finding compromise.

On 30 December 2006, al-Maliki signed the death warrant of Saddam Hussein and declined a stay of execution, saying there would be "no review or delay" in the event. Citing the wishes of relatives of Hussein's victims, he said, "Our respect for human rights requires us to execute him." Hussein's execution was carried out on 30 December 2006 (notably, the first Muslim day of the feast of Eid ul-Adha).

==== January 2007–2009 ====
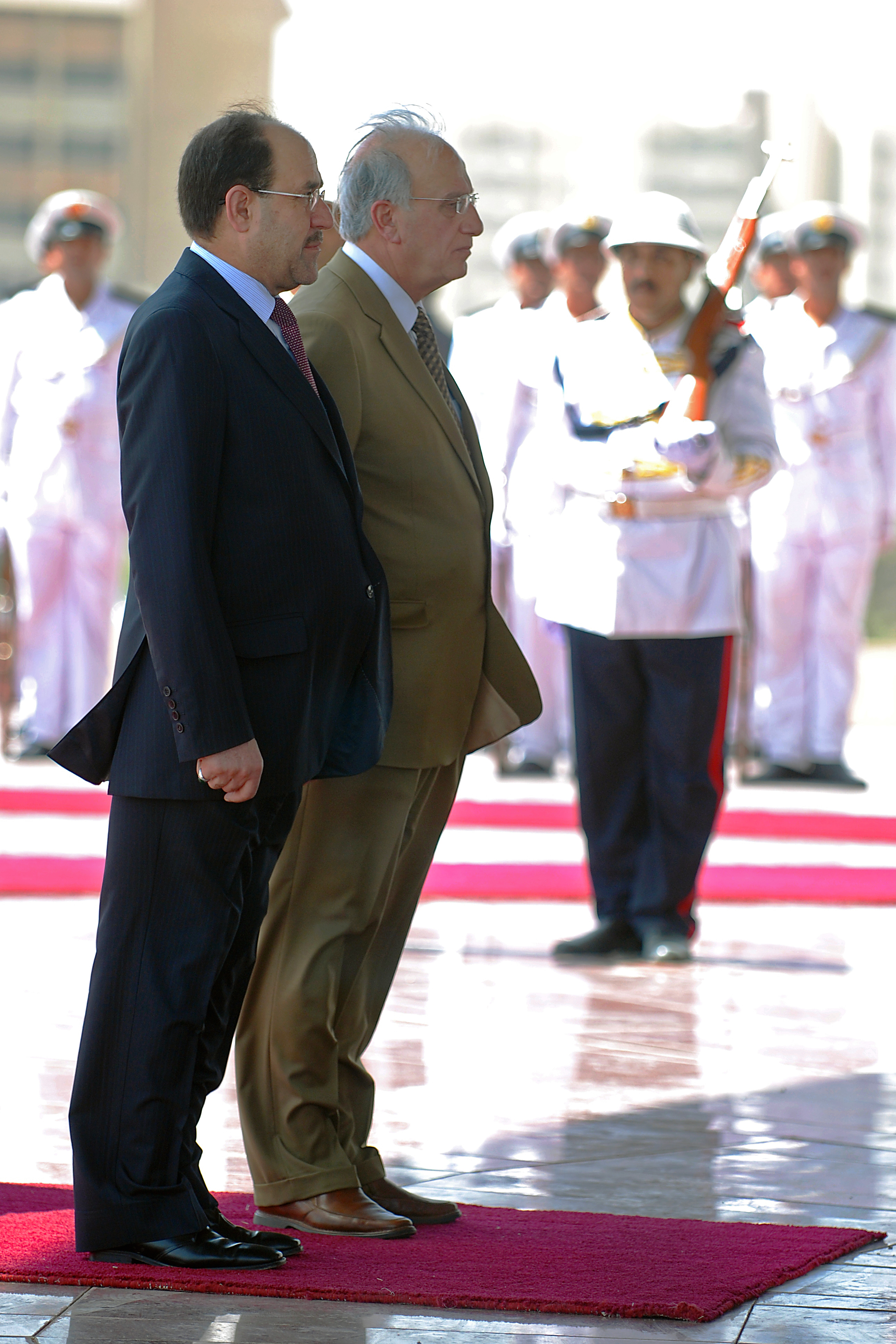
The celebration ceremony of Iraq's national sovereignty was attended by Iraq's prime minister, Nouri al-Maliki, left, and the Minister of Defense, Abd al-Qadir, right, Baghdad, 30 June 2009.

On 2 January 2007, the Wall Street Journal published an interview with al-Maliki in which he said he wished he could end his term before it expires in 2009.

In 2007, unnamed U.S. military officers alleged al-Maliki was replacing Iraqi commanders who had cracked down on Shiite militias with party loyalists. An al-Maliki spokesman denied the allegation.

In May 2007, the Islamic Dawa Party removed Jaafari and elected al-Maliki as Secretary-General of the Dawa Party.

In July 2008, al-Maliki, who earlier in the year fought off a recall effort in parliament, convinced Sunni politicians to end a year-long boycott [possibly in relation to the renewal, in December 2007, of UN mandate for U.S. operations in Iraq, without Iraqi parliament's approval?] of the chamber and appointed some of them to cabinet positions. Analysts said the return of the Sunnis was made possible by the security gains under al-Maliki and by apparent progress in negotiations with the United States over American military withdrawal.

By late 2008, al-Maliki started to stop transparency efforts by firing inspector generals. He also started using sections of the armed forces against his political rivals.

By October–November 2008, the al-Malki government had witnessed improvements in the security situation in many parts of the country. In Baghdad, a peace deal signed between Muqtada al-Sadr's Mahdi Army and the government had eased tensions, though sporadic sectarian incidents continued, as did occasional fighting between U.S. forces and Shiite militiamen, particularly in Sadr City.

Maliki in May 2009 talked about the need to make a secure and sustainable environment for investment in order for successful reconstruction and has enacted new investment laws to try to achieve this. He also acknowledged Iraq's unfortunate reliance on oil to finance reconstruction thus far, although the revenue began to be spent on other possible revenue sources including agriculture and energy.

=== Al Maliki II government ===
On 22 December 2010, al-Maliki's second government, including all main blocs in the new parliament, was unanimously approved by parliament, 9 months after the 2010 parliamentary election. On 5 February 2011, a spokesperson for al-Maliki said he would not run for a third term in 2014, limiting himself in the name of democracy, in a nod to the Arab Spring.

On 19 December 2011, the Vice President of Iraq, Tariq al-Hashemi, was accused of orchestrating bombing attacks and a hit squad killing Shiite politicians, and his arrest was warranted. This led to his Sunni/Shia Iraqiyya party (with 91 seats the largest party in parliament) boycotting parliament, which lasted until late January 2012. Hashemi was in September 2012 in absentia sentenced to death but had already fled to Turkey, which declared it will not extradite him to Iraq. This affair fueled Sunni Muslim and Kurdish resentment against Maliki who critics said was monopolizing power.

Al-Maliki lead Iraq through an increase in anti-Sunni violence, including the bloody crack-down on the 2012–2013 Sunni protests, which has been interpreted as leading to the rise of ISIS. The military under the al-Maliki administration was known for its corruption and was plagued with ghost soldiers, a corruption scheme with soldiers names on the pay rolls but not actually in service. When ISIS increased its activity in the first part of the 2013–2017 War in Iraq, Maliki led Iraq through major defeats, including the June 2014 northern Iraq offensive which saw the catastrophic collapse of the Iraqi army in that region and the fall of Mosul, where an army of 1,500 ISIS militants won over 60,000 Iraqi soldiers.

A former commander of the Iraqi ground forces, Ali Ghaidan, accused al-Maliki of being the one who issued the order to withdraw from the city of Mosul. By late June, the Iraqi government had lost control of its borders with both Jordan and Syria. al-Maliki called for a national state of emergency on 10 June following the attack on Mosul, which had been seized overnight. However, despite the security crisis, the Council of Representatives did not allow Maliki to declare a state of emergency; many Sunni Arab and Kurdish legislators boycotted the session because they opposed expanding the prime minister's powers.

By August 2014, al-Maliki was still holding on to power tenaciously despite Iraq's president Fuad Masum nominating Haidar al-Abadi to take over. Al-Maliki referred the matter to the federal court claiming the president's nomination was a "constitutional violation". He said: "The insistence on this until the end is to protect the state." On 14 August 2014, however, in the face of growing calls from the international community and members of his own party, Al-Maliki announced he was stepping down.

==== Sunni and Kurdish friction ====
Maliki's critics assert that he did his utmost to limit the power of both Kurds and Sunnis between 2006 and 2014. Their view is that Maliki worked to further centralise governance and amass greater controls and power—from militarily to legislative—for his party. Instead of strengthening and securing Iraq, Maliki's actions have led to a rise in both Kurdish nationalism and the outbreak of a Sunni insurgency, which has resulted in civil war and the effective failure of the Iraqi state.

The reign of al-Maliki has been described as sectarian by both Sunni Iraqis and western analysts; something which helped fuel a Sunni uprising in the country in 2014. During the Northern Iraq offensive, beginning in June 2014, ISIS vowed to take power away from al-Maliki, who called upon Kurdish Peshmerga forces to help keep Iraq out of the hands of ISIS, as well as air support from American drones in order to eliminate dangerous jihadist elements in the country, which was refused by the United States, as "administration spokesmen have insisted that the United States is not actively considering using warplanes or armed drones to strike [jihadist havens]."

The announcement of al-Maliki's resignation on 14 August 2014 and the leadership transition to Haider al-Abadi caused a major realignment of Sunni Arab public opinion away from armed opposition groups and to the Iraqi government, since many Iraqi Sunni Arabs were optimistic that the new government would address their grievances and deliver more public goods and services to them than the government led by al-Maliki.

=== Relationship with the United States ===
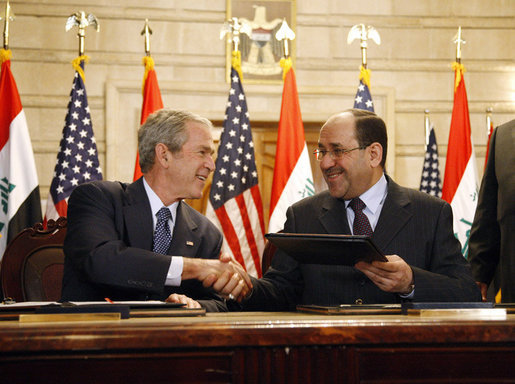
U.S. President George W. Bush and al-Maliki shake hands during a press conference.

In an interview published by the German magazine Der Spiegel in June 2008, al-Maliki said that a schedule for a withdrawal of U.S. troops from the country of "about 16 months ... would be the right time-frame for a withdrawal, with the possibility of slight changes". In the interview, he said the U.S. government has been reluctant to agree to a timetable "because they feel it would appear tantamount to an admission of defeat. But that isn't the case at all ... it is not evidence of a defeat, but of a victory, of a severe blow we have inflicted on Al Qaeda and the militias." He said U.S. negotiators were coming around to his point of view.

Hillary Clinton and Carl Levin were two of several U.S. politicians who called for him to be removed from office in 2007. Senator Clinton urged Iraq's parliament to select a "less divisive and more unifying figure" and implied she felt al-Maliki was too concerned about Iraq's Shiite majority and not enough with national reconciliation. "During his trip to Iraq last week, Senator Levin ... confirmed that the Iraqi government is nonfunctional and cannot produce a political settlement because it is too beholden to religious and sectarian leaders", she said.

Al-Maliki said the Democratic senators were acting as if Iraq were "their property" and that they should "come to their senses" and "respect democracy". After 17 Iraqis were shot and killed by Blackwater USA security guards al-Maliki called on the U.S. embassy to stop working with the company and said: "What happened was a crime. It has left a deep grudge and anger, both inside the government and among the Iraqi people."

Maliki's friendly gestures towards Iran have sometimes created tension between his government and the United States but he has also been willing to consider steps opposed by Tehran, particularly while carrying out negotiations with the United States on a joint-security pact. A June 2008 news report noted that al-Maliki's visit to Tehran seemed to be "aimed at getting Iran to tone down its opposition and ease criticism within Iraq". Al-Maliki said an agreement reached with the U.S. won't preclude good relations with neighbors like Iran.

In August 2007, CNN reported that the firm of Barbour, Griffith & Rogers had "begun a public campaign to undermine the government of Iraqi Prime Minister Nuri al-Maliki". The network described BGR as a "powerhouse Republican lobbying firm with close ties to the White House". CNN also mentioned that Ayad Allawi is both al-Maliki's rival and BGR's client, although it did not assert that Allawi had hired BGR to undermine al-Maliki.

In late 2014, Vice President Al-Maliki accused the United States of using ISIL as a pretext to maintain its military presence in Iraq. He stated that "the Americans began this sedition in Syria and then expanded its dimensions into Iraq and it seems that they intend to further stretch this problem to other countries in their future plans."

=== Official visits ===
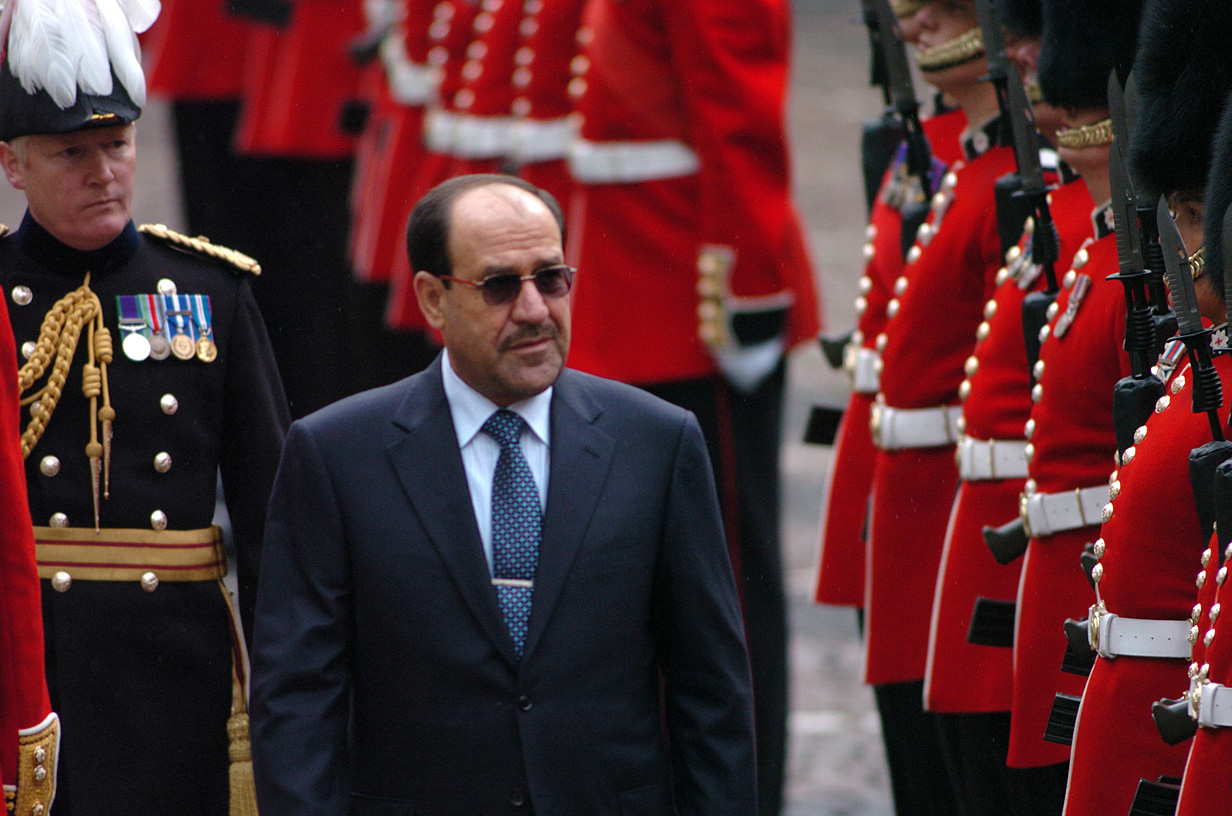
Nouri al-Maliki, inspecting a Guard of Honour formed by No 7 Company Coldstream Guards at the FCO, 30 April 2009.

On 13 June 2006, U.S. President George W. Bush paid a visit to Baghdad to meet with al-Maliki and President of Iraq Jalal Talabani, as a token of support for the new government. During this visit, they announced the Iraqi Leaders Initiative, in which students from Iraq would go to the United States to build a personal connection between the two countries. On 25 June, al-Maliki presented a national reconciliation plan to the Iraqi parliament. The peace plan sets out to remove powerful militias from the streets, open a dialogue with rebels, and review the status of purged members of the once dominant Ba'ath party. Some viewed this as a bold step towards rebuilding Iraq and reaching out to Sunnis.

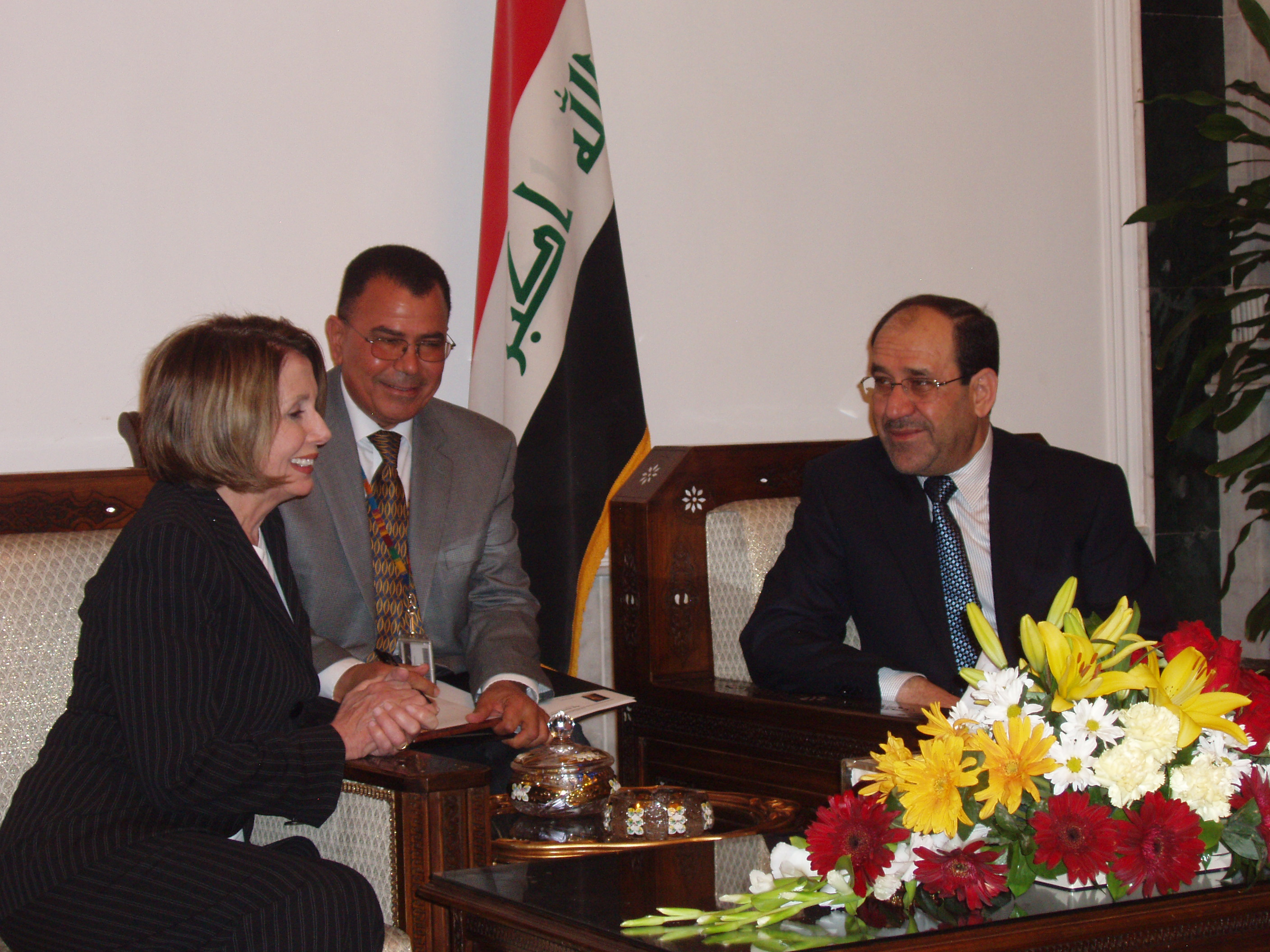
Nouri al-Maliki with Speaker Pelosi in Baghdad 2009

By July 2006, when al-Maliki visited the United States, violence had continued and even escalated, leading many to conclude that the reconciliation plan was not working or was moving too slowly. On 26 July 2006, al-Maliki addressed a joint meeting of the U.S. Congress. Several New York Democrats boycotted the speech after Al-Maliki condemned Israel's attack on Lebanon. Howard Dean, the DNC chairman, accused Al-Maliki of being an "anti-Semite" and said the United States shouldn't spend so much on Iraq and then hand it over to people like al-Maliki.

In September 2006, Al-Maliki made his first official visit to neighbouring Iran, whose alleged influence on Iraq is a matter of concern for Washington, D.C. He discussed with Iranian officials, including president Mahmoud Ahmadinejad, the "principle of no interference in internal affairs" during his visit on 11 and 12 September 2006, i.e., political and security issues. His visit closely followed an incident in which Iran detained Iraqi soldiers it accused of having illegally crossed the border.

Ibrahim Shaker, Iraqi defence ministry spokesman, said the five soldiers, one officer and one translator involved had simply been doing "their duty". During his visit al-Maliki called the Islamic Republic of Iran "a good friend and brother". A press conference given by al-Maliki and U.S. President George Bush on 14 December 2008, was disrupted when Iraqi journalist Muntadhar al-Zaidi threw his shoes at Bush.

== Later duties ==
On 26 January 2013 al-Maliki's opponents passed a law which prohibited al-Maliki from running for a third term but an Iraqi court later rejected it. By August 2014, al-Maliki lost all his chances to win a third term in office.

On 8 September 2014, during approval of the new government led by Haider al-Abadi, al-Maliki was named one of the three vice presidents, a prestigious albeit largely ceremonial post. On 11 August 2015, the Parliament approved a reform package by Prime Minister al-Abadi that foresaw, among other measures, the elimination of the three vice president posts. However, following a lawsuit opened by fellow Vice President Usama al-Nujayfi, al-Maliki declared in September 2015 that he was still holding his office because the removal of the post was not in line with the Iraqi Constitution. Osama al-Nujaifi filed a complaint against the decision in November 2015, considering it to be against the Constitution. On 10 October 2016, the three posts of Vice Presidents were restored by the Supreme Court of Iraq which termed their abolition as unconstitutional.

In January 2026, following the 2025 Iraqi parliamentary election, he was nominated as the sole candidate for Iraqi premiership by the Coordination Framework. United States President Donald Trump stated that the United States would end its support for Iraq if al-Maliki is elected. Al-Maliki rejected Trump's comments, describing them as "blatant American interference in Iraq's internal affairs", and a "violation of its (Iraq's) sovereignty." In March, the Coordination Framework reportedly withdrew his nomination.

== Controversies ==
During al-Maliki's first term, 2006–2010, his anti-Sunni policies brought about the ethnic cleansing of Sunnis; when al-Maliki insisted on disarming Sunni groups before Shia militias, and armed Shiites entered neighborhoods where Sunnis had been disarmed. In Baghdad, the Sunni population greatly decreased from 45% in 2003 to 25% in 2007.

During his second term, 2011–2014, al-Maliki's policies allowed the Shia militias to rise in power, despite the prohibition against the existence of non-state militias under article 9(b) of the Iraqi constitution. Executive orders issued by al-Maliki provided the militias with government support and allowed them to bear arms, eventually forming the Popular Mobilization Forces as a new branch of the Iraqi military. al-Maliki is blamed for the sectarian tensions that resulted in the welcoming of ISIS by the Sunni population in Iraq, and for the corruption and mismanagement that resulted in the weakening of the Iraqi military, making it unable to fight ISIS on the battlefield. al-Maliki is seen as responsible for the fall of three provinces into the hands of ISIS, and the resulting 40,000 Iraqi deaths.

In 2011, after American forces left Iraq, al-Maliki reportedly allied himself with Iran, charging the Sunni vice president with fraudulent allegations of terrorism, initiating a "political Jihad" against the Sunni finance minister of Iraq, freeing a Hezbollah terrorist from prison despite objections from the US, and opening Iraq to Iranian supply chains in support of the Assad regime. Early that year, protests against the government were violently suppressed by Iraqi security forces loyal to al-Maliki. During demonstrations on February 25, among the largest in the Arab world at the time, 29 people were shot dead by security forces in a number of cities, among them Baghdad, Fallujah, Mosul and Tikrit. In March, the offices of the Kurdish ICP and Iraqi Nation Party had been seized by authorities. Despite widespread participation, Al-Maliki blamed the protests on conspiracies and foreign elements, as well as “enemies of the political process, the armed terrorist groups and the remnants of the former regime” within Iraq. The incidents were seen as part of a continuous crackdown against government opposition in Iraq.

In 2012, al-Maliki equipped the Shiite-based militia Asa’ib Ahl al-Haq with bullet proof vehicles, released all their prisoners detained by US forces, and allowed them to conduct an anti-American parade celebrating the withdrawal of US forces. This act was seen as the initiation of a political alliance between al-Maliki and Asa’ib Ahl al-Haq.

In 2013, Sunni protesters in the demonstrations of Falluja and Hawija were declared terrorists by al-Maliki, later suppressing them violently with the military.

=== Corruption and theft ===
According to a spokesman of The Iraqi Commission of Integrity (CoI) Adil Nouri, during al-Maliki's 8-year term between 2006 and 2014, half of the funds meant for the reconstruction of Iraq, and an identical portion of the country's oil revenue were "stolen" and “vanished" from government coffers, amounting to approximately 500 billion dollars. Another study reported that the funds lost through secret deals and smuggling may amount to one trillion dollars. al-Maliki's government has been accused of fabricating crises and terrorism threats to conceal its corruption, leaving Haider al-Abadi, al-Maliki's successor a nearly empty treasury.

== Personal life ==
Al-Maliki is married to Faleeha Khalil, with whom he has four daughters and one son. His son Ahmed was head of Al-Maliki's security, and two of his sons-in-law also worked in his office.

On 26 April 2006, al-Maliki stopped using the pseudonym Jawad which he had used since moving to Syria in the early 1980s. However, the kunya "Abu Esraa" (father of Esraa – his eldest daughter) is still occasionally heard on Iraqi media, because it is very common in Arab culture (and in Iraqi culture in particular) to call someone by his eldest child's name, especially among his close friends and followers.

== See also ==
- Al-Malik or Bani Malik
- Iraq
- Islamic Dawa Party

Political offices
Preceded by Ibrahim al-Jaafari	Prime Minister of Iraq; 2006–2014	Succeeded by Haider al-Abadi
Preceded by Khodair al-Khozaei	Vice President of Iraq; 2014–2015; 2016–2018	Succeeded by Vacant
Party political offices
Preceded by Ibrahim al-Jaafari	Leader of the Islamic Dawa Party; 2007–present	Incumbent
