= Elections in Iraq =

Under the Iraqi constitution of 1925, Iraq was a constitutional monarchy, with a bicameral legislature consisting of an elected House of Representatives and an appointed Senate. The lower house was elected every four years by manhood suffrage (women did not vote). The first Parliament met in 1925. Ten general elections were held before the overthrow of the monarchy in 1958.

Between 1958 and 2003 Iraq was ruled by multiple dictatorships, socialist, Arabist then Ba'athist under the regime of Ahmed Hassan Al Bakr, who came to power in 1968, then Saddam Hussein in 1979. On 16 October 2002, after a well-publicized show election, Iraqi officials declared that Saddam had been re-elected to another seven-year term as president by a 100% unanimous vote of all 11,445,638 eligible Iraqis, eclipsing the 99.96% received in 1995. Foreign governments dismissed the vote as lacking credibility.

== Latest results ==
Party	Votes	%	Seats
Reconstruction and Development Coalition	1,318,687	11.74	46
Kurdistan Democratic Party	1,101,357	9.81	26
Progress Party	939,810	8.37	27
State of Law Coalition	728,446	6.49	29
Al-Sadiqoun Bloc	686,902	6.12	27
Badr Organization	556,850	4.96	18
Patriotic Union of Kurdistan	548,928	4.89	15
Alliance of Nation State Forces	513,715	4.57	18
Azem Alliance	483,737	4.31	15
National Sovereignty Alliance	316,415	2.82	9
Iraqi Fundamental Coalition	291,128	2.59	8
Rights Movement	231,013	2.06	6
National Determination Alliance	226,469	2.02	5
Good News, Iraq	211,276	1.88	4
Ishraqat Kanoon	199,335	1.78	8
Services Alliance	190,707	1.70	5
Tasmim Alliance	173,761	1.55	6
Kurdistan Islamic Union	166,954	1.49	4
National Stance Movement	156,995	1.40	5
New Generation Movement	139,247	1.24	3
Al-Anbar Is Our Identity Alliance	128,325	1.14	3
Nineveh for Its People	111,125	0.99	3
Wasit Ajmal Alliance	106,152	0.95	4
National Party of the Masses	104,749	0.93	3
Qimam Coalition	97,635	0.87	3
Tafawq Alliance	84,326	0.75	2
Alternative Alliance	71,697	0.64	0
Sumerian Movement	66,468	0.59	2
Unified Iraqi Turkmen Front	66,179	0.59	2
Al-Faw Zakho Coalition	64,263	0.57	1
Saladin Unified Alliance	57,150	0.51	1
Nineveh's People Union	56,420	0.50	2
Arab Project	54,573	0.49	1
Diyala First Coalition	53,469	0.48	1
Arab Alliance of Kirkuk	53,046	0.47	1
Saladin Partnership Alliance	50,980	0.45	1
National Identity	50,200	0.45	1
Kurdistan Justice Group	49,756	0.44	1
Yazidi Cause Alliance	49,211	0.44	1
Our Hawks	41,434	0.37	0
Kirkuk Turkmen Salvation Alliance	32,751	0.29	0
National Depth Alliance	31,829	0.28	0
Thabitun	30,449	0.27	1
Nineveh First Alliance	29,381	0.26	0
Idraak Movement	28,491	0.25	1
State Support Bloc	21,615	0.19	1
People's Front	21,008	0.19	0
Qadimun	20,193	0.18	0
National Hadbaa Alliance	18,383	0.16	0
The Youth Machine	14,915	0.13	0
Civil Party	12,974	0.12	0
Civil Democratic Alliance	9,069	0.08	0
Leadership Alliance	8,226	0.07	0
National Pioneers Movement	7,389	0.07	0
Kurdistan Social Democratic Party	7,100	0.06	0
Sharqat Alliance	6,941	0.06	0
Diwaniyah Flame	5,612	0.05	0
Iraqi Altruism Party	5,505	0.05	0
Al-Umran Party	4,261	0.04	0
National Tribal Movement in Iraq	4,112	0.04	0
Iraq Reform Party	4,056	0.04	0
Rescuers	3,978	0.04	0
Iraqi Turkmen Front	2,395	0.02	0
National Brigade Party	1,774	0.02	0
Al-Daae Party	1,731	0.02	0
National Spread Party	1,603	0.01	0
Our Cause Movement	1,324	0.01	0
Fayli Front	1,159	0.01	0
National Al-Refah Party	234	0.00	0
Independents	22,495	0.20	0
Christian minority candidates	154,227	1.37	5
Feyli minority candidates	39,055	0.35	1
Yazidi minority candidates	32,169	0.29	1
Mandaean minority candidates	27,457	0.24	1
Shabak minority candidates	17,158	0.15	1
Total	11,229,909	100.00	329
Valid votes	11,267,161	93.92	
Invalid/blank votes	729,923	6.08	
Total votes	11,997,084	100.00	
Registered voters/turnout	21,406,882	56.04	
Source: IHEC, IHEC

== Parliamentary elections ==
=== January 2005 Iraqi parliamentary election ===
The multinational force's 2003 invasion of Iraq overthrew Saddam's government and installed an interim administration.

An initial Iraqi attempt at holding local elections was canceled by Paul Bremer.

This government held elections on 30 January 2005 to begin the process of writing a constitution. International groups and the formerly excluded factions claimed that the January 2005 elections were the first free elections in Iraq's history, with a fair representation of all groups. This is in stark contrast to previous elections, such as the 16 October 2002 referendum on the extension of his role as president, when Saddam Hussein claimed that 100% of the voters voted "yes" and that 100% of Iraqi's had voted (approximately 24,001,820 people). Opponents of the occupation, such as the various insurgent groups, claimed the elections were not free and fair, citing flaws in the process. The UN adviser to Iraq's election commission Craig Jenness said the complaints were not significant; "I don't see anything that would necessitate a rerun.... There were nearly 7,000 candidates standing in this election and only 275 seats, so you're always going to have winners and losers and it's normal that the losers won't always be happy about it."

=== 2009 request for national elections ===
The issue arising was the interpretation of Article 56 of the constitution which states:

First: The electoral term of the Council of Representatives shall be four calendar years, starting with its first session and ending with the conclusion of the fourth year.

Second: The new Council of Representatives shall be elected forty-five days before the conclusion of the preceding electoral term. The previous election had been on 15 December 2005.

The opening session of the Council of Representatives had been 16 March 2006 (the swearing in session) and the first substantive session of the Council of Representatives was then held on 22 April 2006. The Court was of the opinion that the swearing in session on 16 March 2006 was the "first session" as required by Article 56(First). It therefore followed that the conclusion of the fourth year would be on 15 March 2010 and that the election should be 45 days prior to 15 March 2010, i.e., 30 January 2010. The court decided that the calendar year referred to was the 365-day Gregorian year (and not for example the 360-day Hijri year).

=== 2010 Iraqi parliamentary election ===
Party	Votes	%	Seats	+/–
Iraqi National Movement	2,849,612	24.72	91	+54
State of Law Coalition	2,792,083	24.22	89	+64
National Iraqi Alliance	2,092,066	18.15	70	–35
Kurdistan List	1,681,714	14.59	43	–10
Movement for Change	476,478	4.13	8	+8
Iraqi Accord Front	298,226	2.59	6	–38
Unity Alliance of Iraq	306,647	2.66	4	+4
Kurdistan Islamic Union	243,720	2.11	4	–1
Islamic Group of Kurdistan	152,530	1.32	2	+1
Reserved seats for ethnic minorities	61,153	0.53	8	+6
Others	572,183	4.96	–	–
Total	11,526,412	100.00	325	+50
Registered voters/turnout	18,902,073	–		
Source: Psephos

=== 2025 Iraqi parliamentary election ===
On 17 November 2025, the Iraqi Independent High Electoral Commission announced that the Reconstruction and Development coalition, led by Prime Minister Mohammed Shia al-Sudani, topped the final results with 46 seats in the 329-member Council of Representatives, followed by the Progress (Taqaddum) party of former Parliament Speaker Mohammed al-Halbousi with 36 seats, and the State of Law coalition of former Prime Minister Nouri al-Maliki with 29 seats. Subsequently, the Shia-led Coordination Framework declared that it had constituted itself as the largest parliamentary bloc by uniting its component parties, thereby positioning itself as a central force in government formation and parliamentary negotiations.

== Presidential elections ==
=== 2014 Iraqi presidential election ===
Candidate	Party	First round		Second round	
Candidate	Party	Votes	%	Votes	%
Fuad Masum	Patriotic Union of Kurdistan	175	76.42	221	92.86
Hussein Al-Moussawi	Independent	3	1.31	17	7.14
Hanan al-Fatlawi	State of Law Coalition	37	16.16		
Faiq Al Sheikh Ali	Civil Democratic Alliance	10	4.37		
Hameed Hammadi		2	0.87		
Hussein Al-Lami		1	0.44		
Thaer Ghanem		1	0.44		
Total		229	100.00	238	100.00
Valid votes		229	83.27	238	85.30
Invalid/blank votes		46	16.73	41	14.70
Total votes		275	100.00	279	100.00
Registered voters/turnout		328	83.84	328	85.06
Source: Iraqi Parliament

=== 2018 Iraqi presidential election ===
Candidate	Party	First round		Second round	
Candidate	Party	Votes	%	Votes	%
Barham Salih	Patriotic Union of Kurdistan	165	58.72	219	90.87
Fuad Hussein	Kurdistan Democratic Party	89	31.67	22	9.13
Sarwa Abdel Wahid	Independent	18	6.41		
Abbas Mohammed Nouri		4	1.42		
Nawar Saad Al-Mulla		2	0.71		
Munqith Abdul Latif Al-Saffa		2	0.71		
Thaer Ghanem		1	0.36		
Total		281	100.00	241	100.00
Valid votes		281	93.05	241	88.60
Invalid votes		13	4.30	24	8.82
Blank votes		8	2.65	7	2.57
Total votes		302	100.00	272	100.00
Registered voters/turnout		329	91.79	329	82.67
Source: Parliament of Iraq

=== 2022 Iraqi presidential election ===
Results
Candidates	Parties	First round		Second round	
Candidates	Parties	Votes	%	Votes	%
Abdul Latif Rashid	PUK	157	61.33	162	62.07
Barham Salih	PUK	99	38.67	99	37.93
Required majority (Note: In the first round, a two-thirds majority of those registered is required, not a majority of the votes cast. In the second round, the election only requires obtaining the greatest number of votes between the two remaining candidates, i.e. the absolute majority of the votes cast.)		220 votes		50% of votes	
Valid votes		256	92.42	261	97.03
Blank and invalid votes		21	7.58	8	2.97
Total		277	100	269	100
Abstention		52	15.81	60	18.24
Registered voters / turnout		329	84.19	329	81.76

=== 2026 Iraqi presidential election ===
Results
Canditates	Parties	First round		Second round	
Canditates	Parties	Votes	%	Votes	%
Nizar Amidi	PUK	208	82.54	227	90.08
Muthanna Amin	KIU	17	6.75	15	5.95
Fuad Hussein	KDP	16	6.35	Eliminated	
Abdullah Al-Ulawi	Independent	2	0.79	Eliminated	
Required majority (Note: In the first round, a two-thirds majority of those registered is required, not a majority of the votes cast. In the second round, the election only requires obtaining the greatest number of votes between the two remaining candidates, i.e. the absolute majority of the votes cast.)		220 votes		50% of votes	
Valid votes		243	96.43	242	96.03
Blank and invalid votes		9	3.57	10	3.97
Total		252	100	252	100
Abstention		33	23.40	33	23.40
Registered voters / turnout		329	76.60	329	76.60

== Local governorate elections ==
=== 2005 Iraqi governorate elections ===
Party	Total seats	Party leader
Supreme Council for Islamic Revolution in Iraq	195	Abdel Aziz al-Hakim
Kurdistan Democratic Party	91	Massoud Barzani
Patriotic Union of Kurdistan	80	Jalal Talabani
Sadr Movement	60	Muqtada al-Sadr
al-Fadhila Islamic Party	49	Abdelrahim Al-Husseini
Iraqi Islamic Party	45	Tariq al-Hashemi
Islamic Da'awa Party	42	Ibrahim al-Jaafari
Iraqi National Accord	18	Iyad Allawi
Kurdistan Islamic Union	10	Salaheddine Bahaaeddin
Reconciliation and Liberation Bloc	10	Misha'an al-Juburi
Iraqi Communist Party	8	Hamid Majid Mousa
Iraqi Republican Group	7	
Other Parties	133	-
Total	748	-

=== 2009 Iraqi governorate elections ===
Party	Total votes	Percentage	Total seats	Party leader
State of Law Coalition	1,362,594	19.1%	126	Nouri al-Maliki
al-Mehraab Martyr List	482,800	6.8%	52	Abdul Aziz al-Hakim
Independent Free Movement	434,849	6.1%	43	Muqtada al-Sadr
Iraqi Accord Front	449,575	6.3%	32	Tariq al-Hashemi
Iraqi National List	404,201	5.7%	26	Ayad Allawi
National Reform Trend	273,130	3.8%	23	Ibrahim al-Jaafari
Brotherhood List	353,328	5.0%	20	Barzani, Talabani
National Iraqi Project Gathering	328,250	4.6%	19	Saleh al-Mutlaq
Al-Hadbaa National List	435,595	6.1%	19	Atheel al-Nujaifi
Awakening Council	56,262	0.8%	8	Abu Risha
Islamic Virtue Party	140,648	2.0%	6	Abdul al-Huseini
Other Parties	2,422,424	33.7%	66	-
Total	7,143,656	100%	440	-

Provincial turnout

Governorate	Votes cast	Seats
Anbar	317,074	29
Babil	487,858	30
Baghdad	1,694,930	57
Basra	646,109	35
Dhi Qar	453,806	31
Diyala	430,407	29
Karbala	291,479	27
Maysan	234,398	27
Muthanna	207,752	26
Najaf	338,540	28
Nineveh	995,169	37
Qadisiyyah	332,176	28
Saladin	403,764	28
Wasit	310,194	28
Total:	7,143,656	440

=== 2013 Iraqi governorate elections ===
Party	Total votes	Percentage	Total seats	Party leader
State of Law Coalition	1,890,567	26.21%	102	Nouri al-Maliki
Citizens Alliance	943,646	13.08%	66	Ammar al-Hakim
Liberal Coalition	653,763	9.06%	60	Muqtada al-Sadr
Muttahidoon	518,968	7.19%	35	Atheel al-Nujaifi
Arabian Al Iraqia			18	Saleh al-Mutlaq
Kurdistan List	255,362	3.54%	17	Barham Salih
Al Iraqia National and United Coalition	298,198	4.13%	16	Ayad Allawi
Civil Democratic Alliance			11	Ali Khathem Aziz
Loyalty to Najaf	118,310	1.64%	9	Adnan al-Zurufi
Islamic Dawa Party – Iraq Organisation			7	Hashim Al-Mosawy
Iraqi People's Coalition			8	
Hope of Rafidain			3	
Iraq's Benevolence and Generosity List	65,634	0.91%	3	Dr Rushdi Said
National White Bloc	44,765	0.62%	2	Hassan Alawi
Other Parties			99	-
Total	7,214,146	100%	447	-
Source: ISW, Gulf Analysis, IHEC, Musings on Iraq

==== 2013 elections statistics ====
- Overall turnout: 51% (Similar to turnout in 2009 Elections)
- Number of registered eligible voters: Approx. 13,800,000 (Including 14,000 prisoners, 55,000 hospital patients and 53,000 displaced Iraqis eligible to vote).
- Number of voters turned out: 6,400,777 voters
- Elections are held: 12 provinces (out of 18 provinces).
  - Four provinces are part of the semi-autonomous region Kurdistan with their Elections in September 2013, two provinces (Anbar, Nineveh) requested to postpone their elections due to security reasons.
- No. of seats contested: 378 seats in Province Councils (Local Government).
- Number of candidates: 8138
- Female candidates: 2205
- Male candidates: 5933

This is the sixth voting exercise by Iraqis in 10 years:

- 2004 National Assembly Elections
- 2005 Constitution Referendum
- 2005 Parliamentary Elections
- 2009 Provincial Councils
- 2010 Parliamentary elections
- 2013 Provincial Council (Saturday 20 April)
- Number of parties and alliances competing: 256 parties and 50 political alliances
- International independent observers (non-Iraqi): 350
- Local independent observers: 6,000
- Political parties’ observers (political entity representatives): 267,388
- Polling stations: 5,370 (5,178)¹
- Ballot boxes: 32,445 (32,201)² election ballot box
  - Including polling stations in prisons and hospitals.
- Polling stations opening time: 07:00 to 17:00 (Baghdad Time)
- IHEC Help Centre Freephone: 2800 calls received from voters.
- Local Help Centres set up by IHEC: 12 (one in each province).
- IHEC staff (including reserve staff): 180,000
  - 100% of staff in this election were Iraqis
- Local journalists and media: 2,256
- International journalists: 187

==== Basra ====
Summary of the 20 April 2013 Basra governorate election results
Party/Coalition	Allied national parties	Leader	Seats	Change	Votes	%	±%
State of Law Coalition	Islamic Dawa Party	Nouri Al-Maliki	16	▼4	292,658	45.17%	▲8.18%
Citizens Alliance	ISCI	Ammar al-Hakim	6	▲1	121,875	18.81%	▲7.22%
Liberal Coalition	Liberal Bloc; Tribal Forces Coalition; Sadrist Movement	Dhia Najim al-Asadi	3	▲1	58,312	9.00%	▲4.04%
Basra Independent Coalition	Kafaat al-Iraq; National Fidelity; Loyalty to Najaf; ICICSO		2	▲2	29,384	4.54%	▲4.54%
Gathering of Justice and Unity		al-Faiz	1	▼1	24,513	3.78%	▼0.38%
Al Barsa’s Civil Alliance	Movement for Justice & Development; Democratic Movement; Labour & National Salvation Coalition; People's Party (Iraq); National Meeting; NDP; Iraqi Communist Party	Faiq Al Sheikh Ali	1	▲1	17,541	2.71%	
Alternative Movement			1	▲1	15,643	2.41%	
Islamic Dawa Party – Iraq Organisation			1	▲1	15,493	2.39%	
Will of Iraq Movement			1	▲1	13,940	2.15%	
Al Iraqia National and United Coalition			1	▲1	13,319	2.06%	
Muttahidoon			1	▲1	10,386	1.60%	
National White Bloc					8,247	1.27%	▲1.27%
Al Basra’s People					8,246	1.27%	
New Dawn Bloc					4,115	0.64%	
Iraqi Council for Reform and Change					3,536	0.55%	
Iraq’s Benevolence and Generosity List					2,568	0.40%	
Iraq’s Advocates for State Support					1,782	0.28%	
Islamic Advocates' Party					1,671	0.26%	
Novac Aram Butrosian Abu Mariana	Independent				1,165	0.18%	
Alaa’ Fawzi Kamel Tutunji	Independent				812	0.13%	
Doctor Saad Mitri Botros	Independent				643	0.10%	
Mohammad Al Maryani	Independent				592	0.09%	
Chaldean Syriac Assyrian Popular Council					588	0.09%	
Legal Advisor Sanaa’ Al Asadi	Independent				565	0.09%	
Na’el Ghanem Aziz Hanna	Independent				343	0.05%	
Total			35	-	647,937	100%	
Sources: Musings on Iraq, ISW, IHEC Basra Results, List of political coalition approved for election in provincial councils - IHEC Archived 2015-05-28 at the Wayback Machine, al-Sumaria - Basra Coalitions

In Basrah the numbers were as follows: Voter turnout: 42%

Registered eligible voters: Approx. 1,600,000

Ballots cast: Approx. 650,000

Candidates: 656

Contested seats: 35 Council seats (1 seat reserved for Christian quota)

Political entities: 25 (party and alliance)

In the first elections since the withdrawal of U.S. forces, the Iraqi Independent Electoral Commission (IHEC) confirmed that 6,400,777 voters cast their votes.

=== 2023 Iraqi governorate elections ===
Party	Total votes	Percentage	Total seats	Party leader
State of Law Coalition	1,890,567	26.21%	102	Nouri al-Maliki
Citizens Alliance	943,646	13.08%	66	Ammar al-Hakim
Liberal Coalition	653,763	9.06%	60	Muqtada al-Sadr
Muttahidoon	518,968	7.19%	35	Atheel al-Nujaifi
Arabian Al Iraqia			18	Saleh al-Mutlaq
Kurdistan List	255,362	3.54%	17	Barham Salih
Al Iraqia National and United Coalition	298,198	4.13%	16	Ayad Allawi
Civil Democratic Alliance			11	Ali Khathem Aziz
Loyalty to Najaf	118,310	1.64%	9	Adnan al-Zurufi
Islamic Dawa Party – Iraq Organisation			7	Hashim Al-Mosawy
Iraqi People's Coalition			8	
Hope of Rafidain			3	
Iraq's Benevolence and Generosity List	65,634	0.91%	3	Dr Rushdi Said
National White Bloc	44,765	0.62%	2	Hassan Alawi
Other Parties			99	-
Total	7,214,146	100%	447	-
Source: ISW, Gulf Analysis, IHEC, Musings on Iraq

== See also ==
- Assyrian elections in Iraq
- History of Iraq
- Electoral calendar
- Electoral system
- 2010 Iraqi Status of Forces Agreement referendum
- Legislative Council of the Autonomous Kurdistan Region
