= Council of Ministers (Iraq) =

Executive authority in Iraq

- Arabic: مجلس الوزراء; Kurdish: ئەنجومەنی وەزیران

Overview
- Established: 28 December 2005
- State: Republic of Iraq
- Leader: Prime Minister of Iraq
- Appointed by: Prime Minister of Iraq
- Ministries: 26
- Responsible to: Council of Representatives
- Headquarters: Baghdad, Iraq
- Website: cabinet.iq

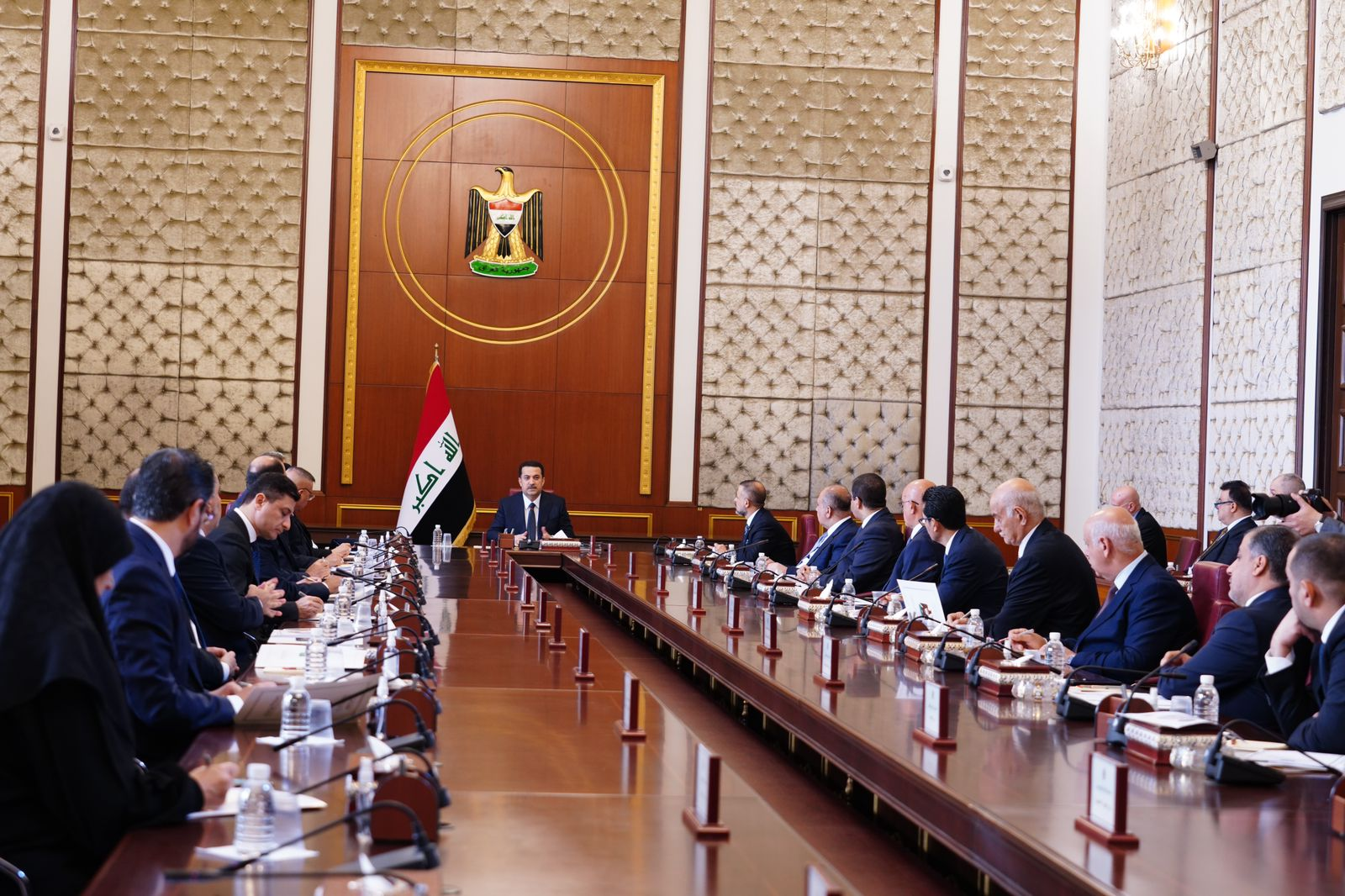
The Council of Ministers headed by Mohammed Shia' Al Sudani holds its first session on October 28, 2022

The Council of Ministers is the principal executive organ of the federal government of the Republic of Iraq.

The Council of Representatives of Iraq elects a President of the Republic who appoints the Prime Minister who in turn appoints the Council of Ministers, all of whom must be approved by the Assembly.

== Current composition ==
| Office | Name | Party | In office since |
|---|---|---|---|
| Prime Minister | Ali al-Zaidi | Independent | 14 May 2026 |
| Interior Minister | Yassir al-Maliki | State of Law Coalition | 15 October 2026 |
| Finance Minister | Falih al-Sari | National Wisdom Movement | 14 May 2026 |
| Foreign Affairs Minister | Fuad Hussein | Kurdistan Democratic Party | 14 May 2026 |
| Defense Minister | Nayif al-Shammari | National Resolve Alliance | 15 October 2026 |
| Oil Minister | Bassim al-Abadi | Reconstruction and Development Coalition | 14 May 2026 |
| Agriculture Minister | Abdul-Rahim al-Shammari | Reconstruction and Development Coalition | 14 May 2026 |
| Communications Minister | Mustafa Sanad | Justice and Unity Party | 14 May 2026 |
| Construction, Housing, Municipalities, and Public Works Minister | Ribaz Muhammad Hamlan | Kurdistan Democratic Party | 15 October 2026 |
| Culture Minister | Yassin al-Ithawi | Azem Alliance | 15 October 2026 |
| Digital Economy and Governance Minister | Muhammad al-Darraji | Khadamat Alliance | 15 October 2026 |
| Education Minister | Abdul-Karim al-Jubouri | Takadum | 14 May 2026 |
| Electricity Minister | Ali Sa'di Whaib | Reconstruction and Development Coalition | 14 May 2026 |
| Environment Minister | Sarwa Abdulwahid | New Generation Movement | 14 May 2026 |
| Health Minister | Abdul-Hussein al-Mousawi | National Contract Party | 14 May 2026 |
| Higher Education and Scientific Research Minister | Haydar al-Hasani | State of Law Coalition | 15 October 2026 |
| Industry and Minerals Minister | Muhammad al-Karbuli | Takadum | 14 May 2026 |
| Justice Minister | Khaled Shwani | Patriotic Union of Kurdistan | 14 May 2026 |
| Labour and Social Affairs Minister | Muhammad al-Musawi | Al-Sadiqoun Bloc | 15 October 2026 |
| Planning Minister | Qutayba Ghazi Majid | Azem Alliance | 15 October 2026 |
| Minister of State for Minority Affairs | Muhammad Samaan | Iraqi Turkmen Front | 15 October 2026 |
| Tourism and Antiquities Minister | Ali al-Dakhili | Muntasirun Bloc | 15 October 2026 |
| Migration and the Displaced Minister | Vacant | | — |
| Trade Minister | Mustafa al-Aani | Siyada Party | 14 May 2026 |
| Transport Minister | Wahab al-Hasani | Badr Organisation | 14 May 2026 |
| Water Resources Minister | Muthanna al-Tamimi | Badr Organisation | 14 May 2026 |
| Youth and Sports Minister | Safaa al-Kinani | National Wisdom Movement | 15 October 2026 |

== See also ==
- List of cabinets
