= Bnas Doski =

Iraqi Kurdish politician

- بناس دۆسکی
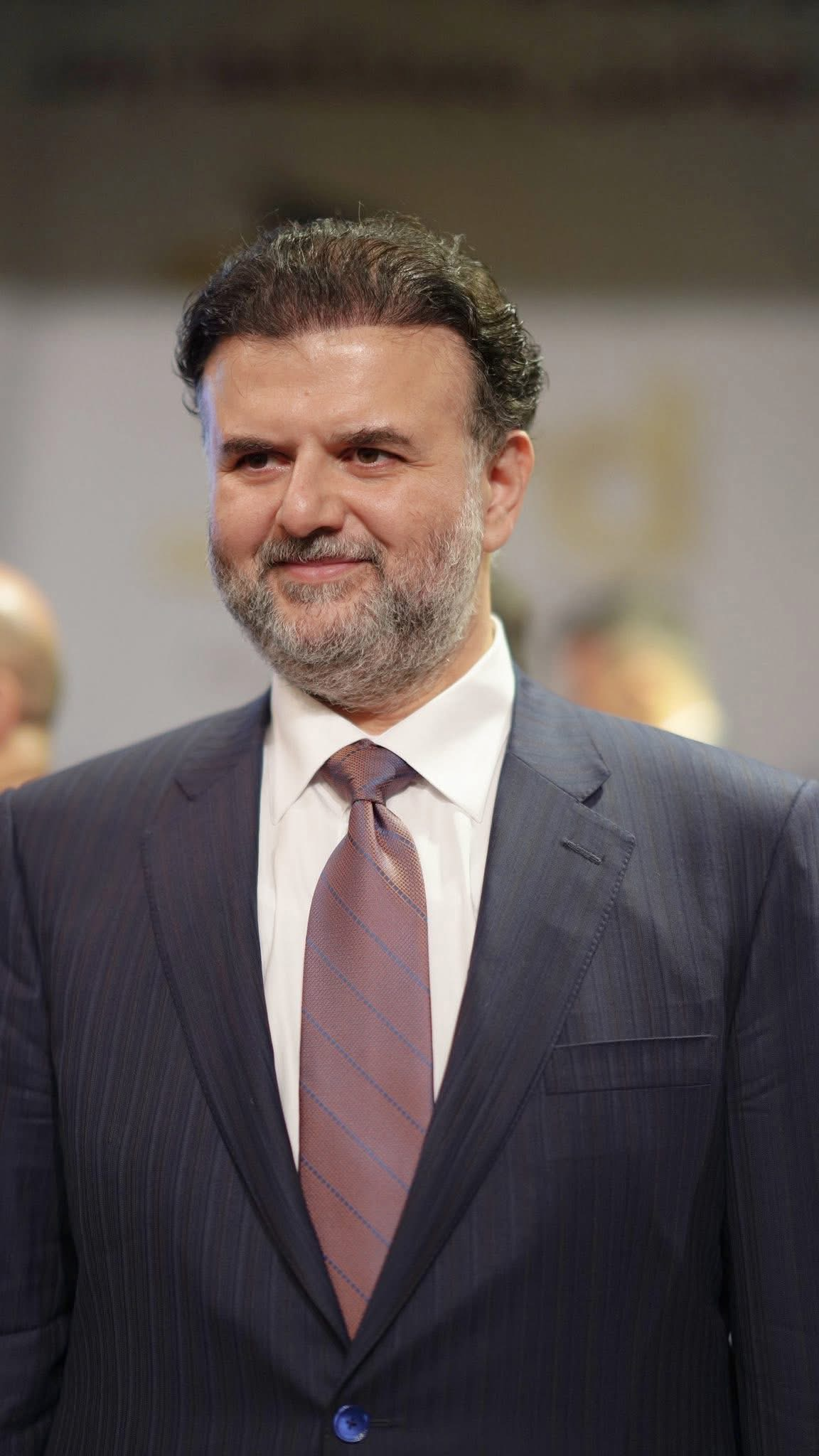
- Bnas doski in 2025

Member of the Council of Representatives
- Incumbent
- Assumed office 2025
- President: Nizar Amidi
- Prime Minister: Ali al-Zaidi
- Parliamentary group: Kurdistan Democratic Party
- Constituency: Duhok

Personal details
- Born: Bnas Ali Fariq Taher Doski
- Party: Kurdistan Democratic Party
- Occupation: Politician

Bnas Ali Doski (Sorani Kurdish: بناس عەلی دۆسکی, romanized: Bnas Elî Doskî / Arabic: بناس علي دوسکي) (Born 1980) is an Iraqi Kurdish politician who is a member of the Council of Representatives of Iraq in Duhok Governorate. Doski is also a member of the Kurdistan Democratic Party.

== Political career ==
=== 2025 Parliamentary election ===
Doski was an elected candidate for the Kurdistan Democratic Party in the 2025 Iraqi parliamentary election in Duhok Governorate. He had 50,034 votes and secured a seat in the Iraqi Council of Representatives.

In October 2025, as a part of his campaign for the 2025 Iraqi parliamentary election, Doski organized a mass wedding for 79 couples. His campaign also used social media ads.

Following his election, Doski spoke at the Dohuk Peace and Security Forum, where he called for the formation of the Iraqi government within the deadlines established by the Constitution of Iraq. He also discussed the constitutional rights of the Kurdistan Region and said that KDP members of parliament should represent Iraqis generally rather than only their party's constituency.

In February 2026, Doski called for adherence to the constitutional deadlines governing the election of the president of Iraq and the nomination of a candidate for prime minister by the largest parliamentary bloc.

== Business ==
Doski is the chairman of the Shinal company.
