= Coordination Framework =

Shia political coalition in Iraq

Coordination Framework الإطار التنسيقي
- Leader: Ali al-Zaidi; Haider al-Abadi; Mohammed Shia al-Sudani; Ammar al-Hakim; Qais al-Khazali; Humam Hamoudi; Hadi al-Amiri
- Spokesperson: Abbas Al-Amiri (secretary-general)
- Founded: March 2021
- Preceded by: National Iraqi Alliance
- Membership: Reconstruction and Development; State of Law; Asa'ib Ahl al-Haq; Alliance of Nation State Forces; Badr Organisation; Tasmim Alliance; Kata'ib Hezbollah; Islamic Supreme Council of Iraq; Kata'ib Sayyid ul-Shuhada; Services Alliance; Al-Asas Coalition
- Religion: Shia Islam
- Seats in the Council of Representatives of Iraq: 174 / 329

The Coordination Framework (Arabic: الإطار التنسيقي, romanized: al-ʾiṭār at-tansīqī) is a council of major Iraqi Shiite parties in the Council of Representatives. It was originally formed in March 2021 to contest the results of the 2021 Iraqi parliamentary election and later became a parliamentary alliance for government formation. There are currently 12 member parties in the council. The Coordination Framework chooses the country's prime minister.

== History ==
=== Formation ===
In 2021, major leaders and representatives of the Shiite parliamentary blocs met at the home of former prime minister Nouri al-Maliki, including Hadi al-Amiri, Ammar al-Hakim, Haider al-Abadi, and Nasser al-Rubaie, with then-Prime Minister Mustafa Al-Kadhimi also present. The attendees agreed to establish the "Coordination Framework" as an informal parliamentary gathering in order to coordinate among the main Shiite parties in the Council of Representatives opposed to the Sadrist Movement. The parties that agreed to this framework included the Victory Alliance, the State of Law Coalition, the National Wisdom Movement, and the Fatah Alliance.

=== Reaction to 2021 election results ===
The framework was not publicized until following the 2021 Iraqi parliamentary election, where the Sadrist Movement won 73 out of 329 seats in parliament. The framework believed that they deserved more seats than they received and contested the results, as members feared that they would lose influence in the new government. On 22 December 2021, the framework announced three negotiation committees: the first was headed by Hadi al-Amiri and tasked with negotiating with Muqtada al-Sadr; the second was headed by Nouri al-Maliki to negotiate with Masoud Barzani; and the third was headed by Qais al-Khazali to negotiate with Sunni parties in parliament, such as the Progress Party. The committees sought to negotiate a consensus government with their rival parties, but the Sadrist Movement and the Sovereignty Alliance followed the election results and relied on them to form a majority government.

After the election results were announced, the framework began expressing fear of a civil war if a consensus government was not formed. The framework also criticized Sunni Arabs by reminding them of the role of the PMF in liberating Sunni areas from ISIS in the War in Iraq. Muqtada al-Sadr later responded by stating that "The Popular Mobilization Forces have no credit for liberating the lands from ISIS; without the people of those lands, they would not have been liberated". The framework also challenged the election results by presenting a legal case at the Federal Supreme Court, but the case was rejected.

=== 2023 and 2025 elections ===
In the electoral campaigns for the 2023 Iraqi governorate elections, the framework became fragmented into four main factions as a result of internal divisions in interests. This continued into the 2025 Iraqi parliamentary election as factions disagree over competing economic interests, and also on policies towards Iran, Syria, and the Popular Mobilization Forces. In January 2026, after internal divides within the framework, sitting prime minister Mohammed Shia al-Sudani agreed to step aside and the framework nominated Nouri al-Maliki for the position. Following opposition from U.S. President Donald Trump due to al-Maliki's close ties to Iran, the latter was forced to withdraw from the race. As a result, the framework chose businessman and political outsider Ali al-Zaidi as its candidate, who became prime minister-designate of Iraq.
