= Planned Iraqi referendum on the Status of Forces Agreement =

A referendum on the Status of Forces Agreement (SOFA) between the United States and Iraq was due to be held in Iraq in 2010. Contrary to expectations, it was not held on 7 March 2010 together with parliamentary elections; it was originally due on 30 July 2009.

== Agreement ==
The Agreement was necessary as the legal authority for the presence of the United States' troops - the United Nations Security Council Resolution 1790 - expired on 31 December 2008.

Under the agreement, the United States' Army must withdraw from all cities by mid-2009 and from Iraq altogether by the end of 2011. Iraqi courts will be able to try crimes committed by off-duty soldiers outside their bases. The United States would not be allowed to use Iraq as a base to attack any other state - a response to a recent bombing of Syria - and the Iraqi Army would have control over the operations and movements of the United States' army.

The Prime Minister of Iraq, Nouri al-Maliki, said the agreement would restore "full sovereignty" to Iraq by 2011.

The draft Bill was approved by the Council of Ministers of Iraq on 16 November and sent to the Council of Representatives for approval. The agreement was initialled by Foreign Minister Hoshyar Zebari and U.S. Ambassador Ryan Crocker on 17 November.

Before the vote in the Council of Representatives of Iraq, the most senior cleric, Ali al-Sistani, said the agreement should have "broad consensus" across all political groups. Following this call, the al-Maliki government tried to persuade the Sunni Arab parties to support the agreement, despite having a sufficient majority in parliament without them.

When the bill came up for its second reading in November, many MPs left the country to go on the annual Hajj pilgrimage to Mecca. This was strongly criticised by Sistani, who said MPs should "assume their national and historical responsibility to give their opinion frankly about the agreement". When first debated the vote was shouted down by opponents from the Sadrist Movement, but it was passed the following day.

The Sunni Arab coalitions, the Iraqi Accord Front and the Iraqi National Dialogue Front were reported to be concerned that the departure of the United States' Army would allow the Shi'ite majority to dominate them. They called for the end of the prosecution of Baath party members, the abolition of the Supreme Iraqi Criminal Tribunal and that the agreement be put to a referendum the following year. In the end the Maliki government agreed to the referendum and the two groups dropped their other demands.

The small Islamic Virtue Party and the Iraqi National Dialogue Front also opposed the agreement, arguing it "infringed Iraqi sovereignty"

If the referendum result would have been against the SOFA, the Iraqi government would have given notice to end the agreement and US troops would have been required to leave Iraq within one year. "If the Iraqi people reject the pact in the referendum ... the government of Iraq will be committed, according to the law, to the result of the referendum and will convey this will to the American administration. The pact will be annulled," Iraq's Sunni Vice-president Tareq al-Hashemi said. The deal can be terminated if either signatory gives the other side a year's notice.
