= Khaled al-Obaidi =

34th Iraqi Minister of Defense

Khaled Al-Obaidi
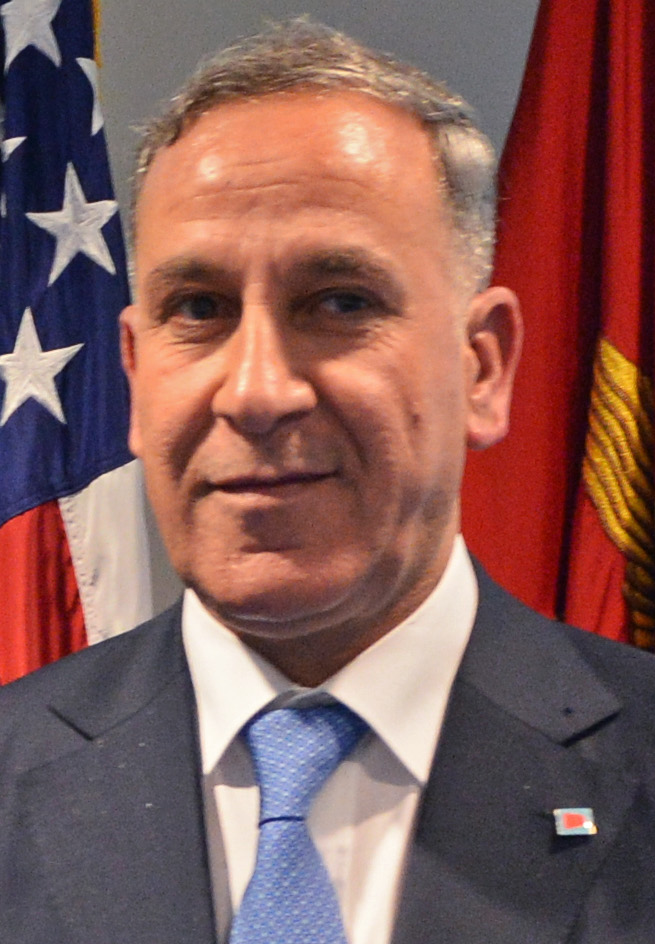
- al-Obaidi meets US Secretary of Defence, April 2015

Defense Minister of Iraq
- In office 18 October 2014 – 19 August 2016
- President: Fuad Masum
- Prime Minister: Haider al-Abadi
- Preceded by: Saadoun al-Dulaimi
- Succeeded by: Othman Ghanm (Interim)

Personal details
- Born: Mosul, Iraq
- Party: Azem Alliance
- Education: University of Baghdad, Keele University
- Profession: Politician, aerospace engineer

Military service
- Branch/service: Iraqi Air Force; Iraqi Army
- Rank: Major general

Khaled Miteb Yassin Hassan Al-Obaidi (born 1959) is an Iraqi politician and former military officer who served as Minister of Defense of Iraq from 2014 to 2016. His tenure took place during a critical period in the country’s fight against the Islamic State, particularly following the fall of Mosul in 2014.

== Background ==
Khalid Yassin al-Obaidi is a Sunni Muslim who was born in Mosul. He belongs to the al-Obaidi Sunni tribal confederation. al-Obaidi is a member of the Iraqi parliament's Itihad al-Quwa al-Wataniyah bloc. He holds two master's degree in engineering and military science as well as a doctorate in political science. He served in the Iraqi Air Force, specialising in engineering aircraft engines until 2003 when he was appointed as a university professor by the Ministry of Higher Education. He was appointed as the Technical Education Authority by the Ministry of Education in 2007 and has also served as a security advisor for the President of the Parliament. He was nominated for the post of Defense Minister and accepted by the Prime Minister Nouri Al-Maliki in 2010 but was rejected by Ayad Allawi, the Iraqi National List founder. He was also a major general in the Iraqi Army.

== Defence Minister ==
On 18 October 2014, he was appointed as the Defence Minister of Iraq. In August 2016, al-Obeidi was voted out of power through a no-confidence vote in the parliament, with a majority of lawmakers voting against him over allegations of corruption. He is the first incumbent defence minister to receive a no-confidence vote in Iraq after the invasion of Iraq in 2003. Othman al-Ghanmi was appointed to succeed him as the interim Defence Minister by the Iraqi government on 29 August 2016.

== Later career ==
In December 2017, an MP reported that an arrest warrant had been issued for al-Obaidi. Warrants were issued for 48 defence officials in total, including the air force commander.

al-Obaidi later shifted to the Azem Alliance. Prime Minister Mustafa Al-Kadhimi appointed him as the head of the operations section of the Iraqi National Intelligence Service on 14 September 2020.

He also serves as a member of the Iraqi parliament from Nineveh and a member of the parliament's security and defense committee.
