= 2026 Green Zone raid =

Iraqi anti-corruption security force operation

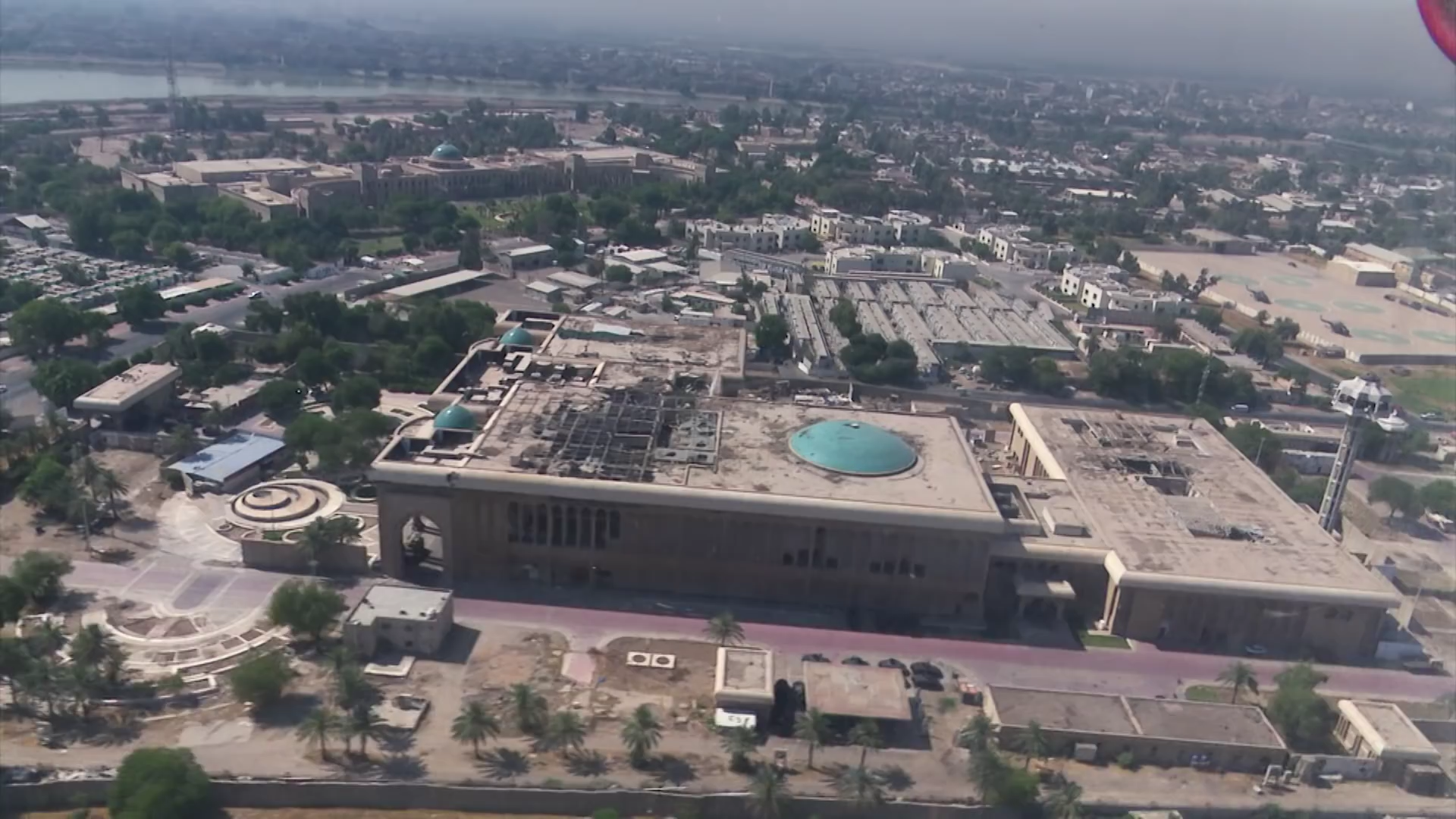
- The damaged former Arab Socialist Ba'ath Party Headquarters in the Green Zone in 2020
- Date: 28 June 2026
- Location: Green Zone, Baghdad, Iraq
- Type: Anti-corruption raid and political crackdown
- Cause: Discovery of the Al-Jumaili Oil Corruption Network; Execution of emergency judicial warrants following the lifting of legislative immunity
- Organised by: Ali al-Zaidi (Prime Minister of Iraq)
- Outcome: Successful detention of 47 high-ranking officials and political figures; Freezing of assets belonging to the suspects and their immediate families; Breakdown of the Al-Jumaili illicit oil-smuggling and bribery network; Temporary political isolation of the Al-Azm Alliance and parts of the Reconstruction and Development Coalition; Consolidation of Prime Minister al-Zaidi's executive authority
- Deaths: None
- Arrests: 47 (including 13 sitting Members of Parliament)

The 2026 Green Zone raid, dubbed Operation Dawn, was a massive, pre-dawn anti-corruption operation executed by Iraqi elite security forces on 28 June 2026 inside the heavily fortified Green Zone and surrounding neighborhoods of Baghdad. Ordered by the newly inaugurated Prime Minister Ali al-Zaidi and coordinated by the Federal Integrity Commission and the Iraqi judiciary, the raid resulted in the arrest of 47 high-ranking officials, including sitting members of parliament (MPs), political party leaders, and senior ministry executives.

The crackdown, widely compared by regional analysts to historical political purges due to its scale and high-profile targets, fundamentally shook the post-2003 Iraqi political establishment. It targeted deeply entrenched patronage networks involving the alleged systematic smuggling of Iraqi oil, illicit campaign financing, and the embezzlement of state funds.

== Background ==
Systemic corruption has plagued Iraq for decades, with the country consistently ranking near the bottom of Transparency International’s Corruption Perceptions Index. In May 2026, Ali al-Zaidi, a businessman with minimal traditional political baggage, assumed the office of Prime Minister. Al-Zaidi campaigned on a platform of aggressively dismantling entrenched corruption networks, bringing rogue armed factions under state control, and reassuring international partners ahead of a high-profile diplomatic visit to Washington, D.C. planned for July 2026.

The legal groundwork for the raids began in October 2025, when investigative judge Diaa Jaafar of the Central Criminal Court for Combating Corruption launched an inquiry into unusual, massive campaign spending by various legislative candidates. The investigation achieved a major breakthrough in May 2026 with the arrest of former Deputy Oil Minister Adnan al-Jumaili. During intensive interrogation by the Federal Integrity Commission, al-Jumaili confessed to operating a vast network that diverted state oil revenues, rigged ministry procurement contracts, and bribed lawmakers across multiple sectarian coalitions. The confessions directly implicated 47 key figures, including 13 sitting MPs whose parliamentary immunity was subsequently lifted via emergency judicial orders prior to the operation.

== Raid ==
At approximately 1:20 a.m. on Sunday, 28 June 2026, a joint force consisting of roughly 100 armored vehicles from the elite Counter Terrorism Service (CTS), the Iraqi Army, and the Rapid Response Forces' Tactical Division entered the fortified Green Zone. To maintain strict operational security, many field personnel were not briefed on their targets until deployment. The tactical units immediately sealed all entry and exit gates of the Green Zone, effectively isolating the local security forces normally tasked with guarding the district.

The raids focused heavily on the "Baghdad Residence" neighborhood, an upscale enclave near the United States Embassy that houses prominent cabinet ministers and legislators. Commando teams moved simultaneously against dozens of compounds. At the apartment of Bahaa al-Nouri—an MP belonging to former Prime Minister Mohammed Shia al-Sudani’s Reconstruction and Development Coalition—security forces spent three hours searching the premises, ultimately confiscating vast amounts of illicit cash and seizing several high-end luxury vehicles, including a Cadillac and a Range Rover.

Simultaneously, tactical teams executed coordinated arrests across other Baghdad neighborhoods, including the northern district of Adhamiyah, and raided the headquarters of the Midland Oil Company south of the capital. Despite unverified reports of sporadic gunfire, the operation achieved total tactical surprise, and all 47 targeted individuals were successfully detained without major armed resistance.

== Aftermath ==
On the morning of 28 June, the Iraqi News Agency (INA) and the Federal Integrity Commission officially confirmed the details of the sweep. Among the high-profile detainees were:

- Muthanna al-Samarrai: Leader of the Azem Alliance and a sitting member of parliament.
- Ali Maarej: Deputy Oil Minister for Distribution Affairs.
- Mohammad al-Karbouli: Member of parliament and political operative.
- Ziad al-Janabi: Member of parliament.
- Bahaa al-Nouri: Member of parliament.
- Hassan al-Khafaji: Member of parliament.
- Alia Nassif: Member of parliament.
- Muhammad Jamil Al-Mayahi: Former Governor of Wasit and member of parliament.
- Abdul Rahman al-Luizi: Member of parliament.
- Mudar al-Karwi: Member of parliament.
- Hind al-Abbasi: Member of parliament.
- Bushra al-Qaisi: Member of parliament.
- Mohammad Farman al-Jubouri: Member of parliament.
- Mohammed al-Sayhoud: Former member of parliament.
- Ibrahim al-Sumaidaie: Political analyst, legal adviser and media strategist.
- An unnamed brother and a former close adviser to the previous Prime Minister Mohammed Shia' al-Sudani.

Following the arrests, security forces maintained a heightened presence throughout the Green Zone, enforcing unprecedented security checks on all individuals leaving the area. The Central Criminal Court announced that the assets of all 47 individuals and their immediate families had been frozen pending formal corruption trials.

The Iraqi government later officially confirmed that at least 21 people had been detained during the crackdown, including former Labor and Social Affairs Minister Ahmed Al Asadi and former Salahaddin Governor Ahmed Abdullah al-Jubouri. The government also continued its anti-corruption campaign, with the Federal Commission of Integrity subsequently issuing 34 arrest warrants over the alleged seizure of state-owned properties in Anbar.

== Analysis ==
Domestic and international observers split on the long-term implications of the raid. Within Iraq, the operation granted Prime Minister Ali al-Zaidi a surge of "cautious popular legitimacy" among a public exhausted by multi-billion-dollar state embezzlement scandals. Proponents viewed the cross-sectarian nature of the arrests—which swept up prominent Sunni, Shia, and Iran-aligned figures alike—as evidence of an objective, rule-of-law crackdown.

Conversely, some Middle East analysts expressed skepticism, noting that while the 2026 raid used judicial mechanisms rather than theatrical violence, it served a similar functional purpose: consolidating executive authority and neutralizing potential political rivals early in a new administration. Dr. Tallha Abdulrazaq, writing on the regional dynamics, cautioned that the targeted individuals might represent "expendable fall guys," arguing that unless the crackdown dismantled the systemic Muhasasa (sectarian quota) system entirely, the underlying machinery of Iraqi corruption would persist.

Geopolitically, the timing of the raid was seen as highly strategic. It occurred on the same day Iranian Foreign Minister Abbas Araghchi arrived in Baghdad for diplomatic talks, and just weeks before al-Zaidi's scheduled summit in Washington, D.C. Analysts noted that by executing a sweeping raid against figures tied to illicit oil smuggling networks, al-Zaidi signaled a clear message to both Tehran and Washington that his administration was prepared to aggressively assert state sovereignty.
