= White Iraqiya Bloc =

National White Bloc الكتلة الوطنیة البیضاء
- Leader: Jamal Abed Almahdi Ali Albattikh
- Secretary-General: Jamal al-Bateikh
- Spokesperson: Aliya Nassif
- Parliamentary Head: Qutaibah Al Jabouri
- Founded: March 8, 2011
- Dissolved: 2013
- Split from: Iraqi National Movement
- Ideology: Catch-all
- Seats in the Council of Representatives: 0 / 328

Website
- Facebook page

The National White Bloc (Arabic: الكتلة الوطنیة البیضاء), formerly known as the Iraqi National Movement Party or the White Iraqiya, is an Iraqi political party.

== History ==
The White Bloc emerged from the political infighting of the Iraqi National Movement, with the group's 8 MPs leaving in early March 2011 in order to set up the White Bloc. The major disagreement between the White Bloc and the Iraqi National Movement were over the perceived growing sectarian nature of the Iraqi National Movement and also over disagreements with Ayad Allawi's leadership.

== National Affiliation ==
The White Bloc was in talks to unite with other parties that have splintered from the Iraqi National Movement in order to try and found a new list known as the National Resolution Trend.

For the 2013 governorate elections the White Bloc ran as part of the State of Law Coalition.

== Name ==
At its second 2nd Constitutional Conference the party voted to change its name from the White Iraqiya Bloc to the White Bloc.

== Members ==
Qutaibah al-Jabouri
Jamal al-Bateikh
Aliya Nassif
Kadhim al-Shummari
Aziz al-Mayyahi
Ahmed al-Oraibi
