= Islamic Dawa Party – Iraq Organisation =

Islamic Dawa Party – Iraq Organisation حزب الدعوة الاسلامية - تنظيم العراق
- Secretary-General: Nouri al-Maliki
- Founder: Hashim Al-Mosawy
- Founded: after 2003
- Headquarters: Baghdad
- Military wing: Quwat al-Shaheed al-Sadr's 35th Brigade (ar)
- Ideology: Shia Islamism; Clericalism; Islamic fundamentalism
- National affiliation: State of Law Coalition
- Seats in the Council of Representatives of Iraq: 0 / 329
- Seats in the local governorate councils: 0 / 440

Website
- aldaawa-io.org

The Islamic Dawa Party – Iraq Organisation (Arabic: Ḥizb al Daʿwa al-Islāmiyya - Tanzim al-Iraq) is the regional organisation of the Islamic Dawa Party registered after the fall of the Ba'athist regime. It was a component of the United Iraqi Alliance. It was allocated 12 seats by the Alliance after the elections in December 2005. It was led by Hashim Al-Mosawy, who was its Secretary-General. The head of the parliamentary bloc of the party was Kasim Muhammad Taqi al-Sahlani. The current Secretary-General is Nouri al-Maliki.

The Islamic Dawa Party was formed in 1957 in the Iraqi holy City of Najaf. Their aim was to create a movement which would promote Islamic values and ethics, and which would become an instrument for political activeness. This came at a time when there was widespread ignorance about religion and politics in Iraq. Mohammad Baqir al-Sadr laid out the foundations for the party and its political ideology, based on Wilayat Al-Umma (Governance of the people).

== See also ==
- List of Islamic political parties
