= Alliance of Nation State Forces =

Alliance of Nation State Forces تحالف قوى الدولة الوطنية
- Leader: Ammar al-Hakim; Haider al-Abadi
- Founded: January 5, 2021
- Merger of: Victory Alliance; National Wisdom Movement
- Political position: Centre
- Religion: Shia Islam
- Seats in the Council of Representatives of Iraq: 18 / 329

The Alliance of Nation State Forces (ANSF) (Arabic: تحالف قوى الدولة الوطنية, romanized: Taḥāluf Quwā ad-Dawla al-Waṭaniyya), also called the National State Forces Alliance (NSFA) is a Shia political party in Iraq, it currently holds 18 seats in the Iraqi Council of Representatives.

On 5 January 2021, the party was founded as a merger of the Victory Alliance and the National Wisdom Movement.

The Alliance of Nation State Forces is a member of the Coordination Framework, an alliance of Shia political parties and their associated militias. Within the Coordination Framework the Alliance is in the minority of parties which does not have an armed-wing. The party is a more moderate member of the framework, with the party maintaining ties both to the Iraqi Government and to Shia militias outside of the government's control. With the party working to provide these militias with extra legitimacy and ensure that the framework maintains access to institutional power.

The party positions itself as a centrist party.

== Election Results ==
Election	Leader	Votes	%	Seats	+/–	Position
2021	Haidar al-Abadi; Ammar al-Hakim	359,876	4.06%	4 / 329	New	▲10th
2025	Haidar al-Abadi; Ammar al-Hakim	513,715	4.57%	18 / 329	▲14	▲7th
