= Reconstruction and Development Coalition =

Political coalition in Iraq

Reconstruction and Development Coalition ائتلاف الإعمار والتنمية (Arabic)
- Leader: Baha Araji
- Spokesperson: Dhia al-Shaghati
- Founder: Mohammed Shia' al-Sudani
- Founded: 20 May 2025
- Ideology: Iraqi nationalism Pragmatism; Reformism
- Political position: Centre
- Member parties: Furatayn; al-Wataniya
- Slogan: Iraq First (Arabic: العراق اولا)
- Seats in the Council of Representatives of Iraq: 46 / 329

The Reconstruction and Development Coalition (Arabic: ائتلاف الإعمار والتنمية, romanized: Iʼtilāf al-Iʻmār wa-al-tanmiyah) is an alliance of political parties and an electoral and parliamentary group in Iraq. Founded by former prime minister Mohammed Shia' al-Sudani on 20 May 2025. It was formed to contest the parliamentary elections in 11 November 2025 and to support al-Sudani's bid for a second term as prime minister. At one point it consisted of multiple political parties and independent MPs. At its peak, it had 54 MPs. After two parties withdrew and many of its members being arrested on corruption charges, as of August 2026, only 7 of its original MPs remain.

The alliance includes Al-Sudani's Furatayn Movement and the National Coalition led by former prime minister Ayad Allawi. Until 15 May 2026, it also included the National Contract Alliance headed by Popular Mobilisation Forces chief Falih Al-Fayyadh and Bilad Sumer Bloc headed by Ahmed al-Asadi. On 15 May 2026, both of them withdrew their blocs from RDC in protest against what they described as violations of agreements during a parliamentary vote of confidence session held on 14 May 2026 for prime minister Ali al-Zaidi. Ibdaa' Karbala, Ajyal Group and Huloul Alliance left RDC after anti-corruption raids conducted by the Iraqi security forces.

== History ==
The bloc’s formation took place amid widening divisions within the Coordination Framework. In early 2025, several CF factions expressed unease over the prime minister’s growing local political base, particularly through alliances with governors Asaad Al Eidani of Basra, Nassif Al-Khattabi of Karbala, and Muhammad Al-Mayahi of Wasit. The alliance also attracted prominent figures from CF-affiliated parties, such as Oil Minister Hayan Abdul Ghani and MP Alia Nassif, further heightening tensions with his former partners.

== Political relations and rivalries ==
Prime Minister Mohammed Shia' al-Sudani’s relations with influential Shiite figures Muqtada al-Sadr and Grand Ayatollah Ali al-Sistani have shaped Iraq’s current political dynamics. Sistani’s religious establishment in Najaf has recently asserted greater influence in Baghdad, rejecting the idea of Iraq being part of regional external alliances. Sudani has engaged with Najaf’s positions, with Sistani’s representative Abdul Mahdi al-Karbalai urging the government to limit weapons to state authorities and strengthen state institutions. Regarding al-Sadr, while he has reaffirmed his boycott of the November 2025 elections, sources note that he has signaled readiness to support an “alternative bloc” that commits to his reform program, which includes restricting weapons to state forces and dissolving militias. This has prompted concerns among some factions of the Coordination Framework about a potential tacit alignment between al-Sadr and Sudani on issues of militia control, which could influence electoral dynamics ahead of the vote.

The coalition’s primary rival is the State of Law Coalition led by former Prime Minister Nouri al-Maliki. Multiple analyses describe a direct contest between Sudani and Maliki, especially in Baghdad, with Maliki retaining a strong support base there and across southern provinces such as Basra, Dhi Qar, Muthanna, and Karbala. Maliki’s support base is reported to include middle-class voters, state employees, and military personnel, and his ties to the Supreme Judicial Council have helped him resist efforts to sideline him. The rivalry has also surfaced in provincial contests, including the Baghdad governorship race, where the two blocs backed opposing candidates. Furthermore, the Iran-aligned militia Kata'ib Hezbollah and President Abdul Latif Rashid have both been reported as supporting measures to block al-Sudani’s legislative reforms ahead of the elections.

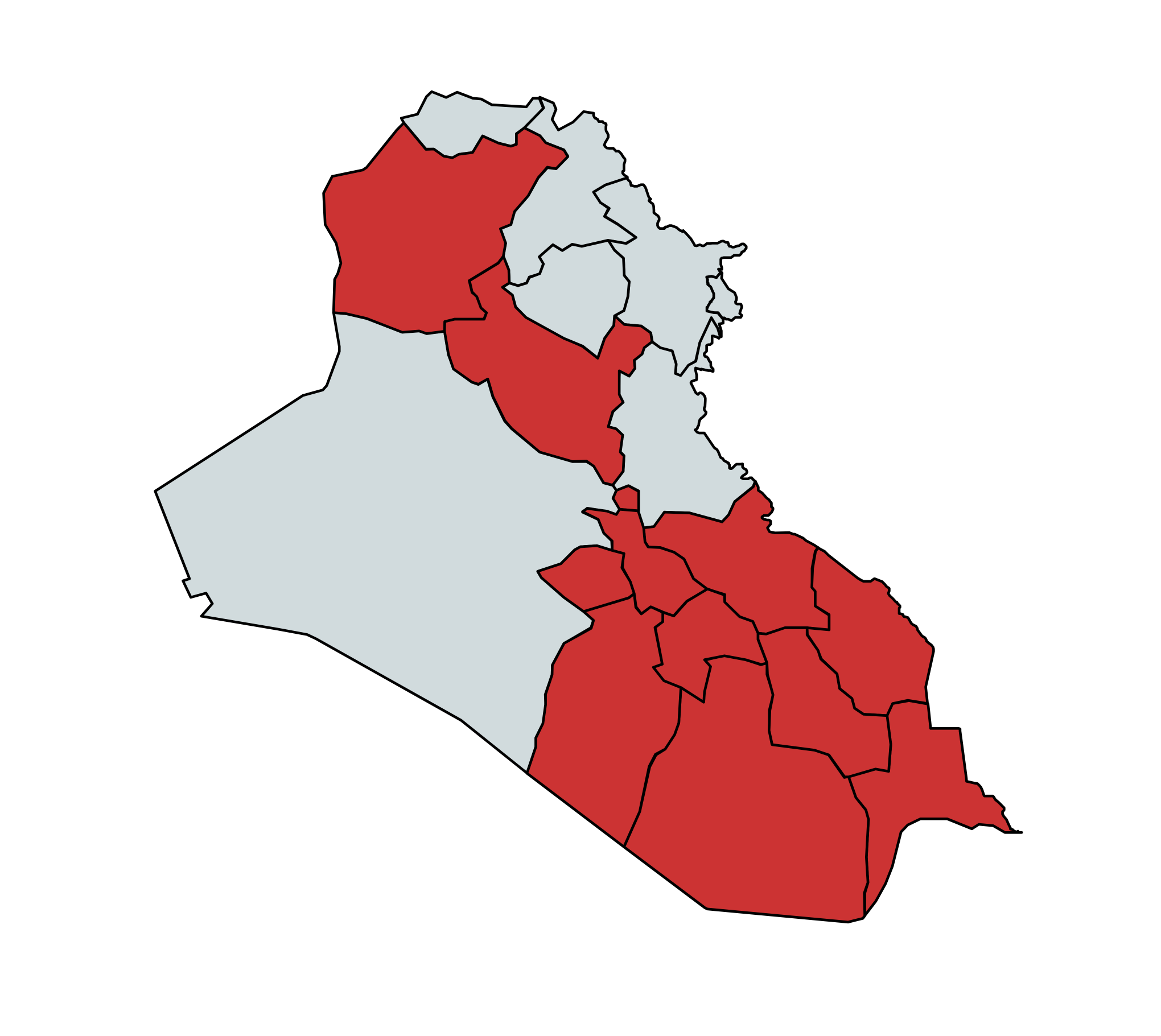
Governorates where Reconstruction and Development Coalition is running (12 of 19)

== Electoral campaign 2025 ==
The coalition nominated 446 candidates to contest 240 of the 329 parliamentary seats. Its electoral efforts were concentrated in 12 of Iraq's 19 governorates. Among these are 138 candidates for 71 seats in Baghdad, 62 candidates for 34 seats in Nineveh, and 50 candidates for 25 seats in Basra.

== Election results ==
Election	Leader	Votes	%	Seats	+/–	Position	Government
2025	Mohammed Shia' al-Sudani	1,318,687	11.74%	46 / 329	New	▲1st	Coalition
