= 2025 Iraqi parliamentary election =

- 11 November 2025
- All 329 seats in the Council of Representatives; 165 seats needed for a majority
- Turnout: 56.04% (▲12.50 pp)
Party	Leader	Vote %	Seats	+/–
RDC	Mohammed Shia' al-Sudani	11.74	46	New
KDP	Masoud Barzani	9.81	26	−5
Takadum	Mohamed Al-Halbousi	8.37	27	−10
State of Law	Nouri al-Maliki	6.49	29	−4
Al-Sadiqoun	Adnan Fihan Moussa Cheri	6.12	27	New
Badr	Hadi al-Amiri	4.96	18	New
PUK	Bafel Talabani	4.89	18	New
NSF	Ammar al-Hakim	4.57	18	+14
Azem	Muthanna Al-Samarai	4.31	15	+1
Sovereignty	Khamis al-Khanjar	2.82	9	New
Al-Asas Coalition	Muhsin Al-Mandalawi	2.59	8	New
Rights Movement	Hassan Muanes	2.06	6	+5
ND	Thabit al-Abbasi	2.02	5	New
Abshir Ya Iraq	Humam Hamoudi	1.88	4	New
Ishraqat Kanoon	Jaafar Aziz	1.78	8	+2
Services	Shibl al-Zaidi	1.70	5	New
Tasmim	Sarah al-Salihi	1.55	6	+1
KIU	Salahaddin Bahaaddin	1.49	4	New
Halwest	Ali Hama Saleh	1.40	5	New
NGM	Shaswar Abdulwahid	1.24	3	New
Al-Anbar	Mohamed Al-Halbousi	1.14	3	New
NFIP	Sheikh Abdullah Ajil Al-Yawar	0.99	3	New
Wasit Ajmal	Shibl al-Zaidi	0.95	4	New
NPM	Ahmed Abdullah al-Jubouri	0.93	3	New
Qimam	Mohamed Al-Halbousi	0.87	3	New
Tafawq Alliance	Faisal Al-Issawi	0.75	2	New
Sumerian		0.59	2	New
UITF	Mohammed Sama'an	0.59	2	New
Al-Faw Zakho	Amer Abdul-Jabbar	0.57	1	New
Saladin		0.51	1	New
NPU		0.50	2	New
AP	Khamis al-Khanjar	0.49	1	New
DFC	Nouri al-Maliki	0.48	1	New
AAK	Rakan Al-Jabouri	0.47	1	New
SPA		0.45	1	New
NI	Rayan al-Kildani	0.45	1	New
KDK	Ali Bapir	0.44	1	New
YCA	Murad Ismael	0.44	1	New
Thabitun	Burhan Al-Maamouri	0.27	1	New
Idraak	Akram Sharba	0.25	1	New
State Support	Murtadha Al-Saadi	0.19	1	New
Minorities		2.40	9	0
This lists parties that won seats. See the complete results below.
Results by governorate
Prime Minister before	Prime Minister after
Mohammed Shia' al-Sudani; Furatayn Movement	Ali al-Zaidi; Independent

Parliamentary elections were held in Iraq on 11 November 2025. The elections determined the 329 members of Iraq's Council of Representatives, who are responsible for electing the country's president, who would then appoint the prime minister.

== Background ==
The 2021 Iraqi parliamentary election resulted in violent protests in Baghdad as well as a political crisis of eleven months. On 3 August 2022, Muqtada al-Sadr called for snap elections, but was unsuccessful. Muqtada al-Sadr left politics and his party resigned from the Council of Representatives. There was speculation he would return to politics ahead of the elections but in July 2025, Sadr announced that he will boycott the elections.

== Electoral system ==
The electoral system was changed following the 2018 parliamentary elections amid the protests from 2019 to 2021. Previous parliamentary elections had been held using proportional representation, with seats allocated using the Webster/Sainte-Laguë method, using governorates as constituencies. As a result, the 2021 parliamentary elections were held using single non-transferable vote in 83 multi-member constituencies. For the 2025 parliamentary elections, the proportional representation system was reintroduced, with seats allocated using the modified Webster/Sainte-Laguë method with a divisor of 1.7, in 18 constituencies corresponding to Iraq's governorates (excluding Halabja). 83 seats are reserved for women, 9 seats are reserved for minorities (five for Christians and one each for Yazidis, Shabaks, Mandaeans and Feyli Kurds).

== Conduct ==
Advanced voting was conducted for 1.3 million members of the security forces and 26,500 internally displaced persons at 906 polling stations on 9 November.

The Independent High Electoral Commission (IHEC) announced that preliminary results would be released in the evening of 12 November. That same day, the electoral commission announced an unexpectedly high turnout of over 56%, considerably higher than the 41% seen in the 2021 election.

Some Iraqi political analysts observed that turnout was actually closer to 38% because the electoral commission's figure was based on the proportion of registered voters who had voted, and not the number of eligible voters comprising the total electorate. 9 million eligible Iraqi voters did not register to vote, which according to Erika Solomon and Falih Hassan, writing for The New York Times, is due to "low confidence in the Iraqi democratic process". According to many Iraqi politicians, vote buying "skyrocketed" in the election. According to estimations, the Kurdistan Democratic Party transferred 125,000 votes and the Patriotic Union of Kurdistan 12,000 to win quota seats.

Iraqi political scientist Ihsan al-Shammari said of the reportedly high turnout: "This is intentional obfuscation of participation to boost [the participating political parties'] legitimacy."

== Results ==
Early reports on 12 November saw multiple parties claiming electoral success. In particular, Prime Minister Sudani's Reconstruction and Development Coalition was, according to sources close to Sudani, set to secure the largest number of seats, with approximately 50 seats. Rudaw similarly projected Sudani's parliamentary group would finish first in Baghdad while achieving a 'landslide' victory in Iraq’s southern provinces of Najaf and Karbala. Two electoral commission officials independently informed Reuters that Sudani's bloc would be the largest party following the election.

For its part, the Badr Organization told Rudaw that it expected to win between "22 and 27" seats, including 9 in Sunni-majority northern provinces and 12 in Baghdad and the Shiite-majority south. This would mark an improvement on its 2021 showing of 17 seats. In Kurdistan Region, media reported a dominant performance from the Kurdistan Democratic Party, winning over 1 million votes (compared to 782,000 in 2021), with its main Kurdish rival, the Patriotic Union of Kurdistan, winning around half the number.

On 17 November 2025, IHEC announced that Sudani's Reconstruction and Development Coalition topped the final results with 46 seats in the 329-member Council of Representatives, followed by the Progress (Taqaddum) party of former Parliament Speaker Mohamed Al-Halbousi with 36 seats, and the State of Law Coalition of former Prime Minister Nouri al-Maliki with 29 seats. Subsequently, the Shia-led Coordination Framework declared that it had constituted itself as the largest parliamentary bloc by uniting its component parties, thereby positioning itself as a central force in government formation and parliamentary negotiations.

On 14 December 2025, the Federal Supreme Court of Iraq ratified the election results confirming that the Reconstruction and Development Coalition won the most seats. Out of 329, Shi'i parties secured 187 seats, Sunni parties 77 seats, Kurdish parties 56 seats and the rest, 9 seats in total, were allocated to minority groups.

Party	Votes	%	Seats
Reconstruction and Development Coalition	1,318,687	11.74	46
Kurdistan Democratic Party	1,101,357	9.81	26
Progress Party	939,810	8.37	27
State of Law Coalition	728,446	6.49	29
Al-Sadiqoun Bloc	686,902	6.12	27
Badr Organization	556,850	4.96	18
Patriotic Union of Kurdistan	548,928	4.89	15
Alliance of Nation State Forces	513,715	4.57	18
Azem Alliance	483,737	4.31	15
National Sovereignty Alliance	316,415	2.82	9
Iraqi Fundamental Coalition	291,128	2.59	8
Rights Movement	231,013	2.06	6
National Determination Alliance	226,469	2.02	5
Good News, Iraq	211,276	1.88	4
Ishraqat Kanoon	199,335	1.78	8
Services Alliance	190,707	1.70	5
Tasmim Alliance	173,761	1.55	6
Kurdistan Islamic Union	166,954	1.49	4
National Stance Movement	156,995	1.40	5
New Generation Movement	139,247	1.24	3
Al-Anbar Is Our Identity Alliance	128,325	1.14	3
Nineveh for Its People	111,125	0.99	3
Wasit Ajmal Alliance	106,152	0.95	4
National Party of the Masses	104,749	0.93	3
Qimam Coalition	97,635	0.87	3
Tafawq Alliance	84,326	0.75	2
Alternative Alliance	71,697	0.64	0
Sumerian Movement	66,468	0.59	2
Unified Iraqi Turkmen Front	66,179	0.59	2
Al-Faw Zakho Coalition	64,263	0.57	1
Saladin Unified Alliance	57,150	0.51	1
Nineveh's People Union	56,420	0.50	2
Arab Project	54,573	0.49	1
Diyala First Coalition	53,469	0.48	1
Arab Alliance in Kirkuk	53,046	0.47	1
Saladin Partnership Alliance	50,980	0.45	1
National Identity	50,200	0.45	1
Kurdistan Justice Group	49,756	0.44	1
Yazidi Cause Alliance	49,211	0.44	1
Our Hawks	41,434	0.37	0
Kirkuk Turkmen Salvation Alliance	32,751	0.29	0
National Depth Alliance	31,829	0.28	0
Thabitun	30,449	0.27	1
Nineveh First Alliance	29,381	0.26	0
Idraak Movement	28,491	0.25	1
State Support Bloc	21,615	0.19	1
People's Front	21,008	0.19	0
Qadimun	20,193	0.18	0
National Hadbaa Alliance	18,383	0.16	0
The Youth Machine	14,915	0.13	0
Civil Party	12,974	0.12	0
Civil Democratic Alliance	9,069	0.08	0
Leadership Alliance	8,226	0.07	0
National Pioneers Movement	7,389	0.07	0
Kurdistan Social Democratic Party	7,100	0.06	0
Sharqat Alliance	6,941	0.06	0
Diwaniyah Flame	5,612	0.05	0
Iraqi Altruism Party	5,505	0.05	0
Al-Umran Party	4,261	0.04	0
National Tribal Movement in Iraq	4,112	0.04	0
Iraq Reform Party	4,056	0.04	0
Rescuers	3,978	0.04	0
Iraqi Turkmen Front	2,395	0.02	0
National Brigade Party	1,774	0.02	0
Al-Daae Party	1,731	0.02	0
National Spread Party	1,603	0.01	0
Our Cause Movement	1,324	0.01	0
Fayli Front	1,159	0.01	0
National Al-Refah Party	234	0.00	0
Independents	22,495	0.20	0
Christian minority candidates	154,227	1.37	5
Feyli minority candidates	39,055	0.35	1
Yazidi minority candidates	32,169	0.29	1
Mandaean minority candidates	27,457	0.24	1
Shabak minority candidates	17,158	0.15	1
Total	11,229,909	100.00	329
Valid votes	11,267,161	93.92	
Invalid/blank votes	729,923	6.08	
Total votes	11,997,084	100.00	
Registered voters/turnout	21,406,882	56.04	

=== Results by governorate ===
Anbar Governorate
Party	Votes	%	Seats
Progress Party	212,838	33.64	5
Al-Anbar Is Our Identity Alliance	128,325	20.28	3
Qimam Coalition	97,635	15.43	3
Azem Alliance	78,446	12.40	2
Tafawq Alliance	47,074	7.44	1
National Sovereignty Alliance	40,820	6.45	1
National Determination Alliance	18,013	2.85	0
Leadership Alliance	8,226	1.30	0
Al-Umran Party	898	0.14	0
National Spread Party	480	0.08	0
Total	632,755	100.00	15
Valid votes	668,811	96.15	
Invalid/blank votes	26,782	3.85	
Total votes	695,593	100.00	
Registered voters/turnout	1,041,090	66.81	

Babylon Governorate
Party	Votes	%	Seats
Reconstruction and Development Coalition	91,424	16.47	3
Al-Sadiqoun Bloc	79,566	14.34	3
State of Law Coalition	68,584	12.36	3
Ishraqat Kanoon	56,174	10.12	2
Alliance of Nation State Forces	51,916	9.36	2
Services Alliance	38,547	6.95	1
Sumerian Movement	29,857	5.38	1
Idraak Movement	28,491	5.13	1
Badr Organization	25,192	4.54	1
Qadimun	20,193	3.64	0
Good News, Iraq	19,738	3.56	0
Rights Movement	16,416	2.96	0
Iraqi Fundamental Coalition	13,043	2.35	0
Al-Faw Zakho Coalition	10,287	1.85	0
National Depth Alliance	4,958	0.89	0
Al-Umran Party	354	0.06	0
Independent candidate	194	0.03	0
Total	554,934	100.00	17
Valid votes	538,701	95.66	
Invalid/blank votes	24,424	4.34	
Total votes	563,125	100.00	
Registered voters/turnout	1,107,189	50.86	

Baghdad Governorate
Party	Votes	%	Seats
Reconstruction and Development Coalition	411,300	20.72	15
Progress Party	277,416	13.98	10
State of Law Coalition	228,300	11.50	9
Alliance of Nation State Forces	138,904	7.00	5
Al-Sadiqoun Bloc	128,249	6.46	5
Azem Alliance	128,122	6.46	5
Badr Organization	116,704	5.88	4
National Sovereignty Alliance	110,037	5.54	4
Iraqi Fundamental Coalition	104,164	5.25	4
Rights Movement	77,763	3.92	3
National Determination Alliance	53,143	2.68	2
Good News, Iraq	38,762	1.95	1
Services Alliance	37,933	1.91	1
Ishraqat Kanoon	23,288	1.17	1
Al-Faw Zakho Coalition	22,004	1.11	0
Christian minority candidate	13,137	0.66	1
Alternative Alliance	12,278	0.62	0
National Depth Alliance	9,906	0.50	0
National Pioneers Movement	7,389	0.37	0
Mandaean minority candidate	5,410	0.27	1
Iraq Reform Party	4,056	0.20	0
Mandaean minority candidate	3,354	0.17	0
Rescuers	2,876	0.14	0
Mandaean minority candidate	2,677	0.13	0
Civil Democratic Alliance	2,616	0.13	0
Mandaean minority candidate	2,346	0.12	0
Mandaean minority candidate	1,940	0.10	0
Mandaean minority candidate	1,932	0.10	0
Mandaean minority candidate	1,761	0.09	0
Mandaean minority candidate	1,602	0.08	0
Mandaean minority candidate	1,316	0.07	0
Mandaean minority candidate	1,184	0.06	0
Fayli Front	1,159	0.06	0
National Tribal Movement in Iraq	1,124	0.06	0
National Spread Party	1,123	0.06	0
Mandaean minority candidate	1,082	0.05	0
Mandaean minority candidate	1,023	0.05	0
Mandaean minority candidate	948	0.05	0
Independent candidate	939	0.05	0
Mandaean minority candidate	882	0.04	0
Our Cause Movement	813	0.04	0
Independent candidate	805	0.04	0
Al-Umran Party	717	0.04	0
Christian minority candidate	706	0.04	0
Al-Daae Party	693	0.03	0
Independent candidate	574	0.03	0
Independent candidate	181	0.01	0
Independent candidate	163	0.01	0
Total	1,984,801	100.00	71
Valid votes	2,024,499	95.05	
Invalid/blank votes	105,384	4.95	
Total votes	2,129,883	100.00	
Registered voters/turnout	4,359,490	48.86	

Basra Governorate
Party	Votes	%	Seats
Tasmim Alliance	173,761	21.84	6
Al-Sadiqoun Bloc	151,274	19.02	5
Reconstruction and Development Coalition	126,077	15.85	4
State of Law Coalition	69,445	8.73	2
Alliance of Nation State Forces	54,652	6.87	2
Rights Movement	49,545	6.23	2
Badr Organization	47,327	5.95	1
Good News, Iraq	44,584	5.60	1
Al-Faw Zakho Coalition	31,972	4.02	1
Iraqi Fundamental Coalition	31,718	3.99	1
Services Alliance	11,158	1.40	0
National Depth Alliance	2,438	0.31	0
National Tribal Movement in Iraq	1,551	0.19	0
Total	795,502	100.00	25
Valid votes	798,233	96.41	
Invalid/blank votes	29,733	3.59	
Total votes	827,966	100.00	
Registered voters/turnout	1,620,211	51.10	

Dhi Qar Governorate
Party	Votes	%	Seats
Reconstruction and Development Coalition	80,892	15.20	3
State of Law Coalition	74,563	14.01	3
Al-Sadiqoun Bloc	61,696	11.59	3
Alliance of Nation State Forces	46,607	8.76	2
Badr Organization	44,421	8.35	2
Sumerian Movement	36,611	6.88	1
Services Alliance	31,171	5.86	1
Good News, Iraq	23,214	4.36	1
Ishraqat Kanoon	22,521	4.23	1
State Support Bloc	21,615	4.06	1
Rights Movement	21,184	3.98	1
Alternative Alliance	19,672	3.70	0
Iraqi Fundamental Coalition	16,171	3.04	0
The Youth Machine	14,915	2.80	0
Civil Democratic Alliance	6,453	1.21	0
Iraqi Altruism Party	5,505	1.03	0
National Depth Alliance	4,946	0.93	0
Total	532,157	100.00	19
Valid votes	513,087	95.30	
Invalid/blank votes	25,303	4.70	
Total votes	538,390	100.00	
Registered voters/turnout	1,099,438	48.97	

Diyala Governorate
Party	Votes	%	Seats
Badr Organization	105,346	18.73	3
Progress Party	101,691	18.08	3
National Sovereignty Alliance	77,496	13.78	2
Al-Sadiqoun Bloc	55,409	9.85	2
Azem Alliance	54,939	9.77	2
Diyala First Coalition	53,469	9.51	1
Thabitun	30,449	5.41	1
Patriotic Union of Kurdistan	29,103	5.18	0
Alliance of Nation State Forces	20,749	3.69	0
Our Hawks	20,209	3.59	0
Ishraqat Kanoon	7,613	1.35	0
New Generation Movement	1,559	0.28	0
Alternative Alliance	1,201	0.21	0
Al-Daae Party	1,038	0.18	0
Al-Umran Party	822	0.15	0
Independent candidate	644	0.11	0
Kurdistan Social Democratic Party	433	0.08	0
Independent candidate	199	0.04	0
Total	562,369	100.00	14
Valid votes	565,557	94.30	
Invalid/blank votes	34,177	5.70	
Total votes	599,734	100.00	
Registered voters/turnout	1,043,840	57.45	

Duhok Governorate
Party	Votes	%	Seats
Kurdistan Democratic Party	413,890	72.07	9
Kurdistan Islamic Union	72,986	12.71	2
Christian minority candidate	22,838	3.98	1
Christian minority candidate	22,067	3.84	0
National Stance Movement	18,322	3.19	0
New Generation Movement	14,674	2.56	0
People's Front	2,789	0.49	0
Patriotic Union of Kurdistan	2,426	0.42	0
Christian minority candidate	1,493	0.26	0
Kurdistan Justice Group	1,419	0.25	0
Christian minority candidate	831	0.14	0
Kurdistan Social Democratic Party	295	0.05	0
Independent candidate	276	0.05	0
Total	574,306	100.00	12
Valid votes	590,277	94.45	
Invalid/blank votes	34,694	5.55	
Total votes	624,971	100.00	
Registered voters/turnout	805,269	77.61	

Erbil Governorate
Party	Votes	%	Seats
Kurdistan Democratic Party	369,724	55.57	9
Patriotic Union of Kurdistan	97,411	14.64	3
National Stance Movement	63,298	9.51	2
New Generation Movement	38,921	5.85	1
Kurdistan Islamic Union	28,656	4.31	0
Christian minority candidate	18,517	2.78	1
Kurdistan Justice Group	13,774	2.07	0
Christian minority candidate	13,614	2.05	0
Christian minority candidate	7,174	1.08	0
People's Front	5,589	0.84	0
Independent candidate	3,454	0.52	0
Christian minority candidate	2,392	0.36	0
Iraqi Turkmen Front	1,814	0.27	0
Kurdistan Social Democratic Party	762	0.11	0
Independent candidate	222	0.03	0
Total	665,322	100.00	16
Valid votes	683,989	85.40	
Invalid/blank votes	116,900	14.60	
Total votes	800,889	100.00	
Registered voters/turnout	1,115,122	71.82	

Karbala Governorate
Party	Votes	%	Seats
Reconstruction and Development Coalition	78,388	25.89	3
State of Law Coalition	59,314	19.59	2
Ishraqat Kanoon	42,814	14.14	2
Iraqi Fundamental Coalition	27,715	9.15	1
Al-Sadiqoun Bloc	26,816	8.86	1
Alliance of Nation State Forces	22,262	7.35	1
Badr Organization	20,299	6.70	1
Good News, Iraq	9,270	3.06	0
Alternative Alliance	7,789	2.57	0
Rights Movement	4,887	1.61	0
National Depth Alliance	2,443	0.81	0
Our Cause Movement	511	0.17	0
Independent candidate	299	0.10	0
Total	302,807	100.00	11
Valid votes	298,692	94.29	
Invalid/blank votes	18,078	5.71	
Total votes	316,770	100.00	
Registered voters/turnout	666,052	47.56	

Kirkuk Governorate
Party	Votes	%	Seats
Patriotic Union of Kurdistan	178,845	28.30	4
Progress Party	107,037	16.94	3
Unified Iraqi Turkmen Front	66,179	10.47	2
Kurdistan Democratic Party	59,374	9.40	1
Arab Alliance in Kirkuk	53,046	8.39	1
Azem Alliance	46,412	7.34	1
Kirkuk Turkmen Salvation Alliance	32,751	5.18	0
National Determination Alliance	27,279	4.32	0
Christian minority candidate	17,680	2.80	1
Christian minority candidate	12,838	2.03	0
New Generation Movement	12,332	1.95	0
Christian minority candidate	6,213	0.98	0
Christian minority candidate	3,957	0.63	0
Christian minority candidate	1,722	0.27	0
People's Front	1,702	0.27	0
Christian minority candidate	1,473	0.23	0
Kurdistan Social Democratic Party	791	0.13	0
Al-Umran Party	626	0.10	0
National Tribal Movement in Iraq	521	0.08	0
Christian minority candidate	470	0.07	0
Independent candidate	389	0.06	0
National Al-Refah Party	234	0.04	0
Independent candidate	82	0.01	0
Total	631,953	100.00	13
Valid votes	592,283	95.26	
Invalid/blank votes	29,490	4.74	
Total votes	621,773	100.00	
Registered voters/turnout	953,267	65.23	

Maysan Governorate
Party	Votes	%	Seats
Reconstruction and Development Coalition	67,122	28.01	3
Badr Organization	41,029	17.12	2
State of Law Coalition	34,706	14.48	2
Al-Sadiqoun Bloc	34,590	14.43	2
Alliance of Nation State Forces	31,744	13.24	1
Rights Movement	12,993	5.42	0
Independent candidate	11,877	4.96	0
Good News, Iraq	5,084	2.12	0
National Tribal Movement in Iraq	524	0.22	0
Total	239,669	100.00	10
Valid votes	241,489	93.97	
Invalid/blank votes	15,499	6.03	
Total votes	256,988	100.00	
Registered voters/turnout	609,215	42.18	

Muthanna Governorate
Party	Votes	%	Seats
Reconstruction and Development Coalition	57,411	23.04	2
State of Law Coalition	41,408	16.62	2
Al-Sadiqoun Bloc	37,183	14.93	1
Alliance of Nation State Forces	34,740	13.94	1
Iraqi Fundamental Coalition	32,817	13.17	1
Badr Organization	14,123	5.67	0
Good News, Iraq	12,702	5.10	0
Rights Movement	10,784	4.33	0
Services Alliance	7,961	3.20	0
Total	249,129	100.00	7
Valid votes	241,572	96.38	
Invalid/blank votes	9,062	3.62	
Total votes	250,634	100.00	
Registered voters/turnout	492,812	50.86	

Najaf Governorate
Party	Votes	%	Seats
Reconstruction and Development Coalition	56,464	16.25	2
Alliance of Nation State Forces	45,224	13.02	2
State of Law Coalition	41,173	11.85	2
Al-Sadiqoun Bloc	40,338	11.61	2
Services Alliance	33,000	9.50	1
Good News, Iraq	32,706	9.41	1
Iraqi Fundamental Coalition	27,657	7.96	1
Ishraqat Kanoon	24,823	7.15	1
Alternative Alliance	16,213	4.67	0
Badr Organization	13,103	3.77	0
Rights Movement	11,538	3.32	0
National Depth Alliance	3,122	0.90	0
Rescuers	1,102	0.32	0
Independent candidate	638	0.18	0
Al-Umran Party	316	0.09	0
Total	347,417	100.00	12
Valid votes	342,485	95.10	
Invalid/blank votes	17,655	4.90	
Total votes	360,140	100.00	
Registered voters/turnout	824,690	43.67	

Nineveh Governorate
Party	Votes	%	Seats
Kurdistan Democratic Party	189,535	14.49	5
Progress Party	157,958	12.08	4
Reconstruction and Development Coalition	146,859	11.23	4
Nineveh for Its People	111,125	8.50	3
Azem Alliance	101,035	7.73	3
National Determination Alliance	86,656	6.63	2
Badr Organization	77,046	5.89	2
National Sovereignty Alliance	64,545	4.94	2
Nineveh's People Union	56,420	4.31	2
Arab Project	54,573	4.17	1
National Identity	50,200	3.84	1
Yazidi Cause Alliance	49,211	3.76	1
National Party of the Masses	37,381	2.86	1
Nineveh First Alliance	29,381	2.25	0
National Hadbaa Alliance	18,383	1.41	0
Civil Party	12,974	0.99	0
Shabak minority candidate	10,501	0.80	1
Yazidi minority candidate	9,687	0.74	1
Christian minority candidate	6,234	0.48	1
Yazidi minority candidate	5,959	0.46	0
Yazidi minority candidate	5,441	0.42	0
Yazidi minority candidate	4,658	0.36	0
Iraqi Fundamental Coalition	3,472	0.27	0
Yazidi minority candidate	3,320	0.25	0
Shabak minority candidate	3,231	0.25	0
Shabak minority candidate	2,056	0.16	0
Yazidi minority candidate	2,001	0.15	0
New Generation Movement	1,980	0.15	0
National Brigade Party	1,774	0.14	0
Shabak minority candidate	1,370	0.10	0
Yazidi minority candidate	1,103	0.08	0
Christian minority candidate	871	0.07	0
Al-Umran Party	528	0.04	0
Independent candidate	422	0.03	0
Total	1,307,890	100.00	34
Valid votes	1,308,021	96.45	
Invalid/blank votes	48,131	3.55	
Total votes	1,356,152	100.00	
Registered voters/turnout	2,079,220	65.22	

Qadisiyyah Governorate
Party	Votes	%	Seats
Reconstruction and Development Coalition	70,953	20.79	3
State of Law Coalition	52,568	15.40	2
Badr Organization	35,073	10.28	2
Al-Sadiqoun Bloc	34,490	10.11	1
Alliance of Nation State Forces	31,123	9.12	1
Services Alliance	30,937	9.06	1
Ishraqat Kanoon	22,102	6.48	1
Good News, Iraq	19,585	5.74	0
Iraqi Fundamental Coalition	18,519	5.43	0
Rights Movement	13,616	3.99	0
Diwaniyah Flame	5,612	1.64	0
Alternative Alliance	5,113	1.50	0
National Depth Alliance	1,548	0.45	0
Independent candidate	59	0.02	0
Total	341,298	100.00	11
Valid votes	327,703	95.01	
Invalid/blank votes	17,207	4.99	
Total votes	344,910	100.00	
Registered voters/turnout	699,986	49.27	

Saladin Governorate
Party	Votes	%	Seats
Progress Party	82,870	15.18	2
Reconstruction and Development Coalition	80,528	14.75	2
Azem Alliance	74,783	13.70	2
National Party of the Masses	67,368	12.34	2
Saladin Unified Alliance	57,150	10.47	1
Saladin Partnership Alliance	50,980	9.34	1
National Determination Alliance	41,378	7.58	1
Tafawq Alliance	37,252	6.82	1
National Sovereignty Alliance	23,517	4.31	0
Our Hawks	21,225	3.89	0
Sharqat Alliance	6,941	1.27	0
Alternative Alliance	1,543	0.28	0
National Tribal Movement in Iraq	392	0.07	0
Total	545,927	100.00	12
Valid votes	573,497	95.79	
Invalid/blank votes	25,189	4.21	
Total votes	598,686	100.00	
Registered voters/turnout	890,969	67.19	

Sulaymaniyah Governorate
Party	Votes	%	Seats
Patriotic Union of Kurdistan	241,143	42.13	8
National Stance Movement	75,375	13.17	3
New Generation Movement	69,781	12.19	2
Kurdistan Democratic Party	68,834	12.03	2
Kurdistan Islamic Union	65,312	11.41	2
Kurdistan Justice Group	34,563	6.04	1
People's Front	10,928	1.91	0
Kurdistan Social Democratic Party	4,819	0.84	0
Iraqi Turkmen Front	581	0.10	0
Independent candidate	473	0.08	0
Independent candidate	226	0.04	0
Independent candidate	196	0.03	0
Independent candidate	183	0.03	0
Total	572,414	100.00	18
Valid votes	604,645	81.46	
Invalid/blank votes	137,611	18.54	
Total votes	742,256	100.00	
Registered voters/turnout	1,227,460	60.47	

Wasit Governorate
Party	Votes	%	Seats
Wasit Ajmal Alliance	106,152	27.27	4
State of Law Coalition	58,385	15.00	2
Reconstruction and Development Coalition	51,269	13.17	2
Al-Sadiqoun Bloc	37,291	9.58	2
Alliance of Nation State Forces	35,794	9.20	1
Feyli minority candidate	17,188	4.42	1
Badr Organization	17,187	4.42	0
Iraqi Fundamental Coalition	15,852	4.07	0
Rights Movement	12,287	3.16	0
Alternative Alliance	7,888	2.03	0
Feyli minority candidate	7,495	1.93	0
Good News, Iraq	5,631	1.45	0
Feyli minority candidate	4,065	1.04	0
Feyli minority candidate	3,500	0.90	0
National Depth Alliance	2,468	0.63	0
Feyli minority candidate	2,255	0.58	0
Feyli minority candidate	1,757	0.45	0
Feyli minority candidate	1,176	0.30	0
Feyli minority candidate	976	0.25	0
Feyli minority candidate	643	0.17	0
Total	389,259	100.00	12
Valid votes	353,620	96.03	
Invalid/blank votes	14,604	3.97	
Total votes	368,224	100.00	
Registered voters/turnout	771,562	47.72	

== Aftermath ==
=== Reactions ===
==== International ====
Two days before the elections, Esmail Baghaei, spokesman for the Iranian Foreign Ministry, accused the United States of "interfering in Iraq's electoral process" despite "Iran routinely facing accusations of interfering in Iraq's affairs," stating: "Any foreign interference in this process is condemned and rejected by the Iraqi people, the government of this country, and other responsible countries. American interference is definitely harmful."

On 12 November, the French Government released a statement welcoming the legislative elections of the previous day and celebrating the "smooth unfolding" of the elections, stating that it "is consistent with the progress that Iraq has made on the political and security fronts." The statement reiterated France's support for Iraq in strengthening its institutions and its role in regional peace and stability.

On the same date, the European Union commended the Iraqi people for exercising their right to vote and highlighted the potential stemming from the election to strengthen Iraq's institutions, inclusivity, and accountability. The statement "welcomed" the efforts of various Iraqi authorities and civil society bodies in facilitating the vote and the resultant increased turnout compared to 2021 and 2018. The EU reaffirmed its commitment to Iraqi's unity, sovereignty, and territorial sovereignty as an EU partner.

US special envoy to Iraq Mark Savaya, hailed the elections as a "clear sign" of progress. He commended Prime Minister Sudani and his government and reiterated America's support to "end external interference and armed militias."

United Nations General Secretary António Guterres called for a swift formation of Iraq's next government, lauding the calm and orderly elections as "effective" and reaffirming his organisation's support for Iraq.

==== Internal ====
On 13 November, the day after preliminary results were announced, Iraq's Supreme Judicial Council called on the winners of the election to quickly begin negotiations to form the country's next legislature and government within constitutional timelines.

Following the preliminary results, Kataib Hezbollah (who ran under the Hoquq Movement parliamentary list) Secretary General Abu Hussein al-Hammidawi said many of the winning candidates shared the ideologies of the Islamic Resistance, while also celebrating the increased turnout.

Speaker of the Council of Representatives, Mahmoud al-Mashhadani, similarly called for newly elected political blocs to expedite government formation within constitutional timelines, emphasising that swift coordination among political forces was necessary to maintain stability and public confidence.

Kurdistan Democratic Party (KDP) President Masoud Barzani congratulated the people of "the Kurdistan Region and Iraq" on the "success" of the elections, thanking the KDP's leadership, members, supporters, and security forces for facilitating the election and for delivering the success of the party's "One Million Votes and More" campaign.

=== Government formation ===
Following the announcement of the preliminary result, Sudani congratulated his supporters on his coalition having secured victory in the election. Meanwhile the Shiite Coordination Framework was preparing to declare itself the largest parliamentary bloc and would be in a position to form the government. (Note: Since 2010, following a verdict issued by the Supreme Court of Iraq, the winner of elections –i.e. the bloc (party) with the largest number of seats in parliament– would not automatically be tasked with forming the government, instead, the term "largest bloc" (Arabic: الكتلة الأكبر) mentioned in Article 76 of the Iraqi constitution was interpreted to include coalitions formed after the elections among parliamentary parties. In 2021, the Supreme Court issued a verdict rendering the appointment of the President of Iraq by the Council of Representatives unconstitutional if 1/3 of the Council's members is not present in the appointment session, essentially giving any coalition possessing 1/3 of the seats within the parliament the authority to veto government formation. This is due to the fact that the Iraqi constitution stipulates that the government can only be formed after the parliament appoints the president (of the republic), who will subsequently name the nominee of the "largest parliamentary bloc", as prime minister who forms the government.) Mukhtar al-Moussawi, a senior Badr Organisation official and Coordination Framework leader, told Shafaq News that CF affiliated parties had won enough seats to control the legislature and select the next prime minister without the participation of Sudani's Reconstruction and Development coalition. Shafaq News also reported that Coordination Framework leaders had launched internal talks to shape the next government and aimed to choose the next prime minister based on experience, consensus, and international backing.

For his part, Sudani's first post-election speech proclaimed his Reconstruction and Development alliance was open to forming a coalition to "everyone without exception" to form the new government. Though Sudani's previous administration hinged on support from the Coordination Framework, senior Iraqi politicians told Agence France-Presse that the Coordination Framework is divided over supporting a second term for Sudani, with Nouri al-Maliki, whose State of Law coalition holds around 27 seats, opposed to the move. A senior Iraqi politician told the Financial Times that Maliki "would rather die than see Sudani come back as PM." France24 reported that "long-term powerbrokers, including from the Coordination Framework" worry Sudani has amassed too much power in his first term and that his office may have wiretapped the phones of politicians.

Ali Hussein, KDP Political Bureau member, expressed his party's desire for an alliance between the Kurdish parties to strengthen their stance in negotiations advocating for Kurdish "constitutional rights".

US officials reportedly demanded that six Iran-backed armed groups be disarmed and (those with political representation) be excluded from the next government; that is, Kata'ib Hezbollah (KH), Harakat al-Nujaba, Asa'ib Ahl al-Haq (AAH), Kata'ib Sayyid al-Shuhada, Harakat Ansar Allah al-Awfiya and Kata'ib al-Imam Ali. AAH represented by Sadiqoun is currently in the government, while KH represented by Huqouq is a member of CF; both are members of the State Administration Assembly (ائتلاف ادارة الدولة).

In December 2025, Asa'ib Ahl al-Haq, Kata'ib Sayyid Al-Shuhada, Harakat Ansar Allah al-Awfiya and Kata'ib al-Imam Ali announced their willingness to disarm, while Kata'ib Hezbollah and Harakat al-Nujaba refused, saying "weapons will remain [in our hands], and no discussions with the government can take place before the departure of all occupation forces, NATO troops, and Turkish forces, and before ensuring the protection of the people and the sacred sites from extremist groups". The head of Iraq's judiciary, chief justice Faiq Zaidan thanked faction leaders for heeding his advice to "coordinate together to enforcing the rule of law, restrict weapons to state control, and transition to political action after the national need for military action has ceased", in a separate announcement, the Supreme Judicial Council stated that the chief justice's intervention was to remind political actors to uphold Article 9 of the Iraqi constitution, which "prohibits the formation of armed militias outside the framework of the state".

On 24 January 2026, the Coordination Framework nominated, by a simple majority vote, former PM Nouri al-Maliki for the premiership. The decision was reportedly influenced by the latter's "political and administrative experience and his role in managing the state". Immediately afterwards, US President Donald Trump threatened to block Iraq's access to the petrodollar in the event that it goes ahead with the nomination. On 3 March 2026, the Coordination Framework withdrew al-Maliki’s nomination.

On 13 April 2026, deliberations within CF were still ongoing with names such as the current premier al-Sudani, former PM Haidar al-Abadi, Iraqi National Intelligence Service director Hamid al-Shattri and national security advisor Qasim al-Araji being considered. Nouri al-Maliki was reportedly still considered a candidate. On 27 April 2026, CF announced the nomination of businessman Ali al-Zaidi for the premiership. The president then formally named him and he subsequently became tasked with forming the government.

He was officially sworn in during a parliamentary session held on 14 May 2026, with partial parliamentary approval for his cabinet. 14 ministerial posts were approved, but 9 others, among them those of defense and the interior remained vacant due to lack of consensus at the time. A fight broke out during the session between some of the MPs (while others, such as Qais al-Khazali and Bafel Talabani were reportedly celebrating together) which prompted the parliament speaker to immediately adjourn the session.
