= Ishraqat Kanoon =

Political Party in Iraq

Ishraqat Kanoon إشراقة كانون
- Leader: Jaafar Aziz
- Ideology: Islamic democracy; Moderation
- Political position: Centre
- Religion: Shia Islam
- Colours: Cyan
- Council of Representatives: 8 / 329

Website
- eshraqa.org

Ishraqat Kanoon (Arabic: إشراقة كانون, romanized: Ishrāqat Kānūn) is an Islamic political party that first contested the 2021 Iraqi parliamentary election, winning six seats. In 2022, it gained an additional seat. The party is widely believed to have links to elements of the Najaf clergy. Ideologically, Ishraqat Kanoon seeks to combine Islamic principles with civil and reform-oriented values, and it has been described as attempting to bridge secular civic approaches with religious identity.

The party received 100,374 votes, 1.13% of the national total, in the 2021 election. It won two seats each in the Babylon and Karbala governorates, and one seat each in Baghdad and Al-Qadisiyyah. Ishraqat Kanoon emerged partly from networks associated with the Tishreen protest movement, although analysts note that its ability to reshape Iraq’s political balance has been constrained by state repression, fragmentation within protest-origin groups, and co-optation by established parties.

In the Council of Representatives, the party formed the Ishraqa Bloc in 2022, a parliamentary group comprising ten members, including four independents aligned with its positions.

== Election results ==
Election	Leader	Votes	%	Seats	+/–	Position	Government
2021	Jaafar Aziz	100,374	1.13%	6 / 329	New	▲14th	Opposition
2025	Jaafar Aziz	199,335	1.78%	8 / 329	▲2	▼15th	TBA
