= Tasmim Alliance =

Political Party in Iraq

Tasmim Alliance تحالف تصميم
- Leader: Amer al-Fayaz
- Founded: 2021
- Split from: Fatah Alliance
- Headquarters: Basra
- Ideology: Shia Islamism; Islamic democracy
- Religion: Shia Islam
- Colors: Gold
- Council of Representatives: 6 / 329
- Seats in the Governorate Councils: 5 / 440
- Governors: 1 / 18

Tasmim Alliance (Arabic: تحالف تصميم) is a political party in Iraq. The party competed for the first time in the 2021 Iraqi parliamentary election and won 5 seats. It got 153,614 votes or 1.73% of the total votes in the 2021 election. It won all of its 5 seats from Basra Governorate.

The leader of the party is Amer al-Fayaz, who was earlier a member of Fatah party.

== Election results ==
Election	Leader	Votes	%	Seats	+/–	Position	Government
2021	Sarah al-Salihi	153,614	1.73%	5 / 329	New	▲12th	Opposition
2025	Sarah al-Salihi	173,761	1.55%	6 / 329	▲1	▼17th	TBA
