= Al-Sadiqoun Bloc =

Al-Sadiqoun Bloc كتلة الصادقون
- Leader: Adnan Fayhan Moussa Cheri (political leader)
- Founded: 2014
- Military wing: Asa'ib Ahl al-Haq
- Ideology: Political Islam; Religious conservatism Islamism; Islamic violence Islamic conservatism Anti-Americanism
- Political position: Right-wing to Far-right
- Religion: Shia Islam
- National affiliation: Fatah Alliance (2018–2025)
- Seats in the Council of Representatives: 27 / 329

Website
- alsadiqon.iq

Al-Sadiqoun Bloc (Arabic: كتلة الصادقون) or just Al-Sadiqoun is a Shia Islamist political party in Iraq led by Adnan Fayhan Moussa Cheri.

== History ==
Al-Sadiqoun (literally the speakers of the truth in Arabic) is a political wing of the Shia Asa'ib Ahl al-Haq (AAH; Arabic: عصائب أهل الحق ‘Aṣayib Ahl al-Haq, "League of the Righteous"), a Shia anti-American group with alleged Iranian patronage.

Asa'ib Ahl al-Haq leader Qais Khazali declared the intention of his group of taking part in the 2014 Iraqi Parliamentary elections as a political bloc under the name of Al-Sadiqoun Bloc. Adnan Fihan Moussa Cheri was named leader of the bloc. Al-Sadiqoun Bloc offered its candidates under electoral listing #218.

However an electoral meeting of estimated 10,000 supporters of Al-Sadiqoun was marred by violence as a series of bombs exploded at the campaign rally held at the Industrial Stadium in eastern Baghdad killing at least 37 people and wounding scores of others, according to Iraqi police. The Shia group organizers had planned to announce at the rally the names of its candidates for the parliamentary election.

The Al-Sadiqoun Bloc ended up winning just one seat out of the total 328 seats in the Council of Representatives for 2014, with its successful candidate elected from the Baghdad Governorate.

== Election results ==
| Election | Leader | Votes | % | Seats | +/– | Position | Government |
|---|---|---|---|---|---|---|---|
| 2014 | Adnan Fihan Moussa Cheri | 36,026 | 0.28% | 1 / 328 | New | ▲31st | Support |
| 2018 | Adnan Fihan Moussa Cheri | As part of Fatah | | 48 / 329 | —N/a | ▲2nd | Opposition |
| 2021 | Adnan Fihan Moussa Cheri | As part of Fatah | | 17 / 329 | ▼21 | ▼5th | Coalition |
| 2025 | Adnan Fihan Moussa Cheri | 686,902 | 6.12% | 27 / 329 | ▲10 | 5th | Coalition |

== See also ==
- List of Islamic political parties
