= Azem Alliance =

Azem Alliance تحالف عزم هاوپەیمانی ئەزم
- Leader: Muthanna Al-Samarrai
- Founder: Khamis al-Khanjar
- Founded: 9 December 2021; 4 years ago
- Ideology: Sunni Islamism; Iraqi nationalism Liberalism
- Political position: Centre
- Colours: Green
- Council of Representatives: 15 / 329

Website
- alazm.party

The Azem Alliance (Arabic: تحالف عزم, romanized: Taḥāluf ʻAzm) is a political party in Iraq. It was founded by the Sunni Arab businessman Khamis al-Khanjar and includes prominent Sunni figures, such as former parliament speaker Salim al-Jabouri, and former defence minister Khaled al-Obaidi. It is currently headed by Muthanna al-Samarrai.

== Electoral results ==
The party won 14 seats in the 2021 parliamentary election.

Election	Leader	Votes	%	Seats	+/–	Position	Government
2021	Khamis al-Khanjar	421,579	4.76%	14 / 329	New	▲6th	Coalition
2025	Muthanna Al-Samarrai	483,737	4.31%	15 / 329	▲1	▼9th	Coalition
