= Ali al-Zaidi =

Prime Minister of Iraq since 2026

His Excellency Ali al-Zaidi
- علي الزيدي
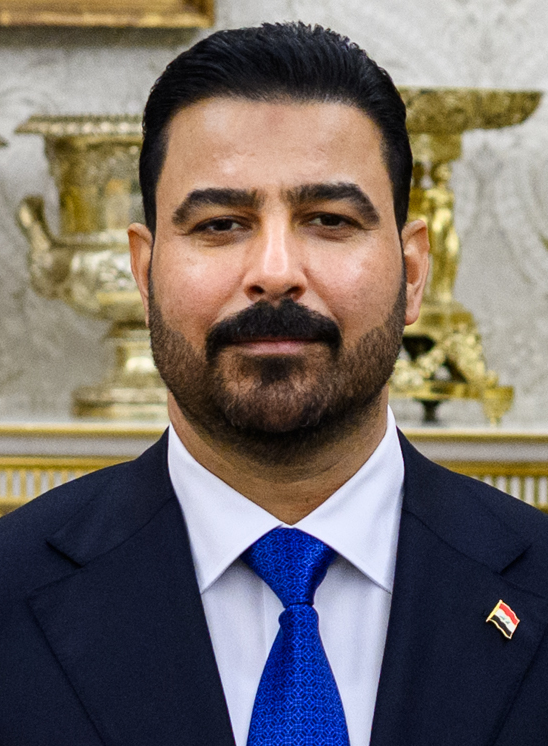
- al-Zaidi in 2026

Prime Minister of Iraq
- Incumbent
- Assumed office 14 May 2026
- President: Nizar Amidi
- Preceded by: Mohammed Shia' al-Sudani

Director of Iraqi National Intelligence Service
- Incumbent
- Assumed office 29 October 2026
- Prime Minister: Himself
- Preceded by: Hamid al-Shattri

Personal details
- Born: Ali Falih Kadhim al-Zaidi; 1 May 1985 (age 41) Baghdad, Iraq
- Party: Independent
- Other political affiliations: Coordination Framework
- Occupation: Banker; businessman; politician

Ali Falih Kadhim al-Zaidi (Arabic: علي فالح كاظم الزيدي, romanized: ʻAlī Fāliḥ Kāẓim az-Zaydī; born 1 May 1985) is an Iraqi banker, businessman, politician, and the current prime minister of Iraq since 2026. Taking office at the age of 41, he is the youngest prime minister in the history of Iraq. On 29 October 2026, Zaidi named himself the director of the Iraqi National Intelligence Service after dismissing the previous director.

== Early life and education ==
Al-Zaidi was born on 1 May 1985 (although some sources say 1983 or 1986) in Baghdad to a prominent Shia Muslim family which hails from the southern Iraqi governorate of Dhi Qar. He holds bachelor's degrees in law and finance as well as a master's degree in finance and banking. He is a member of the Iraqi Bar Association.

== Business career ==
Al-Zaidi was appointed chairman of Al-Watania Holding Group, a private multi-sector conglomerate founded in 2017. He also heads the board of directors at Al-Shaab University and the Ishtar Medical Institute, and is the CEO and owner of Dijlah TV. He owns the Taawon Hypermarket chain in Baghdad, and is also the owner of Al-Oways Group, a conglomerate that includes 15 companies operating in different industries such as food trade, agricultural and livestock production, contracting, printing, security services, electronics and oil; Al-Oways has contracts with the Iraqi Ministry of Trade.

Until his resignation in 2019, Al-Zaidi served as chairman of the board of directors for the Al-Janoob Islamic Bank, gaining experience in banking management and financial governance. According to The New York Times, the bank was sanctioned by the United States in 2024 over alleged money laundering on behalf of Iran and Iranian-backed Iraqi Shia militias, fraud, and the illicit use of US currency. The bank was also banned by the Central Bank of Iraq. According to an investigation conducted by the American financial crime assessment company K2 Integrity, no credible evidence was found linking al-Zaidi to Iran-linked financial activities. A source from within the company, speaking on condition of anonymity, emphasised that the previous restrictions imposed on al-Zaidi's bank were "for reasons of reputational risk rather than proven involvement in money laundering". On 18 July 2026, the US treasury announced that Al-Janoob Bank and six other previously blacklisted banks had been reinstated and cleared to use the US dollar, provided they complete a reform and relicensing program implemented by the Central Bank of Iraq.

== Political career ==
Al-Zaidi was not widely known in Iraq's political landscape prior to his nomination as prime minister–designate, with some sources describing him as a "political newcomer". In the public sector, al-Zaidi previously worked with the Ministry of Trade, where he managed the administration of the national ration card system.

=== Premiership ===
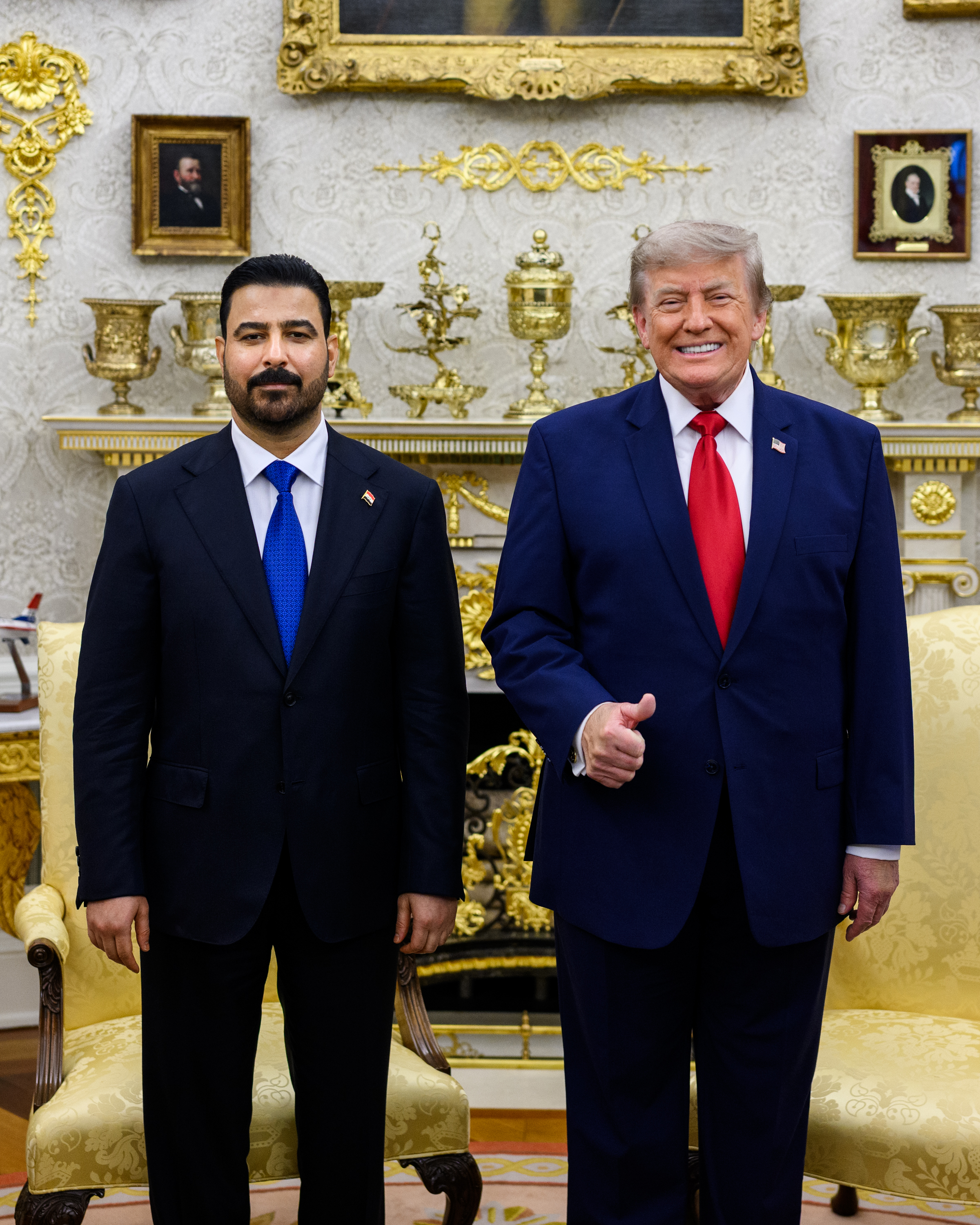
Al-Zaidi with United States president Donald Trump, 14 July 2026

On 27 April 2026, the Coordination Framework (CF) nominated al-Zaidi as a consensus candidate to succeed Mohammed Shia' al-Sudani. He was officially tasked by president Nizar Amidi to form a government immediately following his nomination by CF. Per the Constitution of Iraq, al-Zaidi has 30 days to select his cabinet members and present them to Iraq's Council of Representatives for a vote of confidence.

The decision to nominate al-Zaidi came after a weeks-long deadlock within the coalition, which had previously backed former prime minister Nouri al-Maliki but later withdrew his candidacy after US president Donald Trump threatened to cut off aid over al-Maliki's pro-Iranian stance. His nomination came after a meeting at the Baghdad residence of Falih Al-Fayyad, leader of the Popular Mobilization Forces, and was agreed upon by both al-Maliki and sitting prime minister al-Sudani. According to the latter, there was a "lack of consensus" on naming a candidate during the meeting, and al-Zaidi was chosen to break the political deadlock. Faiq Zaidan, the president of the Supreme Judicial Council, was involved in al-Zaidi's nomination as a settlement candidate.

In his first public statement since his nomination, al-Zaidi said that his government would expand on prior efforts to improve social services and conditions in Iraq, while assessing risks and capitalizing on opportunities. He also encouraged cooperation between the country's "political and social forces" amidst his appointment, and affirmed his intention to maintain balanced diplomatic relations both regionally and internationally.

On 29 April 2026, the US embassy in Iraq welcomed the nomination of al-Zaidi, stating: "The US Mission in Iraq extends its best wishes to Prime Minister–designate Ali al-Zaidi as he works to form a government capable of fulfilling the aspirations of all Iraqis for a brighter and more peaceful future."

Al-Zaidi was officially sworn in during a parliamentary session held on 14 May 2026, with partial parliamentary approval given to his cabinet. Fourteen ministerial posts were approved, but nine others – among them those of defense and the interior – remained vacant due to lack of consensus at the time. During the session, a scuffle broke out between some of the MPs, while others (such as Qais al-Khazali and Bafel Talabani) were reportedly celebrating together. This prompted the speaker of the parliament to adjourn the session.

As conflict between the US, Israel, and Iran raged in 2026, Trump administration officials ramped up pressure on the Iraqi government to rein in Iran-backed Shiite militias operating in the country. These militias rose to prominence as part of the Popular Mobilization Forces that battled ISIS in the 2010s. Many came under the authority of the Iraqi government as part of a deal brokered in 2019, but integration came slowly and unevenly. In 2025 and 2026, amid ongoing conflicts in the Levant, some Iran-backed militias in Iraq like the Guardians of the Blood Brigade and Kataib Hezbollah began orchestrating attacks on US interests in the region. On 15 June 2026, al-Zaidi issued a joint statement with US Special Envoy for Iraq Tom Barrack outlining "plans for ensuring the complete disarmament and disbandment of all armed groups and formations operating outside the authority and control of the Iraqi state". Al-Zaidi achieved some success in integrating Muqtada al-Sadr's Peace Brigades into the security forces, but faced stiff resistance from other militias demanding guarantees of Iraqi sovereignty and limits to US influence in the region. Renad Mansour, an expert on Iraq for Chatham House, described the Prime Minister's efforts as "a veneer of going after the militias".

On 28 June 2026, Al-Zaidi ordered Iraqi special forces to raid Baghdad's Green Zone and arrest at least 47 government officials as part of a targeted anti-corruption campaign. Among those detained was Ali Maarij, Iraq's deputy oil minister for distribution affairs. Maarij had been sanctioned by the US in May 2026 due to accusations of diverting oil to support Iran and Iranian-backed militias.

On 13 July, Al-Zaidi headed a large delegation on his first international visit to the United States and met with President Donald Trump on 14 July. Trump praised the new Prime Minister describing him as "a fantastic champion, a new champion". On 23 July, al-Zaidi led a delegation of Iraqi officials to Tehran, where they visited Iranian president Masoud Pezeshkian, parliamentary speaker Mohammad Bagher Ghalibaf, and foreign minister Abbas Araghchi. They signed several agreements and established a Joint Economic Committee between Iraq and Iran. Al-Zaidi reportedly delivered a ceasefire proposal from Trump to the Iranian government during the meeting. However, this was rejected.

In July 2026, Ali al-Zaidi promised to make the return of Christian families to Iraq a priority, describing the Christian community as "an essential part of Iraqi society".

Al-Zaidi faced pressure to abandon his campaign to disarm Iraqi militias. There were multiple attempts by both the militias and the wider Coordination Framework coalition to either only commence a symbolic disarmament, or otherwise push the deadline to 2027 or 2028.

On 30 September, after the US military withdrew from Iraq with the end of Operation Inherent Resolve, al-Zaidi designated 1 October as Iraq's Sovereignty Day. The withdrawal was in line with his efforts to assert state control, and according to Douglas Silliman, helped politically weaken the militias that his government is trying to disarm, many of which used the US presence in Iraq to justify their activities.

On 1 October, Kataib Sayyid al-Shuhada and Harakat Ansar Allah al-Awfiya, both members of Islamic Resistance in Iraq, confirmed their commitment to disarmament.

On 28 October, al-Zaidi visited Syrian president Ahmed al-Sharaa in Damascus, where they discussed economic cooperation and the export of Iraqi oil through the defunct Kirkuk–Baniyas pipeline. This was the first visit by an Iraqi prime minister to Syria since the fall of the Assad regime. He also donated $10 million to the Umayyad and Sayyida Zainab mosques.

On 19 November, al-Zaidi reached an agreement with Kata'ib Hezbollah to establish a joint operations center in Jurf al-Sakhar, a stronghold of the militia, after the government accused the group of smuggling oil there. The following day, Iraqi security forces deployed to the area.

== See also ==
- List of current heads of state and government
- List of heads of the executive by approval rating
