= State of Law Coalition =

State of Law Coalition إئتلاف دولة القانون
- Leader: Nouri al-Maliki
- Founded: 2009; 17 years ago
- Ideology: Shia Islamism; Khomeinism; Authoritarianism; Anti-secularism; Statism
- Political position: Syncretic
- Religion: Shia Islam
- National affiliation: National Iraqi Alliance
- International affiliation: Axis of Resistance
- Colours: Green
- Council of Representatives: 29 / 329
- Seats in the Governorate Councils: 126 / 440
- Governors: 5 / 18

Website
- state-of-law.com

The State of Law Coalition (Arabic: إئتلاف دولة القانون I'tilāf Dawlat al-Qānūn), also known as Rule of Law Coalition, is an Iraqi political coalition formed for the 2009 Iraqi governorate elections by the Prime Minister of Iraq at the time, Nouri al-Maliki, of the Islamic Dawa Party.

The name was an emphasis on the improved security situation which Maliki's government had achieved through the Battle of Basra and other operations of the Iraqi Security Forces.

Due to disagreements with the Islamic Supreme Council of Iraq and the Sadrists, the Dawa Party decided not to join the Iraqi National Alliance for the 2010 Iraqi parliamentary election, but run in their own coalition: the State of Law Coalition.

== 2009 governorate elections ==
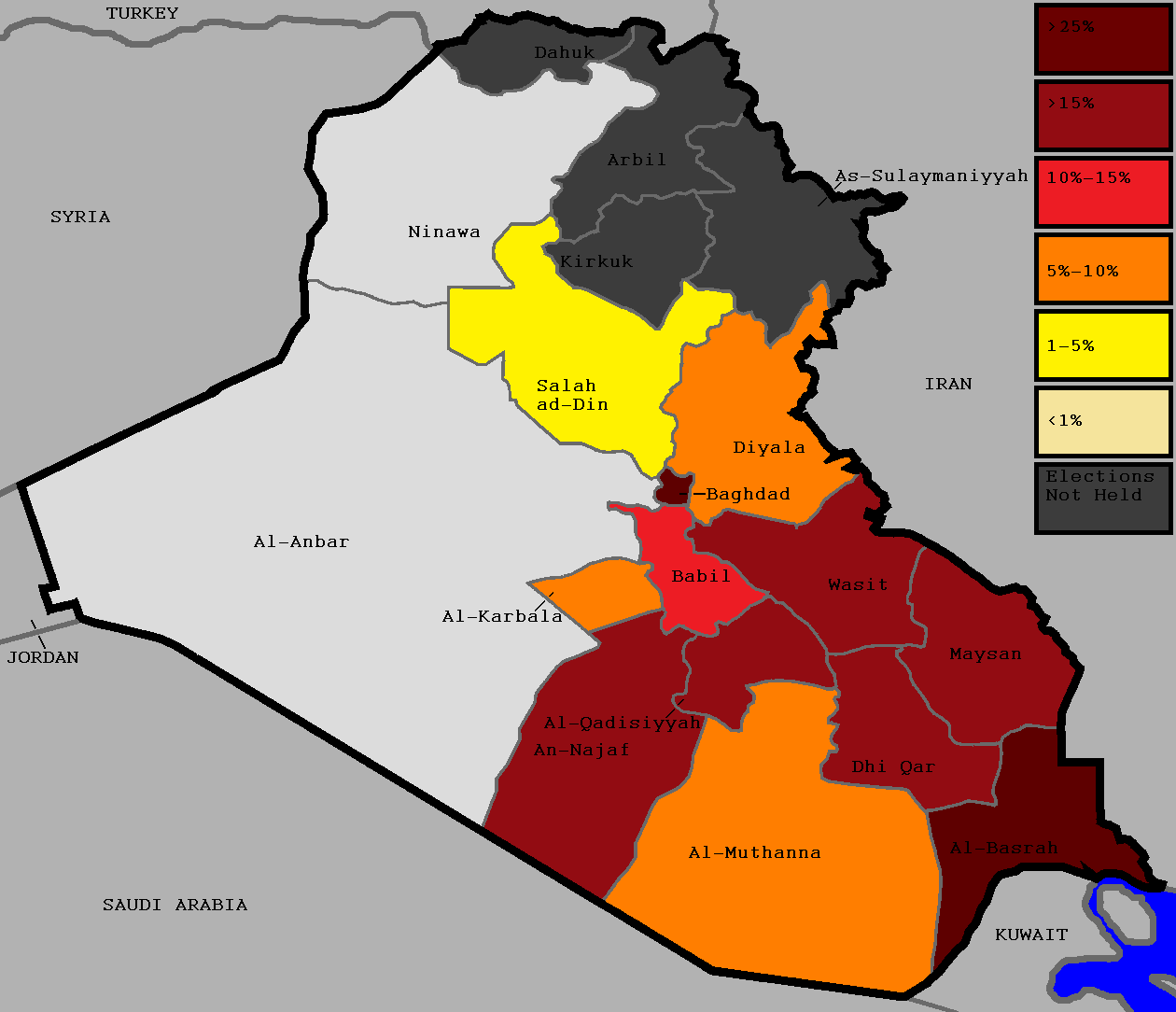
Percentage of votes for the State of Law Coalition in each governorate in 2009

In the 2009 Iraqi governorate elections, the State of Law Coalition was composed of several political blocs:

- Islamic Dawa Party – led by Iraqi Prime Minister Nouri al-Maliki
- Islamic Dawa Party – Iraq Organisation – led by Hashim Al-Mosawy
- Independent Bloc – led by Iraqi Oil Minister Hussain al-Shahristani
- Solidarity Bloc – led by former minister of state and Iraqi MP Qassim Daoud
- Islamic Union of Iraqi Turkoman – led by Iraqi MP Abbas al-Bayati
- Kurdish Feyli Fraternity Movement
- Shaabani Uprising Bloc 1991
- Independents, there were also numerous independent candidates in the list.

=== Results ===
The State of Law Coalition came out as the largest list receiving 19.1% of the vote and 126 out of 440 seats.

Governorate	Percentage	Seats Won	Total Seats
al-Anbar	-	0	29
Babil	12.5%	8	30
Baghdad	38%	28	57
Basra	37%	20	35
Dhi Qar	23.1%	13	31
Diyala	6%	2	29
Karbala	8.5%	9	27
Maysan	17.7%	8	27
al-Muthanna	10.9%	5	26
Najaf	16.2%	7	28
Ninawa	-	0	37
al-Qadisiyyah	23.1%	11	28
Salah ad-Din	3.5%	2	28
Wasit	15.3%	13	28
Total:	28.8%	126	440

== 2010 parliamentary election ==
In the 2010 Iraqi parliamentary election, the following parties were part of the State of Law Coalition:

- Islamic Dawa Party – led by Iraqi Prime Minister Nouri al-Maliki
- Islamic Dawa Party – Iraq Organisation – led by Hashim Al-Mosawy
- Anbar Salvation National Front – led by Sheikh Ali Hatem al-Suleiman
- Independent Arab Movement – led by former Deputy Prime Minister Abid Mutlak al-Jubouri
- United Independent Iraqi Bloc – led by Thaer al-Feyli
- Independent Iraqi Kafaat Gathering – led by government spokesman Ali al-Dabbagh
- The Gathering—Al-Tajamo – led by former Iraqi National List members Mahdi al-Hafez and Safiyah Suheil
- Islamic Union of Iraqi Turkoman – led by Abbas al-Bayati
- "The Independents" led by Iraqi Oil Minister Hussain al-Shahristani
- Independents, there were again numerous independent candidates in the list initially including defence minister Qadir al-Obeidi but he was banned from joining due to Ba'ath party links.

=== Results ===
Governorate	Votes	Seats Won	Total Seats
Anbar	6,156	0	14
Babil	231,939	8	16
Baghdad	903,360	26	68
Basra	431,217	14	24
Dhi Qar	235,446	8	18
Diyala	63,969	1	13
Karbala	179,517	6	10
Kirkuk	11,862	0	12
Maysan	102,566	4	10
Muthanna	98,998	4	7
Najaf	197,377	7	12
Ninawa	15,755	0	31
Qadisiyyah	133,067	4	11
Salah ad-Din	31,026	0	12
Wasit	149,828	5	11
Compensatory seats	-	2	7
Total:	2,792,083	89	325

== 2013 governorate elections ==
In the 2013 Iraqi governorate elections, the State of Law Coalition was composed of several political blocs:

- Islamic Dawa Party – led by Iraqi Prime Minister Nouri al-Maliki
- Islamic Dawa Party – Iraq Organisation
- Independent Bloc – led by Iraqi Oil Minister Hussain al-Shahristani
- Badr Organization – led by Hadi Al-Amiri
- National Reform Trend – led by former Iraqi Prime Minister Ibrahim al-Jaafari
- Islamic Virtue Party – led by Abd al-Rahim al-Hasini
- Solidarity Bloc – led by former minister of state and Iraqi MP Qassim Daoud
- Islamic Union of Iraqi Turkoman – led by Iraqi MP Abbas al-Bayati
- White Iraqiya Bloc – led by Hassan Alawi
- Kurdish Feyli Fraternity Movement
- Shaabani Uprising Bloc 1991
- Independents, there were also numerous independent candidates in the list.

== Election results ==
Election year	Leader	Votes	%	Seats	+/–	Position
2010	Nouri al-Maliki	2,792,083	24.22	89 / 325	New	▲2nd
2014	Nouri al-Maliki	3,141,835	24.14	92 / 328	▲3	▲1st
2018	Nouri al-Maliki	725,108	6.98	25 / 329	▼67	▼5th
2021	Nouri al-Maliki	502,188	5.67	33 / 329	▲8	▲4th
2025	Nouri al-Maliki	728,446	6.49	29 / 329	▼4	4th

== See also ==
- List of Islamic political parties
