= Council of Representatives (Iraq) =

Legislature of Iraq

Council of Representatives مجلس النواب (Arabic) ئه‌نجومه‌نی نوێنه‌ران (Kurdish)
- Seal of the Council of Representatives of Iraq

Type
- Type: Unicameral (de facto); Bicameral (de jure)

History
- Founded: 28 December 2005; 20 years ago
- Preceded by: Senate of Iraq; Chamber of Deputies of Iraq; National Assembly of Ba'athist Iraq

Leadership
- Speaker: Haibat al-Halbousi, Takadum since 29 December 2025
- First Deputy Speaker: Adnan Fayhan, Al Sadiqoun since 29 December 2025
- Second Deputy Speaker: Farhad al-Atroushi, KDP since 29 December 2025

Structure
- Seats: 329
- Political groups: State Administration Assembly (243) Cabinet (205): RDC (46); State of Law (29); Al Sadiqoun (27); Takadum (27); KDP (26); Badr Organisation (18); PUK (15); Azem Alliance (15); Babylon Movement (2); Non-Cabinet (35): Alliance of Nation State Forces (18); Al-Asas (8); Tasmim Alliance (6); Huqouq Movement (6); Opposition (75): Al-Siyadah (8); Ishraqat Kanoon (8); Others (59)
- Length of term: 4 years

Elections
- Voting system: Proportional representation with modified Sainte-Laguë method
- First election: 30 January 2005
- Last election: 11 November 2025
- Next election: By 2029
- Redistricting: Independent High Electoral Commission

Meeting place
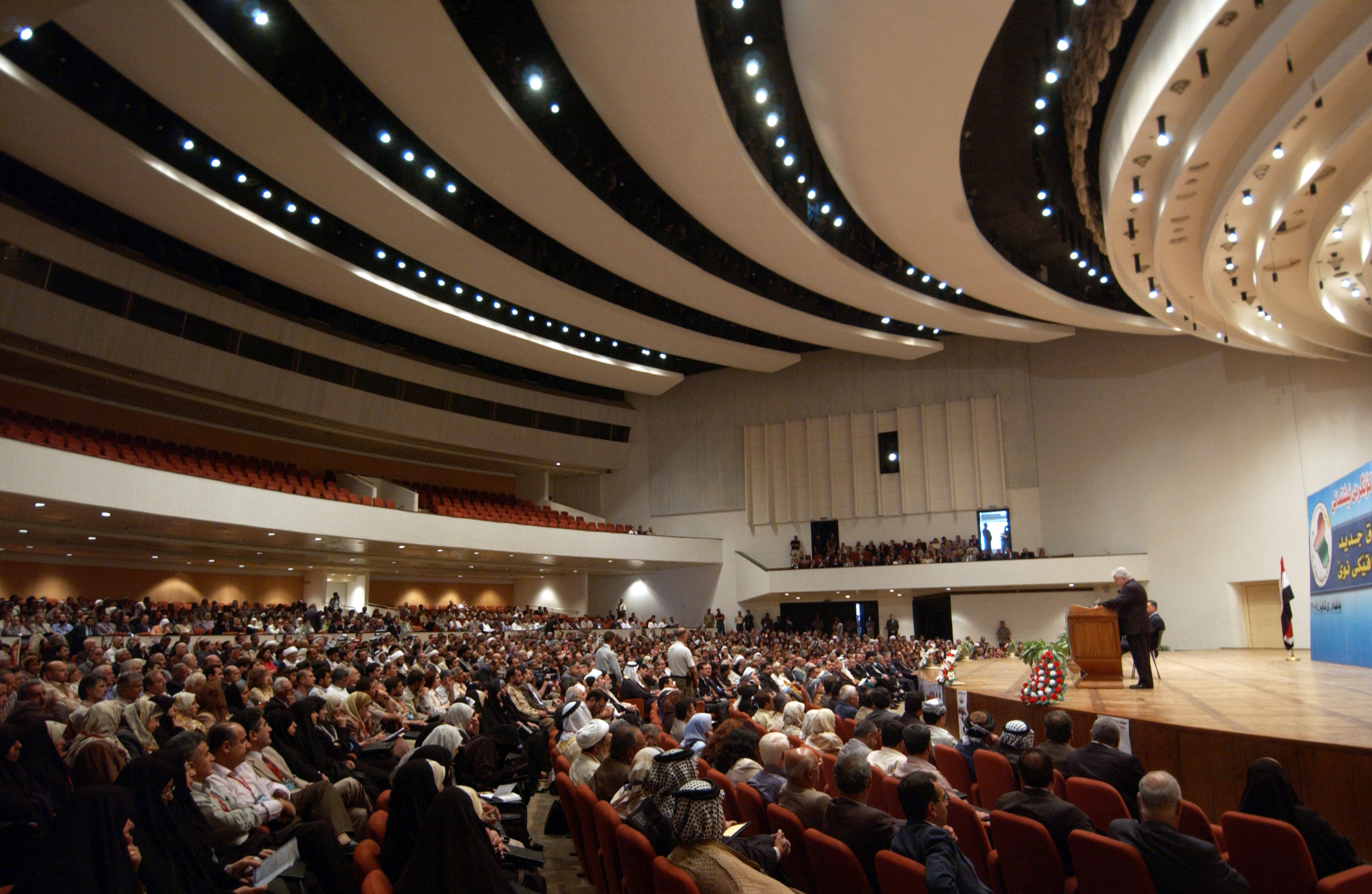
- Baghdad Convention Center; Green Zone; Baghdad; Iraq

Website
- parliament.iq

Constitution
- Constitution of Iraq (2005), Section II, Chapter I

The Council of Representatives (Note: Arabic: مجلس النواب, romanized: Majlis an-Nuwwāb al-ʿIrāqiyy; Kurdish: ئه‌نجومه‌نی نوێنه‌ران, Encûmena Nûnerên Iraqê, usually referred to simply as the Parliament (Arabic: البرلمان)) is the de facto unicameral legislature of Iraq. According to the constitution of Iraq, it is the lower house of the bicameral legislature of the country. The Federation Council is the unconvened de jure upper house.

As of 2020, the Council of Representatives comprises 329 seats and meets in Baghdad inside the Green Zone.

== Electoral system ==
For the 2025 parliamentary elections, members are elected by proportional representation, with seats allocated using the modified Webster/Sainte-Laguë method with a divisor of 1.7, in 18 constituencies corresponding to Iraq's governorates. 83 seats are reserved for women, 9 seats are reserved for minorities (five for Christians and one each for Yazidis, Shabaks, Mandaeans and Feyli Kurds).

== History ==
An elected Iraqi parliament first formed following the establishment of a constitutional monarchy in 1925. The 1925 constitution called for a bicameral parliament whose lower house, the Chamber of Deputies of Iraq or Council of Representatives (Majlis an-Nuwwab) would be elected based on universal manhood suffrage. The upper house, the Senate of Iraq (Majlis al-A`yan) was appointed by the king. Sixteen elections took place between 1925 and the coup of 1958.

On January 1953, elections for the Chamber of Deputies, also known as the National Assembly, took place. Following controversy over the implementation of the Baghdad Pact, Prime Minister Nuri Pasha as-Said called for elections the following year, in early 1954. As-Said dissolved the assembly shortly thereafter and began to rule by decree, but the opposition forced him to hold a third election within three years. The second 1954 election was regarded as a sham election, with as-Said's political enemies banned from running alongside widespread voter coercion. The assembly was suspended yet again, and in 1958 a military coup deposed as-Said and the monarchy, and dissolved parliament.

The 1970 constitution created a republic with an elected National Assembly (al-Majlis al-Watani). However, elections for the Assembly did not take place until June 1980, under Iraq's at the time new military president, Saddam Hussein. Several more elections took place between 1989 and 2003. Elections for its members were not considered free and fair by the international community. Only members of Hussein's Ba'ath Party were ever elected.

In 2003, the Ba'athist regime was forcibly removed from power by the United States of America, the United Kingdom and their allies during the Iraq War. In March 2003 a governing council set up by the Coalition Provisional Authority signed an interim constitution which called for the election of a transitional National Assembly after than the end of January 2005. This Assembly would draft a permanent constitution which would then be submitted to approval by the Iraqi people in a general referendum.

Elections for this transitional National Assembly (al-Jam`iyya al-Wataniyya) took place on January 30, 2005. The United Iraqi Alliance Party won the majority of seats with 48% of the popular vote resulting in 140 seats. Eighty-five members of the assembly were women.

Talks between the UIA and other parties to form a coalition government began soon after the election. The assembly had its first meeting on March 16, 2005. After weeks of negotiations between the dominant political parties, on April 4, 2005, Sunni Arab Hajim al-Hassani was chosen as speaker; Shiite Hussain Shahristani and Kurd Aref Taifour were elected as his top deputies. The Assembly elected Jalal Talabani to head the Presidency Council on April 6, and approved the selection of Ibrahim al-Jaafari and his cabinet on April 28.

== Elections among the Constitution of 2005 ==
Under the permanent constitution approved on October 15, 2005, legislative authority is vested in two bodies, the Council of Representatives and the Federation Council, while the latter is to be established by the former.

=== Council of Representatives ===
The Council of Representatives consists of 325 members elected for four years, with two sessions in each annual term. The Council passes federal laws, oversees the executive, ratifies treaties, and approves nominations of specified officials. It elects the president of the republic, who selects a prime minister from the majority coalition in the Council. (During an initial period, a three-member Presidential Council elected by the Council of Representatives will carry out the duties of the president of the republic.)

Elections were held on December 15, 2005 for the Council of Representatives. The Council first met on March 16, 2006, exactly one year after the first meeting of the transitional assembly.

=== Federation Council ===
The Federation Council (or Council of Federation/Union) would consist of representatives from Iraq's regions and governorates. Its precise composition and responsibilities are not defined in the constitution and will be determined by the Council of Representatives. As of 2025, no concrete steps have been made towards establishing the proposed upper house.

== Incidents ==
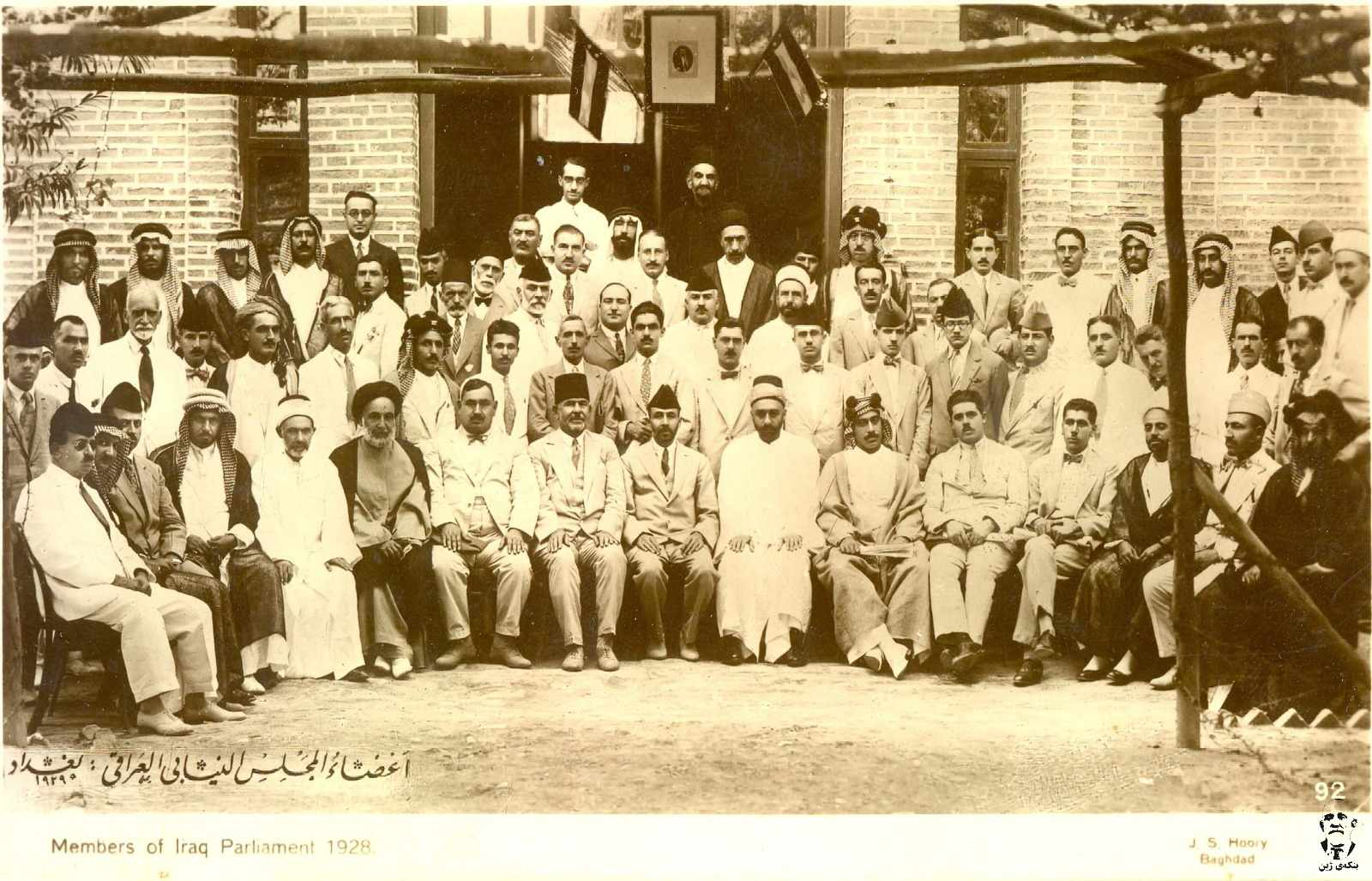
Iraqi parliament members in 1928.

=== 2007 Iraqi Parliament bombing ===
On April 12, 2007, Mohammed Awad, a member of the Iraqi National Dialogue Council, was killed at the Baghdad Convention Center cafeteria, where the Council of Representatives meets, alongside wounding 22 others, in the 2007 Iraqi Parliament bombing.

=== 2007 issues ===
A group of Sunni lawmakers boycotted parliament in a June 2007 protest of the removal of the speaker, Mahmoud al-Mashhadani, after a series of controversial actions. They returned in July after the speaker was re-instated with the understanding that he would quietly resign after a few sessions. A group of Shiite members also returned in July after a boycott which gained them an investigation into the bombing of a Shiite mosque, along with reconstruction and improved security. The parliament was under pressure from the United States to pass legislation dealing with members of the Baath party, distribution of oil revenues, regional autonomy, and constitutional reform, by September 2007.

=== 2009 electoral reform ===
The Iraqi cabinet approved a draft elections law in September 2009. However, it took two months and ten delays for the law to pass in the Council of Representatives. The main areas of dispute concerned the "open list" electoral system and the voters roll in Kirkuk Governorate, which Arab and Turkmen parties alleged had been manipulated by the Kurdistan Regional Government of Iraq.

UNAMI advised the electoral system was changed to allow people to vote for individuals as well as party lists under the open list form of proportional representation. The last national elections had used a closed list system, but the Iraqi governorate elections of 2009 had used open lists. In the end, all parties except for the Kurdistani Alliance agreed to support open lists which was adopted. The law increased the size of the Council from 275 to 325 members—equal to one seat per 100,000 citizens, as specified in the Constitution of Iraq.

=== 2016 protests ===
The parliament was stormed by protesters in April 2016; the protestors also attacked buildings within the parliamentary complex.

=== 2018 electoral reform ===
The Council of Representatives voted on 11 February 2018, to add an extra seat for minorities, in the Wasit Governorate for Feyli Kurds, making the total number of parliamentarians equal to 329 prior to the 2018 parliamentary elections.

=== 2019 electoral reform ===
As a result of the ongoing 2019 Iraqi protests, the Council of Representatives approved a new law on 24 December 2019 which aims to make it easier for independent politicians to win a seat in the Council of Representatives. The new law will see each of Iraq's governorates split into several electoral districts, with one legislator being elected per 100,000 people, thus replacing its proportional representation system for a district-based system. The new law will also prevent parties from running on unified lists.

=== 2021 elections ===
Since the parliamentary election in October 2021, there has been a political crisis in Iraq, with members of the Council of Representatives of Iraq being unable to form a stable coalition government, or elect a new President. For 10 months, the national political system was in a political deadlock. On 3 August 2022, Muqtada al-Sadr called for snap elections.

=== 2025 elections ===
On 11 November 2025, more than 100 political parties and 7,744 candidates competed in the elections to enter the 329-seat Iraqi Parliament, with a 56% election turnout indicating rising stability. The three largest parties (in terms of vote count) were RDC, KDP and Taqaddum. Al-Sudani's 46-seat lead with Shiite parties winning the majority of seats. However, seat allocation did not reflect this, with State of Law receiving more seats than KDP and Al-Sadiqoun receiving the same amount of seats with Taqaddum due to the modified voting system.

== Historical composition ==
DPAK / Kurd. List / Nat'l List / Nat'l Movement / Iraqi List / Iraqi Accord Front / SoL / Nat'l Alliance / Nat'l Dialogue / Others
01/2005	75 / 40 / 140 / 20
12/2005	53 / 25 / 44 / 128 / 11 / 14
2010	43 / 91 / 89 / 70 / 32

PUK / KDP / Watan. / Mutt. / Vict. / Muw. / NWM / Arab. / SoL / Fatah / Sadr. / Saair. / Others
2014	19 / 19 / 21 / 23 / 29 / 10 / 92 / 28 / 88
2018	18 / 25 / 21 / 42 / 19 / 25 / 48 / 54 / 77

Kurd. / PUK / KDP / Prog. / R&D / NSF / Azem / SoL / Fatah / Sadr. / Sadiq. / Badr. / Others / Indep.
2021	17 / 31 / 37 / 14 / 33 / 17 / 73 / 43 / 64
2025	15 / 26 / 27 / 46 / 18 / 15 / 29 / 27 / 18 / 108

== See also ==
- Politics of Iraq
- Elections in Iraq
- List of legislatures by country
