= 2009 Najaf governorate election =

2009 Najaf Governorate election
- 31 January 2009

All 28 seats for the Najaf Governorate council
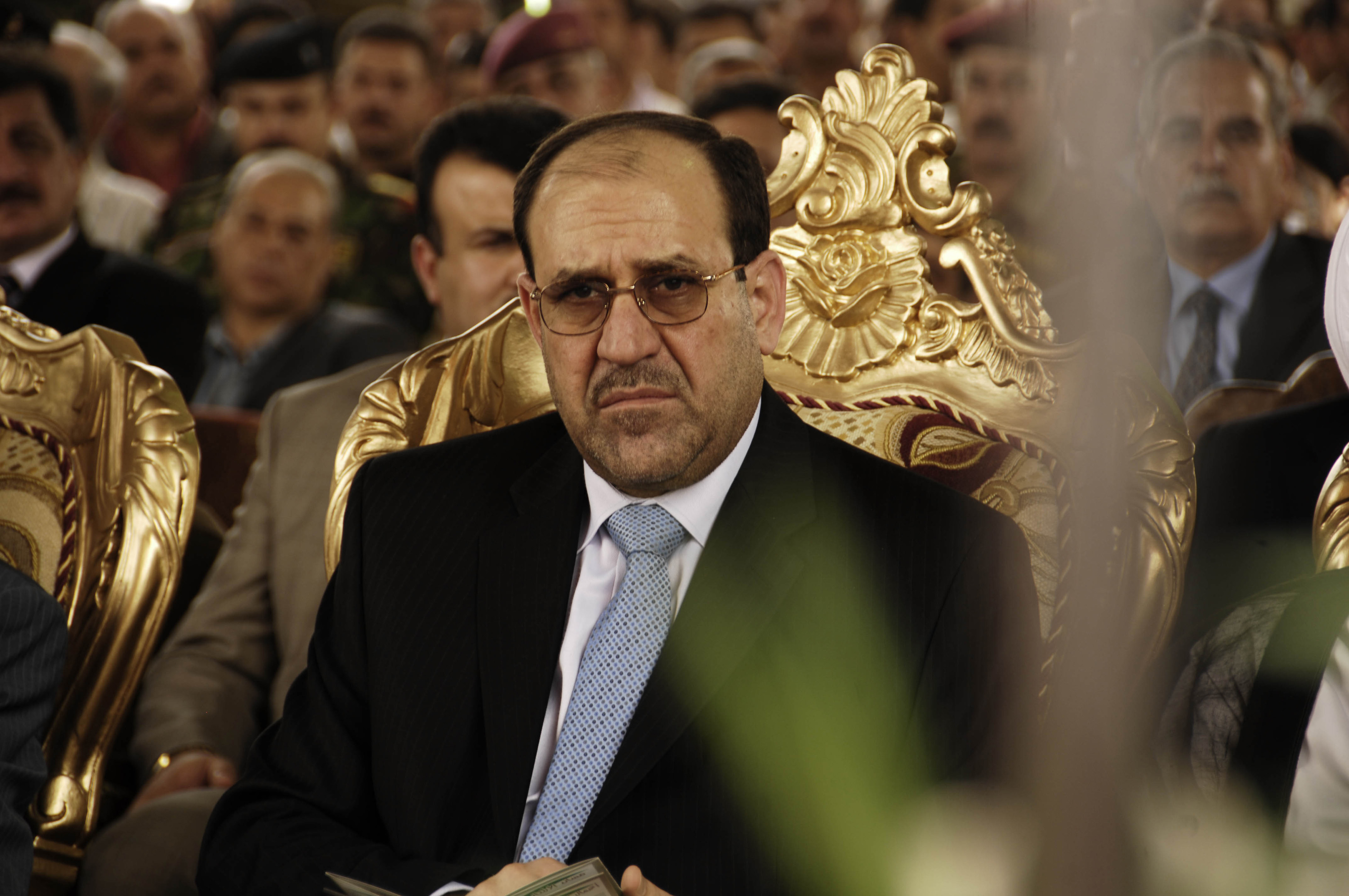

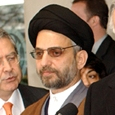
	First party	Second party
Leader	Nouri al-Maliki	Abdul Aziz al-Hakim
Party	State of Law	Al-Mehraab Martyr List
Last election	0	19
Seats before	0	19
Seats won	7	7
Seat change	▲7	▼12
Popular vote	54,907	50,146
Percentage	16.22%	14.81%
Swing	▲16.22%	▼22.4%
	Third party	Fourth party
Leader	Muqtada al-Sadr	Adnan al-Zurufi
Party	Sadrist Movement	Loyalty for Najaf
Last election	0	9
Seats before	0	9
Seats won	6	4
Seat change	▲6	▼5
Popular vote	40,186	30,219
Percentage	11.87%	8.93%
Swing	▲11.87%	▼9.12%
Governor of Najaf before election
Asad Abu Gilel al-Taie
ISCI
Subsequent Governor
Adnan al-Zurufi
Loyalty for Najaf

The Najaf governorate election of 2009 was held on 31 January 2009 alongside elections for all other governorates outside Iraqi Kurdistan and Kirkuk.

== Results ==
Summary of the 31 January 2009 Najaf governorate election results
Coalition 2005/2009	Allied national parties	Leader	Seats (2005)	Seats (2009)	Change	Votes
State of Law Coalition	Islamic Dawa Party	Nouri Al-Maliki	–	7	+7	54,907
Al Mihrab Martyr List	ISCI	Abdul Aziz al-Hakim	19	7	-12	50,146
Independent Free Movement List	Sadrist Movement	Muqtada al-Sadr	–	6	+6	40,186
Loyalty for Najaf		Adnan al-Zurufi	9	4	-5	30,219
National Reform Trend	National Reform Trend	Ibrahim al-Jaafari	–	2	+2	23,377
Independent Najaf Union			–	2	+2	12,766
Iraqi National List	Iraqi National Accord		3	–	-3	6,640
Islamic Virtue Party	Islamic Vertue Party	Abdelrahim Al-Husseini	2	–	-2	5,341
Banner of the Independents			4	–	-4	
Allegiance Coalition			2	–	-2	
Iraq Future Gathering			2	–	-2	
Other Parties						
Total			41	28	-13	338,540
Sources: this article – al Sumaria – New York Times -
