= 2009 Al-Qādisiyyah governorate election =

2009 Al-Qādisiyyah Governorate election
| ← 2005 | 31 January 2009 | 2013 → |

All 28 seats for the Al-Qādisiyyah Governorate council
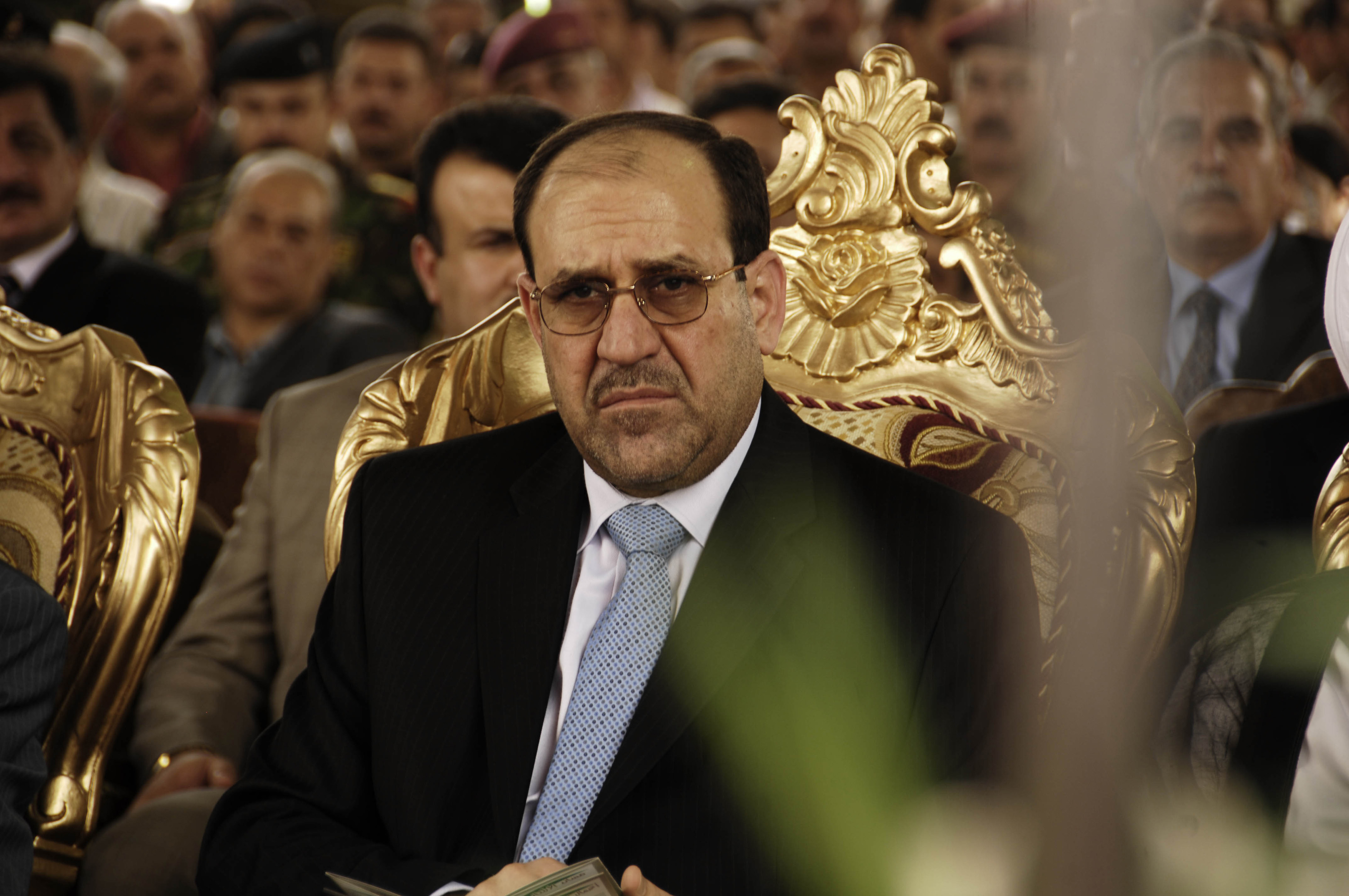

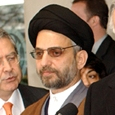

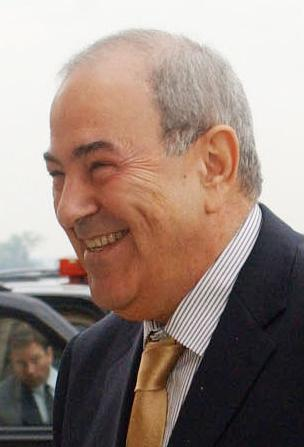

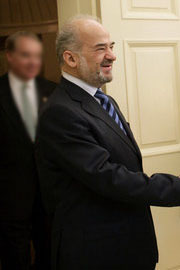
| | First party | Second party |
|---|---|---|
| Leader | Nouri al-Maliki | Abdul Aziz al-Hakim |
| Party | State of Law | Al-Mehraab Martyr List |
| Last election | 5 | 20 |
| Seats before | 5 | 20 |
| Seats won | 11 | 5 |
| Seat change | ▲6 | ▼15 |
| Popular vote | 78,276 | 38,972 |
| Percentage | 22.56% | 11.72% |
| Swing | ▲14.76% | ▼18.52% |
| | Third party | Fourth party |
| Leader | Ayad Allawi | Ibrahim al-Jaafari |
| Party | INL | National Reform Trend |
| Last election | 3 | 0 |
| Seats before | 3 | 0 |
| Seats won | 3 | 3 |
| Seat change | No change | ▲3 |
| Popular vote | 27,687 | 26,738 |
| Percentage | 8.36% | 8.05% |
| Swing | ▲3.79% | ▲8.05% |
Governor of Al-Qādisiyyah before election
Hamid al-Khodari
ISCI
Subsequent Governor
Salim Husayn
State of Law

The Al-Qādisiyyah governorate election of 2009 was held on 31 January 2009 alongside elections for all other governorates outside Iraqi Kurdistan and Kirkuk.

== Results ==
Summary of the 31 January 2009 Al-Qādisiyyah governorate election results
| Coalition | Allied national parties | Seats (2005) | Seats (2009) | Change | Votes |
|---|---|---|---|---|---|
| State of Law Coalition / IDP | Islamic Dawa Party; Islamic Dawa Party – Iraq Organisation | 5 | 11 | ▲6 | 78,276 |
| Al Mihrab Martyr List / Martyr of the Sanctuary Sayyid Muhammad Baqir al-Hakim | Islamic Supreme Council of Iraq | 20 | 5 | ▼15 | 38,972 |
| Iraqi National List | | 3 | 3 | – | 27,687 |
| National Reform Trend | | – | 3 | ▲3 | 26,738 |
| Independent Free Movement List | Sadrist Movement | 3 | 2 | ▼1 | 21,742 |
| Islamic Loyalty Party | Sadrist Movement | 2 | 2 | – | 14,054 |
| Islamic Virtue Party | | 3 | 2 | ▼1 | 13,596 |
| Shiite Political Council | | 5 | – | ▼5 | |
| Total | | 41 | 28 | ▼13 | 332,176 |
Sources: this article -
