= 2009 Dhi Qar governorate election =

Iraqi local election

2009 Dhi Qar Governorate election
← 2005	31 January 2009	2013 →

All 31 seats for the Dhi Qar Governorate council
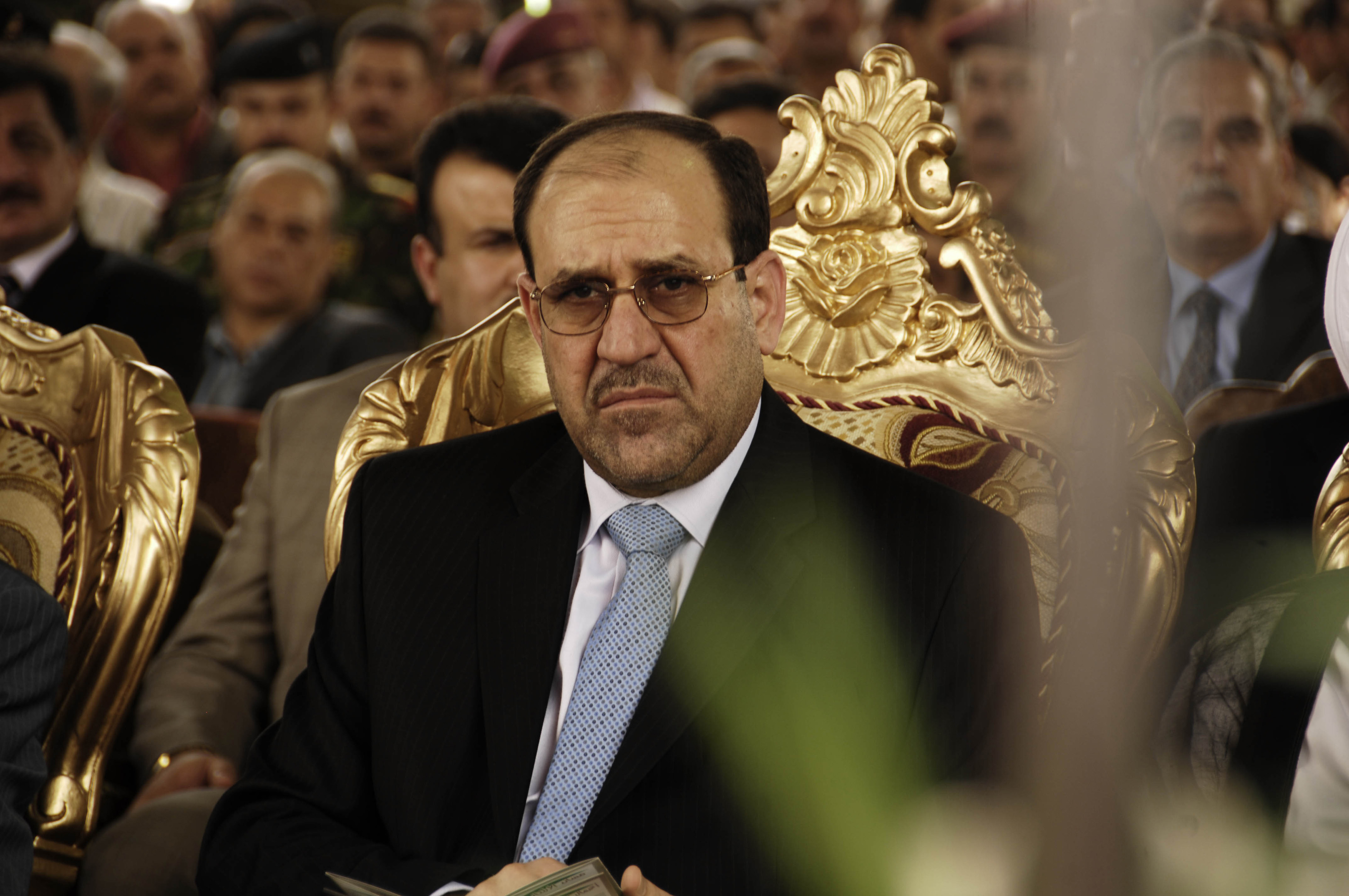

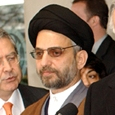

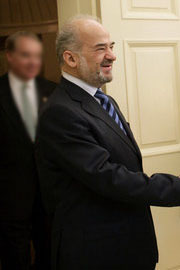
	First party	Second party
Leader	Nouri al-Maliki	Muqtada al-Sadr
Party	State of Law	Sadrist Movement
Last election	0	2
Seats before	0	2
Seats won	13	7
Seat change	▲13	▲5
Popular vote	107,410	61,929
Percentage	23.7	13.6%
Swing	▲	▲
	Third party	Fourth party
Leader	Abdul Aziz al-Hakim	Ibrahim al-Jaafari
Party	Al-Mehraab Martyr List	National Reform Trend
Last election	11	0
Seats before	11	0
Seats won	5	4
Seat change	▼6	▲4
Popular vote	51,463	34,255
Percentage	11.3%	7.5%
Swing	▼	▲7.5%
Governor of Baghdad before election
Aziz Kadum Alwan al-Ogheli
ISCI
Subsequent Governor
Taleb Kazem Abdulkarim al-Hassan
State of Law

The Dhi Qar governorate election of 2009 was held on 31 January 2009 alongside elections for all other governorates outside Iraqi Kurdistan and Kirkuk.

== Results ==
Party	Votes	%	Seats	+/–
State of Law Coalition	107,410	23.67	13	+13
Sadrist Movement	61,929	13.65	7	+5
Al Mihrab Martyr List	51,463	11.34	5	−6
National Reform Trend	34,255	7.55	4	+4
Islamic Virtue Party	27,138	5.98	2	−9
Iraqi National List	12,924	2.85	0	−2
Iraqi Communist Party	8,272	1.82	0	−2
Other parties	150,415	33.15	–	–
Total	453,806	100.00	31	−10
Source: Niqash, Al Sumaria, New York Times
