= 2009 Babil governorate election =

2009 Babil Governorate election
| ← 2005 | 31 January 2009 | 2013 → |

All 30 seats for the Babil Governorate council
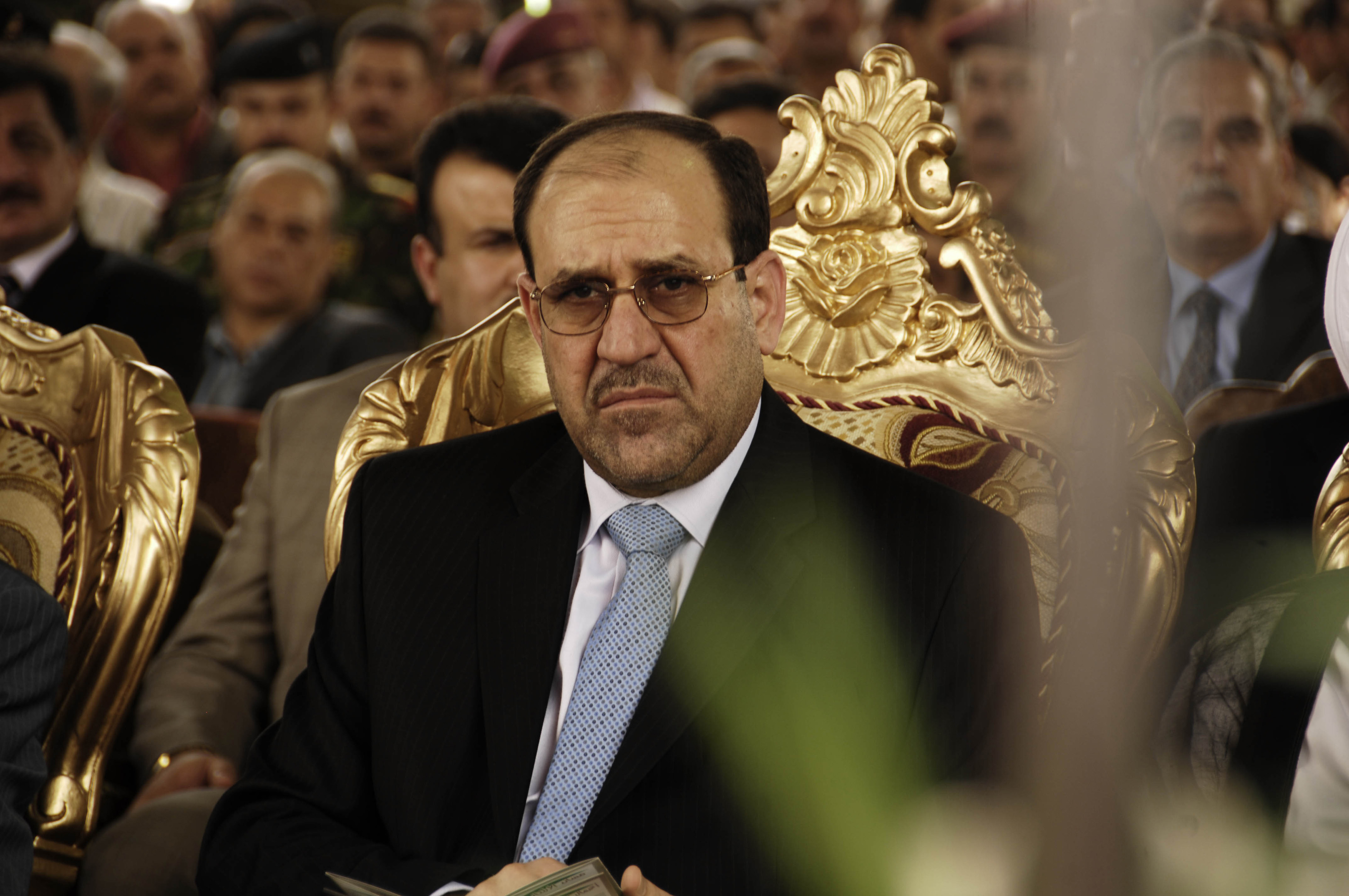

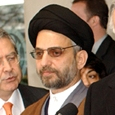

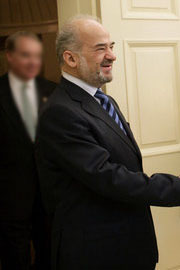
| | First party | Second party |
|---|---|---|
| Leader | Nouri al-Maliki | Abdul Aziz al-Hakim |
| Party | State of Law | Al-Mehraab Martyr List |
| Last election | 0 | 0 |
| Seats before | 0 | 25 |
| Seats won | 8 | 5 |
| Seat change | ▲8 | ▼20 |
| Popular vote | 60,914 | 40,365 |
| Percentage | 12.5% | 8.3% |
| Swing | ▲12.5% | ▼30.7% |
| | Third party | Fourth party |
| Leader | Muqtada al-Sadr | Ibrahim al-Jaafari |
| Party | Sadrist Movement | National Reform Trend |
| Last election | 6 | 0 |
| Seats before | 6 | 0 |
| Seats won | 3 | 3 |
| Seat change | ▼3 | ▲3 |
| Popular vote | 30,119 | 21,055 |
| Percentage | 6.2% | 4.3% |
| Swing | ▼2.2% | ▲4.3% |
Governor of Babil before election
Salim al-Mesalmaoui
ISCI
Subsequent Governor
Salman Hassan al-Zarkani
Sadrist Movement

The Babil governorate election of 2009 was held on 31 January 2009 alongside elections for all other governorates outside Iraqi Kurdistan and Kirkuk.

== Campaign ==
A candidate for the State of Law Coalition, Shaykh Haitham Kadhim al-Husaini was shot dead by gunmen who attacked his car when he left a campaign rally in Jabala district, a mixed Sunni-Shiite area where he lived. His wife and four children had been killed in a separate attack at their home two years previously. He was one of eight candidates across Iraq who were killed during the campaign.

== Results ==
In March, the Iraqi National Dialogue Front said they would form an alliance with the State of Law Coalition.

Summary of the 31 January 2009 Babil governorate election results
| Coalition | Allied national parties | Seats (2005) | Seats (2009) | Change | Votes |
|---|---|---|---|---|---|
| State of Law Coalition | Islamic Dawa Party | - | 8 | +8 | 60,914 |
| Al Mihrab Martyr List | Islamic Supreme Council of Iraq | 25 | 5 | -20 | 40,365 |
| Independent Free Movement List | Sadrist Movement | - | 3 | +3 | 30,119 |
| National Reform Trend | | - | 3 | +3 | 21,055 |
| Iraqi Commission for Independent Civil Society Organizations | | - | 3 | +3 | 19,875 |
| Independent Justice Society | | - | 3 | +3 | 17,683 |
| Iraqi National List | | - | 3 | +3 | 17,017 |
| Independent al-Ansar Bloc | | - | 2 | +2 | 16,493 |
| Association of Imam Ali | | 6 | - | -6 | |
| Al-Rasul Association | | 6 | - | -6 | |
| Security and reconstruction | | 2 | - | -2 | |
| Babel Independent Association | | 2 | - | -2 | 8,328 |
| Other Parties | | | | | 256,009 |
| Total | | 41 | 30 | -11 | 487,858 |
Sources: this article -
