= 2013 Al Muthanna governorate election =

2013 Muthanna Governorate election
- 20 April 2013

All 26 seats for the Muthanna Governorate council
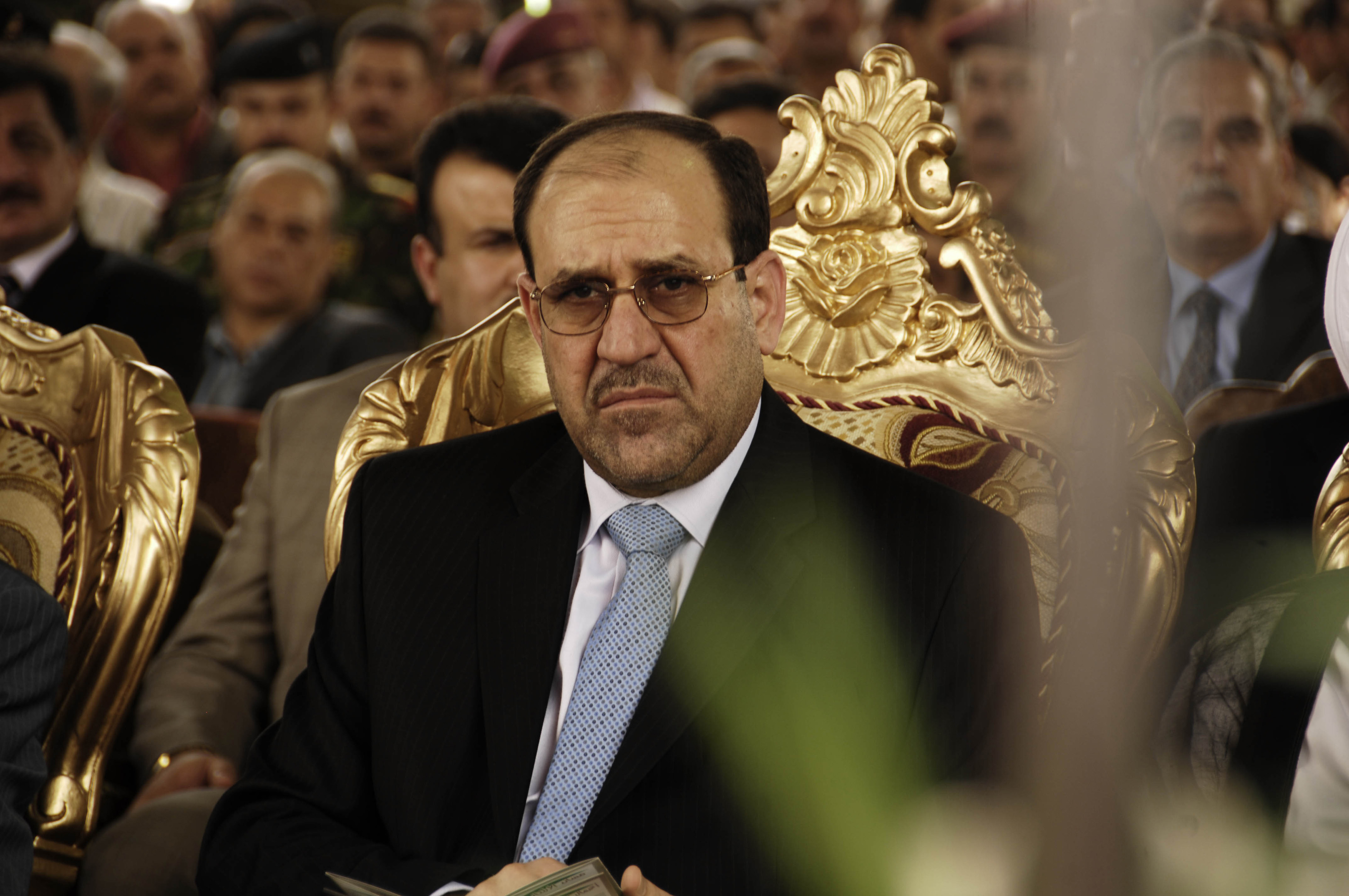

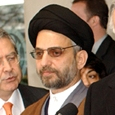
| | First party | Second party | Third party |
|---|---|---|---|
| Leader | Nouri al-Maliki | Abdul Aziz al-Hakim | Muqtada al-Sadr |
| Party | State of Law | Al-Mehraab Martyr List | Sadrist Movement |
| Seats won | 8 | 7 | 3 |
Governor of Muthanna before election
Ibrahim Salman al-Mayali
Al-Mehraab Martyr List
Subsequent Governor
TBD

The Muthanna governorate election of 2013 was held on 20 April 2013 alongside elections for all other governorates outside Iraqi Kurdistan, Kirkuk, Anbar, and Nineveh.

== Results ==
Summary of the 20 April 2013 Muthanna governorate election results
| Party/Coalition | Allied national parties | Leader | Seats | Change | Votes |
|---|---|---|---|---|---|
| State of Law Coalition | Islamic Dawa Party; Islamic Dawa Party – Iraq Organisation; Badr Organization; Islamic Virtue Party; National Reform Trend; Independent Bloc | Nouri Al-Maliki | 9 | ▲3 | 76,777 |
| Citizens Alliance | ISCI | Abdul Aziz al-Hakim | 7 | ▲2 | 67,203 |
| Liberal Coalition | Sadrist Movement | | 3 | ▲1 | 31,290 |
| Independent Iraqi Qualifications Gathering | | | 3 | | 27,065 |
| Gathering for Al Muthana | | | 2 | | 24,931 |
| Al Muthanna Alliance for Change & Reconstruction | Iraqi Communist Party; Democratic Movement; NDP; People's Party (Iraq) | Ghazi Mussa Kathem Abdul Hussein | 2 | | 17,561 |
| Al Iraqia National and United Coalition | | | | | 4,375 |
| Iraq’s Benevolence and Generosity List | | | | | 904 |
| Sons of the City Bloc | | | | | 441 |
| Iraqi Front for National Dialogue | | | | | 309 |
| Total | | | 26 | - | 250,856 |

== Sources ==
- Musings on Iraq
- ISW
- IHEC Muthanna Results
- List of political coalition approved for election in provincial councils - IHEC
- al-Sumaria - Muthanna Coalitions
