= 2009 Karbala governorate election =

2009 Karbala Governorate election
← 2005	31 January 2009	Next →

All 27 seats for the Karbala Governorate council
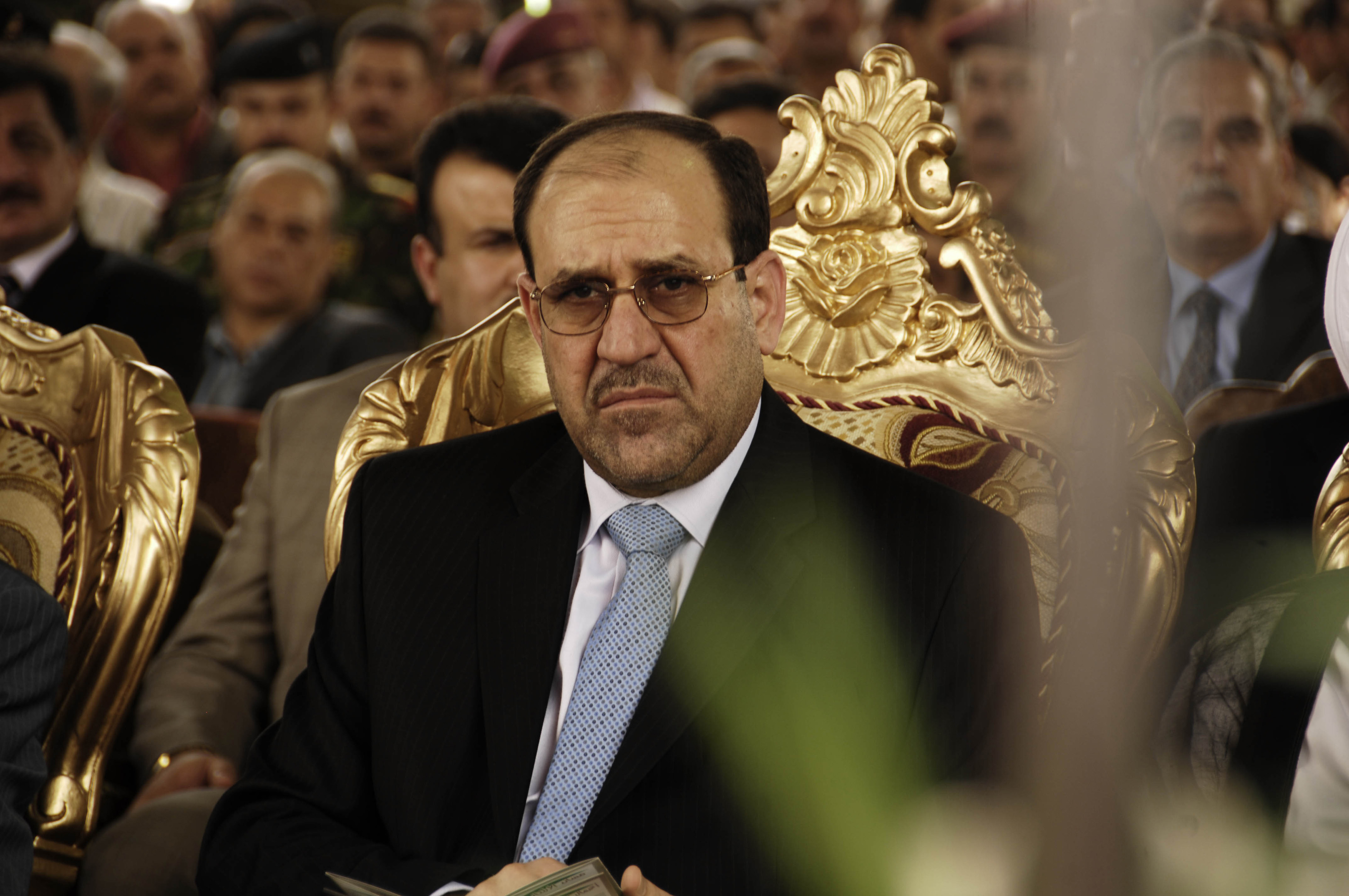

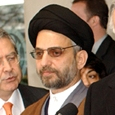
	First party	Second party
Leader	Yousef Majid Al-Habboubi	Mohammad al-Musawi
Party	Independent	Amal al-Rafidayn
Last election	0	0
Seats before	0	0
Seats won	1	9
Seat change	▲1	▲9
Popular vote	37,864	26,967
Percentage	13%	9.25%
Swing	▲13%	▲9.25%
	Third party	Fourth party
Leader	Nouri al-Maliki	Abdul Aziz al-Hakim
Party	State of Law	Al-Mehraab Martyr List
Last election	0	21
Seats before	0	21
Seats won	9	5
Seat change	▲9	▼15
Popular vote	25,469	19,364
Percentage	8.7%	6.6%
Swing	▲8.7%	▼27.7%
Governor of Karbala before election
Uqeil al-Khazaali
ISCI
Subsequent Governor
Amaleddin Majeed Hameed Kadhem
State of Law

The Karbala governorate election of 2009 was held on 31 January 2009 alongside elections for all other governorates outside Iraqi Kurdistan and Kirkuk.

== Results ==
Summary of the 31 January 2009 Karbala governorate election results
Coalition 2005/2009	Allied national parties	Leader	Seats (2005)	Seats (2009)	Change	Votes
Yousef Majid Al-Habboubi	Independent		–	1	+1	37,864
Amal al-Rafidayn (Hope of Rafidain)		Abbas al-Musawi; Mohammad al-Musawi	–	9	+9	26,967
State of Law Coalition	Islamic Dawa Party	Nouri Al-Maliki	–	9	+9	25,469
Al Mihrab Martyr List	ISCI	Abdul Aziz al-Hakim	21	4	-15	19,364
Independent Free Movement List	Sadrist Movement	Muqtada al-Sadr	–	4	+4	19,215
Islamic Virtue Party	Islamic Vertue Party	Abdelrahim Al-Husseini	5	–	-5	7,826
Independent Council of Tribal Shaykhs & Notables of Karbala Governorate			2	–	-2	6,175
Democratic Meeting for Holy Karbala			2	–	-2	
Democratic Progressive Gathering			2	–	-2	
Independent Intellectuals Gathering			2	–	-2	
Independent Unified List for the Governorate of Holy Karbala			2	–	-2	
Iraqi Democratic Current			2	–	-2	
Shi’ite Political Council			2	–	-2	
Abbas al-Hasnawi			1	–	-1	
Other Parties						
Total			41	27	-14	291,479
Sources: this article – al Sumaria – New York Times -
