= 2013 Najaf governorate election =

← 2009	20 April 2013	2018 →

All 29 seats for the Najaf Governorate council
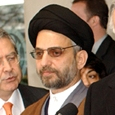

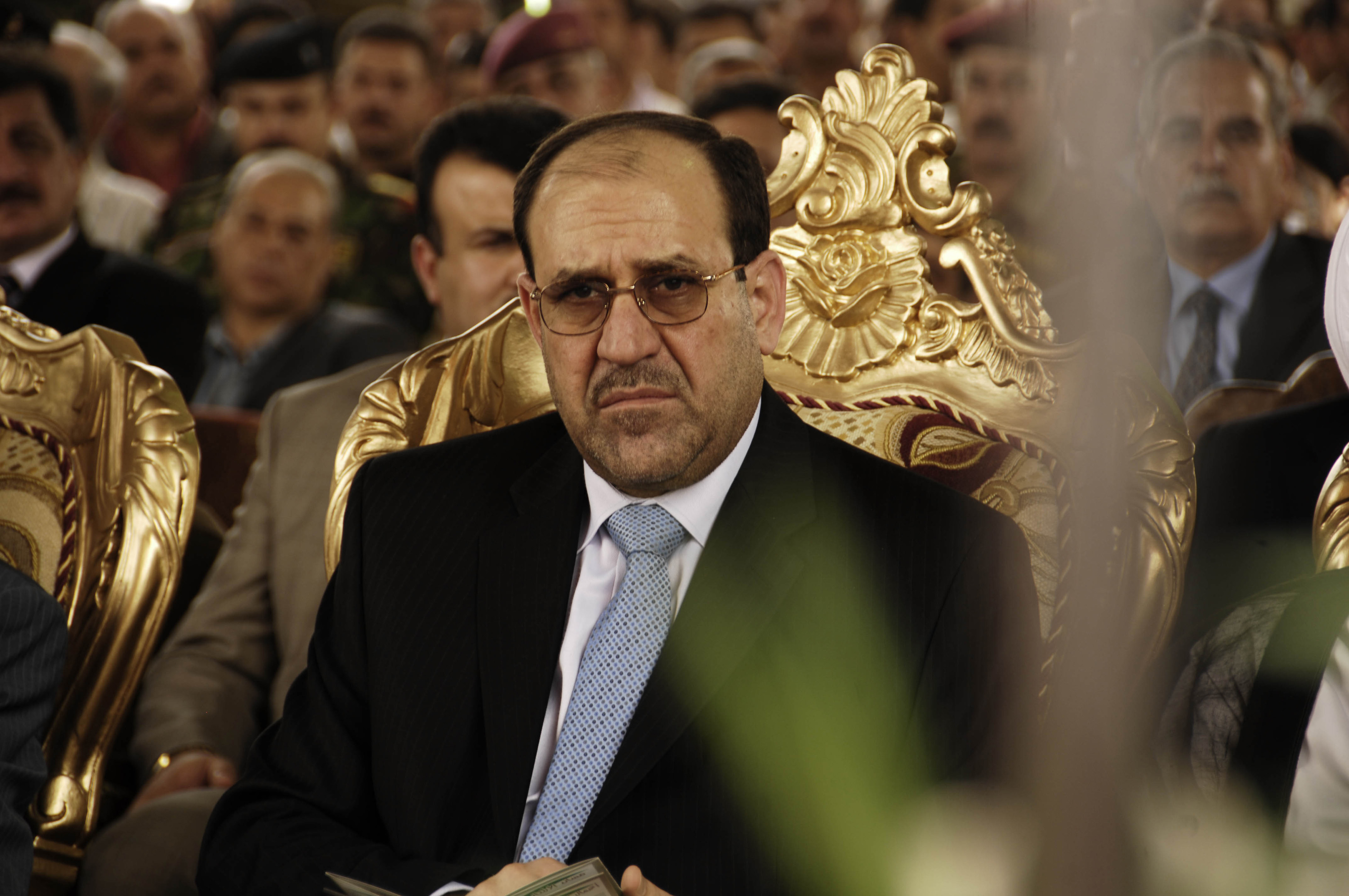
	First party	Second party	Third party
Leader	Adnan al-Zurufi	Abdul Aziz al-Hakim	Nouri al-Maliki
Party	Loyalty for Najaf	Al-Mehraab Martyr List	State of Law
Last election	4	7	0
Seats before			8
Seats won	9	6	5
Seat change	▲5	▼1	▼3
Popular vote	118,310	82,020	76,519
Percentage	29.33%	20.34%	18.97%
Swing	▲20.4%	▲5.53%	▲2.75%
	Fourth party
Leader	Muqtada al-Sadr
Party	Sadrist Movement
Last election	6
Seats won	4
Seat change	▼2
Popular vote	45,167
Percentage	11.20%
Swing	▼0.67%
Governor of Najaf before election
Adnan al-Zurufi
Loyalty for Najaf
Subsequent Governor
TBD

The Najaf governorate election of 2013 was held on 20 April 2013 alongside elections for all other governorates outside Iraqi Kurdistan, Kirkuk, Anbar, and Nineveh.

== Results ==
Summary of the 20 April 2013 Najaf governorate election results
Party/Coalition	Allied national parties	Leader	Seats	Change	Votes	%	Swing
Loyalty for Najaf		Adnan al-Zurufi	9	▲5	118,310	29.33%	▲20.4%
Citizens Alliance	ISCI	Ammar al-Hakim	6	▼1	82,020	20.34%	▲5.53%
State of Law Coalition	Islamic Dawa Party	Nouri Al-Maliki	5	▼3	76,519	18.97%	▲2.75%
Liberal Coalition	Sadrist Movement	Muqtada al-Sadr	4	▼2	45,167	11.20%	▼0.67%
Equitable State Movement			2	▲2	25,889	6.42%	
Najaf Province’s Change Coalition			1	▲1	14,464	3.59%	
National Partnership Gathering			1	▲1	14,314	3.55%	
Renaissance and Building Gathering			1	▲1	8,521	2.11%	
Islamic Dawa Party – Iraq Organisation		Hashim Al-Mosawy	1	▲1	7,571	1.88%	
Al Najaf Civil Alliance					5,760	1.43%	
Al Iraqia National and United Coalition		Ayad Allawi			2,599	0.64%	
Iraq’s Benevolence and Generosity List					1,976	0.49%	▲0.49%
Iraq’s Integrity Gathering					211	0.05%	▲0.05%
Total			29	–	403,321		
Sources: Musings on Iraq, ISW, IHEC Najaf Results, List of political coalition approved for election in provincial councils – IHEC Archived 28 May 2015 at the Wayback Machine, al-Sumaria – Najaf Coalitions
