= 2009 Maysan governorate election =

2009 Maysan Governorate election
← 2005	31 January 2009	2013 →

All 26 seats for the Maysan Governorate council
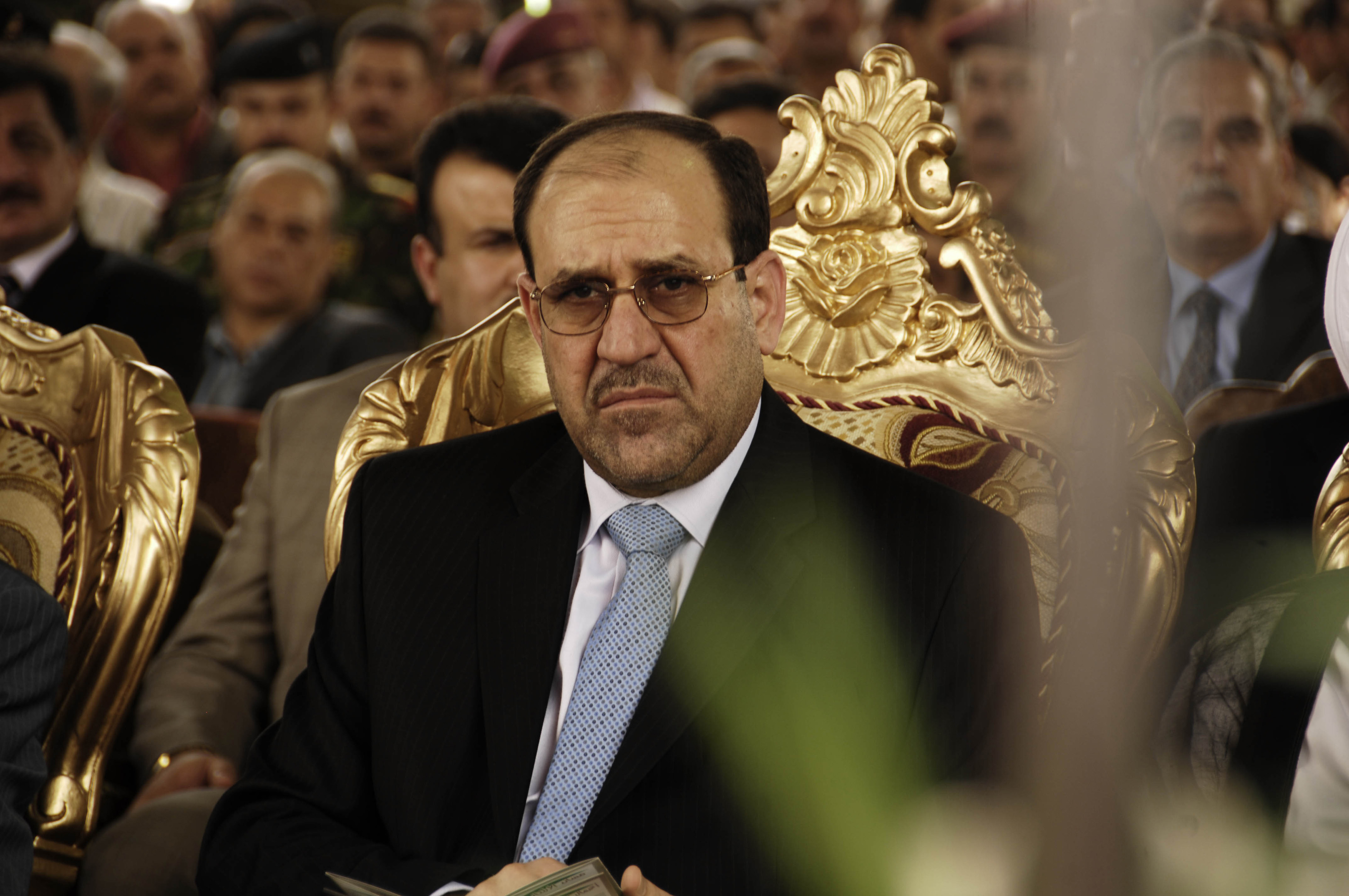

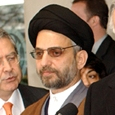

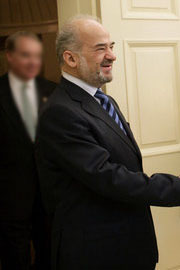
	First party	Second party
Leader	Nouri al-Maliki	Abdul Aziz al-Hakim
Party	State of Law	Al-Mehraab Martyr List
Last election	1	6
Seats before	1	6
Seats won	8	7
Seat change	▲7	▲1
Popular vote	42,214	35,093
Percentage	18%	15.97%
Swing	▲	▲
	Third party	Fourth party
Leader	Muqtada al-Sadr	Ibrahim al-Jaafari
Party	Independent Free Movement	National Reform Trend
Last election	15	0
Seats before	15	0
Seats won	7	4
Seat change	▼9	▲4
Popular vote	35,075	20,144
Percentage	14.96%	8.59%
Swing	▼	▲8.59%
Governor of Maysan before election
Adil Mahwadar Radi
Sadrist Movement
Subsequent Governor
Muhammed al-Sudani
State of Law

The Maysan governorate election of 2009 was held on 31 January 2009 alongside elections for all other governorates outside Iraqi Kurdistan and Kirkuk.

== Results ==
Summary of the 31 January 2009 Maysan governorate election results
Coalition 2005/2009	Allied national parties	Leader	Seats (2005)	Seats (2009)	Change	Votes
State of Law Coalition	Islamic Dawa Party	Nouri Al-Maliki	1	8	+7	42,214
Al Mihrab Martyr List	ISCI	Abdul Aziz al-Hakim	6	7	+1	35,093
Independent Free Movement List	Sadrist Movement	Muqtada al-Sadr	15	7	-8	35,075
National Reform Trend	National Reform Trend	Ibrahim al-Jaafari	–	4	+4	20,144
Islamic Dawa Party – Iraq Organization	IDPIO		5	–	-5	
Al-Rida Center for Culture & Guidance			3	–	-3	
Gathering of the Independent Sons of Maysan			2	–	-2	
Iraqi Republican Group			2	–	-2	
Independent National Islamic Congregation			1	-	-1	
Maysan Democratic Coalition			1	–	-1	
Shi’ite Political Council			1	-	-1	
Other Parties						101,872
Total			41	26	-15	234,398
Sources: this article – Al Sumaria – New York Times -
