= 2013 Maysan governorate election =

2013 Maysan Governorate election
← 2009	20 April 2013	2017 →

All 27 seats for the Maysan Governorate council
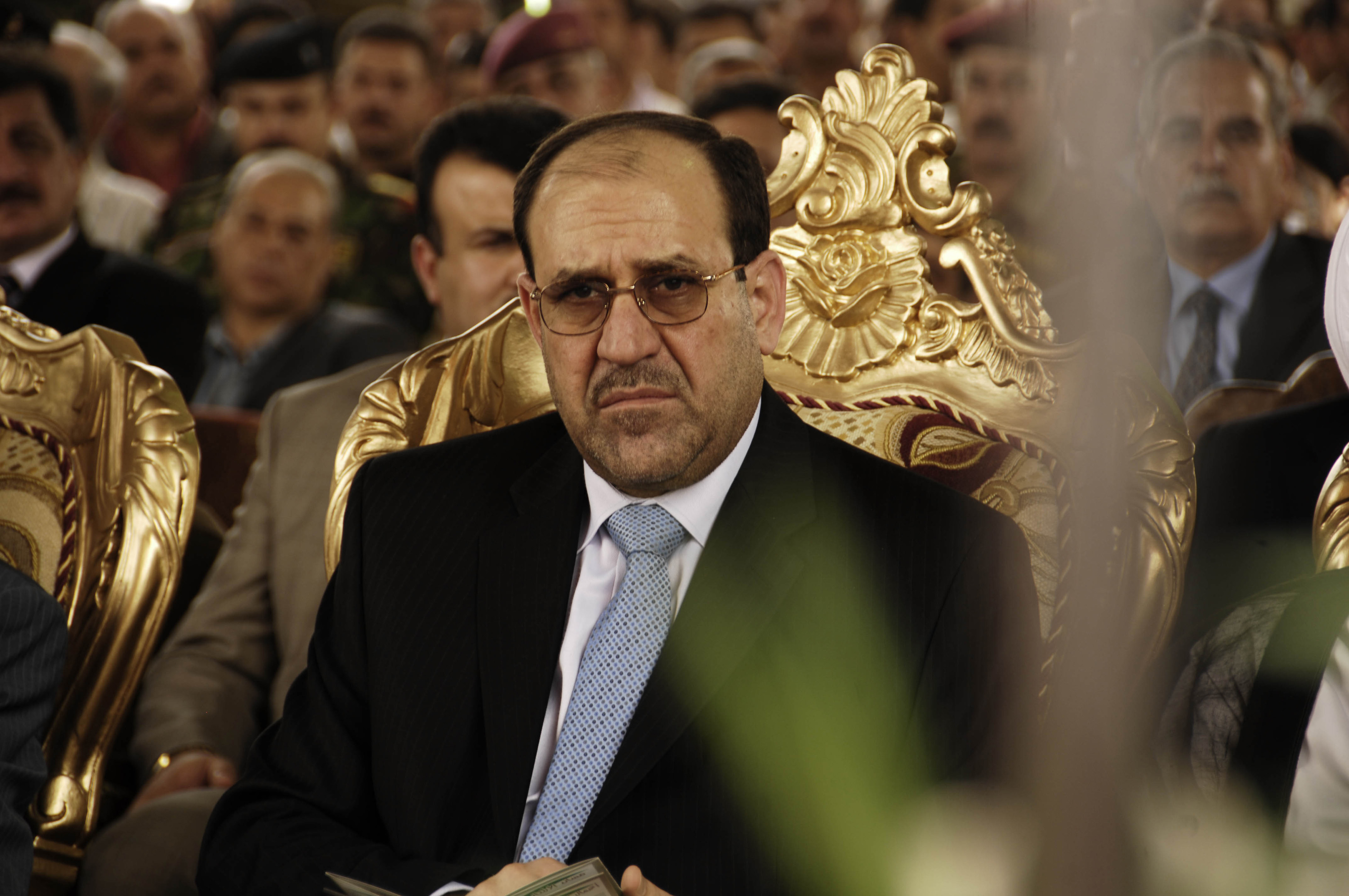
	First party	Second party	Third party
Leader	Muqtada al-Sadr	Nouri al-Maliki	Ammar al-Hakim
Party	Sadrist Movement	State of Law	Al-Mehraab Martyr List
Seats won	9	8	6
Governor of Maysan before election
Muhammed al-Sudani
State of Law
Subsequent Governor
TBD

The Maysan governorate election of 2013 was held on 20 April 2013 alongside elections for all other governorates outside Iraqi Kurdistan, Kirkuk, Anbar, and Nineveh.

== Results ==
Summary of the 20 April 2013 Maysan governorate election results
Party/Coalition	Allied national parties	Leader	Seats	Change	Votes
Liberal Coalition	Sadrist Movement	Muqtada al-Sadr	9	▲2	89,906
State of Law Coalition	Islamic Dawa Party; National Reform Trend	Nouri Al-Maliki	8	▼4*	77,917
Citizens Alliance	ISCI	Ammar al-Hakim	6	▼2	63,060
Honesty and Generosity			1	▲1	11,605
National Partnership Gathering			1	▲1	10,771
National Flag Gathering			1	▲1	9,814
Islamic Dawa Party – Iraq Organisation			1	▲1	5,615
Maysan Civil Alliance					2,894
Al Iraqia National and United Coalition					771
Total			27	-	272,353
Sources: Musings on Iraq, ISW, IHEC Maysan Results, List of political coalition approved for election in provincial councils - IHEC Archived 2015-05-28 at the Wayback Machine, al-Sumaria - Maysan Coalitions
Notes: *Although the State of Law Coalition only won 8 seats in 2009, the National Reform Trend ran as part of the State of Law Coalition in 2013. The NRT had won 4 seats in Maysan in 2009.
