= 2009 Iraqi governorate elections =

2nd Iraqi governorate elections

- 31 January 2009

440 seats comprising 14 of the 18 governorates of Iraq
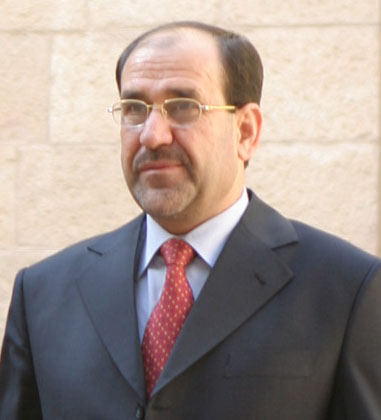

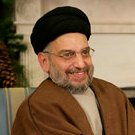

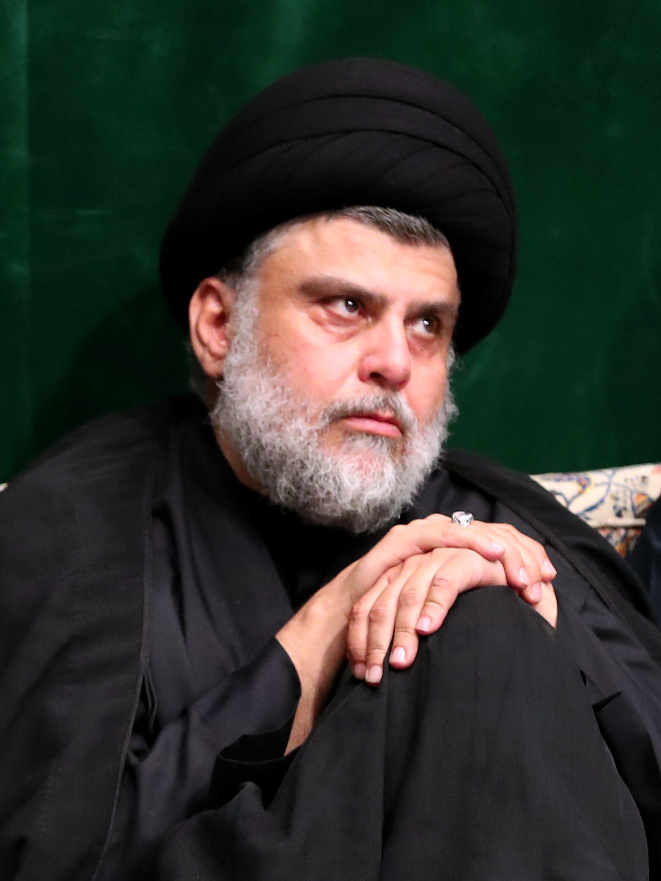

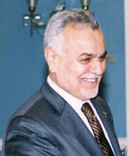

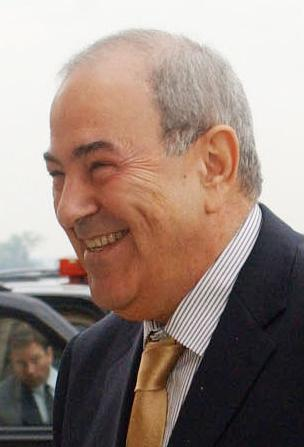

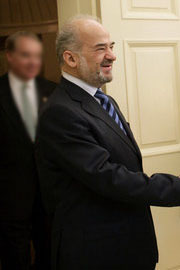
| | First party | Second party | Third party |
|---|---|---|---|
| Leader | Nouri al-Maliki | Abdul Aziz al-Hakim | Muqtada al-Sadr |
| Party | State of Law | Al-Mehraab Martyr List | Independent Free Movement |
| Last election | 42 | 195 |
| Seats won | 126 | 52 | 43 |
| Seat change | ▲84 | ▼143 | ▼17 |
| Popular vote | 1,362,594 | 482,800 | 434,849 |
| Percentage | 19.1% | 6.8% | 6.1% |
| | Fourth party | Fifth party | Sixth party |
| Leader | Tariq Al-Hashimi | Ayad Allawi | Ibrahim al-Jaafari |
| Party | Tawafuq | INL | National Reform Trend |
| Last election | 45 | 18 |
| Seats won | 32 | 26 | 23 |
| Seat change | ▼13 | ▲8 | ▲23 |
| Popular vote | 449,575 | 404,201 | 273,130 |
| Percentage | 6.3% | 5.7% | 3.8% |
- Colours show the largest list per governorate

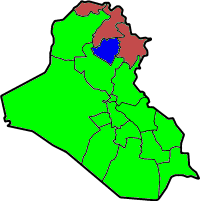
Governorates holding election are green; Kirkuk (blue) and Iraqi Kurdistan (red) postponed their elections for later on the year.

Governorate or provincial elections were held in Iraq on 31 January 2009, to replace the local councils in fourteen of the eighteen governorates of Iraq that were elected in the 2005 Iraqi governorate elections. 14,431 candidates, including 3,912 women, contested 440 seats. The candidates came from over 400 parties, 75% of which were newly formed.

== Legal framework ==
In February 2008, the Iraqi Parliament passed a Provincial Powers Act by a majority of one, with many members of parliament not present at the proceedings. It included giving the Prime Minister the power to dismiss a governor of a province, a measure that would have left considerable power in the hands of the Shi'a dominated central government in Baghdad. The Act required a Provincial Elections Law to be passed within the next 90 days and for elections to be held no later than the beginning of October 2008.

The Presidency Council initially referred the law back, saying it did not comply with the constitutional rights of governorates. It was reported that vice President Adil Abdul-Mahdi, whose Supreme Islamic Iraqi Council party is strong in many southern Iraqi governorate councils, particularly objected. However, the Council reversed its position following protests from the Sadrist Movement, saying they would instead seek changes to the law before it came into force.

In July 2008 the Iraqi Election Commission proposed postponing the elections until December because delays in passing the election law had left too little time to prepare.

The Provincial Elections bill was eventually approved by the Council of Representatives on 22 July 2008 despite a walkout by members of the Kurdistani Alliance over a clause making Kirkuk Governorate council a power-sharing arrangement. The next day the Presidency Council of Iraq, consisting of President Jalal Talabani, who is Kurdish, Vice-President Adel Abdul Mahdi, a Shi'ite Arab, and Vice-President Tariq al-Hashimi, a Sunni Arab, unanimously agreed to reject the bill because of the Kirkuk clause, and send it back to the Council of Representatives to reconsider.

The second draft was ratified by the Presidency Council on 7 October 2008, who stated that a minority clause may be added later. A minority clause was added on 3 November.

== Kirkuk Governorate ==
The original draft proposed delaying the election in Kirkuk Governorate until after the referendum to decide its precise status has been held. However, a group of Turkmen and Arab MPs proposed a power-sharing clause, establishing a provincial council consisting of ten Kurds, ten Arabs, ten Turkmens and two Assyrians. This clause was included in the draft election bill put to the Iraqi Council of Representatives in July 2008, and led to the Kurdish parties walking out in protest, complaining "If you already pick the seats before the election, why vote?" The law was nonetheless approved on 22 July 2008. However, President Jalal Talabani, who is Kurdish, and Vice-President Adel Abdul Mahdi, a Shi'ite Arab, have agreed they would reject the bill, and hence it would be sent back to the Council of Representatives to reconsider.

Parliamentary summer recess started on 30 July 2008, but a special session was called for 3 August 2008 to find a solution to the Kirkuk issue. At that meeting, no solution was reached; at another meeting on 4 August 2008, lawmakers postponed the session to 5 August 2008, and on that date to 6 August 2008. It was then postponed to 9 September 2008, with a committee working on a compromise solution until then. At that session, no resolution was reached, and negotiations continued on 10 September 2008 in the form of a special six-member panel formed for this occasion. The law was finally passed on 24 September 2008 and the election is expected to be held by 31 January 2009; the compromise was that Kirkuk would be dealt with separately, and elections in Kirkuk and the three Kurdish autonomous provinces will be held at a later time. A special panel was to work on a solution on Kirkuk and report back by 31 March 2009.

The United Nations Special Representative for Iraq, Staffan de Mistura proposed holding elections in all governorates except Kirkuk, and deferring the Kirkuk elections for six months in order to find an acceptable compromise. A draft bill based on this proposal was debated on 6 August and accepted by the Kurdistani Alliance but opposed by the Iraqi Turkmen Front, Iraqi Accord Front and Sadrist Movement who objected to the draft law's reference to the Kirkuk status referendum and insisted on delaying the entire elections until a solution was found.

== Minorities ==
Under Article 50 of the draft Elections law, religious minorities such as Christians and Yazidis would be reserved a number of seats in the provincial assemblies. This clause was removed in the final draft, with legislators citing a lack of census data for determining the appropriate number of seats. Five thousand Christians demonstrated in Mosul against this change, saying it was a "marginalisation of their rights" and the head of the Assyrian Church of the East wrote to the Presidency Council asking them to veto the law.

Prime Minister al-Maliki said he was concerned and called on parliament and the Iraqi High Electoral Commission to "remove all the concerns, injustice and the sense of exclusion felt by some segments of Iraqi society". Kurdish MP Mahmoud Othman called on the Presidency Council of Iraq to use its review process to force an amendment to include a minority quota, saying "The rule of the majority means there should be protection of the minorities" A Sadrist leader also said Christians should be allowed to "contribute to the building of the Iraqi state" and the removal of this clause "threatened the unity of Iraq" The UN Special Envoy also criticised the removal of the minorities clause.

A minority clause was added on 3 November 2008, although it only provided for six special seats (three for Christians, one each for Yazidi, Mandean and Shabak) instead of twelve as recommended by the UN. The Christians got a seat each in Baghdad, Nineveh, and Basra, the Yazidi and Shabak in Nineveh, and the Mandeans in Baghdad.

== Female quota ==
Original drafts of the Election law included a guarantee that the elected councils would contain at least 25% women. However, the law passed stated instead that there would be "a woman at the end of every three winners". The Electoral Commission has interpreted this to mean that where a list wins more than two seats in a particular governorate, the third seat will be awarded to a woman on the party's list. Given the large number of parties contesting the election, many of whom are expected to win one or two seats, female MPs raised concerns that the change in language has weakened this provision.

== Electoral system ==
The previous Governorate and national elections in Iraq have been held under a "Closed list" electoral system, whereby voters select a party or coalition and the party or coalition selects the individual parliamentarian.

The new election will be held under an "Open list" system, whereby voters may select either a party or an individual candidate; the candidates elected from a list will be those that get the most individual votes from among that list.

The system also promotes the representation of women, for if the top two people elected from a list are men, the subsequent person elected will be the woman with the most votes.

== Militias ==
In March, the government of Nouri al-Maliki moved against militias allied to the Sadrist Movement in Basrah Governorate. Sadrists accused Maliki of trying to weaken them ahead of the polls, but Maliki claimed he was just targeting "criminal gangs".

Following this, Maliki said he would disqualify any parties from the election who refused to disband their militia. In April the cabinet agreed on a draft elections law, which included a clause banning parties with militias. The Sadr Movement however, still ran in the elections.

== Campaign ==
The security situation in this election was much better than in previous elections. Security was provided by the Iraqi security forces with the Multinational force in Iraq playing no role for the first time. Candidates felt safe enough to canvass for votes, while the 2005 elections saw little public campaigning. Nonetheless, eight candidates were killed during the campaign, borders were closed for voting and curfews and vehicle bans were put in place. However, this compared favourably to the 2005 elections when over 200 candidates were killed.

Early voting took place on Wednesday 28 January for 614,000 soldiers, police, prisoners, patients and internally displaced people.

=== Sunni Arab areas ===
The current Governorate councils were elected in the 2005 Iraqi governorate elections, which were boycotted by Sunni Arabs, resulting in several Sunni Arab-majority provinces such as Nineveh Governorate and Saladin Governorate being run either ethnic Kurdish parties, or multi-ethnic parties of Shia faith. As Sunni Arab parties have since decided to participate in elections, these elections are expected to give them more representation.

The elections are also expected to develop electoral competition within the Sunni Arab population between the pro-government Iraqi Accord Front and the new political groups formed out of the anti-al-Qaeda Awakening movement militias. A leading member of the Awakening movement in Baghdad, Abu Azzam al-Tamimi, has formed the Iraqi Dignity Front to contest the elections. The Awakening movement in Anbar has formed the National Front for the Salvation of Iraq. These parties are expected to sweep the Sunni Arab vote in Anbar, Salahuddin, Diyala, and Baghdad.

In Ninawa, the Sunni Arab-majority al-Hadba party—which is also backed by Prime Minister Nouri al-Maliki—complained of being targeted by Kurdish security forces. A candidate for the Sunni Arab "Iraq for Us" coalition in Ninawa was killed by a gunman who walked into a café and shot him.

=== Shiite Arab areas ===
One senior government official said the elections would "redraw the political map of Iraq" while Vice President Adel Abdul Mahdi described them as a "major rehearsal for the parliamentary elections" due in 2009–2010. An expert from the International Crisis Group predicted a "big shift", with the existing parties established by exiles losing ground to more recently formed parties of people who stayed in Iraq during the rule of Saddam Hussein.

There is also expected to be significant electoral competition between two main Shiite Islamist parties in the government—the Islamic Dawa Party of Prime Minister Nouri al-Maliki and the Supreme Islamic Iraqi Council of Vice-President Adil Abdul-Mahdi. Following the Battle of Basra (2008), the Prime Minister created "support councils" to help with security in the southern provinces and Maliki was accused of using these support councils to build a political base. The Presidency Council of Iraq publicly criticised the Prime Minister in November 2008, saying these support councils were illegal, should be suspended and the money used to support the regular Army and Police.

Competition is also expected between the government Islamist parties and the opposition Sadrist Movement, with some commentators saying Sadrists were expected to win a majority of seats in southern Iraq and parts of Baghdad. The Sadrist Movement supported the Blamelessness and Reconstruction (376) list and the Independent Trend of the Noble Ones (284)

Some commentators predicted there would be a backlash against the incumbent religious parties in favour of more secular parties.

Shortly before the election, an initiative was started in Basra Province to convert the province into a Region. The initiative failed to reach 10% of eligible voters in the specified period, meaning it fell.

== Results ==
Election map showing the largest list per governorate

There were 15 million eligible voters, but hundreds of thousands of voters were omitted from the ballot lists. Mithal al-Alusi, an Arab nationalist MP, complained that there were "many mistakes" by the Commission and Iranian diplomats had been allowed entry to polling stations.

There were international observers in every one of the 712 constituencies—the first election since the 2003 invasion of Iraq to be fully observed.

Unlike the 2005 election, there was no boycott by any significant political movement; however, turnout was down on the previous election at slightly over 51%. ISCI blamed the election day vehicle ban, which meant voters often had to walk long distances to the polling centres.

Official results were not expected until days after the election. The Islamic Dawa Party turned as largest party in Shi'a south.

=== Total seats ===
| Party | Total votes | Percentage | Total seats | Party leader |
|---|---|---|---|---|
| State of Law Coalition | 1,362,594 | 19.1% | 126 | Nouri al-Maliki |
| al-Mehraab Martyr List | 482,800 | 6.8% | 52 | Abdul Aziz al-Hakim |
| Independent Free Movement | 434,849 | 6.1% | 43 | Muqtada al-Sadr |
| Iraqi Accord Front | 449,575 | 6.3% | 32 | Tariq al-Hashemi |
| Iraqi National List | 404,201 | 5.7% | 26 | Ayad Allawi |
| National Reform Trend | 273,130 | 3.8% | 23 | Ibrahim al-Jaafari |
| Brotherhood List | 353,328 | 5.0% | 20 | Barzani, Talabani |
| National Iraqi Project Gathering | 328,250 | 4.6% | 19 | Saleh al-Mutlaq |
| Al-Hadbaa National List | 435,595 | 6.1% | 19 | Atheel al-Nujaifi |
| Awakening Council | 56,262 | 0.8% | 8 | Abu Risha |
| Islamic Virtue Party | 140,648 | 2.0% | 6 | Abdul al-Huseini |
| Other Parties | 2,422,424 | 33.7% | 66 | - |
| Total | 7,143,656 | 100% | 440 | - |

Provincial turnout

| Governorate | Votes cast | Seats |
|---|---|---|
| Anbar | 317,074 | 29 |
| Babil | 487,858 | 30 |
| Baghdad | 1,694,930 | 57 |
| Basra | 646,109 | 35 |
| Dhi Qar | 453,806 | 31 |
| Diyala | 430,407 | 29 |
| Karbala | 291,479 | 27 |
| Maysan | 234,398 | 27 |
| Muthanna | 207,752 | 26 |
| Najaf | 338,540 | 28 |
| Nineveh | 995,169 | 37 |
| Qadisiyyah | 332,176 | 28 |
| Saladin | 403,764 | 28 |
| Wasit | 310,194 | 28 |
| Total: | 7,143,656 | 440 |

=== Al Anbar Governorate ===
| Party | Total votes | Percentage | Seats | Party leader |
|---|---|---|---|---|
| Iraq Awakening and Independents National Alliance (Sahwa) | 56,262 | 17.1% | 8 | Abu Risha |
| National Iraqi Project Gathering | 53,487 | 17.6% | 6 | Saleh al-Mutlaq |
| Tribes and Educated Coalition for Development | 51,733 | 15.9% | 6 | Tariq al-Hashemi |
| National Movement for Development and Reform (al-Hal) | 23,835 | 7.8% | 3 | Jamal al-Karbuli |
| Iraqi National List | 21,551 | 6.6% | 2 | Ayad Allawi |
| Coalition for Iraqi National Unity | 14,439 | 4.6% | 2 | Mohammed al-Kasanzani |
| Tribes of Iraq Coalition | 13,798 | 4.5% | 2 | Hamid al-Hais |
| Other parties | - | 25.9% | 0 | |
| Total | 317,074 | 100% | 29 | |

=== Babil Governorate ===
| Party | Total votes | Percentage | Seats | Party leader |
|---|---|---|---|---|
| State of Law Coalition | 60,914 | 12.5% | 8 | Nouri al-Maliki |
| al-Mehraab Martyr List | 40,365 | 8.2% | 5 | Abdul Aziz al-Hakim |
| Independent Free Movement | 30,119 | 6.2% | 3 | Muqtada al-Sadr |
| National Reform Trend | 21,055 | 4.4% | 3 | Ibrahim al-Jaafari |
| Iraqi Commission for Independent Civil Society Organizations | 19,875 | 4.1% | 3 | Saleh al-Mutlaq |
| Independent Justice Association | 17,683 | 3.7% | 3 | |
| Iraqi National List | 17,017 | 3.4% | 3 | Ayad Allawi |
| Independent Ansar Bloc | 16,493 | 3.4% | 2 | |
| Other parties | - | 54.1% | 0 | |
| Total | 487,858 | 100% | 30 | |

=== Baghdad Governorate ===
| Party | Total votes | Percentage | Seats | Party leader |
|---|---|---|---|---|
| State of Law Coalition | 641,925 | 38.0% | 28 | Nouri al-Maliki |
| National Accordance Front (Tawafuq) | 153,219 | 9.0% | 7 | Tariq al-Hashimi |
| Independent Free Movement | 151,093 | 9.0% | 5 | Muqtada al-Sadr |
| Iraqi National List | 148,133 | 8.6% | 5 | Ayad Allawi |
| National Iraqi Project Gathering | 113,787 | 6.9% | 4 | Saleh al-Mutlaq |
| al-Mehraab Martyr List (ISCI) | 91,759 | 5.4% | 3 | Abdul Aziz al-Hakim |
| National Reform Trend | 71,663 | 4.3% | 3 | Ibrahim al-Jaafari |
| Other parties | - | 18.8% | 0 | |
Minority Seats:
| Christian Seat: Ishtar Patriotic List | 4,334 | | 1 | Sarkis Aghajan |
| Sabean-Mandean Seat: Independent | 241 | | 1 | Ali Hussein al-Saberi |
| Total | 1,694,930 | 100% | 57 | |

source: IHEC

=== Basra Governorate ===
| Party | Total votes | Percentage | Seats | Party leader |
|---|---|---|---|---|
| State of Law Coalition | 239,007 | 37.0% | 20 | Nouri al-Maliki |
| al-Mehraab Martyr List (ISCI) | 74,879 | 11.6% | 5 | Abdul Aziz al-Hakim |
| Gathering of Justice and Unity | 34,862 | 5.5% | 2 | al-Faiz |
| Independent Free Movement (Sadrist) | 32,020 | 5.0% | 2 | Muqtada al-Sadr |
| Iraqi Islamic Party | 24,813 | 3.8% | 2 | Tariq al-Hashimi |
| Iraqi National List | 21,091 | 3.2% | 2 | Ayad Allawi |
| Islamic Virtue Party (Fadhila) | 20,932 | 3.2% | 1 | Abdul al-Hasini |
| Other parties | - | 30.7% | 0 | |
| Christian Seat: Chaldean Democratic Union Party | 227 | - | 1 | Ablahad Afraim Sawa |
| Total | 646,109 | 100% | 35 | |

=== Dhi Qar Governorate ===
| Party | Total votes | Percentage | Seats | Party leader |
|---|---|---|---|---|
| State of Law Coalition | 107,410 | 23.1% | 13 | Nouri al-Maliki |
| Independent Free Movement | 61,929 | 14.1% | 7 | Muqtada al-Sadr |
| al-Mehraab Martyr List (ISCI) | 51,463 | 11.1% | 5 | Abdul Aziz al-Hakim |
| National Reform Trend | 34,255 | 7.6% | 4 | Ibrahim al-Jaafari |
| Islamic Virtue Party (Fadhila) | 27,138 | 6.1% | 2 | Abdul al-Hasini |
| Other parties | - | 48% | 0 | |
| Total | 453,806 | 100% | 31 | |

=== Diyala Governorate ===
| Party | Total votes | Percentage | Seats | Party leader |
|---|---|---|---|---|
| United Accord and Reform Front in Diyala (Tawafuq) | 91,135 | 21.1% | 9 | Tariq al-Hashemi |
| National Iraqi Project Gathering | 66,309 | 17.0% | 6 | Saleh al-Mutlaq |
| Kurdistan Alliance | 62,219 | 15.0% | 6 | Massoud Barzani, Jalal Talabani |
| Iraqi National List | 42,650 | 9.5% | 3 | Ayad Allawi |
| State of Law Coalition | 27,408 | 6.0% | 2 | Nouri al-Maliki |
| National Diyala Alliance | 25,068 | 5.3% | 2 | Abdul Aziz al-Hakim |
| National Reform Trend | 20,140 | 4.3% | 1 | Ibrahim al-Jaafari |
| Other parties | - | 21.6% | 0 | |
| Total | 430,407 | 100% | 29 | |

=== Karbala Governorate ===
| Party | Total votes | Percentage | Seats | Party leader |
|---|---|---|---|---|
| Youssef Mohammed al-Haboubi | 37,846 | 13.3% | 1 | Independent |
| Hope of Al-Refedein | 26,967 | 8.8% | 9 | (Sadrist Affiliated) |
| State of Law Coalition | 25,649 | 8.5% | 9 | Nouri al-Maliki |
| al-Mehrab Martyr List (ISCI) | 19,346 | 6.8% | 4 | Abdul Aziz al-Hakim |
| Independent Free Movement | 19,215 | 6.4% | 4 | Muqtada al-Sadr |
| Other parties | | 56.2% | 0 | |
| Total | 291,479 | 100% | 27 | |

Note: While Youssef al-Haboubi got the most votes, he stood as independent candidate, thus only winning one seat for himself.

=== Maysan Governorate ===
| Party | Total votes | Percentage | Seats | Party leader |
|---|---|---|---|---|
| State of Law Coalition | 42,214 | 17.7% | 8 | Nouri al-Maliki |
| al-Mehraab Martyr List (ISCI) | 35,093 | 15.2% | 8 | Abdul Aziz al-Hakim |
| Independent Free Movement | 35,075 | 14.6% | 7 | Muqtada al-Sadr |
| National Reform Trend | 20,144 | 8.7% | 4 | Ibrahim al-Jaafari |
| Other parties | | 43.8% | 0 | |
| Total | 234,398 | 100% | 27 | |

=== Muthanna Governorate ===
| Party | Total votes | Percentage | Seats | Party leader |
|---|---|---|---|---|
| State of Law Coalition | 22,627 | 10.9% | 5 | Nouri al-Maliki |
| al-Mehraab Martyr List (ISCI) | 19,448 | 9.3% | 5 | Abdul Aziz al-Hakim |
| Al-Jumhoor List | 14,520 | 7.1% | 3 | |
| National Reform Trend | 12,878 | 6.3% | 3 | Ibrahim al-Jaafari |
| Independent Free Movement | 11,436 | - | 2 | Muqtada al-Sadr |
| Gathering for Muthanna | 10,867 | 5.0% | 2 | |
| Independent National List | 9,854 | 4.9% | 2 | |
| Independent Iraqi Skills Gathering | 8,941 | 4.4% | 2 | |
| Middle Euphrates Gathering | 8,322 | 3.9% | 2 | |
| Other parties | | 42.7% | 0 | |
| Total | 207,752 | 100% | 26 | |

=== Najaf Governorate ===
| Party | Total votes | Percentage | Seats | Party leader |
|---|---|---|---|---|
| State of Law Coalition | 54,907 | 16.2% | 7 | Nouri al-Maliki |
| al-Mehraab Martyr List (ISCI) | 50,146 | 14.8% | 7 | Abdul Aziz al-Hakim |
| Independent Free Movement | 40,186 | 12.2% | 6 | Muqtada al-Sadr |
| Loyalty for Najaf | 30,219 | 8.3% | 4 | Adnan al-Zurufi |
| National Reform Trend | 23,377 | 7.0% | 2 | Ibrahim al-Jaafari |
| Independent Najaf Union | 12,766 | 3.7% | 2 | |
| Other parties | | 37.8% | 0 | |
| Total | 338,540 | 100% | 28 | |

=== Nineveh Governorate ===
| Party | Total votes | Percentage | Seats | Party leader |
|---|---|---|---|---|
| Al-Hadbaa National List | 435,595 | 48.4% | 19 | Atheel al-Nujaifi |
| Brotherhood Ninawa | 273,458 | 25.5% | 12 | Massoud Barzani, Jalal Talebani |
| Iraqi Islamic Party | 60,191 | 6.7% | 3 | Tariq al-Hashemi |
| Other parties | | 19.4% | 0 | |
Minority seats
| Christian Seat: Ishtar Patriotic List | 13,760 | | 1 | Sarkis Aghajan |
| Shabaki Seat: Qussai Abbas Mohammed | 12,949 | | 1 | Independent |
| Yezidi Seat: Yazidi Movement for Reform and Progress | 6,174 | | 1 | |
| Total | 995,169 | 100% | 37 | |

=== Al-Qādisiyyah Governorate ===
| Party | Total votes | Percentage | Seats | Party leader |
|---|---|---|---|---|
| State of Law Coalition | 78,276 | 23.1% | 11 | Nouri al-Maliki |
| al-Mehrab Martyr List (ISCI) | 38,972 | 11.7% | 4 | Abdul Aziz al-Hakim |
| Iraqi National List | 27,687 | 8.2% | 3 | Ayad Allawi |
| National Reform Trend | 26,738 | 8.0% | 3 | Ibrahim al-Jaafari |
| Independent Free Movement | 21,742 | 6.7% | 2 | Muqtada al Sadr |
| Islamic Loyalty Party | 14,054 | 4.3% | 2 | (Sadrist Affiliated) |
| Islamic Virtue Party | 13,596 | 4.1% | 2 | Abdul al-Hasini |
| Other parties | | 33.9% | 0 | |
| Total | 332,176 | 100% | 28 | |

=== Saladin Governorate ===
| Party | Total votes | Percentage | Seats | Party leader |
|---|---|---|---|---|
| Salahuddin Accordance Front (Tawafiq) | 57,264 | 14.5% | 5 | Tariq al-Hashemi |
| Iraqi National List | 56,853 | 13.9% | 5 | Ayad Allawi |
| National Iraqi Project Front (Groups) | 35,482 | 8.7% | 3 | |
| National Iraqi Project Gathering | 35,131 | 8.5% | 3 | Saleh al-Mutlaq |
| Iraqi Scholars and Intellectuals Group | 23,772 | 6.0% | 2 | |
| Iraqi Turkoman Front | 19,013 | 4.8% | 2 | Saadeddin Arkej |
| Liberation and Construction Front | 18,743 | 4.5% | 2 | |
| National Salah ad-Din List | 18,079 | 4.6% | 2 | |
| Fraternity and Peaceful Coexistence List | 17,651 | 4.5% | 2 | Massoud Barzani, Jalal Talebani |
| State of Law Coalition | 14,422 | 3.5% | 2 | Nouri al-Maliki |
| Other parties | | 21% | 0 | |
| Total | 403,764 | 100% | 28 | |

=== Wasit Governorate ===
| Party | Total votes | Percentage | Seats | Party leader |
|---|---|---|---|---|
| State of Law Coalition | 47,835 | 15.3% | 13 | Nouri al-Maliki |
| al-Mehrab Martyr List (ISCI) | 30,712 | 10.0% | 6 | Abdul Aziz al-Hakim |
| Independent Free Movement | 18,261 | 6.0% | 3 | Muqtada al-Sadr |
| Iraqi National List | 14,596 | 4.6% | 3 | Ayad Allawi |
| Iraqi Constitutional Party | 12,235 | 3.9% | 3 | Jawad al-Bulani |
| Other parties | | 60.2% | 0 | |
| Total | 310,194 | 100% | 28 | |

== Coalitions ==
After the elections, the National Reform Trend said it has formed an agreement with the State of Law Coalition to ally in all provinces where they had won seats.

In Al Anbar, Qasim Al-Fahdawi, an independent from the Sahwa list was elected governor, he formed an administration with all parties in Anbar (most important being his own Sahwa list and al-Mutlaq's NIPG), except the Iraqi Islamic Party, which previously ruled the local government.

In Diyala the winning Iraqi Accord Front joined into a coalition with the Kurdistan Alliance, together holding a 15-seat majority out of the governorates 29 seats, they were also backed by the National Diyala Alliance, an ISCI affiliated list which held 2 seats. The Accord Front member Abdulnasir al-Muntasirbillah was elected as governor while Taleb Mohammed Hassan from the Kurdistan Alliance was made chairman of the provincial council. In Saladin, where Tawafuq also came out first they tied in number of seats with the Iraqi National List, which forged an alliance with State of Law and the National Iraqi Project Gathering, they were however eventually forced to include Tawafuq into this alliance in order to get a majority. Tawafuq member Mutashar al-Aliwi became governor while an INL member became chairman.

In Muthanna were State of Law and ISCI's al-Mehraab list each won 5 seats both parties created their own alliance forming blocs of 13 seats. State of Law formed a Coalition with the National Reform Trend (3 seats), Sadrists (2 seats) and the Middle Euphrates Gathering (2 seats) while ISCI created an alliance within the al-Jumhur List (3 seats), the Gathering for Muthanna (2 seats), and the Independent National List (2 seats). The Independent Iraqi Skills Gathering which had 2 seats was split between these two blocs. However Ibrahim Salman al-Miyali, an independent which ran as part of the State of Law Coalition left and joined ISCI's block because Maliki hadn't nominated him for any important position. This gave the ISCI block a 14-seat majority and led to his election as governor and ISCI member Abd al-Latif Hassan al-Hassani being elected as chairman.

In Maysan and Wasit, the State of Law Coalition formed a coalition with ISCI. Though in most governorates State of Law tried to leave ISCI out of local governments in Maysan where they won an equal amounth of seats they decided to align with them electing Muhammad al-Sudani of the Dawa Party as governor and Hashim al-Shawki of the Iraqi Hezbollah (which was part of ISCI's List) as chairman. In Wasit, State of Law first tried to create an alliance with the Sadrists but after this broke down, they formed an alliance with ISCI. Sadrist governor Latif Hamid Turfa was re-elected as governor and ISCI's Mahmoud Abdulrida Talal was made chairman.

In Basra, State of Law's clear cut majority allowed them to form an administration on their own, appointing Jabbar Amin, as chairman and Dr. Sheltagh Aboud Sherad as governor, both were members of the Da'wa party (although Jabbar Amin belongs to the Iraq Organisation branch). However, despite their 20-seat majority in the 35-seat council, they reached out to other parties including all other parties which won seats in the Basra local council in a local unity government.

In the remaining five Shi'a governorates, State of Law succeeded in creating coalitions without ISCI. In Babil State of Law created a broad coalition with the Sadrists, the National Reform Trend, the Iraqi National List, al-Mutlaq's bloc and local parties, ISCI forming a 7-seat opposition bloc with the 2 man Independent Ansar Bloc. To create this alliance however, State of Law gave Hasan al-Zarqani and Kadum Majid Tuman, two Sadrists, the positions of governor and chairman. In Dhi Qar State of Law aligned itself with the Sadrists and the National Reform Trend, creating a 24-seat majority in the 31-seat council, ISCI and Fadhila being left out. A Dawa member: Taleb al-Hassan was appointed governor and NRT member Qusai al-Ibadi became chairman. In Karbala, the only Shi'a province were SOL did not come out first place, they aligned themselves with al-Haboubi an independent which won the most votes, the second place Hope of Al-Refedein and the Independent Free Movement, two Sadrist blocs which together took 13 seats, only ISCI's 4-seat bloc was left out of the local government. Amaleddin Majeed Hameed Kadhem of the Dawa party became governor while Mohammed Hamid al-Musawi, a Sadrist was elected chairman. In Najaf, SOL and ISCI tied with 7 seats each however SOL managed to create a 15-seat majority bloc with the NRT and two local parties, leaving the Sadrists and ISCI in the opposition. SOL member Fayad al-Shamari was appointed chairman and despite strong opposition, Adnan al-Zurfi from one of the local parties became the new governor, prompting Asaad Abu Gulal the former ISCI governor to start a legal battle against al-Zurfi. In al-Qadisiyah SOL formed a bloc with the Iraqi National List, leaving ISCI, Fadhila and the Sadrists in the opposition. Da'awa members Salim Hussein and Jubeir al-Juburi were appointed governor and chairman.

== Fraud allegations ==
Allegations of election fraud came from both Sunni and Shi'a political parties. The most complaints came from Ayad Allawi's al-Iraqiya list which claimed election fraud had taken place, mostly in Baghdad, Salahaddin and al-Anbar, a spokesman of the group: Ali Nesaif claimed that "Some boxes were stolen from polling centers in Salahaddin as well as Diyala," while Kadhim Turki another Allawi ally said that they were not satisfied with the final results—particularly in Baghdad and Basra." They accused the counties powerful parties of vote rigging.

The Sadr Movement also complained about the election results, Amir Tahar al-Kinani a Sadrist spokesman released the following statement: "We have been mistreated in this election. IHEC was not fair—it was biased in favor of other lists, in the final results, we dropped to third position, while SIIC took second place. How can that happen? Our bloc and SIIC won an approximately equal number of votes in Maysan—yet we only got seven seats, while they got eight." Kinani also said their votes in Baghdad suspiciously dropped after the final results came in and he accused the Independent High Electoral Commission of making late changes to the law which benefited Maliki. He also claimed that: "There are huge differences between results announced by the electoral commission and the figures we have from our observers in some provinces."

The Iraq Awakening Coalition alleged election fraud in al-Anbar province claiming they had hundreds of documents to prove the fraud. Iraqi Vice President Tariq al-Hashimi called for a vote recount in al-Anbar.

Meanwhile, radical Arab Nationalist and Sunni MP Mithal al-Alusi claimed that hundreds of thousands of voters had been denied the right to vote. This was confirmed by Ahmad Challabi who claimed it was not intentional but "a shortcoming in the electoral commission's preparations". Al-Alusi however also alleged Iranian diplomats were allowed into Iraqi polling stations and accused them of interfering in the polls.

Both the al-Iraqiya list and the Sadr Movement contested the results in court while the Supreme Iraqi Islamic Council contested the results in Baghdad while the Awakening Movements contested the results in Al Anbar. In total election committee officials received 1,000 complaints of irregularities, including 20 serious allegations of fraud and that serious violations had been reported in Anbar, Diyala, Mosul, Muthanna and in Baghdad. He however claimed that most lists provided no proof for their fraud allegations. Some voters however claimed to have witnessed fraud at the polling stations.
