= 2013 Wasit governorate election =

2013 regional election in Iraq

| ← 2009 | 20 April 2013 | 2017 → |

All 28 seats for the Wasit Governorate council
Governor of Wasit before election
Lateef Hamad al-Tarf
Independent
Subsequent Governor
TBD

The Wasit governorate election of 2013 was held on 20 April 2013 alongside elections for all other governorates outside Iraqi Kurdistan, Kirkuk, Anbar, and Nineveh.

== Results ==
Summary of the 20 April 2013 Wasit governorate election results
| Party/Coalition | Allied national parties | Leader | Seats | Change | Votes |
|---|---|---|---|---|---|
| State of Law Coalition | | Nouri Al-Maliki | 7 | | 96,664 |
| Citizens Alliance | | Ammar al-Hakim | 7 | | 86,403 |
| Liberal Coalition | | Muqtada al-Sadr | 5 | | 63,584 |
| Loyal Hands' Gathering | | | 2 | | 29,969 |
| Social Justice State | | | 2 | | 28,446 |
| Iraq’s Benevolence and Generosity List | | | 1 | | 13,678 |
| Al Iraqia National and United Coalition | | Ayad Allawi | 1 | | 13,055 |
| Equitable State Movement | | | 1 | | 8,447 |
| Civil Democratic Alliance in Wasit | | | 1 | | 8,420 |
| Feylis Kurds Brotherhood List | | | 1 | | 2,212 |
| Feylis Kurds Pledge Bloc | | | | | 1,618 |
| Iraq Cadres Bloc | | | | | 1,563 |
| Law Advocate Knights' Bloc | | | | | 1,399 |
| Baqer Jasem Al Hassan | | | | | 817 |
| Ismail Mohamed Hassan (Abe Know) | | | | | 402 |
| Total | | | 28 | | 356,677 |
Sources: al-Sumaria - Wasit Coalitions, ISW, IHEC
