= 2013 Karbala governorate election =

← 2009	20 April 2013	2017 →

All 27 seats for the Karbala Governorate council
Governor of Karbala before election
Amaleddin Majeed Hameed Kadhem
State of Law
Subsequent Governor
TBD

The Karbala governorate election of 2013 was held on 20 April 2013 alongside elections for all other governorates outside Iraqi Kurdistan, Kirkuk, Anbar, and Nineveh.

== Results ==
Summary of the 20 April 2013 Karbala governorate election results
Party/Coalition	Allied national parties	Leader	Seats	Change	Votes
State of Law Coalition		Nouri Al-Maliki	7		84,447
Liberal Coalition		Muqtada al-Sadr	4		43,945
Al Liwa			3		33,614
Citizens Alliance		Ammar al-Hakim	3		33,362
Hope for the Mesopotamia			3		32,527
Equitable State Movement			3		32,454
National Moderation Front			2		18,501
Iraq’s Advocates for State Support			1		13,102
Iraqi Justice and Democracy Alliance			1		8,559
Karbala’s Independent Council of Tribe Chiefs and Dignitaries					5,250
Al Iraqia National and United Coalition		Ayad Allawi			4,887
Al Nahrayn Unity					4,868
Karbala Houses Gathering					2,886
Iraq’s Benevolence and Generosity List					2,428
Free Iraqi Bloc					2,150
Al Nahrayn National Movement					746
Total			27		323,726
Sources: al-Sumaria - Karbala Coalitions, ISW, IHEC
