= 2013 Babil governorate election =

2013 Babil Governorate election
| ← 2009 | 20 April 2013 | 2017 → |

All 24 seats for the Babil Governorate council
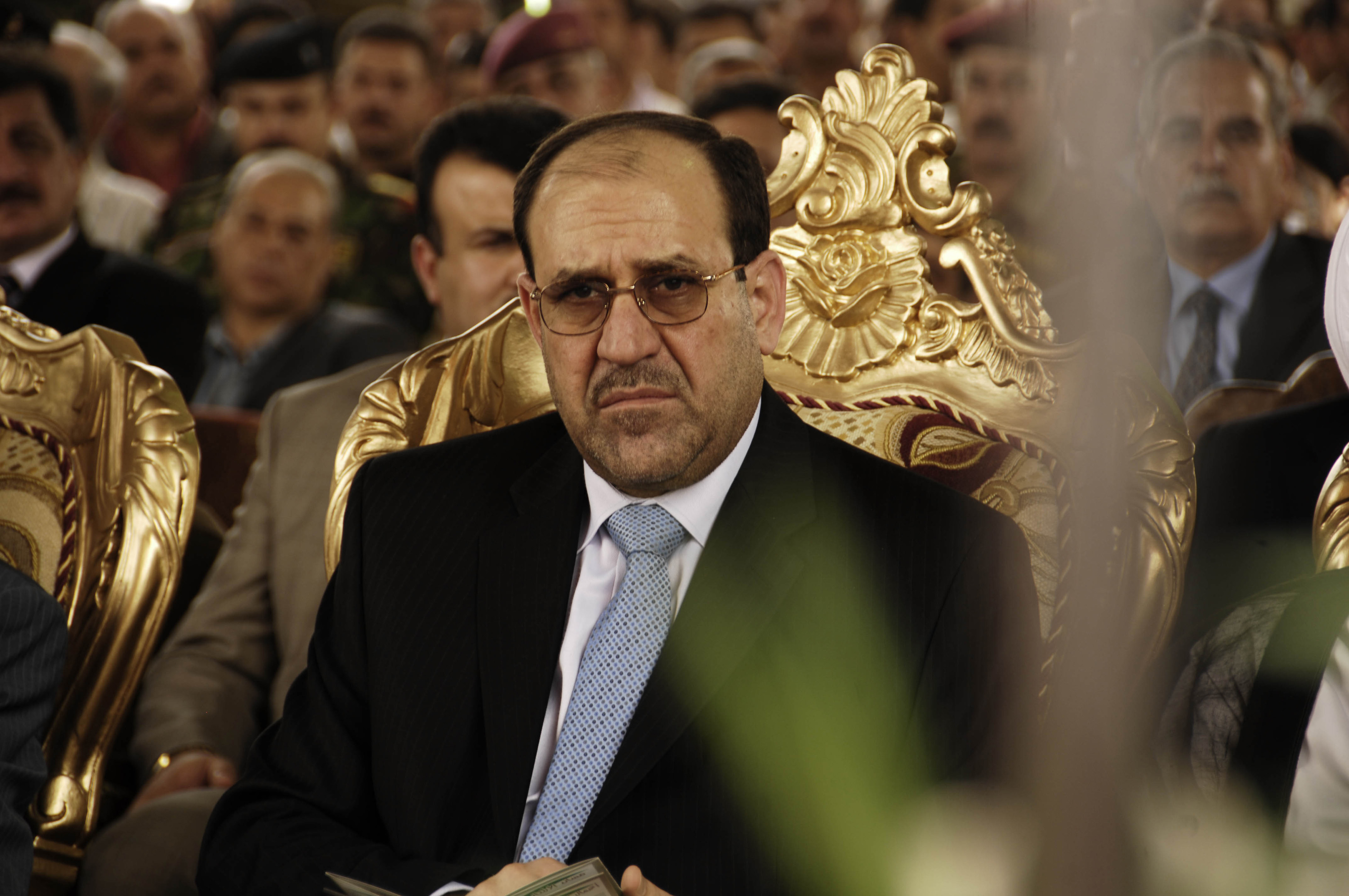
| | First party | Second party |
|---|---|---|
| Leader | Nouri al-Maliki | Ammar al-Hakim |
| Party | State of Law | Al-Mehraab Martyr List |
| Last election | 0 | 0 |
| Seats before | 8 | 5 |
| Seats won | 8 | 7 |
| Seat change | - | ▲2 |
| | Third party |
| Leader | Muqtada al-Sadr |
| Party | Sadrist Movement |
| Last election | 3 |
| Seats before | 3 |
| Seats won | 4 |
| Seat change | ▲1 |
Governor of Babil before election
Salman Hassan al-Zarkani
Sadrist Movement
Subsequent Governor
TBD

The Babil governorate election of 2013 was held on 20 April 2013 alongside elections for all other governorates outside Iraqi Kurdistan, Kirkuk, Anbar, and Nineveh.

== Results ==
Summary of the 20 April 2013 Babil governorate election results
| Party/Coalition | Allied national parties | Leader | Seats | Change | Votes |
|---|---|---|---|---|---|
| State of Law Coalition | | Nouri Al-Maliki | 8 | - | 142,568 |
| Citizens Alliance | | Ammar al-Hakim | 7 | ▲2 | 115,188 |
| Independent Iraqi Qualifications Gathering | | | 4 | ▲4 | 69,087 |
| Liberal Coalition | | Muqtada al-Sadr | 4 | ▲1 | 51,869 |
| Babil Civil Alliance | | | 2 | ▲2 | 30,578 |
| Al Iraqia National and United Coalition | | | 1 | ▼2 | 24,227 |
| Iraq’s National Coalition | | | 1 | ▲1 | 20,755 |
| Islamic Dawa Party - Iraq Organization | | | 1 | ▲1 | 19,527 |
| National Partnership Gathering | | | 1 | ▲1 | 18,565 |
| Al Amin Coalition | | | 1 | ▲1 | 16,865 |
| Iraqia Babel | Muttahidoon; Arabian Al Iraqia | | 1 | ▲1 | 12,754 |
| Iraq’s Advocates for State Support | | | | | 11,798 |
| Iraq’s Benevolence and Generosity List | | | | | 4,849 |
| National Moderation Front | | | | | 3,580 |
| National White Bloc | | | | | 2,899 |
| Sons of the City Bloc | | | | | 2,002 |
| Iraqi Commission of Independent Civil Society Organizations | | | | | 1,560 |
| Total | | | 31 | - | 548,671 |
Sources: ISW, al-Sumaria - Babil Coalitions, IHEC Babil Results Archived 2013-06-12 at the Wayback Machine
