= Blameless =

Blameless could refer to:

- Blameless (band), a rock quartet formed in Sheffield, England, in 1993/94
- Blameless (novel), a 2010 steampunk novel by Gail Carriger

== See also ==
- Blamelessness and Reconstruction
