= Hasini =

Hasini may refer to:

- Abd al-Rahim al-Hasini, Iraqi politician
- Hasini Perera, Sri Lankan cricketer
- Hasinai, a Native American tribe
