= Nadim al-Jabiri =

Iraqi politician

Nadim al-Jabiri (born 1959) is an Iraqi politician and the former secretary-general of the Islamic Virtue Party, which at the time was a component of the United Iraqi Alliance until it left in March 2007. He left office following differences over the nomination of Ibrahim al-Jaafari to head the new Iraqi government, and was succeeded as secretary-general by Abd al-Rahim al-Hasini in May 2006.

Nadim al-Jabiri also worked as professor of politics at Baghdad University.
