= 2009 Wasit governorate election =

2009 Iraq elections

2009 Wasit Governorate election
← 2005	31 January 2009	Next →

All 28 seats for the Wasit Governorate council
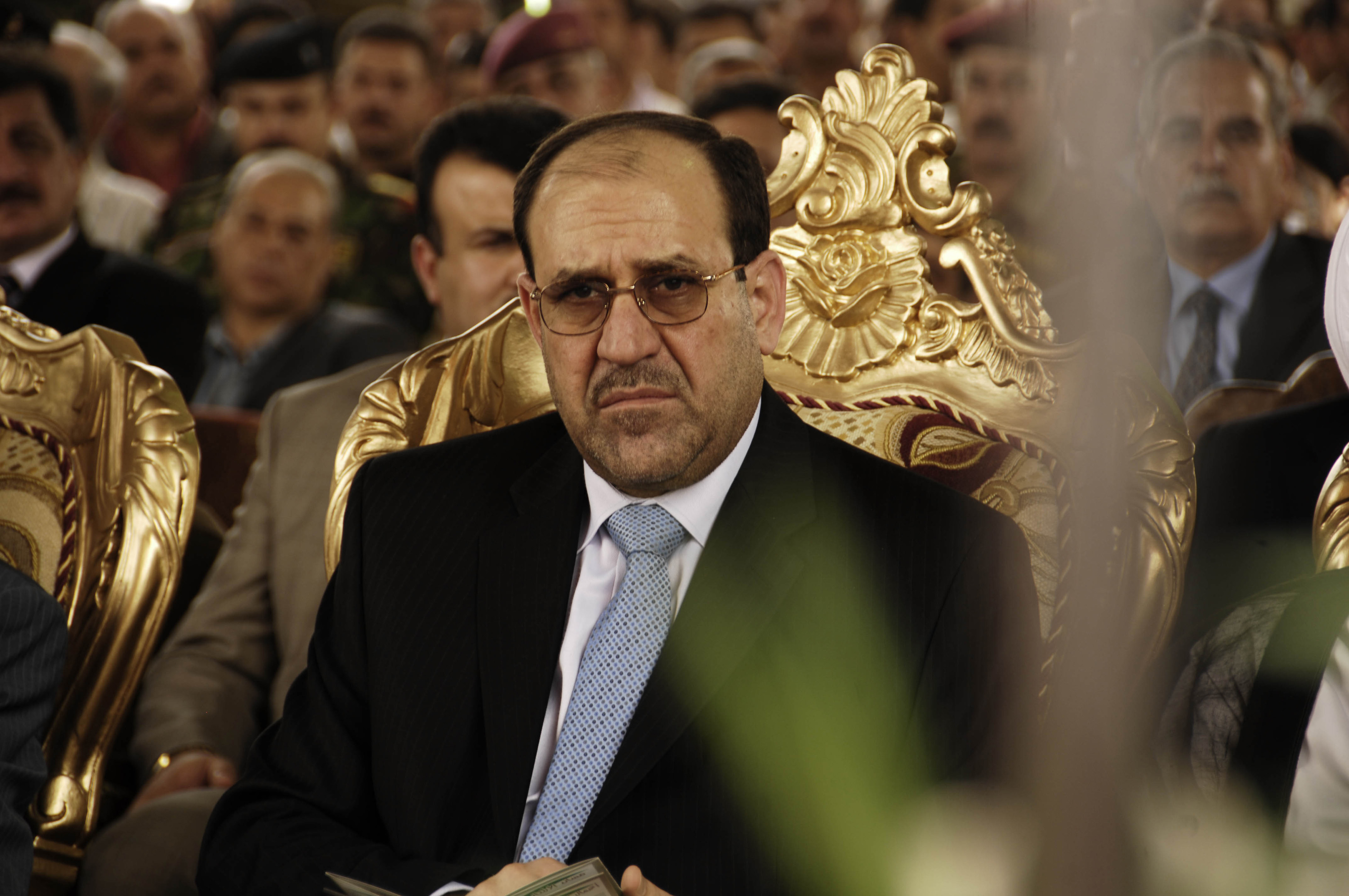

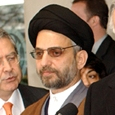

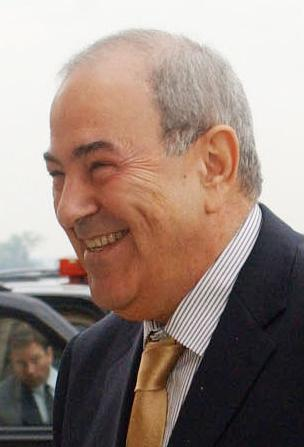
	First party	Second party
Leader	Nouri al-Maliki	Abdul Aziz al-Hakim
Party	State of Law	Al-Mehraab Martyr List
Last election	2	2
Seats before	2	2
Seats won	13	6
Seat change	▲11	▲4
Popular vote	47,835	30,712
Percentage	15.42%	9.90%
Swing	▲	▲
	Third party	Fourth party
Leader	Muqtada al-Sadr	Ayad Allawi
Party	Sadrist Movement	INL
Last election	31	0
Seats before	31	0
Seats won	3	3
Seat change	▼28	▲3
Popular vote	18,261	14,596
Percentage	5.89%	4.71%
Swing	▼	▲
Governor of Wasit before election
Latif Hamid Turfa
Sadrist Movement
Subsequent Governor
Lateef Hamad al-Tarfa
Independent

The Wasit governorate election of 2009 was held on 31 January 2009 alongside elections for all other governorates outside Iraqi Kurdistan and Kirkuk.

== Results ==
In March, the State of Law Coalition was rumoured to have allied with the Independent Free Movement List and the Iraqi National List.

Summary of the 31 January 2009 Wasit governorate election results
Coalition	Allied national parties	Seats (2005)	Seats (2009)	Change	Votes	Percentage	Party Leader
Shi’ite Political Council; State of Law Coalition	Islamic Dawa Party	4	13	+15	47,835	15.42%	Nouri al-Maliki
Shi’ite Political Council; Al Mihrab Martyr List	Islamic Supreme Council of Iraq	4	6	+15	30,712	9.90%	Abdul Aziz al-Hakim
Iraqi Elites Gathering; Independent Free Movement List	Sadrist Movement	31	3	-28	18,261	5.89%	Muqtada al-Sadr
Iraqi National List		-	3	+3	14,596	4.71%	Ayad Allawi
Iraqi Constitutional Party		-	3	+3	12,235	3.94%	Jawad al-Bulani
Gathering of the Independents in Wasit		3	-	-3			
Iraqi Communist Party		2	-	-2			
Democratic Iraq Gathering		1	-	-1			
Total		41	28	-13	310,194	100%	
Sources: this article -
