= 2013 Dhi Qar governorate election =

← 2009	20 April 2013	2017 →

All 31 seats for the Dhi Qar Governorate council
Governor of Dhi Qar before election
Taleb Kazem Abdulkarim al-Hassan
State of Law
Subsequent Governor
TBD

The Dhi Qar governorate election of 2013 was held on 20 April 2013 alongside elections for all other governorates of Iraq outside Iraqi Kurdistan, Kirkuk, Anbar, and Nineveh.

== Results ==
Summary of the 20 April 2013 Dhi Qar governorate election results
Party/Coalition	Allied national parties	Leader	Seats	Change	Votes
State of Law Coalition		Nouri Al-Maliki	10	▼3	176,861
Citizens Alliance		Ammar al-Hakim	7	▲2	122,088
Liberal Coalition		Muqtada al-Sadr	7	-	81,338
Solidarity with Iraq		Talib Qathem Abdul Karim Al Hassan	3		50,363
National Loyalty Bloc		Habib Nour Mahdi Nehme	3		43,369
National Partnership Gathering		Hamid naim Khudayr Abdullah	2		26,670
Civil Democratic Coalition		Shahid Ahmad Hassan Mohamed	1		17,906
Al Iraqia National and United Coalition		Ayad Allawi			6,855
Law Advocate Knights' Bloc					5,698
Iraq’s Benevolence and Generosity List					3,167
Total			31	▲1	534,315
Sources: al-Sumaria - Dhi Qar Coalitions, ISW, IHEC
