= Independent Trend of the Noble Ones =

The Independent Trend of the Noble Ones list (Arabic: Tayyar al-ahrar al-mustaqill) (284) is a political coalition formed for the Iraqi governorate elections of 2009. The list was not officially part of a political party but was aligned with the Sadrist Movement and one of several lists supported by its parliamentary bloc.
