= 2013 Al-Qādisiyyah governorate election =

- 20 April 2013

All 28 seats for the Al-Qādisiyyah Governorate council
Governor of Al-Qādisiyyah before election
Salim Husayn
State of Law
Subsequent Governor
TBD

The Al-Qādisiyyah governorate election of 2013 was held on 20 April 2013 alongside elections for all other governorates outside Iraqi Kurdistan, Kirkuk, Anbar, and Nineveh.

== Results ==
Summary of the 20 April 2013 Al-Qādisiyyah governorate election results
Party/Coalition	Allied national parties	Leader	Seats	Change	Votes
State of Law Coalition		Nouri Al-Maliki	8		114,697
Citizens Alliance		Ammar al-Hakim	5		66,691
Liberal Coalition		Muqtada al-Sadr	4	-	50,544
Al Diwaniyah People's Independent Coalition		Jaafar Mussa Zaalan Hachem	4		49,831
National White Bloc			2		33,092
Islamic Dawa Party - Iraq Organization			2		29,517
Loyalty to Iraq Coalition			1		11,207
Al Diwaniyah's Civil Alliance			1		9,472
Equitable State Movement			1		8,141
New Dawn Bloc					3,558
Al Iraqia National and United Coalition		Ayad Allawi			3,311
Iraq's Benevolence and Generosity List					2,217
Islamic Advocates' Party					1,979
Al Diwaniyah's Will Coalition					1,829
Total			28		386,086
Sources: al-Sumaria - Al-Qādisiyyah Coalitions, ISW, IHEC Archived 2016-03-04 at the Wayback Machine
