= Blamelessness and Reconstruction =

The Blamelessness and Reconstruction list (376/731) is a political coalition formed for the Iraqi governorate elections of 2009. The list was not officially part of a political party but was aligned to the Sadrist Movement and supported by its parliamentary bloc.

The lists ran across southern Iraq and placed professionals and academics high on the list. In Maysan Governorate, three Sadrist Movement council members were placed top. It was also described as a "pro-Sadrist" list in Dhi Qar Governorate.
