= Baghdad of Peace =

Baghdad of Peace (Arabic: بغداد السلام, Baghdad as-salam) was an electoral alliance in Baghdad, Iraq, formed on the initiative of the Islamic Dawa Party.

The alliance consisted of:

- Islamic Dawa Party
- Islamic Dawa Party - Iraq Organisation
- Islamic Action Organisation
- Islamic Union for the Fayli Kurds of Iraq
- Islamic Vanguard Party

The bloc fielded 51 candidates in the 2005 election to the Baghdad Governorate Council. The alliance got 264,130 votes. Eleven members were able to get elected, making the bloc the second largest in the Council.
