= Mohammed Ali al-Hasani =

Iraqi politician

Governor of Al Muthanna Province

Personal details
- Died: 20 August 2007 Samawa, Iraq
- Party: Supreme Islamic Iraqi Council (SIIC)
- Profession: Politician

Mohammed Ali al-Hasani was the governor of Iraq's southern Al Muthanna province until he was killed by a roadside bomb on August 20, 2007. He was a member of the Supreme Islamic Iraqi Council (SIIC), one of the biggest Shia party in Iraq, whose armed wing is the Badr Organization. Al Diwaniyah governor Khalil Jalil Hamza, who was also a member of SIIC, was killed along with the province's police chief Major General Khaled Hassan earlier on August 11, 2007.
