= Hezbollah Movement in Iraq =

Hezbollah Movement in Iraq حركة حزب الله في العراق
- Secretary-General: Hassan Al-Sari
- Founded: 1983; May 2008 (political party)
- Headquarters: Baghdad, Iraq
- Newspaper: Al-Bayyna
- Military wing: Saraya al-Jihad (1983–)
- Ideology: Shi'a Islamism; Qutbism–Khomeinism
- National affiliation: United Iraqi Alliance (formally); Fatah Alliance (2018–present)
- Seats in the Council of Representatives of Iraq: 0 / 328
- Seats in the local governorate councils: 0 / 440

Party flag

Website
- www.algalibon.net

The Hezbollah Movement in Iraq (Arabic: حركة حزب الله في العراق), also known as the Jihad and Construction Movement (Arabic: حركة الجهاد والبناء), is a Shi'a Islamist Iraqi political party that is part of the United Iraqi Alliance coalition. It is not affiliated with the Lebanese group Hezbollah or other groups using the name. Hezbollah or Hizb Allah (Arabic: حزب الله) means "Party of God" in Arabic.

The party publishes the Al-Bayyna newspaper and is led by Hassan Al-Sari. Hezbollah originated as an underground anti-Saddam network. Unlike other anti-Saddam groups it remained in Iraq, not setting up other bases in Iran or the West. The party is closely aligned to the Islamic Supreme Council of Iraq.

== History ==
=== Post-invasion ===
Following the 2003 invasion of Iraq, the Hezbollah Movement seized buildings formerly used by the Iraqi General Intelligence Service in the al-Alwiya neighborhood of Baghdad. On 16 August 2004, INIS & Major Crimes Directorate personnel raided the building with support from forces wearing American clothing. Conflicting reports identified the forces as either the Iraqi National Guard or U.S. forces. Present Hezbollah staff and officials, including Secretary-General Hassan Al-Sari, were arrested and detained for periods ranging from 10 days to 2 months. During this time they were interrogated over the group's links to Iran .

== See also ==
- List of Islamic political parties
