= Khalil Jalil Hamza =

Governor of Al-Qādisiyyah province, Iraq

Khalil Jalil Hamza (died August 11, 2007) was the governor of Al-Qādisiyyah province, Iraq. He was assassinated on August 11, 2007, along with the province's police chief Major General Khaled Hassan. He was a member of the Supreme Islamic Iraqi Council (SIIC), the biggest Shia party in Iraq. Al Muthanna governor Mohammed Ali al-Hasani, who was also a member of SIIC, was killed later in the month on August 20, 2007.
