= Asaad Abu Gilel al-Taie =

Iraqi politician (born 1952)

Governor Asaad Abu Gilel al-Taie

Governor of Najaf
- In office 30 January 2005 – 31 January 2009
- Deputy: Abd al-Husayn Abtan
- Preceded by: Adnan al-Zurufi
- Succeeded by: Adnan al-Zurufi

Personal details
- Born: 1952 (age 73–74) Al-Najaf, Iraq
- Party: Islamic Supreme Council of Iraq
- Children: 7
- Education: Baghdad University

Asaad Abu Gilel al-Taie (born March 3, 1952) is the former SCIRI governor of Najaf province, in Iraq. He now works as the Head of Africa Department at the Headquarters of Iraqi Ministry of Foreign Affairs. He has Finnish citizenship, because he and his family have lived there as refugees since the 1990s.

== Marriage and children ==
He has seven children.

- Hussein al-Taee is the oldest child. He was elected to the Finnish Parliament 2019.
