= 2005 Iraqi governorate elections =

Post invasion Iraqi governorate elections

- 30 January 2005

All 748 seats to the councils for the 18 governorates of Iraq
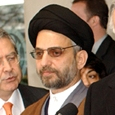

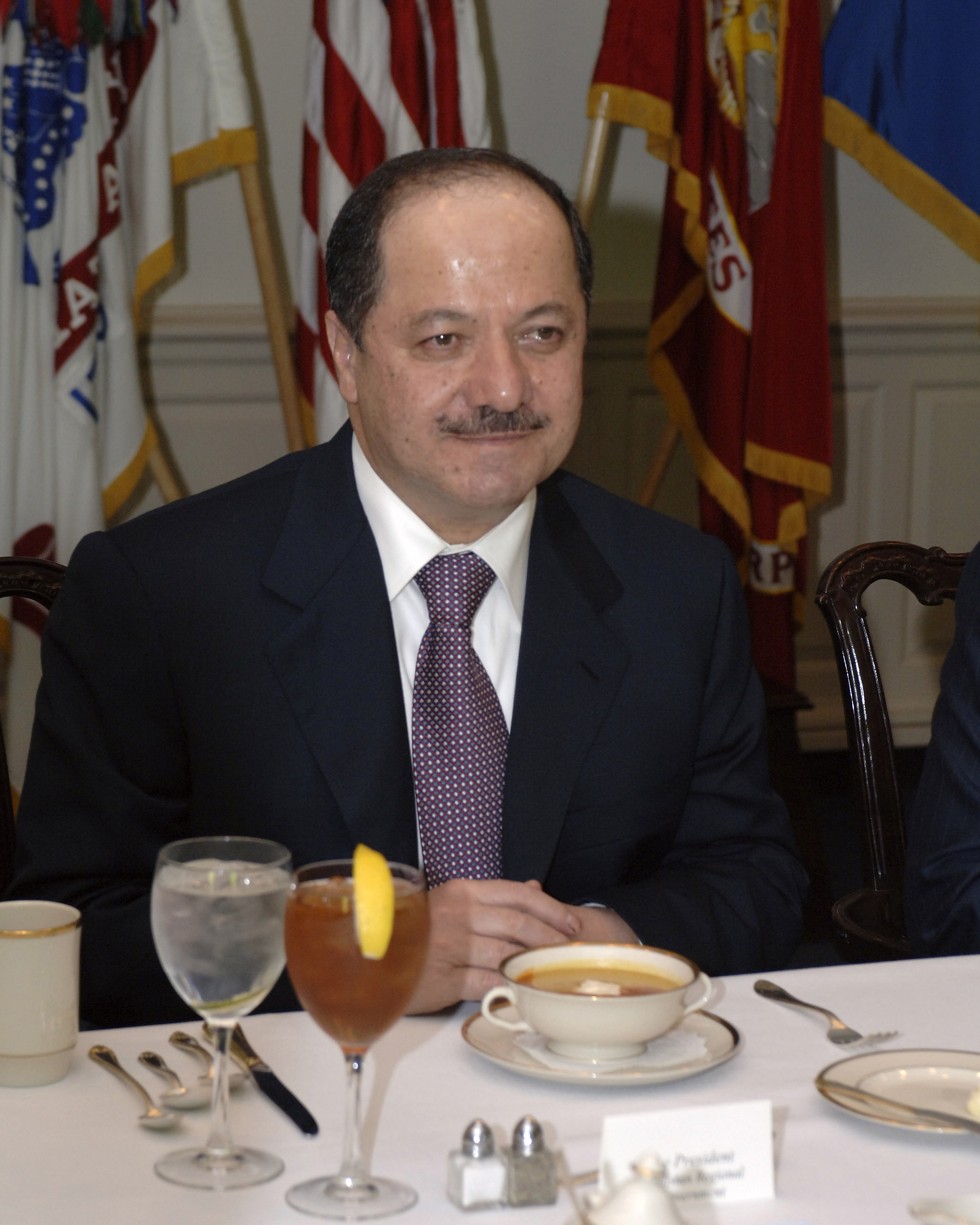

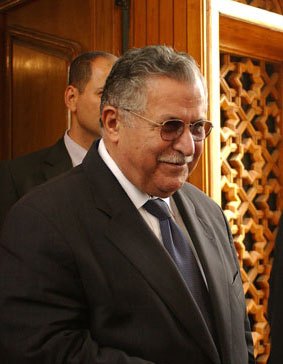

	First party	Second party	Third party
Leader	Abdul Aziz al-Hakim	Massoud Barzani	Jalal Talabani
Party	ISCI	KDP	PUK
Last election	-	-	-
Seats won	195	91	80
Seat change	▲195	▲91	▲80
Governors	7	2	2
Governors +/–	▲7	▲2	▲2
	Fourth party
Leader	Muqtada al-Sadr
Party	Sadrist Movement
Seats won	60
Seat change	▲60
Governors	2
Governors +/–	▲2
- Colours show the largest party per governorate

Governorate council elections were held in Iraq on 30 January 2005, the same day as the elections for the transitional Iraqi National Assembly. The Governorate for each province has a 41-member council, except for Baghdad, whose council has 51 members.

A summary of the results by governorate was:

== Total ==
=== National results ===
Party	Total seats	Party leader
Supreme Council for Islamic Revolution in Iraq	195	Abdel Aziz al-Hakim
Kurdistan Democratic Party	91	Massoud Barzani
Patriotic Union of Kurdistan	80	Jalal Talabani
Sadr Movement	60	Muqtada al-Sadr
al-Fadhila Islamic Party	49	Abdelrahim Al-Husseini
Iraqi Islamic Party	45	Tariq al-Hashemi
Islamic Da'awa Party	42	Ibrahim al-Jaafari
Iraqi National Accord	18	Iyad Allawi
Kurdistan Islamic Union	10	Salaheddine Bahaaeddin
Reconciliation and Liberation Bloc	10	Misha'an al-Juburi
Iraqi Communist Party	8	Hamid Majid Mousa
Iraqi Republican Group	7	
Other Parties	133	-
Total	748	-

=== Governors ===
Governorate	Governor	Party
Anbar	Maamoon Sami Rasheed al-Alwani	IIP
Erbil	Nawzad Hadi Mawlood	KDP
Babil	Salem al-Saleh Meslmawe	SCIRI
Baghdad	Hussain al-Tahan	SCIRI
Basra	Muhammad al-Waili	Fadhila
Dahuk	Tamar Ramadan	KDP
Dhi Qar	Aziz Kadum Alwan al-Ogheli	SCIRI
Diyala	Hameed al-Mula al-Tamimi	Badr
Karbala	Uqeil al-Khazaali	SCIRI
Kirkuk	Abdul Rahman Mustafa	PUK
Maysan	Adil Mahwadar Radi	Sadrists
Muthanna	Muhammad Ali Hassan Abbas al-Hassani	SCIRI
Najaf	Asaad Abu Gilel al-Taie	SCIRI
Nineveh	Usama Yousif Kashmula	Independent
al-Qadisiyyah	Khalil Jalil Hamza	SCIRI
Saladin	Hamed Hamood Shekti al-Qaisi	unknown
Sulaymaniyah	Dana Ahmed Majid	PUK
Wasit	Latif Hamid Turfa	Sadrists

== Al Anbar Governorate ==
Party	Arabic name	Votes	Percent	Seats (probable)
Iraqi Islamic Party	al-Hizb al-Islami al-Airaqi	2692	71.3%	29
Independent Iraqi Group	al-Hia al-Airaqia al-Mustaqila	755	20%	8
Reconciliation and Liberation Bloc	Kutla al-Musalaha wa at-Tahrir	328	8.7%	4
Total valid votes:		3775	100%	41
Invalid votes:		28		

The council elected Maamoon Sami Rasheed al-Alwani as governor.

== Babil Governorate ==
List	Parties	Votes	Seats
Faithful Iraqis Association	SCIRI; Badr	192,643	25
Al-Rasul Association	Sadr Movement	43,226	6
Imam Ali Society		41,607	6
Security & Reconstruction		17,295	2
Babil Independent Association		15,779	2
Total		494,054	41

The council elected Salem al-Saleh Meslmawe as the governor.

== Baghdad Governorate ==
List	Parties	Votes	Seats
Baghdad Nation	SCIRI; Badr Organisation	694,800	28
Baghdad Peace	Islamic Dawa Party; Islamic Dawa Iraq	264,130	11
Fadhila		156,229	6
National Democratic Alliance		46,265	2
Iraqi Communist Party		36,713	2
National Independent Cadres and Elites	Sadr Movement	35,441	1
Independent al-Baya Gathering		34,366	1
Total		1,750,772	51

The council elected SCIRI member, Hussain al-Tahan as governor.

== Basra Governorate ==
List	Parties	Votes	Seats	%
Islamic Basra	SCIRI; 6 others	235,704	20	33.05%
Islamic Virtue Party		150,823	12	21.15%
Iraqi National Accord		49,005	4	6.87%
Islamic Dawa Party		37,997	3	5.33%
Iraqi Independent List		21,236	2	2.98%
Other parties		218,506	-	30.63%
Total Valid		713,271	41	100%
Invalid ballots		7,733		
Source: Washington Institute

The council elected Fadhila member Mohammed al-Waili as governor. In April 2007, SIIC successfully brought a no-confidence motion against Waili. This dismissal was ratified by Prime Minister Nouri al-Maliki in July.

== Dhi Qar Governorate ==
List	Parties	Votes	Seats	%
Islamic Virtue Party		103,114	12	19.74%
Supreme Iraq Islamic Council	SCIRI	100,237	5	19.19%
Islamic Dawa Party - Iraq Organisation		89,263	3	17.09%
Iraqi National Accord		20,767	4	3.98%
Islamic Movement of the 15th of Shaaban		19,709	4	3.77%
Iraqi Communist Party		18,769	4	3.59%
Iraqi Independent Gathering		15,531	4	2.97%
Independent Coalition for the Care of Democracy		13,880	4	2.66%
Other parties		141,001	-	27.00%
Total		522,271	41	100%
Invalid ballots		4,707		
Source: Washington Institute

The council elected Aziz Kadum Alwan al-Ogheli, a SCIRI member, as governor.

== Diyala Governorate ==
List	Parties	Votes	Seats
Coalition of Islamic & National Forces in Diyala	SCIRI; Islamic Dawa Party	84,390	20
Iraqi Islamic Party		55,960	14
Kurdish Arabic Turkmen Democratic Coalition - Diyala Governorate	KDP; PUK	30,268	7
Total		210,574	41

The council elected Ra'ad Hameed Al-Mula Jowad Al-Tamimi, a Badr Brigades leader, as governor.

Source - http://www.washingtoninstitute.org/html/newsletterImages/PF81Annexes.pdf

== Karbala Governorate ==
List	Votes	Seats
SCIRI & Badr	101,932	21
al-Fadhila Islamic Party	22,085	5
Shi'a Political Council	10,655	2
Democratic Progressive Gathering	9,698	2
Independent Council of Tribal Shaykhs & Notables of Karbala Governorate	9,647	2
Iraqi Democratic Current	9,161	2
Independent Unified List for the Governorate of Holy Karbala	8,719	2
Democratic Meeting for Holy Karbala	7,605	2
Independent Intellectuals Gathering	7,233	2
Dr. Abbas al-Hasnawi	8,621	1
Total	297,201	41

The council elected SCIRI member Uqeil al-Khazaali as governor.

== Kirkuk Governorate ==
List	Parties	Votes	Seats	%
List of Kurdistan Brotherhood	KDP; PUK; 5 others	237,303	26	59.19%
Iraqi Turkmen Front		73,791	8	18.41%
Iraqi Republican Group	(Sunni Arab)	43,635	5	10.88%
The Islamic Turkoman Coalition		12,678	1	3.16%
National Iraqi Gathering	(Sunni Arab)	12,329	1	3.08%
Other parties		21,156	-	5.28%
Total Valid		400,892	41	100%
Invalid ballots		5,059		
Source: Washington Institute

The council re-elected Abdulrahman Mustapha Fatah as governor, who had served since the 2003 invasion of Iraq

== Maysan Governorate ==
List	Parties	Votes	Seats	%
Al-Hussayni Thought Forum	Sadrist Movement	109,295	15	44.26%
Islamic Unified Front	SCIRI	28,211	6	11.42%
Islamic Dawa Party - Iraq Organization		25,388	5	10.28%
Islamic Virtue Party		20,379	4	8.25%
Al-Rida Center for Culture & Guidance		13,410	3	5.43%
Gathering of the Independent Sons of Maysan		9,674	2	3.92%
Iraqi Republican Group		7,560	2	3.06%
Islamic Dawa Party		7,006	1	2.84%
Maysan Democratic Coalition		6,833	1	2.77%
Shi’ite Political Council		6,558	1	2.66%
Independent National Islamic Congregation		6,201	1	2.51%
Other parties		6,442	-	2.61%
Total Valid		246,957	41	100%
Invalid ballots		1,559		
Source: Washington Institute

Adel Mahudar Radi, a former Mahdi Army commander, was elected governor.

== Muthanna Governorate ==
List	Votes	Seats
Supreme Council for the Islamic Revolution in Iraq	23,918	8
Al-Fadhila Islamic Party	18,206	6
Al-Furat al-Awsat Assembly (part of INL)	17,924	6
Islamic Independent Society	14,550	5
Islamic Dawa Party	13,354	4
Gathering for al-Muthanna	12,687	4
Allegiance Coalition	10,221	3
Iraqi National Accord (part of INL)	7,530	3
Iraqi Communist Party	5,602	2
Total	173,155	41

The Governorate Council elected SCIRI member Mohammed Ali al-Hasani as the provincial Governor, and an Islamic Dawa Party member, Ahmad Marzouq Salal as the council president. al-Hasani was assassinated in August 2007 in an attack blamed on the Mahdi Army, and the council elected Marzouq his successor, with an SCIRI member becoming the council president.

== Najaf Governorate ==
List	Votes	Seats
SCIRI & Badr	133,676	19
Loyalty to Al-Najaf	64,837	9
Banner of the Independents	26,585	4
Iraqi National Accord	23,663	3
Fadhila	15,999	2
Allegiance Coalition	13,464	2
Iraq Future Gathering	11,513	2
Total	359268	41

The council elected SCIRI member Asaad Abu Gilel al-Taie as governor.

== Nineveh Governorate ==
List	Parties	Votes	Seats	%
Democratic Patriotic Alliance of Kurdistan	KDP; PUK	109,295	31	65.87%
Supreme Iraq Islamic Council	SCIRI	17,255	5	10.40%
Iraqi Islamic Party		7,065	2	4.26%
Council of the United Clans of Mosul		6,624	2	3.99%
National Rafidain List	ADM	4,650	1	2.80%
Other parties		21,045	-	12.68%
Total		165,934	41	100%
Invalid ballots		864		

The council voted for the independent Sunni Arab, Duraid Kashmoula, to continue as governor. His brother, Usama Yousif Kashmula, had been appointed as governor of Nineveh Governorate in 2003 by the Coalition Provisional Authority, and Duraid succeeded Usama after he was assassinated in July 2004.

== Al-Qādisiyyah Governorate ==
List	Parties	Votes	Seats	%
Martyr of the Sanctuary Sayyid Muhammad Baqir al-Hakim	SCIRI & Badr	102,005	20	30.25%
Shiite Political Council		26,898	5	7.98%
Islamic Da'awa Party		15,446	3	4.58%
Iraqi National Accord		15,396	3	4.57%
al-Fadhila Islamic Party		14,606	3	4.33%
Independent Brotherhood	Sadrist Movement	14,485	3	4.30%
Islamic Dawa Party - Iraq Organization		10,854	2	3.22%
Loyalty to Iraq Coalition	Sadrist Movement	8,052	2	2.39%
Total		337,220	41	100%

The Governorate Council chose SCIRI members Khalil Jalil Hamza as the governor and Sheikh Hamid al-Khodari as council president. Hamza was assassinated in August 2007 in an attack blamed on the Mahdi Army. al-Khodari was elected to replace Hamza as governor.

== Saladin Governorate ==
List	Parties	Total votes	Seats
List of the Unified Democratic Coalition in Salah al-Din Governorate	Kurdistan Democratic Party; Patriotic Union of Kurdistan	22,160	8
Reconciliation and Liberation Bloc		17,017	6
Coalition for Iraqi National Unity		13,321	5
Iraqi Turkmen Front		14,917	5
Unified List		12,815	4
Iraqi National Accord	Iraqi Islamic Party; Iraqi National Dialogue Council	10,215	3
Islamic Da'awa Party		8,691	3
National Iraqi Gathering		8,641	3
Gathering of Independents in Salah al-Din		4,739	2
National al-Risaliya List	Sadrist Movement	6,133	2
Total		137,476	41

The council elected Hamed Hamood Shekti al-Qaisi as governor.

== Wasit Governorate ==
List	Parties	Votes	Seats
Iraqi Elites Gathering	Sadr Movement	185,813	31
Shi'ite Political Council	SCIRI; Dawa	22,346	4
Gathering of the Independents in Wasit		16,518	3
Iraqi Communist Party		12,780	2
Democratic Iraq Gathering		9,010	1
Total		324,678	41

The council elected Latif Hamid Turfa, a Sadrist, as governor.

== Iraqi Kurdistan region ==
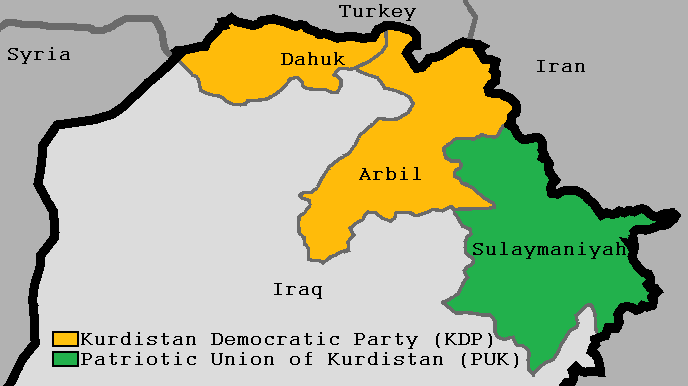
Map showing which party won most votes in which each province

=== Erbil Governorate ===
Party	Total votes	Seats
Kurdistan Democratic Party	347,772	23
Patriotic Union of Kurdistan	244,343	16
Islamic Union of Kurdistan	22,523	1
Islamic Group of Kurdistan	18,781	1
Other parties	14,575	0
Total votes	647,994	41

The council voted for Kurdistan Democratic Party member Nawzad Hadi Mawlood to become governor.

=== Dohuk Governorate ===
Party	Total votes	Seats
Kurdistan Democratic Party	302,133	33
Islamic Union of Kurdistan	35,675	4
Patriotic Union of Kurdistan	35,483	4
Other parties	9,974	0
Total votes	383,265	41

The council elected KDP member Tamar Ramadan as governor.

=== Sulaymaniyah Governorate ===
Party	Total votes	Seats
Patriotic Union of Kurdistan	485,718	28
Kurdistan Democratic Party	91,578	5
Islamic Union of Kurdistan	75,008	5
Islamic Group of Kurdistan	53,088	3
Kurdistan Communist Party	8,192	0
Other parties	17,739	0
Total votes	731,323	41

The council elected PUK member Dana Ahmed Majid as governor.
