= Adnan al-Zurfi =

Iraqi faqih and politician (born 1966)

Governor Adnan al-Zurufi عدنان الزرفي

Prime Minister of Iraq
- In office 17 March 2020 – 11 April 2020
- Preceded by: Mohammed Tawfiq Allawi
- Succeeded by: Mustafa Al-Kadhimi

Governor of Najaf
- Incumbent
- Assumed office 31 January 2009
- Preceded by: Asaad Abu Gilel al-Taie

Governor of Najaf
- In office 6 May 2004 – 30 January 2005
- Succeeded by: Asaad Abu Gilel al-Taie

Personal details
- Born: 1966 (age 59–60) Najaf, Iraq
- Party: Loyalty to Najaf
- Education: Alfik College

Adnan al-Zurfi was chosen as the new prime minister-designate on 17 March 2020 by Iraqi President Barham Salih after Mohammad Allawi withdrew his nomination. Al-Zurfi withdrew from forming a new government on 9 April 2020. He was appointed by Paul Bremer, the Coalition Provisional Authority administrator, as governor of Najaf Governorate in July 2004.

As a result of his willingness to work with the Iraqi government and the coalition he and his family were targeted by insurgents and militias. His uncle was killed in April 2004, and his brother was kidnapped in Kufra on 1 December 2005, just prior to the 2009 governorate elections, in which Zurfi was running.

A member of the Bani Hassan tribe, al-Zurfi earned a degree in Islamic law at Alfik College, the Islamic jurisprudence college, in Najaf.
