= Abd al-Rahim al-Hasini =

Iraqi politician

Abd al-Rahim Ahmad Ali al-Hasini is an Iraqi politician and secretary-general of the Shia Islamist Islamic Virtue Party, which is based in Basra.

He succeeded Nadim al-Jabiri in May 2006, and told Al-Hayat newspaper that the party planned to protect the youth by erecting barricades against "civilisational assaults". He said civil war was unlikely in Iraq, and differences could be overcome.
