= National Reform Trend =

National Reform Trend (Islah) تيار الإصلاح الوطني
- Leader: Ibrahim al-Jaafari
- Founder: Ibrahim al-Jaafari
- Founded: May 2008
- Headquarters: Baghdad, Iraq
- Ideology: Islamism
- Religion: Shia Islam
- Seats in the Council of Representatives of Iraq: 0 / 329
- Seats in the local governorate councils: 0 / 440

The National Reform Trend, also known as the National Reform Movement or as Islah (Arabic: تيار الإصلاح الوطني), is an Iraqi political party that was founded in 2008 by former Iraqi prime minister, Ibrahim al-Jaafari. It is a Shiite-Islamic-based party.

Jaafari was the secretary-general of the Islamic Dawa Party when he was elected Prime Minister. Following the December 2005 Iraqi legislative election, his reelection as Prime Minister was blocked by Kurdish and Sunni Arab coalition partners. Nouri al-Maliki, also from the Islamic Dawa Party, was elected as a compromise candidate in his place, and Maliki replaced Jaafari as party secretary general in May 2007.

== Iraqi governorate elections, 2009 ==
The party won several seats in the 2009 Iraqi governorate elections becoming the fourth largest Shi'a faction.

Governorate	seats won	out of
Baghdad Governorate	2	55
Babil Governorate	2	30
Basra Governorate	1	34
Diyala Governorate	1	29
Dhi Qar Governorate	4	31
Karbala Governorate	1	27
al-Qadisiyyah Governorate	3	28
Maysan Governorate	4	27
Muthanna Governorate	3	26
Najaf Governorate	3	28
Wasit Governorate	1	28

== Parliamentary elections 2010 ==
For the 2010 Iraqi parliamentary elections they joined up with other Shi'a religious parties to form the National Iraqi Alliance, Jaafari was placed prominently as number one on their list for Baghdad and was made chairman of the alliance. They however only managed to win one seat and that was the seat of Jaafari himself, who got over 100,000 votes.

== Parliamentary elections 2014 ==
National Reform Trend took part in the 2014 Iraqi parliamentary election as a coalition under the banner of Tayyar al islah and headed by Ibrahim al-Jaafari winning 6 seats in the Iraqi Parliament out of a total of 327 seats.

== See also ==
- List of Islamic political parties
