= Islamic Virtue Party =

Fadhila حزب الفضيلة الإسلامي
- Leader: Ammar Tu'ma Abd-Abbas
- Ideology: Shia Islamism; Anti-Zionism
- Seats in the Council of Representatives of Iraq: 0 / 329
- Seats in the local governorate councils: 15 / 440

Website
- http://www.alfadhela.net.iq/

The Islamic Virtue Party (Arabic حزب الفضيلة الإسلامي العراقي, romanized: Ḥizb al-Faḍīla al-Islāmiyya al-ʿIrāqi) is an Iraqi Shia political party.

After the 2003 invasion of Iraq, the party was formed.

In the January 2005 parliamentary elections, the party won 28 seats in the Transitional National Assembly as part of the United Iraqi Alliance. It also gained representation in the provincial councils of Baghdad, Karbala, Najaf, Al-Qadisiyah, Maysan, Dhi Qar, Al-Muthanna, and Basra.

== Platform ==
The party's main objectives are to guarantee freedom and prosperity for the Iraqi society in accordance with Sharia standards. It also aims to spread intellectual and political awareness among Iraqis to deepen the awareness of their religion and homeland. Ultimately, the party seeks to lead Iraqis toward an integration of consciousness and belief on their way to a better moral and material future, in a society enjoying freedom, justice, and independence.

System of governance

The party advocates for a constitutional, parliamentary, and pluralistic system that is founded on elections, and limited by Sharia. Federalism is not preferred but might be the best solution at this time.

Liberties & civil rights

The party believes "the constitution must guarantee human rights and the basic freedoms, which do not contradict the Islamic Sharia and common customs." Human rights should be guaranteed "in a manner that does not distort the nature of Iraqi society and the commandments of Islam, the true religion."

Minority rights

The party does not like to use the term "minority," as it considers all Iraqis to have equal rights and obligations. The party "believes in the cultural and national rights of the Kurds in a way that harmonizes with their circumstances and fits into the framework of a unified Iraq, in which Arabs and Kurds live in brotherhood and share equal rights of citizenship and equal and equivalent obligations."

Law and judiciary

The party's stance is that Sharia should be the source of laws, or at least that laws should not contradict it.

Distribution of wealth

The party's platform states that "the entirety of natural resources belongs to the public sector. [...] All movable assets attained from natural resources can be acquired only through labor. They can also be acquired through inheritance, indemnity for damages, and other forms of acquisition."

Iraq's identity

The party asserts that "the land and people of Iraq must remain unified. [...] Iraq belongs to all Iraqis. [...] The constitution must emphasize the Islamic identity of the country."

De-Ba'athification

The party believes that Ba'athists who committed crimes against the Iraqi people must be prosecuted by the law and justly penalized, while Ba'athists who did not commit any crimes against the Iraqi people should be slowly re-integrated into Iraq's political life.

Occupation of Iraq

The party views the presence of foreign forces in Iraq as "a comprehensive project of Western civilizing procedures aimed at changing ways of thinking and the present culture, in Iraq in particular and in the whole Middle East in general." It calls for this to be unmasked and resisted, but in a planned and scientific manner, acknowledging the importance of both violent and non-violent resistance.

Terrorism

The party asserts that terrorism in Iraq "was not a product of current confessional or intellectual preconditions in Iraq. It is rather a phenomenon that grew up outside Iraq and crept into Iraq within the range of regional and international interests. [...] The Sharia forbids terrorism."

Regional and international relations

According to the party, foreign policy should be based on Iraq's Arab and Islamic identity. It advocates for friendly relations with neighboring countries and all other countries except Israel.

== See also ==
- List of Islamic political parties
