= Al-Mehraab Martyr List =

List of the Martyr al-Mehraab and the Independent Forces, (Arabic: قائمة شهيد المحراب والقوى المستقلة), commonly known as the al-Mehraab Martyr List was a Shi'a Islamist, Iraqi political coalition formed for the 2009 Iraqi governorate elections by the Islamic Supreme Council of Iraq.

It was the largest party in the Council of Representatives of Iraq and won the most seats and votes in the Iraqi elections of 2006. The list won control of 8 out of Iraq's 18 governorates, including 6 of the country's 9 Shi'a governorates. The Vice President, Adel Abd al-Mahdi, and many Ministerial positions in the Iraqi Government were from this party. The party chairman, Abdul-Aziz al-Hakim, was the leader of Iraq's ruling United Iraqi Alliance.

The name is a reference to Ayatollah Seyyed Muhammad Baqir al-Hakim (Shahid al-Mehraab), the founder of the Supreme Council for the Islamic Revolution in Iraq (ISCI), who led the party until his assassination in the 2003 Imam Ali Mosque bombing. During the 2009 elections, Muhammad Baqir al-Hakim's brother Abdul-Aziz al-Hakim led the Supreme Council.

== Alliance ==
The list included the following parties:

- Islamic Supreme Council of Iraq (ISCI) - led by Abdul-Aziz al-Hakim
- Badr Organisation - led by Hadi al-Amiri
- Hezbollah Movement in Iraq - led by Hassan al-Sari
- Sayyid al-Shuhada Movement - led by Daghir al-Musawi
- The Independent Society for the Sake of Iraq -
- Several independent candidates, mainly from Shi'a parties

== Performance ==
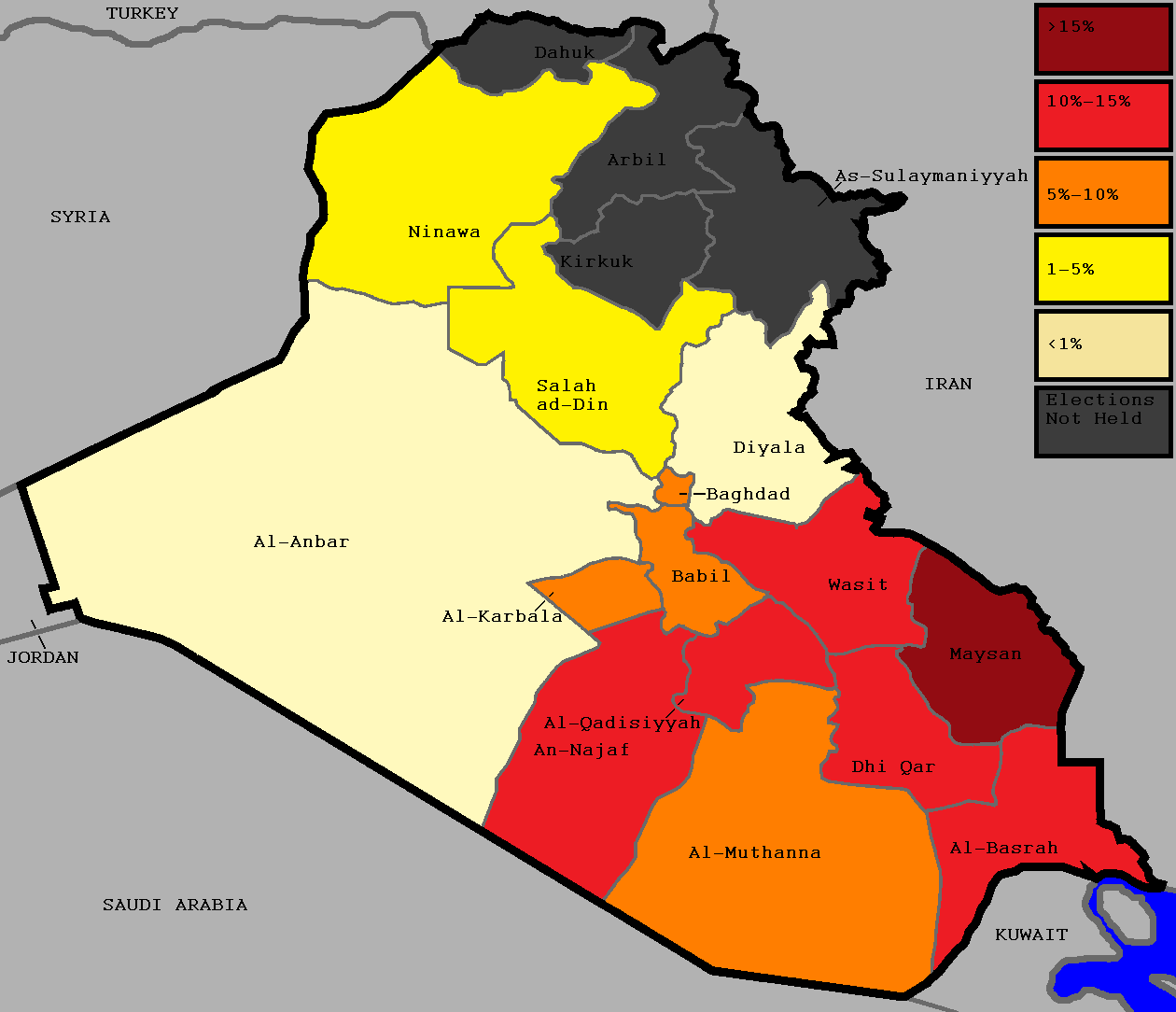
Percentage of votes for the al-Mehraab Martyr List in each governorate in 2009

Lists belonging to the Supreme Council dominated the Iraqi governorate elections in 2005, however during the 2009 governorate elections the al-Mehraab Martyr List, performed below what they had expected, winning only 6.6% of vote and 52 out of 440 seats. They did however still manage to come a distant second after Nouri al-Maliki's State of Law Coalition.

| Governorate | Percentage | Seats Won | Total Seats |
|---|---|---|---|
| al-Anbar | - | 0 | 29 |
| Babil | 8.2% | 5 | 30 |
| Baghdad | 5.4% | 3 | 57 |
| Basra | 11.6% | 5 | 35 |
| Dhi Qar | 11.1% | 5 | 31 |
| Diyala | - | 0 | 29 |
| Karbala | 6.4% | 4 | 27 |
| Maysan | 15.2% | 7 | 27 |
| al-Muthanna | 9.3% | 5 | 26 |
| Najaf | 14.8% | 7 | 28 |
| Ninawa | 1.9% | 0 | 37 |
| al-Qadisiyyah | 11.7% | 4 | 28 |
| Salah ad-Din | 2.9% | 1 | 28 |
| Wasit | 10.0% | 6 | 28 |
| Total: | 6.6% | 52 | 440 |
