= 2013 Al Anbar governorate election =

← 2009	20 June 2013	2017 →

All 30 seats for the al-Anbar Governorate council
- Turnout: 49.5% (▲9.5%)
Governor of Al Anbar before election
Qasim Al-Fahdawi
Independent
Subsequent Governor
Ahmed Khalaf Dheyabi
IIP

The Al Anbar governorate election of 2013 was held on 20 June 2013 alongside elections for Nineveh.

== Background ==
Whilst elections for 13 of Iraq's 18 governorates were held on 20 April, elections in the governorates of Al Anbar and Nineveh were delayed due to security concerns arising from the ongoing insurgency and Sunni-led protests.

== Campaign ==
=== Entities ===
A total of 17 political parties and coalitions contested the election, fielding a total of 548 candidates. The top four most popular groups were;

==== Mutahidun (The United) ====
Mutahidun is a major political force in Ninewa and Anbar, including in its ranks former finance minister Rafia al-Issawi's Future Gathering and tribal leader Ahmed Abu Risha's Awakening (Sahwa) Conference in addition to the Iraqi Islamic Party (IIP). The main leaders of the Mutahidun List were the two Nujaifi brothers; Usama and Atheel. The Nujaifis are not from Al Anbar, however, and so had formed these political alliances to garner more votes. In Anbar, tribal dynamics and locale trump politics and ideology, which, by contrast, are more prominent in Nineveh. The groups composing the Uniters List in Anbar had collectively won 14 seats in the 2009 elections.

==== Aabiroun Coalition ====
Aabiroun looked likely to win seats in the run up to the election. Led by then incumbent governor Mohammed Qassim al-Fahdawi, the coalition was composed of nine groups and mostly relied on popular appeal deriving from Fahdawi's tenure as governor.

==== Arabian Al Iraqia ====
Deputy Prime Minister Saleh al-Mutlaq competed under the Arab Iraqiyya coalition, consisting of six groups. The al-Hal movement ran as part of the coalition in both Anbar and Ninawa. The two groups had won a total of 9 seats at the previous election, however in the run up to the election Mutlaq had suffered from a declining popularity in Anbar.

==== Al Iraqia National and United Coalition ====
The Al Iraqia National and United Coalition is led by former Prime Minister Ayad Allawi and consists of 19 groups. The coalition won two seats in the 2009 elections. The elections will indicate Allawi’s political longevity among Iraqi Sunnis.

== Results ==
An IHEC spokesman announced the results on 27 June 2013, with the United List led by Iraqi parliamentary speaker Usama al-Nujayfi coming first, with 8 of the 30 seats. The Aabiroun Coalition; a bloc backed by Prime Minister Nour al-Maliki, came second with 5 seats.

Muhammad Mahdi al-Salih, the former Minister of Trade under Saddam Hussein, was rumoured to be a candidate supported by the Uniters List for the position of Governor of Anbar. The Uniters List later denied the rumours.

Ahmed Khalaf Dheyabi, a protest organizer from the Iraqi Islamic Party and a member of the Uniters List, was eventually chosen as the new Governor.

Summary of the 20 June 2013 Al Anbar governorate election results
Party/Coalition	Allied national parties	Leader	Seats	Change	Votes	%	±%
Muttahidoon	al-Hadba; National Future Gathering; Anbar Salvation Council; Iraqi Islamic Party	Usama al-Nujayfi; Rafi al-Issawi; Ahmed Abu Risha	8	▼6	115,605	27.89%	▼6.17%
Aabiroun Coalition		Qasim Al-Fahdawi	5		62,581	15.10%	
Arabian Al Iraqia	Iraqi National Dialogue Front al-Hal	Saleh al-Mutlaq	4	▼5	57,332	13.83%	▼10.56%
Al Iraqia National and United Coalition	Iraqi National Accord	Ayad Allawi	3	▲1	39,500	9.53%	▲2.73%
Al Anbar United Coalition		Kamil al-Dulaymi	3		35,214	8.49%	
National Cooperation Coalition		Ali Farhan	2		32,718	7.89%	
People’s Will Project		Sheikh Mohamad Daham Al Farhan	2		25,210	6.08%	
Iraq's Affluents		Sheikh Jamal Al Jadaan	1		10,785	2.60%	
Amiroun Coalition		Ahmad Raja	1		9,220	2.22%	
Valiants of Iraq Bloc		Sheikh Majed Ali Al Sulayman	1		8,932	2.15%	
Iraq’s Benevolence and Generosity List		Dr Rushdi Said					
Islamic Dawa Party - Iraq Organization		Hashim Al-Mosawy					
Arabs' Frontier		Sheikh Karab Bin Ali Al Samrad					
Iraq's Glory Coalition		Iyad Munjed Al Sulayman					
Al Anbar Citizens' Unified Coalition		Abdul Salam Raja Nawaf					
Najem Abdullah Ahmad Saleh	Independent						
Total			30	▲1	414,554	100%	
Sources: al-Sumaria - al-Anbar Coalitions, ISW, Anbar Final Results - IHEC Archived 4 March 2016 at the Wayback Machine, Anbar Final Candidate Vote Results - IHEC Archived 18 July 2013 at the Wayback Machine
