= Qasim Al-Fahadawi =

Iraqi politician and businessman

- قاسم الفهداوي
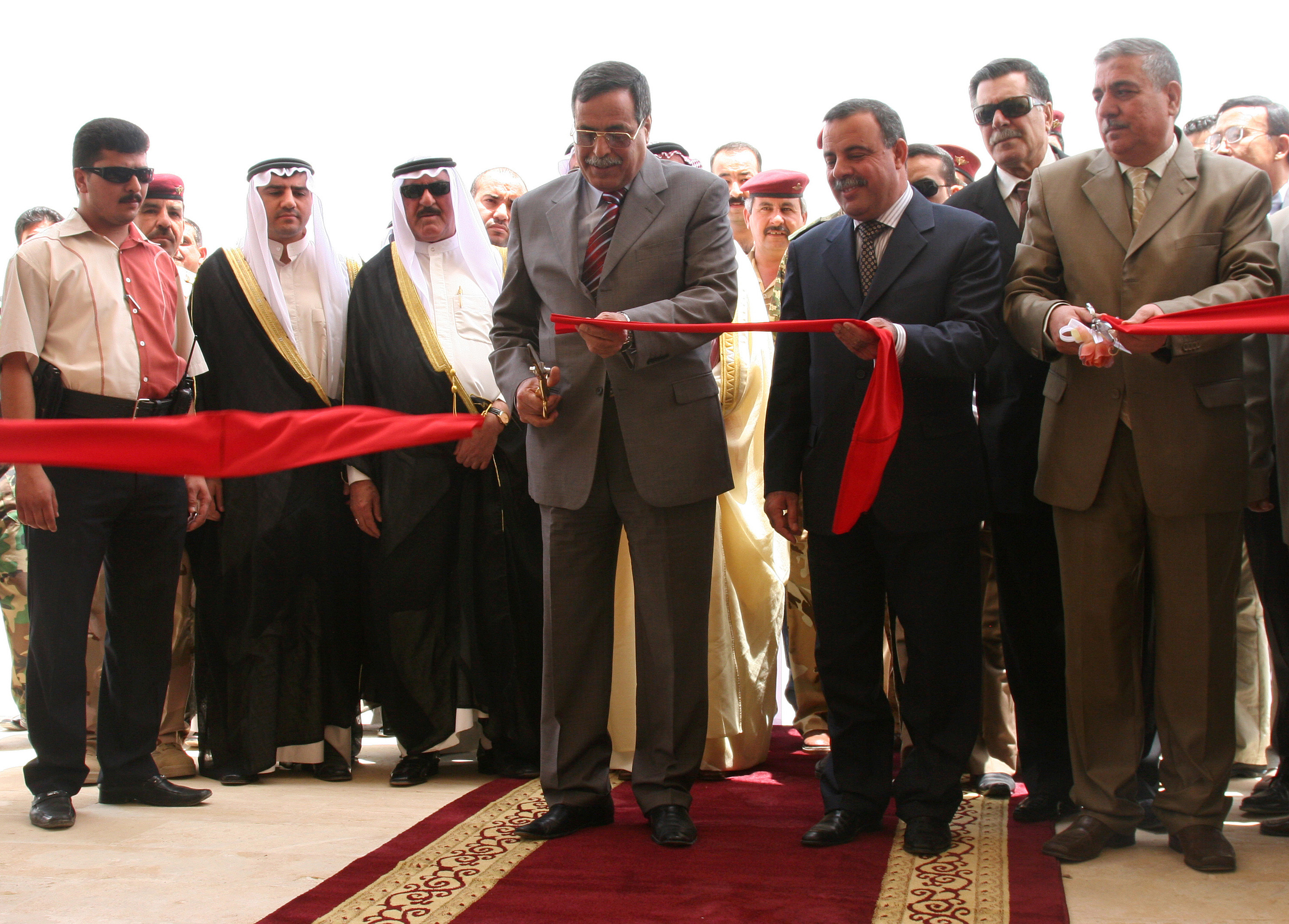

Minister of Electricity
- In office 8 September 2014 – 29 July 2018
- Prime Minister: Haider al-Abadi
- Preceded by: Kareem Aftan

Governor of Anbar
- In office April 2009 – 20 August 2013
- Deputy: Fuad Jatab Hamad Khalaf al-Karbuli; Hikmat Jassim Zaidon Khalaf al-Mohemdi
- Preceded by: Maamoon Sami Rasheed al-Alwani
- Succeeded by: Ahmed Khalaf Dheyabi

Personal details
- Born: Ramadi, Anbar, Iraq
- Education: University of Baghdad
- Occupation: Politician

Qasim Mohammad Abid Hammadi al-Fahadawi (Arabic: قاسم محمد عبد حمادي الفهداوي) is an Iraqi politician and businessman who is the former Minister of Electricity in the Al Abadi Government, and who previously served as the Governor of Anbar from April 2009 to August 2013.

== Early life ==
Al-Fahadawi was born in Ramadi, in western Iraq's Al Anbar province. He graduated from the University of Baghdad in 1977 with a degree in engineering, and later studied in Germany. He left Iraq in 2006 due to the ongoing violence in the country and moved to the United Arab Emirates where he ran a construction company.

== Term as Governor ==
Following the 2009 Al Anbar governorate election, the leaders of the largest two parties, Ahmed Abu Risha of the Iraq Awakening and Independents National Alliance and Saleh al-Mutlaq of the Iraqi National Dialogue Front, invited Al-Fahadawi to come to Anbar as governor. He said he would only do so if he could work with all parties and that there would be no partisan political interference in his work, which they agreed. He was voted in as Governor by the Anbar Provincial Council 24-3 and formed an administration with all parties in the provincial council except the Iraqi Islamic Party which declined to join.

Following his appointment, he condemned the "widely spread culture of corruption" that had developed and said he needed to "rebuild people's damaged morals". He pledged to focus on improving the supply of electricity and building new generation plants in Haditha, Ramadi and Fallujah. He signed a contract with a Korean company to build a complex of residences, hospitals, a sports centre and government buildings in Ramadi. In August 2009, fDi Magazine named him "Middle East Personality of the Year" for his work as governor.

Al-Fahadawi was seriously injured in an assassination attempt by a suicide bomber on December 30, 2009. He had been surveying the scene of an earlier suicide attack in Ramadi when the bomber struck. At least 23 others were killed. Fahadawi lost his hand in the attack and was fitted with a prosthetic replacement.

As Governor, he negotiated with the Emirati oil companies, Crescent Petroleum and Dana Gas to develop Anbar's Akkas gas field. The companies promised to create 100,000 jobs, and Fahadawi asked Prime Minister al-Maliki to by-pass the usual Oil Ministry tendering process to award the contract to these two companies. Opponents accused him of corruption, controlling how business contracts are awarded, with the head of the US Provincial Reconstruction Team saying that "accountability and transparency were at variance" with the expectations of Anbar's leaders.

Following the 2013 Anbar governorate election, Ahmed Khalaf Dheyabi, a protest organizer from the Iraqi Islamic Party and a member of the Uniters List, was eventually chosen as the new Governor. He was sworn in on 20 August 2013.

== Term as Minister ==
Al-Fahadawi was appointed by Haider al-Abadi to serve in his government, a role he assumed on 8 September 2014, serving as Minister of Electricity. In February 2016, Al-Fahadaqi was named as someone who could potentially lose their role in a future reshuffle.
