= Abu Risha =

Abu Risha may refer to:

- Abdul Sattar Abu Risha (1972–2007), an Iraqi Sunni tribal sheikh and leader of the Anbar Salvation Council
- Ahmed Abu Risha, brother of Abdul Sattar Abu Risha who took over as leader of the Anbar Salvation Council
