= 2010 Iraqi parliamentary election =

- 7 March 2010
- All 325 seats in the Council of Representatives; 163 seats needed for a majority
Party	Leader	Vote %	Seats	+/–
INM	Ayad Allawi	24.72	91	+54
State of Law	Nouri al-Maliki	24.22	89	+64
NIA	Ibrahim al-Jaafari	18.15	70	−35
Kurdistan List	Barham Salih	14.59	43	−10
Gorran	Nawshirwan Mustafa	4.13	8	+8
Tawafuq	Adnan al-Dulaimi	2.59	6	−38
Unity Alliance	Ahmed Abu Risha	2.66	4	+4
KIU	Salahaddin Bahaaddin	2.11	4	−1
KIG	Ali Bapir	1.32	2	+1
Ethnic minorities	–	0.53	8	+6
This lists parties that won seats. See the complete results below.
Results by governate
Prime Minister before	Prime Minister after
Nouri al-Maliki; State of Law	Nouri al-Maliki; State of Law

Parliamentary elections were held in Iraq on 7 March 2010. The elections decided the 325 members of the Council of Representatives who would elect the prime minister and president. The elections resulted in a partial victory for the Iraqi National Movement, led by former Interim Prime Minister Ayad Allawi, which won 91 seats, making it the largest alliance in the Council. The State of Law Coalition, led by incumbent Prime Minister Nouri Al-Maliki, was the second largest grouping with 89 seats.

Prior to the election, the Supreme Court in Iraq ruled that the existing electoral law/rule was unconstitutional, and a new elections law made changes in the electoral system. On 15 January 2010, the Independent High Electoral Commission (IHEC) banned 499 candidates from the election due to alleged links with the Ba'ath Party. Before the start of the campaign on 12 February 2010, IHEC confirmed that the appeals by banned candidates had been rejected and thus all 456 banned candidates would not be allowed to run for the election.

The turnout was low (62.4%) compared to the elections of 2005 (79.6%). There were numerous allegations of fraud, and a recount of the votes in Baghdad was ordered on 19 April 2010. On 14 May IHEC announced that after 11,298 ballot boxes had been recounted, there was no sign of fraud or violations.

The new parliament opened on 14 June 2010. After months of fraught negotiations, an agreement was reached on the formation of a new government on 11 November. Talabani would continue as president, Al-Maliki would stay on as prime minister and Allawi would head a new security council.

== Electoral system ==
The necessary election law was only passed on 8 November 2009, and the UN Mission in Iraq, which is helping with the elections, estimated that it needed 90 days to plan for the election. The electoral commission asked for a delay from the original date of 15 January. Iraqi Vice President Tariq Al-Hashimi vetoed the election law on 18 November 2009, delaying the election, which was originally scheduled for 21 January.

Prior to the election, the Supreme Court in Iraq ruled that the existing electoral rule was unconstitutional. The parliament therefore set about drafting a new electoral law.

The Iraqi cabinet approved a draft elections law in September 2009. However, it took two months and ten delays for the law to pass in the Council of Representatives. The main areas of dispute concerned the "open list" electoral system and the voters roll in Kirkuk Governorate, which Arab and Turkmen parties alleged had been manipulated by the Kurdistan Regional Government of Iraq. It also separated each governorate into its own electoral district, instead of the country as a whole being used as one single district.

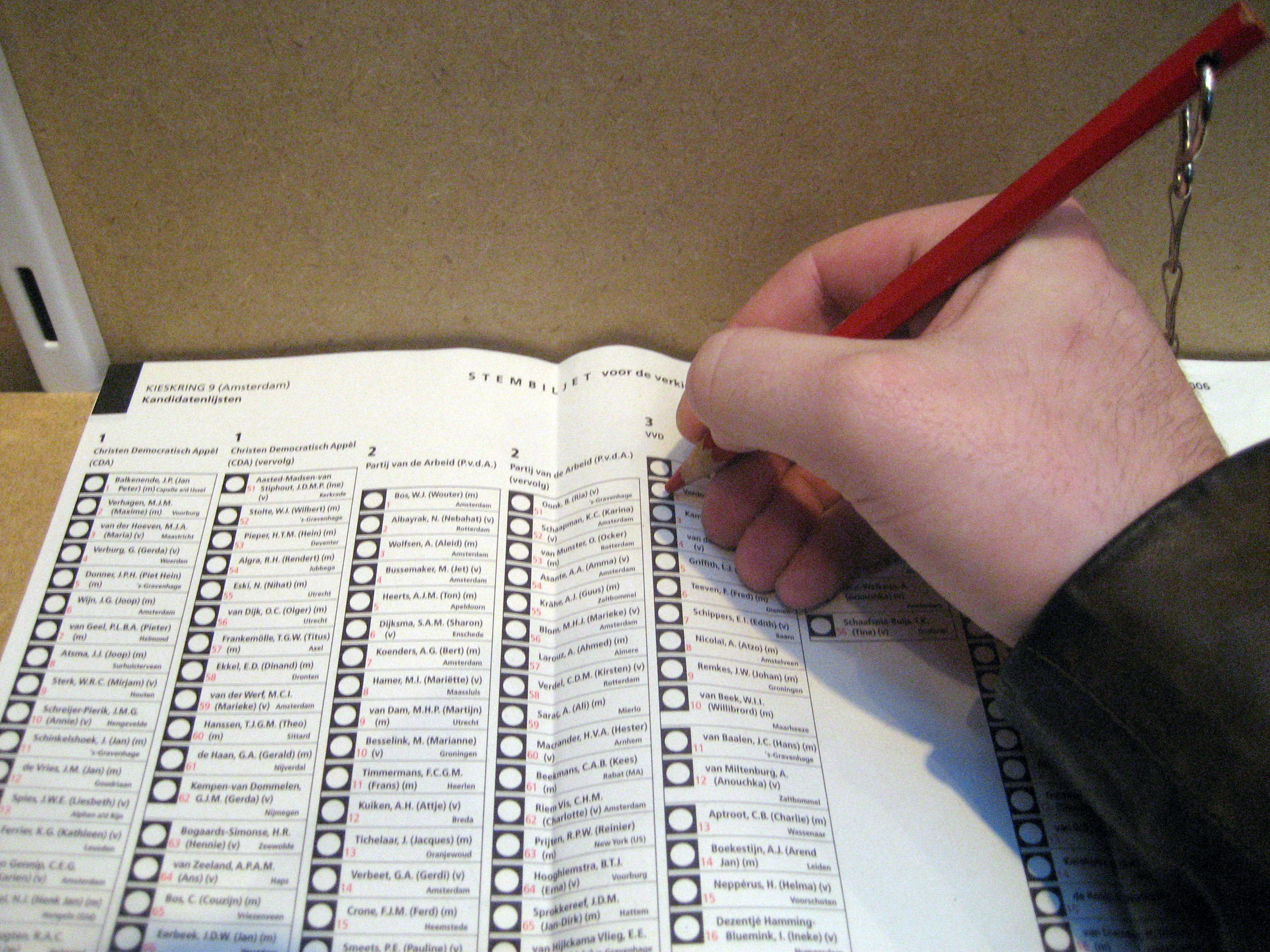
Example open list ballot paper from the Netherlands with parties across the top and individuals listed down the page

=== Open lists ===
UNAMI advised the electoral system was changed to allow people to vote for individuals as well as party lists under the open list form of proportional representation. The last national elections had used a closed list system, but the Iraqi governorate elections of 2009 had used open lists. The move was initially supported by parliamentarians from ISCI, and the most senior Iraqi Shiite cleric, Ayatollah Ali al-Sistani, warned that failure to adopt the open list system would have "negative impacts on the democratic process" and would reduce turnout and aides said he may call for a boycott of the polls if closed lists were used again. In the end, all parties except for the Kurdistani Alliance agreed to support open lists which was adopted.

=== Kirkuk governorate ===
In Kirkuk Governorate, it was proposed to use old 2004 electoral rolls. However, Kurds protested about this, given the large number of Kurdish people who had settled there since then. UNAMI then proposed that Kirkuk be divided into two or more ethnic constituencies, with the Kurdish constituency given an automatic quota of 50% plus one. When put to parliament, this proposal was blocked by Arab MPs, causing a deadlock. The issue was referred to the Political Council for National Security, which comprises the President, Prime Minister and party leaders. The Council proposed to combine the electoral rolls from 2004 and 2009, but when this was put to parliament, it was blocked by Kurds. UNAMI then proposed using the 2009 records but revisiting for future elections. When put to a vote the Kurdish MPs walked out, leaving the parliament without a quorum. The final law said that the results in Kirkuk - and other governorates where the rolls were deemed "dubious" - would be provisional, subject to review within the first year by a committee formed out of the electoral commission, parliament, government and UNAMI, which could cancel fraudulent ballots. The law was passed by a vote of 141 to 54, with 80 members absent.

=== Seat allocation ===
The law increased the size of the council from 275 to 325 members – equal to one seat per 100,000 citizens, as specified in the Constitution of Iraq. As with the December 2005 election, seats will be allocated by governorate with additional "compensatory" seats allocated to those parties whose national share of the vote isn't reflected in the seats won at the governorate level. The votes of Iraqis living abroad would originally have been counted in the compensatory seats, which were reduced from 45 seats to 16 and eight of these 16 seats were allocated to specific national minorities – five for Iraqi Christians and one each for Yazidis, Shabak and Mandaeans.

Iraqi Vice-President Tariq al-Hashimi said the small number of compensatory seats discriminated against the estimated 2 million Iraqi refugees, many of whom are Sunni Arabs like al-Hashimi. He demanded that the number of compensatory seats be increased to 15% (48) and went on national television to say he would veto the law if it weren't amended. Sunni Arab parliamentarian Saleh al-Mutlaq said 30 seats should be allocated to Iraqis abroad to reflect their numbers. President Jalal Talabani also supported the increase to 15%, after receiving a letter from Kurdish regional MPs saying their allies from minority groups would be unfairly treated. In the event President Talabani and Vice-President Adel Abdul Mahdi signed the law despite their concerns, but Hashimi followed through his threat and vetoed it.

Parliament asked the Supreme Federal Court for advice, and it issued a statement saying that "all Iraqis, whether they live in the country or outside its borders, should be represented in the parliament." There was some confusion over this statement with the head of the legal affairs committee interpreted this as annulling the veto. However, Ayad al-Samarrai, the parliamentary speaker said the statement was not binding on parliament because it was advice rather a ruling in response to a complaint. Parliament therefore met to consider the law again. Hundreds of supporters of the Prime Minister held demonstrations against the veto in Najaf, Basra and Wasit.

The President of Iraqi Kurdistan, Massoud Barzani, then threatened to boycott the election if the representation of the three provinces in Kurdistan wasn't increased. The provinces had only gained three of the 77 additional seats.

When the Iraqi Parliament met again they amended the law to provide that Iraqis abroad would vote in the governorate they lived before they left the country. The number of seats per governorate was then changed to increase all governorates by a fixed 2.8% over the 2005 population figures – meaning Kurdish areas got more seats but Sunni Arab areas got fewer. Analysts said Hashemi had "played poker and lost" and an MP from a rival Sunni Arab party said he should go and apologize to the governorates that had lost out. Tribal leaders in the Sunni Arab city of Tikrit threatened to call for a poll boycott if the amended law went through and Hashemi said he would veto again.

Internally displaced people will only be allowed to vote where their ration card was issued, a provision that Taha Daraa, MP in Diyala, said discriminated against them and was unconstitutional. He called on the constitutional court to strike down the provision.

Head of IHEC, Faraj Al Haydari, announced that curfew will be imposed and airports closed on the day of elections. The head of the IHEC electoral directorate, Haydar Al Abboudi, said he hoped to announce the results of elections three days later.

The council agreed to increase the number of seats from 275 to 325. With this, the number of seats allocated to each governorate were changed from 2005 elections.

Governorate	Seats 2010	Seats 2005	In/de-creased by	Percentage in/de-crease	Registered voters	Votes Cast
Al Anbar Governorate	14	9	5	55.6%	802,000	472,603
Babil Governorate	16	11	5	45.5%	961,000	586,281
Baghdad Governorate	68	59	9	15.3%	4,599,000	2,541,766
Basra Governorate	24	16	8	50.0%	1,466,000	814,810
Dahuk Governorate	10	7	3	42.9%	574,000	424,715
Dhi Qar Governorate	18	12	6	50.0%	993,000	572,177
Diyala Governorate	13	10	3	30.0%	840,000	502,896
Erbil Governorate	14	13	1	7.7%	917,000	680,408
Karbala Governorate	10	6	4	66.7%	564,000	333,434
Kirkuk Governorate	12	9	3	33.3%	787,000	556,384
Maysan Governorate	10	7	3	42.9%	561,000	272,818
Muthanna Governorate	7	5	2	40.0%	379,000	229,141
Najaf Governorate	12	8	4	50.0%	696,000	411,424
Nineveh Governorate	31	19	12	63.2%	1,702,000	1,054,798
Al-Qādisiyyah Governorate	11	8	3	37.5%	619,000	373,339
Saladin Governorate	12	8	4	50.0%	696,000	488,865
Sulaymaniyah Governorate	17	15	2	13.3%	1,098,000	833,631
Wasit Governorate	11	8	3	37.5%	638,000	376,922
Compensatory seats	7	45	-38	-84.4%		
Minorities	8	0	8	100%		
Total	325	275	50	18.2%	18,892,000	11,526,412

== Coalitions ==
The United Iraqi Alliance, made up primarily of religious Shi'ite parties, won 128 out of 275 seats in the previous election and was the largest party in the parliament. The list split into two lists for this election: the State of Law Coalition of Prime Minister Nouri al-Maliki and the National Iraqi Alliance, which included most of the other parties. In total 160 regular parties as well as 36 independents and 10 minority parties and candidates took part in the election, see here for a full list of the participants.

=== National Iraqi Alliance (NIA) – List 316 ===
The National Iraqi Alliance (NIA or INA) is a coalition of mainly Shi'a parties. It was first mooted in August 2009 and is made up of the principal remaining components of the United Iraqi Alliance: The Islamic Supreme Council of Iraq (ISCI) and affiliated Badr Organization, the Sadr Movement, Ex-Prime Minister Ibrahim al-Jaafari (who became the group's chairman) and his National Reform Trend (Islah), the Islamic Fadhila Party and an Islamic Dawa Party – Iraq Organisation (Tanzim al-Iraq) breakaway faction: the Islamic Dawa Party – Domestic Faction (Tanzim al-Dakhli) headed by Abdul Karim al-Anizi. ISCI was reported to have offered to split the coalition's seats four ways: 25% to ISCI and Badr, 25% to the Sadrists, 25% to Prime Minister Nouri al-Maliki's Islamic Dawa Party and 25% to minor parties and independents. However, Maliki demanded half the seats – reflecting the results of the Iraqi governorate elections of 2009, which were won by Maliki's State of Law Coalition – and a guarantee of another term as prime minister. He also wanted Sunni Arab parties like the Awakening movements to be included as primary members of the coalition to form what his spokesman termed "a truly national alliance". In September, the coalition was formally announced without the Islamic Dawa Party. Despite its religious Shi'a character, the alliance claims to represent all of Iraq and it also includes some secular parties such as former Oil Minister Ahmad Chalabi's Iraqi National Congress and Sunni parties such as Hamid Hayes' Tribes of Iraq Coalition, an al-Anbar Awakening Council splinter group.

=== State of Law Coalition (SLC) – List 337 ===
After negotiations between Prime Minister Nouri al-Maliki and Ammar al-Hakim's Islamic Supreme Council for the National Iraqi Alliance broke down, al-Maliki decided to run with the State of Law Coalition (SLC or SLA) which was built around his Islamic Dawa Party for the 2009 local elections. The State of Law Coalition's largest component are members of al-Maliki's Dawa party and members of the incumbent al-Maliki led government. Other major notable components are the Islamic Dawa Party – Tanzim al-Iraq and Oil Minister Hussain al-Shahristani's "Independent Bloc". While it is a mainly Shi'a alliance, State of Law is officially a national, non-sectarian, multi-ethnic coalition. It includes several minor Sunni, Christian, Kurdish and Turkmen parties and independent candidates such as Abbas al-Bayati's Islamic Union of Iraqi Turkoman and Sheikh Ali Hatem al-Suleiman's Anbar Salvation National Front, an Anbar Awakening Council splinter group. The State of Law Coalition was the winner of the 2009 Iraqi governorate elections, where they became the largest list, winning 126 out of 440 local seats and becoming the largest list in 8 of the 9 Shi'a provinces and Baghdad.

=== al-Iraqiyya (INM) – List 333 ===
The Iraqi National Movement (INM), more commonly known as al-Iraqiyya, is the main secular, non-sectarian and Nationalist list, it is headed by former prime minister Ayad Allawi. In the 2005 election Allawi's Iraqi National List won 8% of the vote, winning votes among secular Shi'a and Sunnis. In 2009 Vice-President Tariq al-Hashimi left the Sunni Iraqi Islamic Party (which was at the time, Iraq's main Sunni party), and launched a new party called the Renewal List. Hashimi's party joined the al-Iraqiyya. Also joining was the Iraqi National Dialogue Front (Hiwar) led by former Ba'ath Party member Saleh al-Mutlak. The list includes most of the country's main Sunni-based, Nationalist parties: al-Hadba, al-Hal, ex-President Ghazi al-Yawer's The Iraqis, Adnan Pachachi's Assembly of Independent Democrats and Deputy Prime Minister Rafi al-Issawi's party, as well as the country's largest Turkmen party, the Iraqi Turkmen Front.

In January 2010 the De-Baathification Commission barred al-Mutlak from the election due to his previous membership of the Iraqi Ba'ath Party. The al-Iraqiyya List threatened to boycott the election unless the decision was reversed.

=== al-Tawafuq – List 338 ===
The Iraqi Accord Front, more commonly known as al-Tawafuq is a Sunni Islamist list which was the main Sunni coalition in 2005, winning 15% and 44 seats as an alliance between the Iraqi Islamic Party, the General Council for the People of Iraq (Iraqi People's Gathering) and the Iraqi National Dialogue Council. Since then the Iraqi National Dialogue Council left the alliance and after disappointing results in 2009, the Iraqi Islamic Party's leader Tariq al-Hashemi resigned from his position and left the party to create his own party and join al-Iraqiyya. The alliance still includes several independent candidates and the Sunni Islamist, Turkmen Justice Party. In 2009 Tawafuq was still the largest Sunni list with 32 seats however they received less than 25% of the votes they received in 2005 and lost in their main stronghold, the al-Anbar governorate. Meanwhile, the parties which would later form al-Iraqiyya won over 70 seats.

=== Iraq's Unity – List 348 ===
Ahmed Abu Risha, the head of the Awakening movement party that won the most seats in the 2009 Al Anbar governorate election, formed a coalition with Interior Minister Jawad al-Bolani's Iraqi Constitutional Party and Ahmed Abdul Ghafour al-Samarrai, chief of Sunni Endowment Office, called the Unity Alliance of Iraq, also known as Iraq's Unity or Iraqi Unity. Abu Risha had previously held talks with Maliki on joining the State of Law Coalition.

=== Kurdistani List – List 372 and other Kurdish Lists ===
The Kurdistan List called for a single pan-Kurdish list, including the Islamist parties and the opposition Gorran Movement, which had gained a quarter of the seats in the Iraqi Kurdistan legislative election of 2009. However, the Gorran Movement said the two main Kurdistani Alliance parties – the Iraqi President Jalal Talabani's Patriotic Union of Kurdistan (PUK) and Kurdish President Massoud Barzani's Kurdistan Democratic Party of Iraq (KDP) – tended to "monopolize" power, and competing separately would "secure their own powers" in Baghdad. The Kurdistan Islamic Union (KIU) also said it would compete separately, as it had in December 2005, and rejected a pan-Islamist coalition with the Islamic Movement of Kurdistan (IMK) and the Kurdistan Islamic Group (IGK). Therefore, Gorran, the KIU and the IGK all three ran in separate lists, while the PUK and KDP ran in a joint "Kurdistani List" together with several minor parties including the Kurdistan Communist Party, Qadir Aziz's Kurdistan Toilers' Party and the IMK. Though a mainly Kurdish List, the Kurdistan List also includes the Turkmen Brotherhood In 2005 the Democratic Patriotic Alliance of Kurdistan had won 21.7% of the votes and 53 out of 275 seats with the Kurdistan Islamic Union winning 1.3% of the votes and 5 seats. In the 2009 Kurdistan general elections the Kurdistani List had won 59 out of 100 Kurdish seats, Gorran winning 25 and the Islamist list of the KIU and IGK winning 13 seats.

== Opinion polls ==
In February 2010 the National Media Center, a government agency conducted a survey among 5,000 Iraqis from 18 different provinces. When people were asked who they would vote for the poll gave the following results:

- State of Law Coalition: 29.9%
- Iraqi National Movement: 21.8%
- National Iraqi Alliance: 17.2%
- Kurdistani List 10%
- Iraqi Unity: 5%
- Iraqi Accord Front: 2.7%
- Other: 6.3%
- No Opinion 4.9%
- No Response 2.2%

When asking if people would vote or not two-thirds said they would vote. Among Shi'a Muslims 63% said they would vote, among Sunni Muslims this was 58%. 57% of the Arabs said they would vote while 67% of the Kurds said they would vote. Of those asked 47% supported the candidate ban, 38% opposed it and 15% had no opinion.

According to the Sadrists, they expected the National Iraqi Alliance to be the largest Shi'a List, winning 70 to 80 seats in the government, where from the Sadr Movement would win at least 35. Spokesmen from Da'awa were skeptical about these claims.

== Pre-election controversies ==
=== Candidate ban ===
On 15 January 2010 Iraq's electoral commission banned 499 candidates, mostly Sunni Muslims, from the election due to alleged links with the Ba'ath Party. Several prominent Sunni politicians were among the banned, including Iraqi Front for National Dialogue leader Saleh al-Mutlaq, Iraqi Defence Minister Qadir Obeidi and Iraqi Accordance Front chairman Dhafer al-Ani. Among the banned candidates 216 were former members of the Ba'ath Party (including 13 mid-ranking members), 182 were members of the paramilitary Fedayeen Saddam and the Mukhabarat (Saddam's intelligence service), a further 105 of them were officers from the Old Iraqi army, including several ex-generals.

Among the banned candidates 60% were Sunni Muslims and 40% were Shi'a however all of the banned candidates are members of secular and liberal parties and not a single member of a Sunni or Shi'a religious party was banned. According to Sheikh Abu Risha 7 of the banned candidates were members of his Anbar Salvation Council and 70 were members of the Iraq Unity list, a major Sunni list led by Abu Risha and Jawad al-Bolani.

The electoral commission was criticized for alleged partiality and ties to Shi'a religious parties and some feared this decision will lead to sectarian tensions. Sunni Muslims largely boycotted the January 2005 elections and it was feared they would boycott this election as well, since the dominant Sunni list-the Iraqi National Movement-threatened to boycott the elections if the decision was not reversed. Al-Mutlaq himself said he would resort to the United Nations and the international community if he is banned from the next election calling the decision a political decision "linked to foreign desire". Sheikh Ahmed Abu Risha, head of the Awakening councils threatened he might boycott the 2010 elections as well if the 70 banned candidates of his list were not unbanned. Earlier, Massoud Barzani had threatened Kurds might boycott the elections over the seat allocations. Kurds however decided not to boycott after more seats were allocated to them.

Iraqi President Jalal Talabani called on the Supreme Court to settle the dispute over the banned candidates saying: "We should not be unjust with them." American Vice President Joe Biden travelled to Iraq on 23 January to try resolve the matters of the election ban. In response on 25 January, Iraq dropped the ban on 59 out of 150 candidates who had appealed their ban. A total of 458 however remained banned from the elections. On 3 February the appeals court has temporarily lifted the ban on the candidates allowing them to run, which the Iraqi government condemned the decision by the court calling it "illegal and unconstitutional". The suspending of the ban is meant to allow the candidates to run, the Supreme Court said they will then review the candidates after the election. The government however ordered the Supreme Court to make their final ruling on the candidates before the election. However out of 511 candidates most had been replaced by their parties (and 59 had been unbanned), only 177 candidates appealed their ban. According to IHEC spokesman Khalid al-Shami only 37 of those appealed their ban correctly, the other 140 remain banned.

US Ambassador Christopher Hill said that by lifting the ban the elections would become credible. Iraqi Prime Minister Nouri al-Maliki however said they would not allow Hill to go beyond his diplomatic mission and that Iraq would not bow to any US-pressure. He also insisted that the ban on the alleged Ba'athist candidates must be implemented. Maliki called on the countries high court for a final decision and also called for a parliamentary meeting to discuss the issue.

Before the start of the campaign on 12 February 2010, the IHEC confirmed that the appeals by banned candidates had been rejected and thus all 456 banned candidates would not be allowed to run for the election. The Iraqi National Movement (al-Iraqiyya list) suspended their election campaign in response.

=== Boycott ===
Worker-communist Party of Kurdistan and Worker-communist Party of Iraq boycotted the elections, as in their view, conditions and principles for a fair election were not met.

=== Election violence ===
On 13 February, the day the election campaign started, there were several bombings. The first bomb struck a political office of Saleh al-Mutlaq, a second bomb was thrown into a building in West-Baghdad used by Sunni scholars and election candidates, while a third bomb damaged the National Iraqi Alliance's headquarters in Eastern Baghdad, a fourth blast struck the headquarters of the Moderate Movement list, injuring two people, a fifth blast struck a building used by Nehru Mohammed Abdul Karim al-Kasanzani's list, injuring one person. On 15 February, Abu Omar al-Baghdadi the leader of the Islamic State of Iraq, an umbrella organisation which includes al-Qaeda in Iraq released an internet message calling for a Sunni boycott against the election. He was quoted as saying: "Sunni participation in this election will certainly lead to the establishment of the principle that Sunnis in Iraq are a minority who have to be ruled by the rejectionists" (a term used by radical Sunnis to describe Shi'a Muslims), he also said that his group would use "primarily military means to prevent these elections". On 16 and 17 February campaign workers for the secular Ahrar party were attacked in Baghdad and Maysan governorates when trying to hang up posters. Also between 14 and 17 February at least four Christians were killed by Sunni insurgents. While on 18 February an al-Qaeda suicide bomber struck a government headquarters in Ramadi, al-Anbar, as part of their campaign to paralyze the elections. 26 February four civilians were injured as a massive blast struck Iraq's finance ministry. A car bomb targeted an election convoy for Sunni candidate Ashur Hamid al-Karboul, in Khaldiyah in al-Anbar. A campaign worker and a bystander were killed.

On 3 March, two car bombs exploded in the city of Baquba, Diyala, killing 33 people and injuring 55. This was one of the deadliest bombings of the year.

One of the hardest hit communities during the election period is the Assyrian community. Attacks against the Assyrians began in December in Mosul, Iraq's second largest city. It led to the assassination of over 20 Christians and the bombings of different churches in Mosul. The attacks led to 680 Christian families flying Mosul to Nineveh Plains.

On election day, Islamist insurgents distributed leaflets in Sunni neighbourhoods of Baghdad warning people not to go to the polls, they mostly used rockets, mortars and explosive-filled plastic bottles hidden under trash to target those who did vote, this was due to a vehicle ban the government had enforced to stop car-bombings. Attacks killed 42 people and wounded at least 110. In Baghdad Katyusha rockets killed at least 4 people and wounded 16 in the neighbourhoods of Qreiat and al-Hurriya, while roadside bombs killed 7 people in Baghdad. In Mahmoudiyah, a city near Baghdad, a policeman was killed and 11 people were injured when two mortars struck a polling center. One woman was killed and 36 people were injured during attacks on polling centers in the insurgent stronghold of Mosul. But the largest attack came in Baghdad when a Katyusha rocket hit a flat in Ur neighbourhood, killing 25 people and injuring 20. Non-fatal attacks on election day were reported in Tikrit, Baquba, Samarra and Fallujah.

According to the Iraq Body Count, from 12 February (when the campaigning started) until 7 March (election day), at least 228 people were killed. Another 176 people were killed in the period between election day and the release of the final results.

== Results ==
Party	Votes	%	Seats	+/–
Iraqi National Movement	2,849,612	24.72	91	+54
State of Law Coalition	2,792,083	24.22	89	+64
National Iraqi Alliance	2,092,066	18.15	70	–35
Kurdistan List	1,681,714	14.59	43	–10
Movement for Change	476,478	4.13	8	+8
Iraqi Accord Front	298,226	2.59	6	–38
Unity Alliance of Iraq	306,647	2.66	4	+4
Kurdistan Islamic Union	243,720	2.11	4	–1
Islamic Group of Kurdistan	152,530	1.32	2	+1
Reserved seats for ethnic minorities	61,153	0.53	8	+6
Others	572,183	4.96	–	–
Total	11,526,412	100.00	325	+50
Registered voters/turnout	18,902,073	–		
Source: Psephos

=== By governorate ===
Governorate	State of Law	NIA	al-Iraqiya	Kurdistan List	Gorran	Tawafuq	Unity	KIU	KIG	Total Seats
al-Anbar	0	0	11	-	-	2	1	-	-	14
Babil	8	5	3	0	-	0	0	-	-	16
Baghdad	26	17	24	0	0	1	0	0	-	68
Basra	14	7	3	-	-	-	0	-	-	24
Dahuk	-	0	-	9	0	-	-	1	0	10
Dhi Qar	8	9	1	0	-	-	0	-	-	18
Diyala	1	3	8	1	0	0	0	0	-	13
Erbil	-	0	-	10	2	-	-	1	1	14
Karbala	6	3	1	-	-	-	0	-	-	10
Kirkuk	0	0	6	6	0	0	-	0	0	12
Maysan	4	6	0	-	-	-	0	-	-	10
Muthanna	4	3	0	0	-	0	0	-	-	7
Najaf	7	5	0	0	-	-	0	-	-	12
Nineveh	0	1	20	8	0	1	1	0	0	31
Qadisiyyah	4	5	2	0	-	-	0	-	-	11
Saladin	0	0	8	0	0	2	2	-	-	12
Sulaimaniyah	-	0	-	8	6	-	-	2	1	17
Wasit	5	4	2	0	-	-	0	-	-	11
Compensatory	2	2	2	1	0	0	0	0	0	7
Minority	0	0	0	0	0	0	0	0	0	8
Total	89	70	91	43	8	6	4	4	2	325

=== Candidate votes ===
#	Candidate	Party	Election list	Governorate	Votes
1.	Nouri al-Maliki	Islamic Da'awa Party	State of Law Coalition	Baghdad	622,961
2.	Ayad Allawi	Iraqi National Accord	al-Iraqiyya	Baghdad	407,537
3.	Usama al-Nujayfi	al-Hadba	al-Iraqiyya	Nineveh	274,741
4.	Tariq al-Hashemi	Renewal List	al-Iraqiyya	Baghdad	200,963
5.	Ibrahim al-Jaafari	National Reform Trend	National Iraqi Alliance	Baghdad	101,053
6.	hakm shex Latif	Gorran Movement	Gorran List	Sulaymaniyah	93,196
7.	Rafi al-Issawi	National Future Gathering	al-Iraqiyya	Al Anbar	83,145
8.	Baqir Jabr al-Zubeidi	Islamic Supreme Council of Iraq	National Iraqi Alliance	Baghdad	68,822
9.	Khalid Shwani	Patriotic Union of Kurdistan	Kurdistani List	Kirkuk	68,522
10.	Arshad al-Salihi	Iraqi Turkmen Front	al-Iraqiyya	Kirkuk	59,732
11.	Ali Bapir	Islamic Group of Kurdistan	IGK List	Erbil	50,116

=== Fraud allegations ===
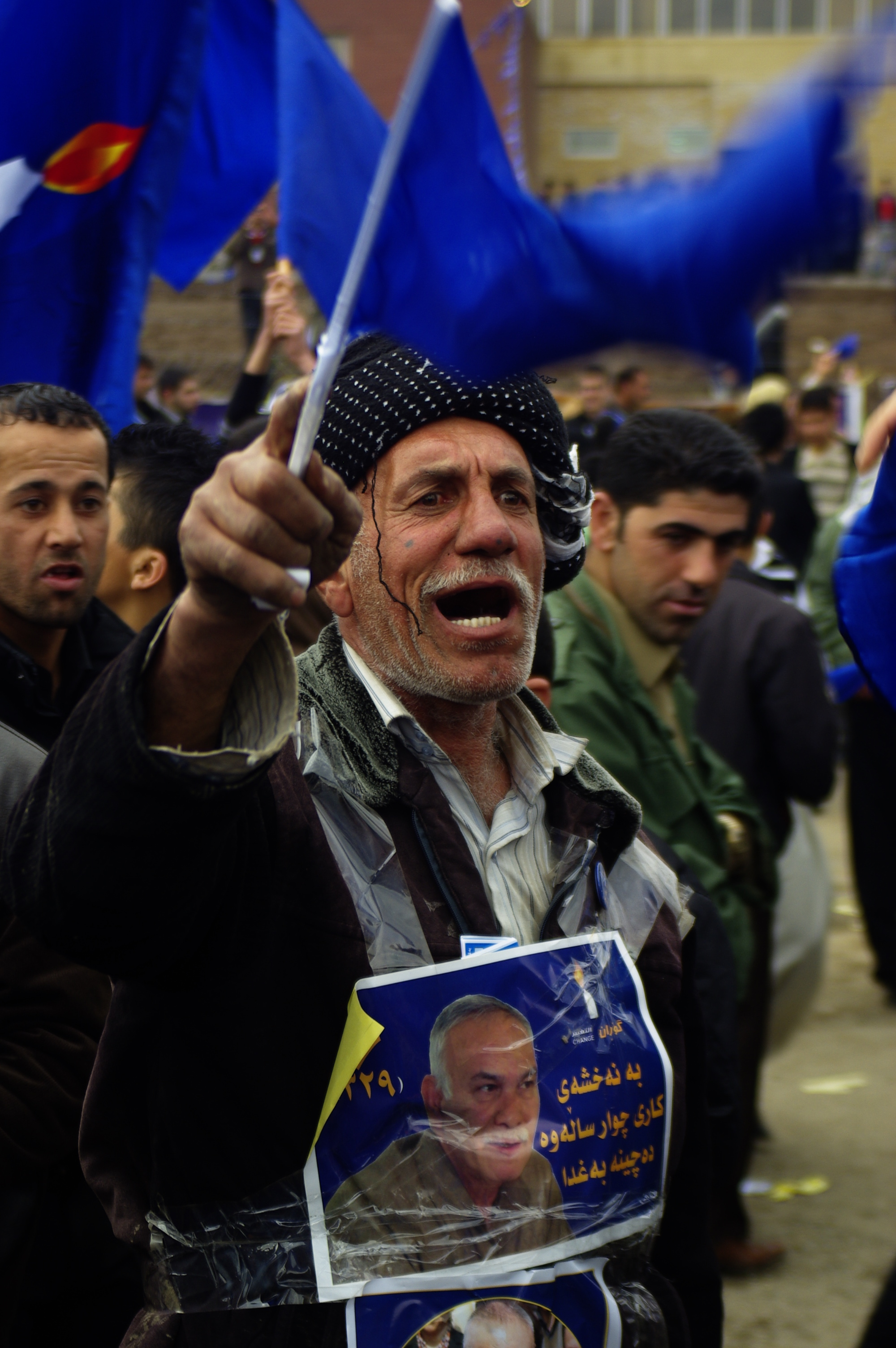
Gorran Movement supporters

Prior to the elections there were already claims that Prime Minister Nouri al-Maliki's list was planning to rig elections. The fact that the government printed 26 million ballots, 35% more than are needed for all eligible voters led to claims by Ayad Allawi and his al-Iraqiiya list that these ballots were going to be used to commit fraud. According to the National Iraqi Alliance al-Maliki was abusing his powers as prime minister by distributing government land and plantations freely to tribal leaders to secure their votes, Maliki was also said to be giving expensive guns with gold emblems on them, to visitors. Ibrahim al-Jaafari's Islah party accused the Maliki government of registering 800,000 fabricated names in rural areas and Baghdad so the government could use their names to vote in favour of Maliki while these people do not exist. The Sadr Movement complained that the government was arresting and detaining their supporters in the days prior to the elections to prevent them from voting.

Leaders of al-Iraqiyya listed a series of alleged violations by Maliki claiming some of their votes had been removed from boxes and replaced by other ballots. A spokesman from the alliance released this statement: "Insistence in manipulating these elections forces us to question whether the possibility of fraudulent results would make the final results worthless. We will not stand by with our arms crossed," however analysts claimed Allawi might have listed these complaints for tactical reasons. Iraqiyya candidate Inistar Allawi also accused the Kurdistan List of fraud in Kirkuk. On the other hand, the Kurdish Gorran List alleged that Allawi's al-Iraqiya list had committed fraud in the city of Mosul. Ali al-Adeeb, a candidate for Maliki's State of Law Coalition alleged an election official has manipulated election results in favour of a rival candidate.

Iraqi Kurdish politician Khalid Shenawi, accused election workers in Arab areas in the city of Kirkuk of manipulating the results in Allawi's favour. Meanwhile, Arab and Turkmen politicians accused the Kurds of stacking voter rolls in their favour. Shenawi said that loudspeakers of mosques were used to encourage people to vote and expressed doubt over the 93% turnout in Kirkuk's Arab districts al-Zab, al-Abbasi, al-Riad. In the Arabic neighbourhood of al-Houija there was even a turnout of 130%. Ala Talabani said the Kurdistani List had submitted 40 notices of appeal against fraud by al-Iraqiya. Turkmen nationalist politician Arshid Al-Salihi, who stood as part of the al-Iraqiya list however claimed they had proof of al-Iraqiyya votes being thrown in the garbage, alleging fraud by the Kurdistan List. However, contradictingly he also claimed that "Everyone who loses in elections accuses their rivals of fraud" in reference to claims by the Kurdistan List.

Pro-Western candidate Mithal al-Alusi, whose Mithal al-Alusi List won one seat during last elections for Mithal al-Alusi himself, claimed the elections were rigged against liberals like himself, by Iran and Saudi Arabia as he lost his seat in parliament. Alusi claimed there were major discrepancies between the vote count according to IHEC and his own monitors. He also claimed village directors prevented women from voting in rural areas. He called on the United States to launch an investigation to the allegedly fixed election results.

After an appeal by incumbent Prime Minister Nouri al-Maliki a recount of the votes in Baghdad was ordered on 19 April 2010. The recount began on 3 May 2010. On 14 May IHEC announced that after 11,298 ballot boxes had been recounted, there was no sign of fraud or violations.

== Analysis ==
Some analysts argued that a new government would need to have at least a component that represents minority ethnicities in order to try and "heal old sectarian wounds." This would mean excluding Iraqiya could anger its Sunni vote-base and "reinvigorate a Sunni backlash."

== See also ==
- National Pact (Lebanon)
