= Unity Alliance of Iraq =

- Unity Alliance of Iraq logo
- Leader: Nauaf Saud Zaid
- Founded: 2010
- Seats in the Council of Representatives of Iraq: 0 / 325

The Unity Alliance of Iraq (Arabic: ائتلاف وحدة العراق I’itilaf Wehdat al-Iraq) commonly known as Iraq's Unity, Iraqi Unity or Wassat was an Iraqi political coalition formed to contest the 2010 Iraqi parliamentary election. The coalition was formed by Sheikh Ahmed Abu Risha, the head of the Awakening movement, a Sunni tribal militia which was successful in significantly reducing the insurgency in al-Anbar Governorate and was then reformed into a political party, the Iraq Awakening and Independents National Alliance, which won the most seats in the 2009 Al Anbar governorate election. The Awakening Alliance joined forces with Iraq's Shi'a interior minister Jawad al-Bolani and his secular Iraqi Constitutional Party and Ahmed Abdul Ghafour al-Samarrai, chief of Sunni Endowment Office. The list is led by Jawad al-Bolani.

== 2010 elections ==
During the 2010 elections the Iraq Unity List consisted of the following parties:

- Iraqi Constitution Party – led by Jawad al-Bolani
- Iraq Awakening and Independents National Alliance – led by Abu Risha
- Charter Gathering – led by al-Samarrai
- Republican Gathering – led by Saad al-Janabi
- Independent candidates, including former minister of defence Saadoun al-Dulaimi and Anbar tribal leader Abu Azzam al-Tamimi.

=== Results ===
Governorate	Percentage	Seats Won	Total Seats
Anbar			14
Babil			16
Baghdad			68
Basra			24
Dhi Qar			18
Diyala			13
Karbala			10
Kirkuk			12
Maysan			10
Muthanna			7
Najaf			12
Ninawa			31
Qādisiyyah			11
Salah ad-Din			12
Wasit			11
Compensatory seats			7
Minorities			8
Total:			325
