= 2012–2013 Iraqi protests =

Protests and sectarian violence in Iraq during the post-U.S. insurgency

- Part of the Arab Spring and the Iraqi insurgency (2011–2013)
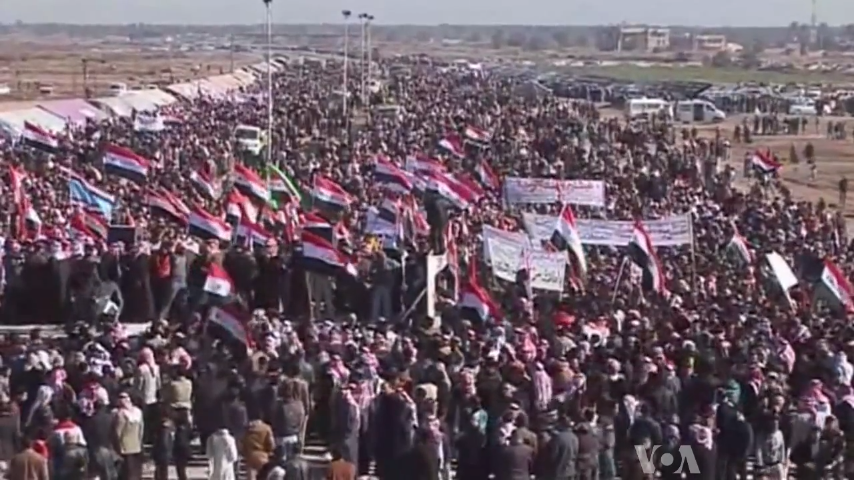
- Sunni demonstrators protesting against the Maliki government (Dec. 2012–Jan. 2013)
- Date: 21 December 2012 – 30 December 2013 (1 year, 1 week and 2 days)
- Location: Iraq
- Caused by: Corruption; Unemployment; Poor national security; Poor public services; Alleged marginalization of a Sunni minority; who previously held ultimate power; Unfair treatment of prisoners; Poor salaries of Sahwa militia; Alleged abuse of De-Ba'athification laws; Alleged Iranian interference in Iraqi affairs
- Methods: Demonstrations; Strike actions
- Result: Two-thirds wage increase for Sahwa militia members; Release of 3,000 prisoners, including 600 female prisoners; Crackdown by Security Forces results in renewed violence in Anbar; Beginning of the War in Iraq (2013–2017)

Parties
(Iraq) Sunni opposition groups: Sunni protesters; (Iraq) Army of Pride and Dignity; Anbar Tribal Council; Free Iraq Intifada; Popular Movement in Iraq; Sunni Islamists; Anti-Government Tribes; Arab Socialist Ba'ath Party – Iraq Region	Government of Iraq: State of Law Coalition; (Iraq) Iraqi Armed Forces; Iraqi Police; Pro-Government Tribes

Lead figures
Decentralized leadership: Rafi al-Issawi (Former Finance Minister); Sheikh Ahmed Abu Risha (Leader of Anbar Salvation Council); Usama al-Nujayfi (Speaker of the Parliament); Sheikh Ali Hatem al-Suleiman (Tribal Leader); Ahmed al-Alwani (Ramadi MP); Sheik Abdul Malik Al-Saadi (Sunni Cleric)	Nouri al-Maliki (Prime Minister of Iraq); Jalal Talabani (President of Iraq)

Casualties
- Deaths: 200+

The former flag of Ba'athist Iraq remerged during the protests as a symbol of Sunni identity in Iraq.

The 2012–2013 Iraqi protests started on 21 December 2012 following a raid on the home of Sunni Finance Minister Rafi al-Issawi and the arrest of 10 of his bodyguards. Beginning in Fallujah, the protests afterwards spread throughout Sunni Arab parts of Iraq. The protests centered on the issue of the alleged sectarianism of Prime Minister Nouri al-Maliki. Pro-Maliki protests also took place throughout central and southern Iraq, where there is a Shia Arab majority. In April 2013, sectarian violence escalated after the 2013 Hawija clashes. The protests continued throughout 2013, and in December Maliki used security forces to forcefully close down the main protest camp in Ramadi, leaving at least ten gunmen and three policemen dead in the process.

== Background ==
Iraqi Sunni minority traditionally held power in Iraq, but the Sunni-dominated Ba'ath party was overthrown by the United States Armed Forces during the 2003 invasion, and Shia majority gained power. The majority of Iraqis are Shiites.

Unlike the protests in 2011, which revolved around issues of corruption and national security, the new protests were driven by Sunni Arabs who felt marginalized in the post-Saddam Iraq, and who claimed that anti-terrorism laws were allegedly being abused and used to arrest and harass Sunnis. The growth of the protests, however, led the initial demands to be expanded, and eventually one of the main requests of the protesters was the resignation of Prime Minister Maliki. Other issues often cited were the alleged abuse of De-Baathification laws and unfair confiscation of property of former Baathists, and alleged Iranian interference in Iraqi affairs.

== Timeline ==
=== 2012 ===
==== December ====
===== 21–27 December =====
The protests began on 21 December 2012 following a raid on the home of Sunni Finance Minister Rafi al-Issawi and the arrest of some of his bodyguards.

Following the arrest several thousand protesters took to the streets of Fallujah following Friday prayers to condemn the arrests. The protesters blocked a highway in Fallujah and demanded Prime Minister Maliki's resignation, waving banners reading: "Resistance is still in our veins." 23 December also saw protesters begin the barricading of the main highway at Ramadi, thereby disrupting a key Iraqi trade route to Jordan and Syria. The protests also spread from Al Anbar Governorate to other Sunni parts of Iraq including Mosul, Samarra Tikrit, and the Adhimiya district of Baghdad. As the protests in Anbar grew, delegations were sent to support to the protests from Baghdad and Saladin Governorate, with smaller delegations coming from the southern Iraqi governorates of Maysan and Basra. In order to try to prevent the further spread of the protests, the Iraqi Army established a cordon in Nineveh Governorate on 27 December.

===== 28 December "Friday of Honour" =====
28 December saw the protests increase in size, with tens of thousands taking part in the "Friday of Honour" protests against perceived government sectarianism.

===== 29 December – 4 January =====
In their second week, the protests spread to Saladin and Diyala Governorates for the first time. During the week protests took place in Mosul, Kirkuk, Baiji, Tikrit, al-Daur, Ishaqi, Samarra, Jalawla, Dhuluiyah, Baquba, Ramadi, Fallujah, Baghdad, Albu Ajil, and Nasiriyah. The sit-in at Ramadi, blocking the highway, continued, and was visited from Amman by Sunni Iraqi Cleric Abdul Malik al-Saadi on 28 December. Tribal delegations traveled to Ramadi from Kirkuk, Karbala, and Muthanna, to support the protests. On 4 January the Baghdad Operations Command ordered the 6th Division to secure the Adhamiyah bridge to prevent sympathetic demonstrators from West Baghdad joining the anti-government demonstrations in the Adhamiyah district of East Baghdad. There were also reports of Iraqi Army units preventing delegations and media personnel from visiting Anbar from Baghdad.

On 30 December Deputy Prime Minister Saleh al-Mutlaq, a Sunni and critic of Maliki, travelled to Ramadi to attempt to address the protesters. Mutlaq's convoy was pelted with bottles and stones, and protesters chanted for him to leave, with some being angry that Mutlaq had taken a week to support the protesters, believing that he had come to undermine the protests. Bodyguards for Mutlaq wounded two people when they fired warning shots. Mutlaq's office described the incident as an attempted assassination by rogue elements.

=== 2013 ===
==== January ====
===== 5–11 January =====
The week of 5 January saw continuing anti-government protests in Mosul, Kirkuk, Tikrit, al-Daur, Samarra, Dhuluiyah, Ramadi, Fallujah, Abu Ghraib, and the Baghdad districts of Adhamiya and Ghazaliyah. The week also saw the emergence of pro-government protests, taking place in Baghdad, along with the southern Shiite cities of Karbala, Kut, Najaf, Diwaniyah, Samawa, and Basra. The week also witnessed renewed government efforts to contain and deter protests, mostly through heightened security and deployments of military units.

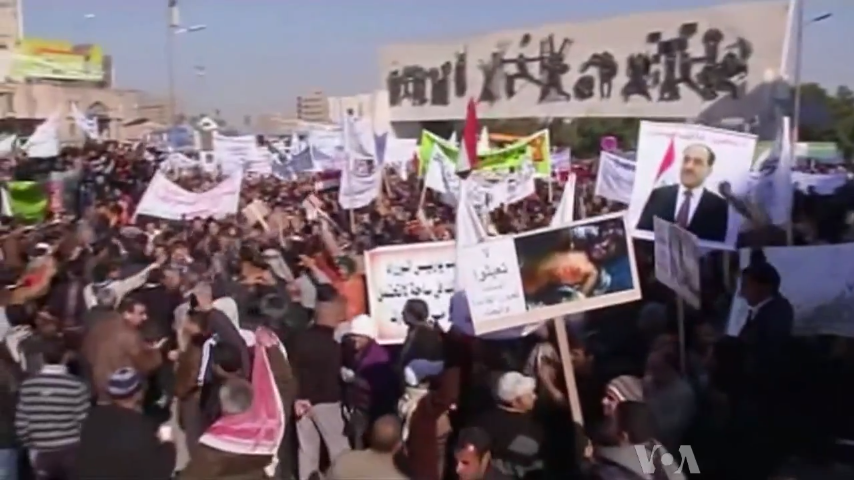
Pro-Maliki demonstrators in January 2013.

Since the beginning of the protests, the Ninewa Operations Command of the Iraqi Army had been attempting to close Ahrar square, which was the site of the majority of anti-government protests in Mosul. Clashes between protesters and army units erupted on 7 January when army vehicles ran over several protesters, wounding 4, in an attempt to disperse the protester in the square. On 8 January four more protesters were wounded when Iraqi military units opened fire in the square. The clashes led to security for eastern Mosul being taken from the military and given to the Iraqi Federal Police 3rd Division.

The Baghdad Operations Command also implemented a cordon in Al Tarmia, a town north of Baghdad, on 7 January in order to prevent protesters from blocking either highway leading north from Baghdad. The Baghdad to Mosul highway was eventually closed near Taji on January 11 by Iraqi army units. The Baghdad Operations Command deployed units on the eastern edge of Fallujah on 9 January. Security within the Adhamiya district of Baghdad was also tightened on 11 January in an effort to deter protests. The 11th Iraqi Army Division was deployed north of Tikrit by the Tigris Operations Command on January 11 to prevent protests in Hawija.

In the west of Iraq units from the 29th Mechanised Brigade of the 7th Army Division closed the Jordan-Iraqi border crossing at Trebil due to unspecified security concerns.

Thousands of pro-Maliki demonstrators took to the streets in at least 5 governorates on Tuesday 8 January to voice support for Maliki and oppose an attempts to change the de-Baathification laws. Protesters also voiced opposition to any return of the Baath party or the dividing of Iraq along sectarian or ethnic lines. Protests took place in Basra, Diwaniyah, Karbala, Al Muthanna and Babil Governorate.

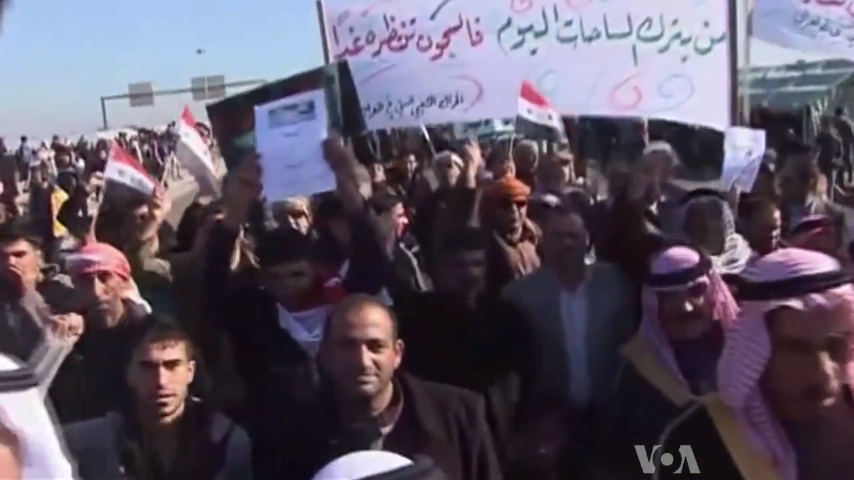
Anti-government demonstrators in Al Anbar Governorate in January 2012.

===== 25 January "No Retreat Friday" =====
On 25 January, several protests were held across Anbar Governorate, with other protests also appearing in Samarra, Baqubah, Kirkuk, Mosul, Baghdad, and Hawija, as part of "No Retreat Friday." The protests turned deadly in Fallujah, as soldiers opened fire on a crowd of rock-throwing demonstrators, killing 7 and injuring more than 70 others. Three soldiers were later shot to death in retaliation for the incident, and clashes erupted in Askari, on the eastern outskirts of Fallujah. Security forces were placed on high alert as a curfew and vehicle ban were brought into effect. In a statement, Maliki urged both sides to show restraint and blamed the incident on unruly protesters. He also warned that it could lead to a "rise in tension that al-Qaida and terrorist groups are trying to take advantage of".

Thousands of people attended the funerals of the slain protesters on 26 January, some carrying Saddam-era Iraqi flags. The government responded to the shooting by pulling out most Army forces from the city and replacing them with federal police. In a statement read at Fallujah's main square, Sheikh Ahmed Abu Risha announced that the tribal leaders had given the government one week to bring the perpetrators of the shooting to justice. If this demand is not met, the Sheikh, who is the chairman of the Anbar Salvation Council, promised to "launch jihad against army units and posts in Anbar".

==== February ====
===== 22 February "'Iraq or Maliki" =====
On 22 February thousands of protesters took to the streets of Ramadi, Baghdad, Mosul, and Fallujah following Friday prayers in order to continue the demonstrations against the Iraqi government, calling for Maliki to step down.

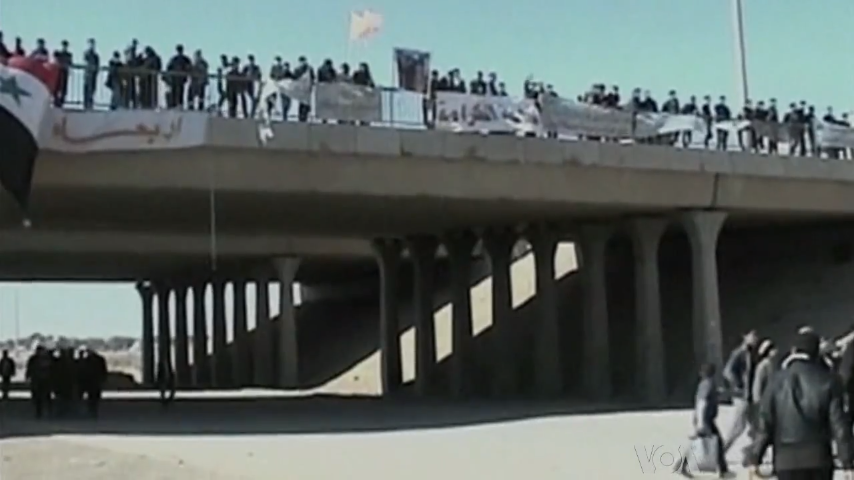
Anti-government demonstrators in Anbar Governorate in January 2012.

The day also saw seven members of a Sahwa militia (originally moderate Sunni tribal groups) killed in Tuz Khormato by armed men wearing military uniforms, presumably al-Qaeda-linked fighters. The assailants asked a local militia leader to accompany them to a checkpoint manned by a Sahwa militia, at which point the uniformed group overpowered the leader and members of the Sahwa militia before executing them.

==== March ====
===== 8–10 March =====
On 8 March police fired on Sunni demonstrators in Mosul, killing 1 protester and injuring 5 others. Police claimed that they fired into the air to disperse stone throwing protesters. In response to the shooting the Minister of Agriculture, Izz al-Din al-Dawla, hosted a televised news conference where he announced his resignation from his cabinet post to protest the killings. Dawla therefore became the second minister of resign as part of the protests, after Rafi al-Issawi.

On 10 March Bunyan Sabar al-Obeidi, an anti-government protest organiser and spokesman for the Sunni protests in Kirkuk, was shot and killed whilst driving his car in Kirkuk in a drive-by shooting by unknown gunmen. Obeidi had escaped an assassination attempt the previous week.

==== April ====
===== Sunni uprising and backlash =====
Following four months of protests, on Friday 19 April, an Iraqi officer was killed in clashes between security forces and protesters in Hawija, a town west of Kirkuk. Following the refusal of residents to hand over suspected perpetrators the security forces sought; Hawija was then put under siege.

On the morning of 23 April, a security forces operation in Hawija resulted in the deaths of about 20 protesters and 3 Iraqi soldiers. Over a hundred people were injured. The clashes erupted after security forces entered the area that was being used as a sit-in by Sunni protesters against the government. Sheikh Abdullah Sami al-Asi, a Sunni provincial official, said the violence resulted from the security forces entering the area and trying to make arrests. There was also retaliatory violence in the surrounding Sunni-majority region where other gunmen attacked police checkpoints in Riyadh and Rashad until a military counterattack a few hours later. On the same day, at least 21 others were killed as they left Sunni mosques in Baghdad and Diyala. Following the raid, Sunni tribal leaders called for a revolt.

The next day revenge attacks continued against the police action. The north of the country featured more violence between security forces and protesters. In Sulaiman Bek, north of Baghdad, gunmen killed five soldiers and wounded five of their colleagues, while gunmen attacked a Sahwa militia checkpoint in Khales and killed four of the militiamen and wounding another person. Total deaths over the two days are believed to be over 100. The Iraqi government also set up a commission to investigate the previous day's incidents, that is to be led by Deputy Prime Minister Saleh al-Mutlaq. On 25 April, Prime Minister Nuri al-Maliki warned of a sectarian war and blamed "remnants of Baath Party for violence."

Following the clashes in Suleiman Bek the Iraqi Army withdrew from the town, with an officer claiming the move was to allow for civilians to leave the town before the army began a counter-offensive. However, clashes and protests continued across the country with renewed protests by Sunni Arabs calling for the prime minister's resignation and an end to alleged discrimination against them. Violence also continued with the death toll reaching 200 after five days. The violence also included attacks on Sunni mosques. Sunni Arabs formed the Army of Pride and Dignity as the sectarian clashes escalated.

On 27 April, the Iraqi government banned 10 satellite channels, including Al Jazeera and Iraq's Al Sharqiya. Mujahid Abu al-Hail of the Communications and Media Commission said: "We took a decision to suspend the licence of some satellite channels that adopted language encouraging violence and sectarianism. It means stopping their work in Iraq and their activities, so they cannot cover events in Iraq or move around." Two days later, five car bombs blew up in Shia-majority areas. In Amara town in Maysan Governorate killing 15 people and wounding 45 others; in Al Diwaniyah a bomb exploded near a restaurant, killing three people and wounding 25 others; while in Karbala a car bomb explosion killed three civilians and wounded 12 others; and another car bomb exploded in the Shia-majority neighbourhood of the Sunni-majority town of Mahmoudiya killing three people and wounding 15 others. The same day, the Iraqiya's Sunni Arab Speaker of Parliament Osama al-Nujaifi called for the resignation of the government to be replaced by a smaller cabinet of independents, who would not compete in the next election, and for the electoral commission to prepare for an early national election with parliament to be dissolved. On 1 May, more attacks took place against a Sunni group of fighters backed by the government and in a Shia area.

==== May ====
On 17 May, at least 72 deaths were reported in several cities, including the capital, on Sunni targets. Attacks continued the next day, amid warning of a civil war after four days of violence resulted in over 140 deaths. On 20 May, bombs in Baghdad and Basra targeting Shias resulted in at least 68 deaths. It also hit Sunni areas such as Samarra. Following a previous week attack on alcohol shops that killed 12 people, the mixed Sunni-Shia area of Zayhouna in Baghdad was attacked again, resulting in the deaths of seven women and five men. On 27 May, over 50 deaths were reported in Shia areas of Baghdad. Prime Minister Nouri al-Maliki later vowed to hunt down the outlaws. On 31 May, following Friday prayers, a bomb exploded outside Baghdad's Sunni Omar mosque killing four people and wounding 11 other worshippers. The UN also noted the death toll for May being the highest in five years with Al Jazeera attributing it to increased sectarianism. Additionally, the government banned cars with common temporary licence plates to try to avoid car bombings.

==== June–November ====
Following the April Hawija clashes, the number of protesters diminished, and sectarian violence increased. In July however, as Ramadan began, the protests intensified for a time.

Provincial elections took place in Anbar in June 2013, and afterwards the new governor, Ahmad Khalaf al-Dhiyabi of the Muttahidoon coalition, began seeking ways to reconcile with Maliki. With the approval of protesters, Dhiyabi began negotiations with the Maliki government on 7 October. On 25 November, Dhiyabi led a delegation to meet with Maliki in Baghdad once again. Maliki agreed to many of the protesters' demands, but reiterated that the protests should be stopped.

==== December ====
By late December Prime Minister Maliki was claiming that the Ramadi protest camp had been turned into a headquarters for the leadership of al-Qaeda. Simultaneously the Iraqi army was conducting an offensive in Al Anbar Governorate against al-Qaeda.

On Saturday 28 December MP Ahmed al-Alwani was arrested in a raid on his home in Ramadi. During the raid Alwani's brother, as well as 5 of his guards were killed. Eight other guards were wounded, whilst 10 members of the security forces were also wounded. Alwani was a prominent supporter of an anti-government protest camp situated on a highway near Ramadi. Reacting to his arrest, influential Sunni cleric Sheik Abdul Malik Al-Saadi urged Sunni protesters to defend themselves.

The following evening, on Sunday 29 December, an Iraqi defense ministry spokesperson claimed on state TV that local Sunni leaders and clerics had agreed to peacefully end the 12 month sit in at the Ramadi protest camp after the Iraqi government had warned them that the camp was a potential shelter for al-Qaeda.

The following day Iraqi security forces dismantled the Ramadi protest camp, however police special forces units claimed they came under fire when trying to enter the camp. At least ten people were killed and a number of police vehicles were attacked and burned, whilst Iraqi government helicopters supported security forces moving in on the camp. Loudspeakers from some Mosques in Ramadi reportedly exhorted people to "go to jihad." A doctor at Ramadi hospital claimed that 10 gunmen had been killed and 30 wounded, whilst 3 policemen were killed and some four police vehicles destroyed.

Several hours later, in reaction to the violence in Ramadi, some 40 Sunni MP's offered their resignations. The MP's demanded the withdrawal of the army from Ramadi and the release of Ahmed al-Alwani. The MP's resignations however will not have effect unless accepted by the parliaments speaker, Usama al-Nujayfi. Sunni politician Saleh al-Mutlaq called for all politicians from the Iraqi National Movement to withdraw from the political process, which he claimed had hit a "dead end." Sheik Abdul Malik Al-Saadi denounced the move against the protest camp, and called on security forces to immediately withdraw in order to avert further bloodshed. Saadi also called the Maliki led Iraqi government a "sectarian government that wants to smash and eradicate the Sunni people in its country," and urged on Sunni politicians to resign from their posts and abstain from the political process.

== Aftermath ==
Following the December 2013 clashes, ISIL launched a campaign in Anbar, taking control of Fallujah and temporarily occupying parts of Ramadi. Tribal militias fought alongside ISIL, and according to Sheikh Ali Hatem al-Suleiman of the Dulaim tribe, ISIL constituted only 5–7% of the anti-government forces. Fighting continued in 2014 and by June, the conflict escalated into a full-scale war, with ISIL at one point controlling over 40% of Iraq.

== Responses ==
=== Domestic ===
==== Government ====
The Iraqi government took steps to appease the protesters. On 29 January 2013 the Iraqi government announced that it would raise the salaries of Sahwa militia members by two-thirds, due to higher wages for Sahwa militia members, along with their incorporation into the security services and civil service being one of the demands of the protest movement. In February 2013 Deputy Prime Minister Hussein al-Shahristani's announced that 3,000 prisoners had been released over the past month and that all female prisoners had been transferred to prisons in their home provinces. Shahristani had previously publicly apologised in January 2013 for holding detainees without charge.

==== Opposition groups ====
- Sadrist Movement – On 1 January 2013, Shiite cleric and politician Muqtada al-Sadr came out in favour of the protests and blamed Prime Minister Nouri al-Maliki for the unrest in Iraq. In a warning to Maliki, Sadr stated: "The Iraqi spring is coming." Sadr even expressed his willingness to travel to Al Anbar Governorate to join in the protests, but stated that his support was conditional on the protests remaining peaceful and did not seek to promote sectarian divisions. Sadr later made a rare television appearance where he prayed alongside Sunni clerics in a landmark Sunni mosque in Baghdad. Sadr however has been criticised due to his previous support for militias and engagement in violence against Sunni's during the Iraq War.
- Ba'ath Party – On 5 January 2013, a 53-minute video was released on YouTube in which Izzat Ibrahim ad-Douri, Secretary of the Iraqi Regional Command of the Arab Socialist Ba'ath Party, stated his support for and encouraged the protests, saying that "the people of Iraq and all its nationalist and Islamic forces support you until the realization of your just demands for the fall of the Safavid-Persian alliance".

=== International ===
- Saudi Arabia – Foreign Minister Prince Saud al-Faisal warned that the Iraqi government needed to address the issue of sectarian extremism in order to restore peace, on January 5 at a press conference in Riyadh.

== See also ==
- Arab Spring
- List of protests in the 21st century
