= Izz al-Din al-Dawla =

Iraqi politician

Izz al-Din al-Dawla is an Iraqi politician who served as the Minister of Agriculture from 21 December 2010 to 8 March 2013.

al-Dawla was elected to the Iraqi Council of Representatives in the December 2005 Iraqi parliamentary election as part of the Iraqi Accord Front. However, in 2008 he resigned from the Front to sit as an independent, complaining about the dominance of the Iraqi Islamic Party within the coalition. He competed in the 2010 Iraqi parliamentary election as part of the Iraqiyya coalition, and was appointed as one of the three Iraqiyya ministers in the government that was formed after the election.

al-Dawla resigned from his post as Minister of Agriculture on 8 March 2013 during a televised news conference as a protest against the killing of a protester by police in Mosul during the Sunni protests in Iraq.
