= 2009 Al Anbar governorate election =

2009 Al Anbar Governorate election
- 31 January 2009

All 29 seats for the Al-Anbar governorate council
- Turnout: 40% (▲38%)
	First party	Second party
Leader	Ahmed Abu Risha	Saleh al-Mutlaq
Party	Iraq Awakening and Independents National Alliance	INDF
Last election	0	0
Seats before	0	0
Seats won	8	6
Seat change	▲8	▲6
Popular vote	56,262	53,487
Percentage	17.7%	16.9%
Swing	▲17.7%	▲16.9%
	Third party	Fourth party
Leader	Tariq al-Hashimi	Jamal Al-Karboli
Party	Intellectuals and Tribes Alliance for Development	National Movement for Development and Reform
Last election	29	0
Seats before	29	0
Seats won	6	3
Seat change	▼23	▲3
Popular vote	51,733	23,835
Percentage	16.3%	7.5%
Swing	▼55%	▲7.5%
Governor of Al Anbar before election
Maamoon Sami Rasheed al-Alwani
IIP
Subsequent Governor
Qasim Al-Fahdawi
Independent

The Al Anbar Governorate election of 2009 was held on 31 January 2009 alongside elections for all other governorates outside Iraqi Kurdistan and Kirkuk.

== Background ==
The governorate is overwhelmingly populated by Sunni Arabs. The sitting governorate council was elected in the 2005 Iraqi governorate elections. These elections took place at the same time as the January 2005 Iraqi legislative election and were boycotted by nearly all Sunni Arab parties. The Iraqi Islamic Party was the only significant Sunni Arab party to put up candidates but they also withdrew from the ballot days before the election.

The turnout in Anbar was 2% for the legislative elections and only 0.5% for the governorate election. Therefore, although the Iraqi Islamic Party has traditionally been stronger in Mosul, they ended up with nearly all the seats on the governorate council.

From 2004, the governorate became a major site of the insurgency in Iraq directed against the Iraq government and occupying United States army. However, the formation in September 2006 of the Anbar Salvation Council was a turning point, and led to the American-backed tribal forces driving al-Qaeda in Iraq and other insurgents out of al-Anbar.

== Campaign ==
More than 520 candidates stood in Anbar, from 37 party lists. The main contest was between the Iraqi Islamic Party which ran the council since 2005 and various parties linked to the Awakening movements formed by tribal leaders and funded by the United States to fight against al-Qaeda in Iraq. Analysts predicted the IIP standing on their own would be "wiped out" in Anbar by the Awakening movements. the Iraqi Islamic Party formed the Coalition of Intellectuals and Tribes together with uniting the Islamic Party, the gathering of Anbar’s Tribal Leaders and Intellectuals, Iraq’s People’s Conference and the Independent Tribal National Gathering.

Lists associated with the Awakening movements included the Iraq Awakening and Independents National Alliance and the National Front for the Salvation of Iraq. The Alliance was led by Sheikh Ahmed Abu Risha, Sheikh Amir Ali al-Sulaiman and Sheikh Hameed al-Hayyes Sheikh al-Hayyes left the Alliance before the election and contested as head of the "Anbar Salvation Council" list.

The National Front was led by Sheikh Ali Hatim, the tribal leader of the Dulaim tribal confederation - the largest in Anbar - and has previously clashed with Abu Risha's brother, Abdul Sattar Abu Risha, when he was the head of the Anbar Salvation Council. The Front claimed the support of the Anbar Salvation Council, the Al-Anbar Awakening Congress, and the Council of Al-Anbar Sheikhs.

The Tribes of Iraq Coalition, headed by Hamid al-Hais is another list which claims to be backed by tribal leaders.

Saleh al-Mutlak's Iraqi National Dialogue Front is the only significant list that doesn't rely on support from tribal leaders, being based on former Ba'ath Party supporters.

== Results ==
Following the vote, supporters of the IIP and the Sahawa gathered in the capital, Ramadi, and started firing in the air to celebrate victory. Iraqi police quickly dispersed the groups and announced a curfew.

Early leaked results indicated that the lists backed by the IIP had won 12 of the 29 seats on the council - the largest number for any party. Sahawa supporters accused the IIP of adding 100,000 fraudulent ballot papers and threatened a violent reaction if it was confirmed. Sheikh Ahmed Abu Risha threatened to "transfer our entity from a political to a military one" and "to fight the Islamic Party and the [Electoral] commission". The IIP condemned the threats of violence saying this behaviour would "take us back to the Middle Ages"

The Deputy Prime Minister of Iraq and IIP member, Rafi al-Issawi, called for a recount with people accused of fraud prosecuted. Iraqi National Dialogue Front leader Saleh al-Mutlaq said most of the lists thought the IIP had manipulated the vote, he had seen fraudulent ballots himself and the vote had been "tainted".

The Electoral Commission said they had received a flood of complaints which they were investigating - including some serious complaints that could alter the outcome of the vote. Commission officials met with Abu Risha, assured him they would not tolerate any forgery and asked him to avoid confrontation with the IIP.

Following the election, the Iraq Awakening and Independents National Alliance nominated as governor Qasim Al-Fahdawi, a businessman who had recently been running a construction company in the United Arab Emirates. He was elected by 24 votes to 3 and formed a government including all parties except for the Iraqi Islamic Party's three members. Dr. Jassim al-Halbusi was elected chairman of the provincial council.

Party	Votes	%	Seats	+/–
Iraq Awakening	56,262	17.74	8	+8
Hiwar	53,487	16.87	6	+6
Coalition of Intellectuals and Tribes	51,733	16.32	6	−28
Al Hal	23,835	7.52	3	+3
Iraqi National List	21,551	6.80	2	+2
Iraqi National Unity Coalition	14,439	4.55	2	+2
Tribes of Iraq Coalition	13,798	4.35	2	+2
Other parties	81,969	25.85	0	–
Total	317,074	100.00	29	−12
Source: Niqash, Al Sumaria, New York Times
