= Intellectuals and Tribes Alliance for Development =

The Intellectuals and Tribes Alliance for Development or Coalition of Intellectuals and Tribes was an Iraqi political list which stood in the 2009 Al Anbar governorate election. The list was created by the then ruling Iraqi Islamic Party because their popularity had severely decreased. They formed an alliance together with the Coalition of Intellectuals and Tribes together with uniting the Islamic Party, the gathering of Anbar’s Tribal Leaders and Intellectuals, Iraq’s People’s Conference and the Independent Tribal National Gathering. The list won 15.9% of the vote and 6 out of 29 seats.
