= Ahmed Abu Risha =

Iraqi tribal leader

Sheikh Ahmed Bezaa Abu Risha
- أحمد أبو ريشة
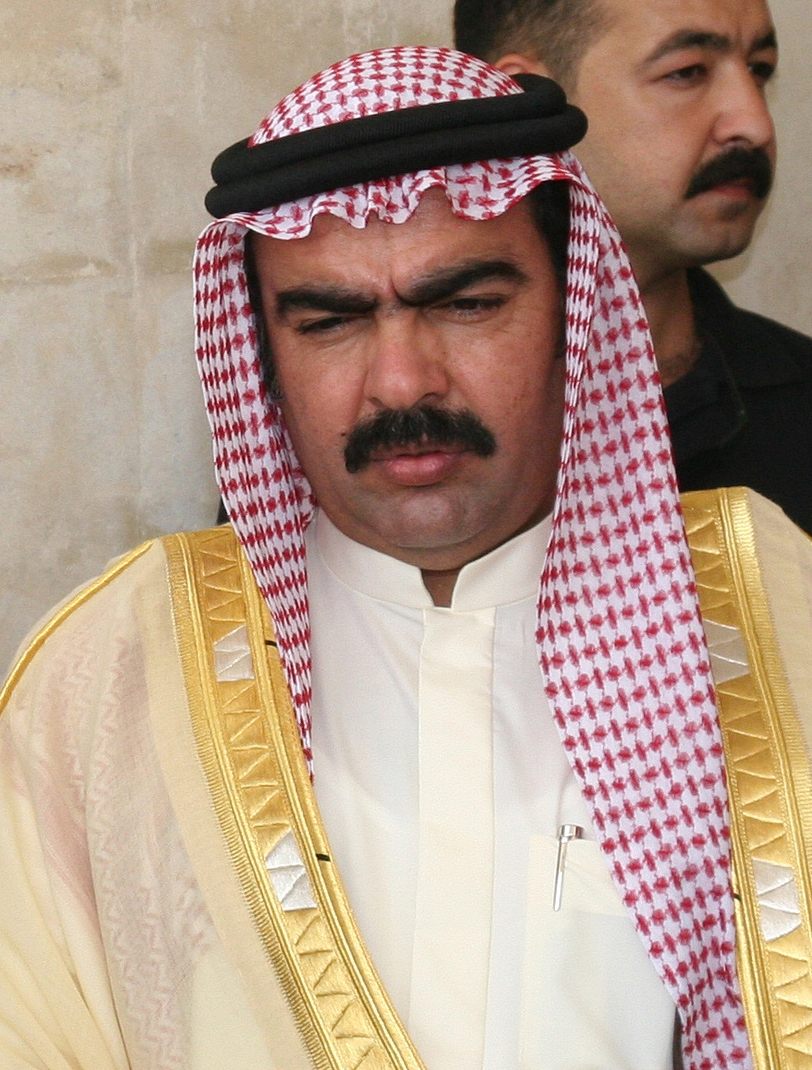
- Abu Risha in 2009.
- Born: 1969 (age 56–57); Anbar, Ba'athist Iraq
- Occupation: Sunni tribal chief in Al-Anbar
- Known for: "Anbar Awakening" - opposing al-Qaeda in Iraq
- Political party: Unity Alliance of Iraq
- Relatives: Abdul Sattar Abu Risha (younger brother)

Sheikh Ahmed Bezaa Abu Risha (Arabic: أحمد أبو ريشة) is an Iraqi Sunni tribal leader in Al-Anbar. He led the movement of Sunni tribesmen known as the Anbar Salvation Council.

== Early life ==
Abu Risha was born in 1969 and is three years older than his brother Abdul Sattar Buzaigh al-Rishawi. He is a member of the Dulaim tribe.

== Career ==
=== Anbar Awakening ===
On 13 September 2007, his brother Abdul Sattar Buzaigh al-Rishawi was killed along with two of his bodyguards by a roadside bomb near his home in Ramadi, Anbar, Iraq. Sheik Ahmed was selected to take over as leader of the Anbar Salvation Council by the Sheiks of Anbar province. The Sheik met with President Barack Obama both before and after the 2008 Presidential Election. As of November 2008, Abu Risha had a newspaper entitled Sahwat al-Iraq (Iraq's Awakening).

=== Politics ===
The Iraq Awakening and Independents National Alliance, a political coalition led by Abu Risha, was the most successful political coalition in the 2009 Anbar governorate election, winning 8 of 29 seats.

The Iraqi Salvation Council under the leadership of Shaykh Ahmed Abu Risha has just joined the newly created the Iraqi Unity Alliance, along with over 26 political parties, the most important ones, Iraqi Constitutional Party with former Interior Minister Jawad al-Bulani, Shaykh Ahmed al-Samarai, President of the Sunnis Waqf or Council, National Independent Assembly with Shaykh Omar Hechel, Saadoun al-Dulaimi, a former Minister of Defense, and so many others, because the list is still open for others to join the Alliance.

The Alliance went on to fare poorly at the 2010 parliamentary election, winning only 2.66% of the vote, and 4 seats. The Alliance seemed to lose most votes to the Iraqi National Movement, led by Ayad Allawi. The Alliance's poor showing has been blamed on the Awakening Movements failure to deliver rapid economic improvements, and of Sunni Arab's turning away from the party due to Abu Risha's closeness to Nour al-Maliki prior to the election.

Abu Risha joined forces with other pro-Sunni protest and pro-Federalism groups, joining the Uniters List for the 2013 Anbar governorate election. The List was the most successful single party, although lost seats when compared to how the composite members fared in the 2009 election. Although he supports the protest movement, Abu Risha opposes the creation of a Sunni Federal region similar to that of Iraqi Kurdistan.

==== Positions ====
Abu Risha has been critical of Iranian interference in Iraq. Following his takeover of the Anbar Salvation Council after the death of his brother, the Sheikh criticised what he described as Iranian pressure on Prime Minister Nour al-Maliki, although he shied from criticizing Maliki himself. He has accused Iran as interfering in Iraqi affairs, and of using religion as a weapon with which to pursue their own national interests. He has also accused the de-Baathification committee as being a weapon of Iranian interests in Iraq. He has criticised US disengagement from Iraq under President Barack Obama as being equivalent to the US handing Iraq over to Iran.

In 2010 Abu Risha described the Sahwa, of which he is a major leader, as transitioning from the original armed movement that had fought al-Qaeda into a secular and liberal political movement that respects all religions and freedoms.

Abu Risha has been critical of Islamists and religious parties in Iraq, stating that Iraqi's don't need anyone to tell them about their religious affairs, but instead desire good and stable lives, and a government that respects the rights of religions and minorities. Abu Risha has instead supported secular and nationalistic parties.

He has supported movements to let more Syrian refugees into Iraq, stating, “We are Muslims, they are Muslims. We are Arabs, they are Arabs, and we are happy to help them.”

==== Support for Sunni protesters and tension with Maliki ====
Abu Risha has been supportive of the 2012–2013 Iraqi protests. Following the killing of 5 rock throwing demonstrators by Iraqi soldiers in January 2013, Abu Risha read a statement at Fallujah's main square announcing that tribal leaders had given the government one week to bring the perpetrators of the shooting to justice. Abu Risha claimed that if this demand was not met then he promised to "launch jihad against army units and posts in Anbar". In response the Iraqi government removed his protective detail in late January 2013, although Anbar tribes offered to ensure his security instead.

Abu Risha's tense relationship with Nour al-Maliki and support for the protest movement led to the Iraqi government supporting the re-election of the Sahwa leadership in February 2013. Sheikh Wissam al-Hardan was then elected over Abu Risha, in a re-election Abu Risha condemned as being imposed by the government.

He has claimed that the Mukhtar Army was created and operates with the government's consent, and that despite government calls for the arrest of the group's leaders, he claims that if the government wanted to arrest the group's leadership they would have acted far sooner. He has denounced the creation of the Mukhtar Army, which claims to exist to protect Shiites, claiming that the Iraqi Army is capable of protecting Iraq's Shiite population, and that instead the aim of the Mukhtar Army is to frighten and intimidate Sunni protesters.

Abu Risha has also criticized the Iraqi government for neglecting the Sahwah militias, accusing the government of failing to pay the salaries of militia members and of not providing the militias with arms. The government has in turn accused Abu Risha of supporting al-Qaeda militants in Iraq, claims which Abu Risha denies, especially given that he has lost 26 members of his family, including his brother, in the fight against al-Qaeda in Iraq.

Preceded by Sheik Abdul Sattar Buzaigh al-Rishawi	Anbar Salvation Council; 2007–2013	Succeeded by Sheikh Wissam al-Hardan
