= Tribes of Iraq Coalition =

The Tribes of Iraq Coalition (List 398) also known as the Anbar Salvation Council is an Iraqi political coalition formed to contest the 2009 Al Anbar governorate election which won 2 out of 29 seats. The party was one of several formed out of the Awakening movements - Sunni tribal militias armed and financed by the United States Army to fight al-Qaeda in Iraq. The coalition was led by Sheikh Hamid al-Hais. In an interview with the Washington Post prior to the election, Hais said he would kill all the Iraqi Islamic Party's candidates if anything happened to any of his candidates.

They joined the National Iraqi Alliance for the 2010 Iraqi Elections.
