= Ahmad Khalaf al-Dulaimi =

Iraqi politician (born 1968)

Governor Ahmad Khalaf Muhammad al-Dulaimi Arabic: أحمد خلف محمد الدليمي

Governor of Anbar
- In office 20 August 2013 – 24 December 2014
- Appointed by: August 2013
- Preceded by: Qasim Al-Fahdawi
- Succeeded by: Suhaib al-Rawi

Personal details
- Born: March 7, 1968 (age 58) Al-Ramadi, Iraq
- Occupation: Politician

Ahmad Khalaf al-Dulaimi (Arabic: أحمد خلف الدليمي, also Ahmad Khalaf Muhammad al-Dulaimi, Ahmed Khalaf Dheyabi) is an Iraqi politician and was the Governor of Al Anbar province from August 2013 to December 2014.

The Anbar governorate election was held in June 2013, amidst on-going demonstrations in Sunni Arab majority areas. The elections in Anbar were topped by the pro-protest 'Uniters List', which allied the al-Hadba party of Usama al-Nujayfi, the speaker of the Council of Representatives of Iraq with the Iraqi Islamic Party, which had controlled al-Anbar governorate from 2005 to 2009. The previous governor, Qasim Al-Fahdawi, was a businessman who had been nominated by the Awakening parties that had won the 2009 elections.

He served 2007-09 as Director of Internal Security for Al-Anbar Governorate, and before that as an instructor at the Iraqi Military Academy. He is married and has six children.

Ahmad Khalaf al-Dulaimi, a protest organizer from the Iraqi Islamic Party, was eventually chosen as the new Governor. He was sworn in on Tuesday 20 August 2013.

After being sworn in, al-Dulaimi met with protest leaders, and vowed to defend them should they be targeted by any party.

Ahmad Khalaf al-Dulaimi was wounded in the head and chest on September 7, 2014 during an operation against anti-government forces in the town of Barwana, al-Anbar Province. He was flown to Amman, Jordan for treatment, and then to Berlin, Germany. One member of al-Dulaimi's security team and seven soldiers were killed in the attack. In December 2014 the Anbar Provincial Council moved to have the governor retired, and he was replaced by Suhaib al-Rawi.
