= Suhaib al-Rawi =

Iraqi politician

Suhaib al-Rawi صهيب الراوي

Governor of Anbar
- In office 24 December 2014 – 29 August 2017
- Appointed by: Anbar Provincial Council
- President: Fuad Masum
- Preceded by: Ahmad Khalaf al-Dulaimi

Personal details
- Born: 1966 (age 59–60) Rawa, Anbar Governorate, Kingdom of Iraq
- Party: Iraqi Islamic Party
- Other political affiliations: Muttahidoon

Suhaib al-Rawi (Arabic: صهيب الراوي; born 1966) is an Iraqi politician and the former Governor of Anbar until August 2017. He is a member of the Iraqi Islamic Party.

== Political career ==
On 23 December 2014, the Anbar Provincial Council voted in al-Rawi as the next Governor of the province. 18 out of the 30 members of the council voted for al-Rawi during a meeting held in Baghdad. Previously, on 13 December, the council had voted to make al-Rawi's predecessor, Ahmad Khalaf al-Dulaimi, retire due to injuries he had received. On 24 December, the President of Iraq, Fuad Masum, approved al-Rawi's appointment in a decree, which was announced on 28 December.

According to Ayub Nuri, writing for Rudaw, "It is said that the people of Anbar support him and he has a genuine following" because he "has so far remained neutral between the tribes and the government and rather focused on his job as governor." In late February 2015, al-Rawi met with tribal elders from Anbar, led by Sheikh Rafi Abd al-Karim al-Fahdawi, where they stressed that "Anbar must not be liberated but by its people" rather than by those from outside the province.

On 13 August 2015, al-Rawi announced that he was dismissing all of his aides and advisers as part of the Prime Minister of Iraq Haider al-Abadi's reform plans to crack down on corruption within government. Al-Rawi also announced that he was dismissing all the district managers who had been in their jobs for more than four years or performed poorly. Reuters wrote that al-Abadi's "reform drive is especially important in Anbar, the Sunni heartland in western Iraq where the Baghdad government is focusing its offensive against Islamic State, which has seized large swathes of the country's north and west including the Anbar capital Ramadi." Al-Rawi also said that future appointments would be made "on the basis of experience and competence" and "according to need and specialization".

He was removed from his office by the Anbar Provincial Council in June 2016 on charges of misusing powers, negligence, and deliberate delinquency. al-Rawi rejected the decision and demanded a public interrogation. He was dismissed from his position as governor on 29 August by the council after a majority of its members voted to remove him over charges of financial and administrative corruptions. However, he refused to relinquish his position and the dismissal order was revoked by a court on 14 November. In response, the council froze his financial powers the following day. It however revoked his dismissal after the election of its new president on 26 November.
