= Ala Talabani =

Kurdish politician

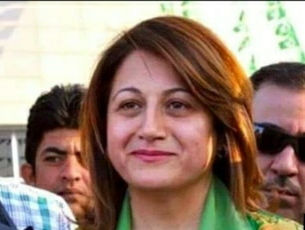

Personal details
- Born: Ala Tahseen Talabani Kirkuk, Iraq
- Relatives: Jalal Talabani (uncle)

Ala Talabani (Kurdish: ئاڵا تاڵەبانی) is a Kurdish politician and former head of the Patriotic Union of Kurdistan bloc in the Iraqi parliament. She is a three-time member of the Council of Representatives of Iraq.

== Early life and education ==
Ala Tahseen Talabani was born in the Kurdish Iraqi city of Kirkuk. She graduated from Palestine high school for girls. She is one of the nieces of former President of Iraq, Jalal Talabani.

== Career ==
In 1986, Talabani became a member of the Patriotic Union of Kurdistan (PUK). She was kept in custody for two days and lost her teaching and engineering jobs for being an ethnic Kurd and refusing to join the Ba'ath Party. She left Iraq for the UK in 1991 following Saddam Hussein's anti-Kurdish policies. Here she was a member of a delegation which met the British prime minister Tony Blair.

After the fall of Saddam Hussein, she returned to Iraq. With Zainab Al-Suwaij, Talabani established a group called the Kurdish Women's Union (later known as Women for a Free Iraq) and is also a co-founder of the High Council for Iraqi Women.

Talabani opposed the Resolution 137 of the Iraqi Interim Governing Council, which if passed would have eroded the rights of women in Iraq.

== Political Life ==
Talabani was one of the members of the Kurdistan Alliance (KA) elected to the Iraqi Transition National Assembly in January 2005. The same year, she entered the Council of Representatives of Iraq and retained her membership following the 2010 Iraqi parliamentary election. In 2014, she became the only woman from Kirkuk Province to win the 2014 parliamentary elections by a popular vote. She is the leader of PUK in the Council of Representatives.
