= Iraqi Constitutional Party =

Iraq political party

The Iraqi Constitutional Party is a political party in Iraq that was founded by Jawad Bulani in June 2005. The party is considered to be moderate and non-sectarian based. The party performed well for a non-sect based party in the governorate elections of 2009, leading to one seat in the Salah ad-Din Governorate and two in the Wasit Governorate. The party is led by Jawad al-Bulani. For the 2010 Iraqi Elections they joined Sheikh Abu Risha's Iraq Unity List. Iraqi Constitutional Party won 3 seats in Wasit but did not win any Salah Ad Din.
