= Abdel-Karim Mahoud al-Mohammedawi =

Interim Iraq Governing Council member

Abdel-Karim Mahoud al-Mohammedawi was a member of the Interim Iraq Governing Council created following the United States's 2003 invasion of Iraq. A Shia Muslim, al-Mohommedawi led the resistance against Saddam Hussein's government in the southern marsh regions of Iraq, where he gained the title "Commander [Emir, often mistranslated as Prince] of the Marshes." He was imprisoned for six years under the Hussein regime and currently leads the Iraqi political group Hezbollah in Amarah.

After the invasion of Iraq in 2003, he organised a militia in Maysan governorate which prevented looting. These militia later joined the Maysan police. His brother was appointed governor of Maysan. In 2004 he was criticised when six unemployed demonstrators were shot outside the governor's house.

Hezbollah (Iraq) joined the United Iraqi Alliance coalition in the Iraqi legislative election of January 2005. He was the Trade Minister in the Iraqi Transitional Government from May 2005 until May 2006. His deputy, Jawad al-Bolani, was the Interior Minister of Iraq from 2006 to 2010.

Hezbollah has clashed violently with the Islamic Virtue Party which controlled the Basra Province until 2009.
