= Ali Hatem al-Suleiman =

Iraqi Tribal Leader

- علي حاتم السليمان
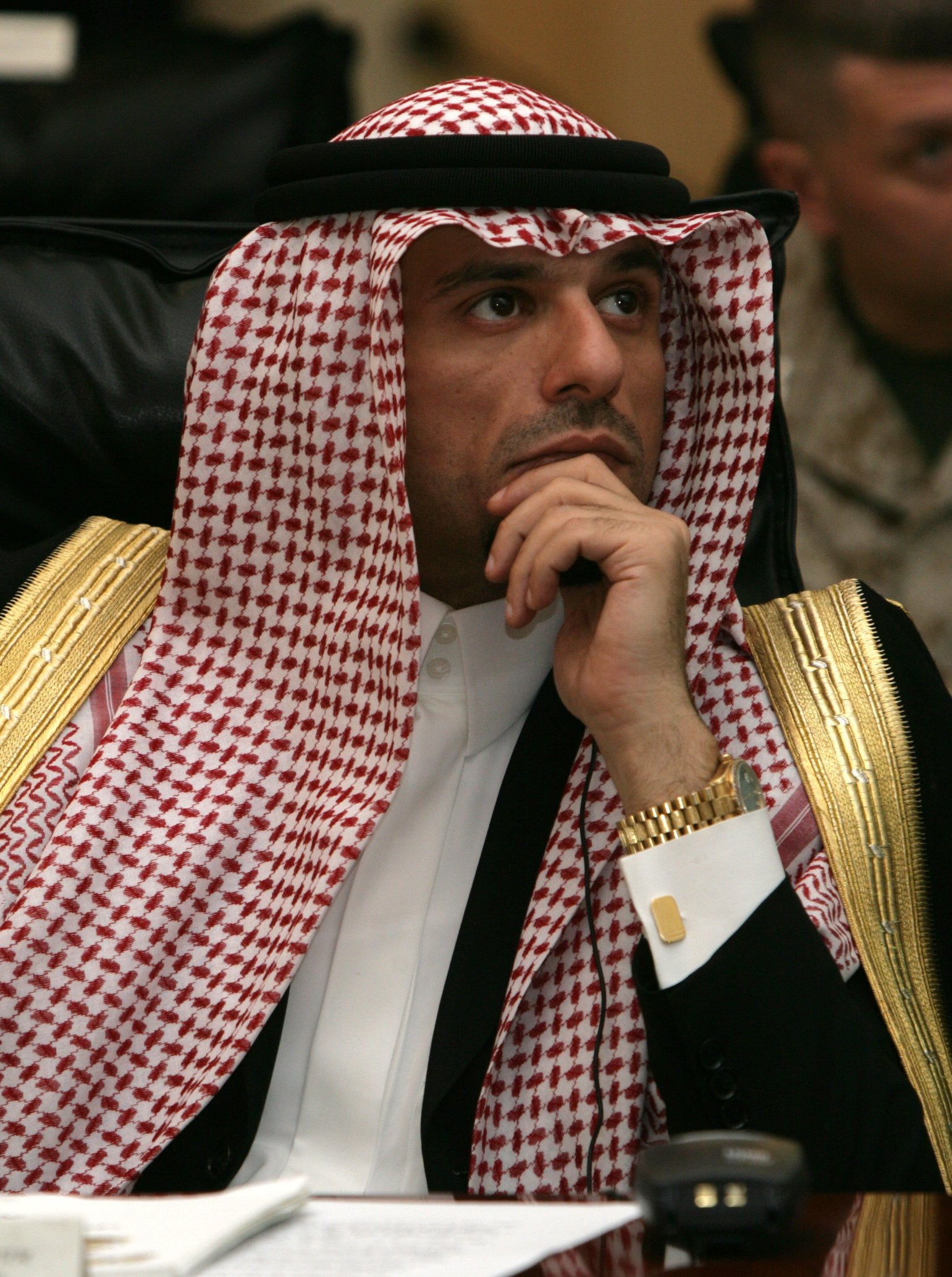
- Born: 1971 (age 54–55); Baghdad, Ba'athist Iraq
- Occupation: Sunni tribal chief in Al Anbar Province
- Known for: Participation in the Sons of Iraq movement

Ali Hatem Abd al-Razzaq Ali al-Suleiman al-Assafi al-Dulaimi (Arabic: علي حاتم السليمان; born 1971), better known as Ali Hatem al-Suleiman, is an Iraqi Sunni tribal leader who is the leader of the Dulaim tribe, in the Al Anbar Governorate.

== Early life ==
Ali was born in Baghdad in 1971. His father, Abdul-Razzaq, was the emir of the Dulaim tribe, one of the largest Arab tribes in Iraq. His grandfather, Ali al-Suleiman, led the confederation during the founding of Iraq. Its members are predominantly located in the Al Anbar Governorate.

== Iraq War ==
Following the 2003 invasion of Iraq, Ali joined the Iraqi insurgency. His own tribe formed the nucleus of the resistance/insurgency against US forces and Shiite government forces in Iraq, due to the bombing of Fallujah and the targeting of Sunnis in Baghdad. However, in 2006 he and his armed tribesmen turned against Al-Qaeda, due to their often indiscriminate use of violence, as well as the fact that Al-Qaeda in Iraq did not give enough respect to Anbar's sheikhs. Ali joined the Sons of Iraq movement, although he looked down on its leader, Sheikh Abdul Sattar Abu Risha, due to the small size of the Abu Risha tribe.

After leaving the insurgency, Ali became an important figure in Anbar. He formed a local police force of 60,000 gunmen from his tribe in Anbar.

Ali formed a political party, National Front for the Salvation of Iraq, in 2008. It ran as part of the State of Law Coalition of Prime Minister Nouri al-Maliki, but quickly disagreements appeared, after the arrest of 10 men from his tribe in Ar Rutba, by the Karbala police. In response to the incident, Ali threaten to declare the State of Anbar. Ali formed another party (Baariq Iraq). However, his political party was banned from participating in the elections in 2014.

After the withdrawal of US troops, the Shiite government forces started to arrest Dulaimi civilians and killed them in Anbar. Ali, his brother Sheikh Abd al-Razzaq, and other sheikhs of the tribe set up weekly demonstrations in Ramadi in the Square of Pride and Dignity, for one year, demanding the release of Sunni detainees and the withdrawal of the army from the cities in Anbar. The government responded by killing ali al-Alwani and arresting his brother, Sunni MP Ahmed al-Alwani, from the Dulaim tribe (Albo-alon clan). As a result, the Dulaimis returned to the armed insurgency led by Ali.

Ali formed the Military Council of the tribal rebels in Al-Anbar. He announced in a statement that Sunni territories will not be part of Iraq under Shiite rule.

== 2013–14 anti-government offensives ==
Flag of Ali's group, the Revolutionary Tribal Council.

In 2013 and 2014, Ali was the leader of the Anbar Tribes Revolutionary Council, an anti-government militant group active in the Anbar clashes. Ali was involved in the 2014 Northern Iraq offensive.

In early 2015, during the Battle of Ramadi, ISIL overran Ali's lands in Anbar Province and forced him to retreat to Erbil, The capital and largest city of the Kurdistan Region

== See also ==
- Adnan Ismail Najm al-Bilawi Al-Dulaimi
- Tanzim Qaidat al-Jihad fi Bilad al-Rafidayn
- Sons of Iraq
