= Anbar Tribal Council =

Iraqi Sunni militant group

- Flag of the Anbar Tribal Council
- Founding leader: Ali Hatem al-Suleiman
- Dates active: 2013–2015
- Ideology: Sunni Islamism; Anbar regionalism Arab-Islamic nationalism Anti-Shia sentiment

The Anbar Tribal Council (Arabic: مجلس عشائر الأنبار), also called the Tribal Revolutionaries (ثوار العشائر), was an armed group and an alliance of Iraqi Sunni Arab tribes formed in December 2013 in Al-Anbar Governorate during the Iraq war.

== History ==
The group was formed in December 2013, at the beginning of the Anbar campaign against the Shia government of Nouri al-Maliki. On January 4, 2014, the group fully seized Fallujah and parts of Ramadi.

While most other Sunni groups aimed to overthrow the Iraqi government, the Anbar Tribal Council was focused on capturing Anbar and establishing their own region without Iraqi government interference.

The group fought in the 2014 Northern Iraq offensive, and its founder and leader Ali Hatem al-Suleiman claimed that the Islamic State only constituted 5–7% of the anti-government forces. He also claimed that his group was able to defeat the Islamic State were the Maliki government to withdraw government forces from north and north-central Iraq. However, he also claimed that his group would not fight the Islamic State until Maliki was out of office and Sunnis were given their rights.

The group dissolved in early 2015, after the Battle of Ramadi, in which the Islamic State captured all of its land and destroyed its manpower. Ali Hatem al-Suleiman fled to the autonomous Kurdistan Region.
