= Jamal Al-Karboli =

Iraqi activist and politician (born 1965)

Jamal Naser Delli Ahmed Al-Karboli
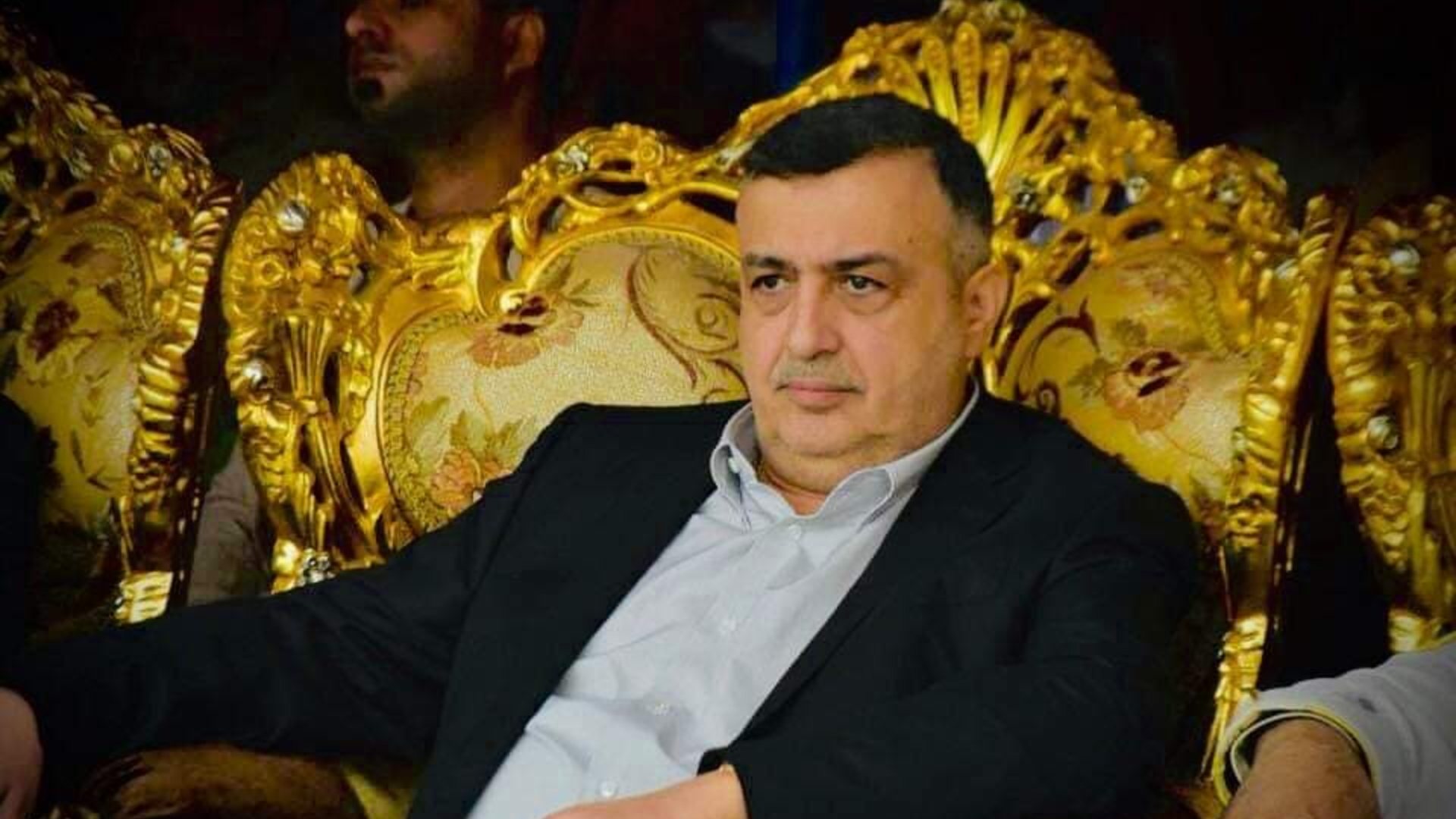

General secretary of Al-Hal
- Incumbent
- Assumed office 2009

Personal details
- Born: 10 October 1965 (age 60) Musayyib, Babil, Iraq
- Party: al-Hal
- Education: University of Baghdad

Jamal Naser Delli Ahmed Al-Karboli (Arabic: جمال الكربولي, born October 10, 1965) is an Iraqi activist and politician, head of the National Movement for Development and Reform party and the Iraqi List coalition in the Council of Representatives of Iraq.

== Background and early life ==
Al Karboli is sheikh of the Al-Karabla clan, the largest of the Dulaim clans in the Al Anbar Governorate in Iraq, who claim lineage from Al-Zubaid, and their great-grandfather, the Arab knight the venerable Companion Amro Bin Maad Yakroob; however, Karabla city is located to the west of Anbar, and leadership of the Al-Karabla clan is still in this household.

Jamal Al-Karboli was born in Al-Museib, the largest sub-district in Babylon historical governorate, of two Iraqi parents, and has four male siblings. He received his preparatory school certificate from the First of June Secondary School for male students (1982–1983) with distinction, which enabled him to join the College of Medicine at Baghdad University, where he had completed his studies in 1990–1991. He received a bachelor's degree in medicine and general surgery/College of Medicine –Baghdad University (1990–1991)

== Social and humanitarian activity ==
He worked in the Iraqi Red Crescent duties as a volunteer until he was elected the president of the Iraqi Red Crescent Society, the only government-approved source for many state, UN humanitarian organizations, governmental or non-governmental, in Iraq. He has been awarded many prizes, certificates of merits and honorary degrees.

He also worked in distribution programs of food and relief support for poor families and orphans, and implementing skill rehabilitation and development programs for women widow providing them with sewing machines in order to improve their family living standards. He also contributed to patronizing youth gifts, supporting their sport and education needs, the formation and preparation of sports teams and fostering them through the arrangement of regular championships in many governorates, with the aim of helping them develop their capacities and keep them away from violence culture and arms. The programs also aimed to provide individual skills in computing, English language, and media activities, in order to improve their families' standard of living. He also supported the implementation of programs providing orphan children with school supplies, clothes, and administering courses in Koran recital, English language, and computing.

== Political activity ==
Al-Karboli began political activism during the 2003 invasion of Iraq. During the Fallujah killings of April 2003, he participated with a large working team to provide medical supplies, support of food, relief and logistics to whoever needed them. He provided a similar role during the conflict in Najaf, Tal Afar and other governorates of Iraq.

He subsequently announced the birth of the National Movement for Development and Reform (ALHAL). It started by a congregation of a large mass of clan, social prominent Iraqi personalities with the aim to activate, concentrate and consolidate the efforts of Iraqi patriotic clans, with the slogan of “non- sectarian patriotism and democracy for individual factional sectarianism”. The party has membership in the governorates of Salah Aldin, Baghdad, Mosul, Kirkuk, Diyala, middle and south Iraq regions, and therein many technocrats and professional Iraqis have joined efforts.

== Political involvement ==
- National Movement for Reform and Development (ALHAL): Secretary-general and founder, with branches and activities in the following governorates: Baghdad, Anbar, Saladin, Diyala, Nineveh, Kirkuk, and Dhi Qar.
- Planning and supervising the first participation of the movement in the governorates' council elections/ January 2009 at six governorates level, the movement was rated within the first ten political entities most influential across Iraq.
- Political Coalition of Iraqi List: member on the leadership of the Iraqi coalition and major contributor in the establishment of the Iraqi coalition winner in the Iraqi election for 2010.
- Head of the National Movement for Reform and Development delegation to meet with Hashemite Kingdom of Jordan officials.
- Head of the National Movement for Reform and Development delegation to meet with Syrian Arab Republic officials.
- Planning and supervising the first participation of the movement in the parliamentary elections/ March 2010 at seven governorates level, where twelve parliamentary seats were gained and got the 3rd rank as to the number of seats within the Iraqi coalition.
- Head of the National Movement for Reform and Development delegation to meet with the UAE officials.
- Head of the National Movement for Reform and Development delegation to meet with the Kuwait officials.
- Head of the National Movement for Reform and Development delegation to meet with the Turkey Republic officials.
- Head of the National Movement for Reform and Development delegation to meet with the Kurdistan Iraq territory presidency/ president Massoud Barzani – Erbil, October 2010.
- Head of the National Movement for Reform and Development delegation to meet with the president Jalal Talbani – Sulaymaniyah, October 2010.
- Member of the leadership of Iraqi coalition delegation to the special Turkey meetings, October 2010.
- Member of the Leadership of Iraqi Coalition delegation to Erbil meetings dedicated to the formation of Iraqi government, November 2010.
- Formulate, materialize and adopt initiative project (ALHAL) to bring the view points closer and expedite the formation of Iraqi government.

== Roles and affiliations ==
Al-Karboli was Vice president of Youth Committee in the Secretariat-General of the International Federation of Red Cross and Red Crescent Societies in Geneva, then vice president of institutional and administrative development committee in the secretariat-general of the International Federation of Red Cross and Red Crescent Societies, and then in the International Federation of the Red Cross and Red Crescent Societies Conference convened in South Korea 2005.

He was vice-president of the Iraqi Red Crescent Society in 1998, and after leaving the role in 2000 he became the president of the Society in May 2003, then secretary-general in 2004; he, however, led Human and Relief Rescue Teams in the first and second Fallujah battles, Najaf first and second Battles, Basra and Mosul battles in the years 2004, 2005, and 2006.

He was an eye surgery senior intern at the Yarmouk Educational Hospital, and a military doctor, lieutenant rank, until he was referred to retirement for health reasons in 1993.

- Vice president of the International Youth Committee / International Federation of Red Cross and Red Crescent Societies – Geneva (2005–2008)
- Member of the International Youth Committee/ International Federation of Red Cross and Red Crescent Societies – Geneva (2001–2005)
- Member of Iraqi Medical Association (1991–present)
- Board Member of the Iraqi Red Crescent Society (1994–1998/2003-2008)
- Volunteer in the Iraqi Red Crescent Society (1985–present)
