= Highway 1 (Iraq) =

Road in Iraq

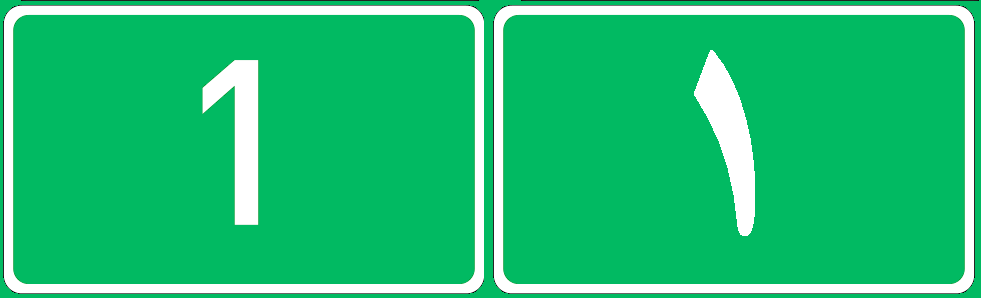
Highway 1
- ١ طريق رقم

Route information
- Part of

Major junctions
- From: Baghdad
- To: Qamishli (Syria)

Location
- Country: Iraq

Highway system
- Highways in Iraq

Highway 1 is an Iraqi highway which extends from Baghdad to Qamishli in Syria. It connects Baghdad directly to Anbar’s provincial capital of Ramadi and passes through Baqubah, Taji, Samarra, Tikrit and Mosul.
