= Saadoun al-Dulaimi =

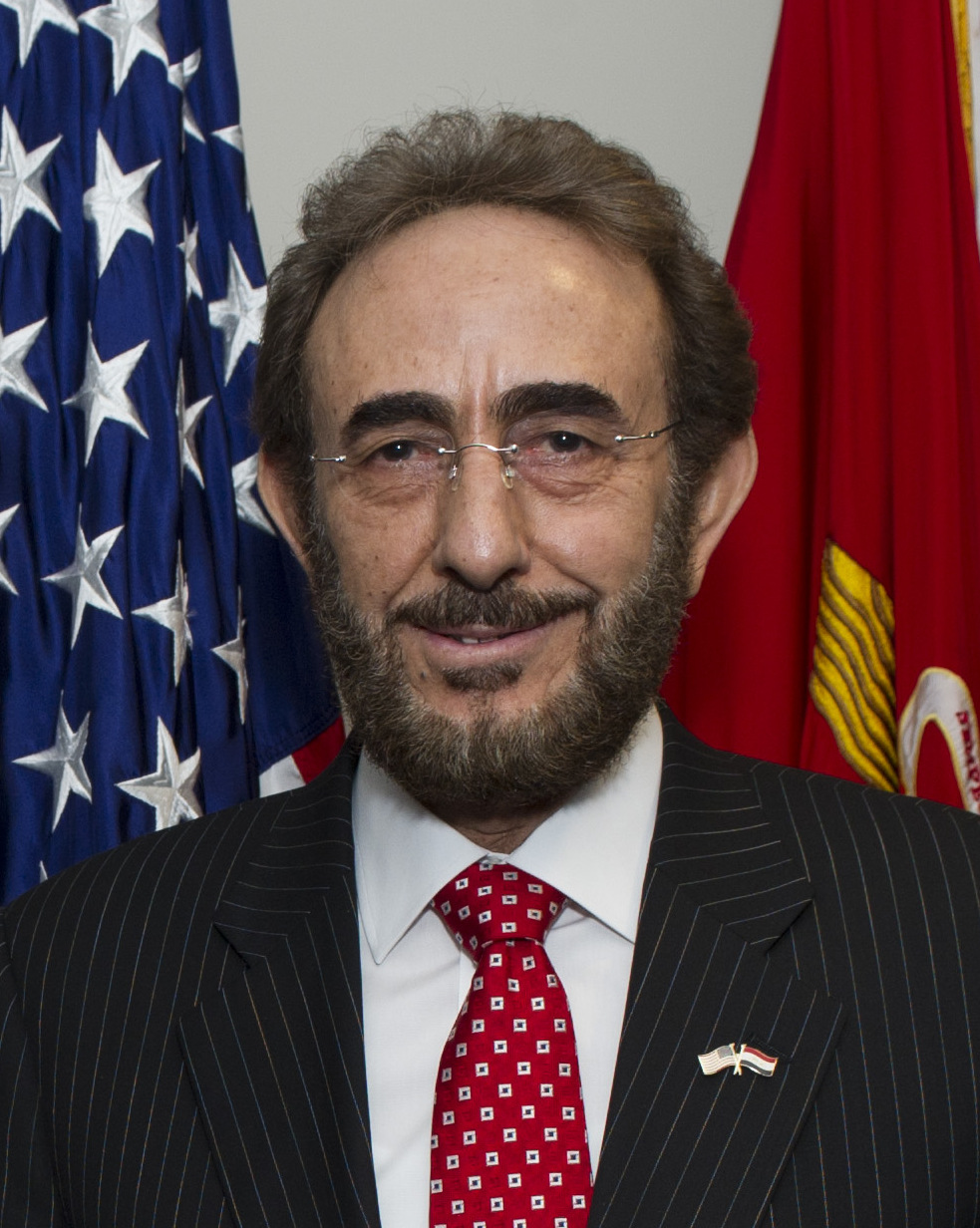
- Saadoun al-Dulaimi at The Pentagon in 2012

Defence Minister of Iraq
- In office 17 August 2011 – 18 October 2014
- President: Jalal Talabani
- Prime Minister: Nouri al-Maliki
- Preceded by: Nouri al-Maliki (acting)
- Succeeded by: Khaled al-Obaidi

Culture Minister of Iraq
- In office 21 December 2010 – Oct 2014
- President: Jalal Talabani
- Prime Minister: Nouri al-Maliki

Defence Minister of Iraq
- In office 1 June 2005 – 6 March 2006
- President: Jalal Talabani
- Prime Minister: Ibrahim al-Jaafari
- Preceded by: Hazim al-Shaalan
- Succeeded by: Qadir Obeidi

Personal details
- Born: 1954 (age 71–72) Ramadi, Al Anbar Governorate, Kingdom of Iraq
- Party: Unity Alliance of Iraq
- Education: University of Baghdad, Keele University
- Profession: Lecturer, Researcher. Psychologist, Statistician

Saadoun al-Dulaimi (Arabic: سعدون الدليمي Saʿadūn ad-Dulaimī) (born 1954) is an Iraqi politician, a current MP, ex-minister of culture, and ex-minister of defence of Iraq for two terms.

== Early life and education ==
Saadoun al-Dulaimi was born in Al-Anbar in 1954. He holds a master's degree in sociology from the University of Baghdad in 1979, and a PhD in social psychology from the United Kingdom in 1990.

== Before the fall of Saddam's regime ==
After obtaining the master's degree, he worked as a teacher at University of Baghdad, then he was sent to London to complete a doctoral degree in 1986. In addition, he worked as a lecturer in British universities, and in many Arab universities, including Saudi Arabia and Jordan. He was also selected as a key member of scientific and academic associations and conducted many types of research in Arabic and English languages.

He joined the Iraqi opposition against the rule of Saddam Hussein after the invasion of Kuwait; and was sentenced to death in absentia, for his participation in a coup attempt. He participated in the opposition conferences abroad and was selected in the Coordination Committee and a follow-up conference in London in 2002.

== Later career ==
Saadoun returned to Iraq in 2003 and established "Iraq Center for Research and Strategic Studies – ICRSS".

He served as minister of defense in the government of Ibrahim al-Jaafari, from 1 June 2005 to 6 March 2006. Then he was named advisor to the Council of Ministers in the government of Nouri al-Maliki from 15 June 2006 to the end of the Government on 20 May 2010.

In the parliamentary elections held on 7 March 2010, Saadoun won on behalf of the Unity Alliance of Iraq in Al Anbar province. He was appointed minister of culture to the government of Nouri al-Maliki, which he sworn on 21 December 2010.

He was appointed the acting minister of defense on 17 August 2011. During his tenure, ISIL forces attacked and gained control of significant portions of Iraqi territory, Including Mosul in June 2014. He was replaced as acting defense minister in December of the same year.

In the parliamentary elections held on 30 April 2014, Saadoun won on behalf of the United Sons of Iraq Alliance.

In the parliamentary elections held on 12 May 2018, Saadoun won on behalf of "Alanbar is Our Identity", securing 6 out of 15 parliamentary seats. His alliance came first in the province of Alanbar

== Allegations ==
Sadoun Al-Dulaimi was named as one of the people responsible for the fall of the Iraqi city of Mosul to advancing ISIS forces in June 2014. Al-Dulaimi was found responsible in a report compiled by the Parliamentary Committee for Security and Defense, a subcommittee of the Iraqi parliament, commissioned by then Prime Minister Haider Al-Abadi. The report blames former Iraq PM and other senior officials for fall of Mosul and names Al-Dulaimi as the third person named after Nouri Al-Maliki and Atheel al-Nujaifi, the governor of Nineveh province at the time.
