= Iraq Awakening and Independents National Alliance =

The Iraq Awakening and Independents National Alliance (List 239) is an Iraqi political coalition formed to contest the 2009 Al Anbar governorate election. It obtained 8 out of 29 seats - the highest of any party list.

The party was formed out of the Awakening movements - Sunni tribal militias armed and financed by the United States Army to fight al-Qaeda in Iraq. The Alliance was led by Sheikh Ahmed Abu Risha, Sheikh Amir Ali al-Sulaiman and Sheikh Hameed al-Hayyes. Abu Risha is the brother of Abdul Sattar Abu Risha who headed the Anbar Salvation Council, the first Awakening Movement to receive American backing.
