= National Movement for Development and Reform =

National Movement for Development and Reform الحركة الوطنية للاصلاح والتنمية
- al-Hal logo
- Leader: Jamal Al-Karboli
- Founded: 2009
- Ideology: liberalism Iraqi nationalism Unitarism
- Political position: Centre-right
- Religion: Sunni Islam
- Seats in the Council of Representatives of Iraq: 4 / 328
- Seats in the local governorate councils: 1 / 440

Website
- www.alhalnews.com

National Movement for Development and Reform (Arabic: الحركة الوطنية للاصلاح والتنمية), more commonly known as Al-Hal or the Solution, is a political party in Iraq. The party is a Sunni-based party.

There are branches in the following governorates: Baghdad, Anbar, Salah ad Din, Diyala, Nineveh, Kirkuk, and Dhi Qar.

Jamal Al-Karboli is the Secretary-General.

In the 2009 Iraqi governorate elections, it won 3 seats in Al Anbar. In the 2010 Iraqi parliamentary election, it joined the Iraqiyya coalition and was allocated 13 of their 91 seats.
