= National Front for the Salvation of Iraq =

National Front for the Salvation of Iraq الجبهة الوطنية لإنقاذ العراق
- Secretary-General: Sheikh Ali Hatem al-Suleiman
- Founded: 2008
- Ideology: Populism
- National affiliation: State of Law Coalition
- Seats in the Council of Representatives of Iraq: 0 / 325
- Seats in the local governorate councils: 0 / 440

The National Front for the Salvation of Iraq is a political party in Iraq. It developed out of the Awakening movements and is mostly made up of Sunni Muslim tribal leaders from Al-Anbar province, an ethnic Arab region.

== History ==
The Awakening Councils had split into three parts by 2008, with Sheikh Hatem forming the National Front for the Salvation of Iraq, and Sheikh Hamid al-Heyes forming the Anbar Salvation Council. The reason for their split from Abu Risha's Anbar Awakening Council was mostly due to Risha's close ties to the Islamist oriented and Iraqi Islamic Party affiliated Independent Gathering.

The Front was founded in 2008 in advance of the Iraqi governorate elections of 2009. Its leader is Sheikh Ali Hatem and it claims the backing of the Al-Anbar Salvation Council, the Al-Anbar Awakening Congress, and the Council of Al-Anbar sheikhs. The party did not run its own candidates for the Iraqi governorate elections of 2009, but instead supported those of the Anbar Salvation Council. In the run up to the Iraqi parliamentary elections of 2010 Hatem chose to align with the State of Law Coalition, believing the coalition represented a cross-sectarian alliance. When rumours began to circulate of a merger between the State of Law Coalition and the Iraqi National Alliance Hatem threatened to leave the State of Law Coalition were such a merger to take place.

== Platform ==
Hatim said their rivals in the Iraqi Accord Front contested the 2005 elections "for the sake of power" whilst Sunni Arabs kept away from elections and the government. He condemned sectarianism, saying they had defended their Shiite brothers that had sought shelter in Al-Anbar both during the Iran–Iraq War and during the "recent events" and their goal was to "crush the sectarian sedition". He said the Iraqi Islamic Party wanted to "steal the people's funds in the name of religion" and they wanted to "cut them down to size". Hatem has at other times claimed he has only entered politics to preserve the influence of his tribe; the Dulaim. At other times he has recognised the institutions of the state, and claimed that for the rule of law Tribal Sheikhs in Anbar must give up their tribal positions of power.
