= Jawad al-Bulani =

Iraqi politician

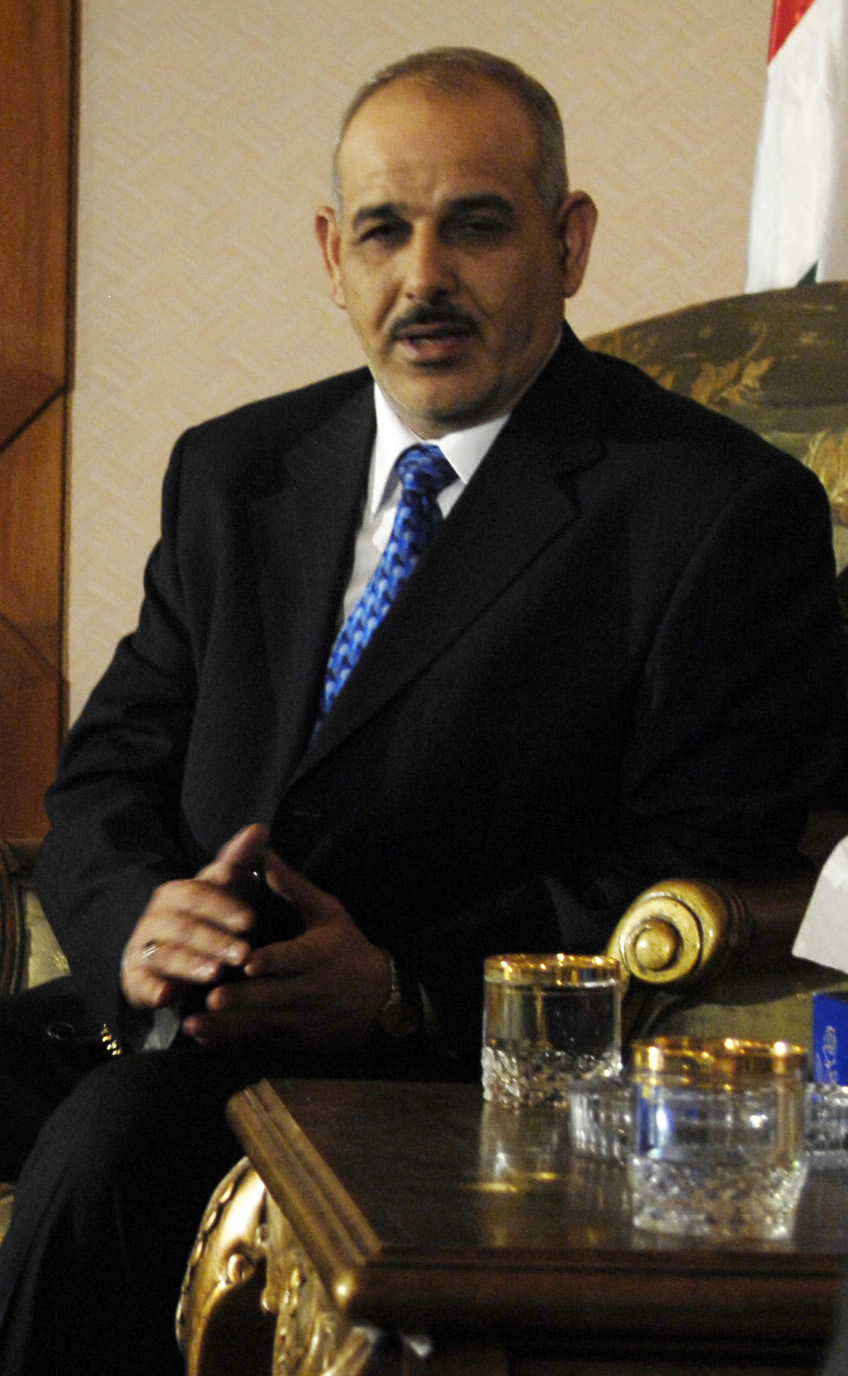
- Jawad al-Bolani, Baghdad, 2007.

Interior Minister of Iraq
- In office 8 June 2006 – 21 December 2010
- President: Jalal Talabani
- Prime Minister: Nouri al-Maliki
- Preceded by: Nouri al-Maliki
- Succeeded by: Nouri al-Maliki

Personal details
- Born: 1960 (age 65–66) Al Diwaniyah, Iraq
- Party: Iraqi Constitutional
- Profession: Air force engineer, politician

Military service
- Allegiance: Iraq
- Branch/service: Iraqi Army

Jawad al-Bulani (Arabic: جواد البولاني) (also spelled Al-Bolani; born in 1960) served as the Interior Minister of Iraq within the Council of Ministers under Iraqi Prime Minister Nouri al-Maliki from 8 June 2006 to 21 December 2010. Bulani is a Shi'a independent member of the United Iraqi Alliance.

Bulani's family is originally from the Diwaniyah region. He grew up in Al-Amarah and graduated with a degree in either mechanical engineering or aeronautical engineering from the Baghdad University of Technology. An Air Force engineer under the government of Saddam Hussein, he left the military in 1999.

Bulani has been a member of several political parties since Coalition forces removed Hussein from power:

- The Sadrist Movement of Muqtada al-Sadr
- The Hizbollah (Iraq) party of Abdel-Karim Mahoud al-Mohammedawi – he served as his deputy when Mohammedawi was a member of the Iraqi Governing Council
- The Islamic Virtue Party, whose General Secretariat he served on
- Ahmed Chalabi's National Congress Coalition and the Iraqi Constitutional Party, which Bulani founded, were linked
- Bulani headed the Shiite Political Council that is allied to Chalabi

He was a member of the committee that drafted the Constitution of Iraq.

Bulani is seen as an independent figure with no militia ties by the U.S. and many in Iraq. However, there have been calls from some within the UIA for him to be sacked due to a lack of improvement in security. Bulani has defended himself by announcing a major security operation to be rolled out in September. He has also vowed to clean up corruption in Interior Ministry forces.

In the 2010 Iraqi Elections he was the leader of the Unity Alliance of Iraq and was their nr. 1 candidate in Baghdad. However, the list performed disappointingly winning only 4 seats nationwide. Jawad al-Bulani himself did not manage to win a seat, getting only 3,972 votes in Baghdad. He was not reappointed to the position of interior minister when the new Council of Ministers was formed in December 2010; the position of interior minister was left vacant, with the result that Prime Minister Nouri al-Maliki held the position of acting interior minister.

One of the list's four MPs, Ali al-Sajri, was appointed a minister of state in Maliki's new government. He therefore resigned his seat and it was awarded as a "replacement seat" to al-Bulani. However, the Federal Supreme Court struck down this appointment, ruling that al-Bulani, who had stood in Baghdad governorate as part of the Constitutional Party element of the list, could not replace Sajri, who had been elected from the Salahuddin governorate as part of the "Peoples' Current" (Tayyar al-Shaab) element.

Political offices
Preceded by Bayan Jabr	Interior minister 2006–2010	Succeeded by Nouri al-Maliki
