= Abdul Sattar Abu Risha =

Iraqi tribal sheikh

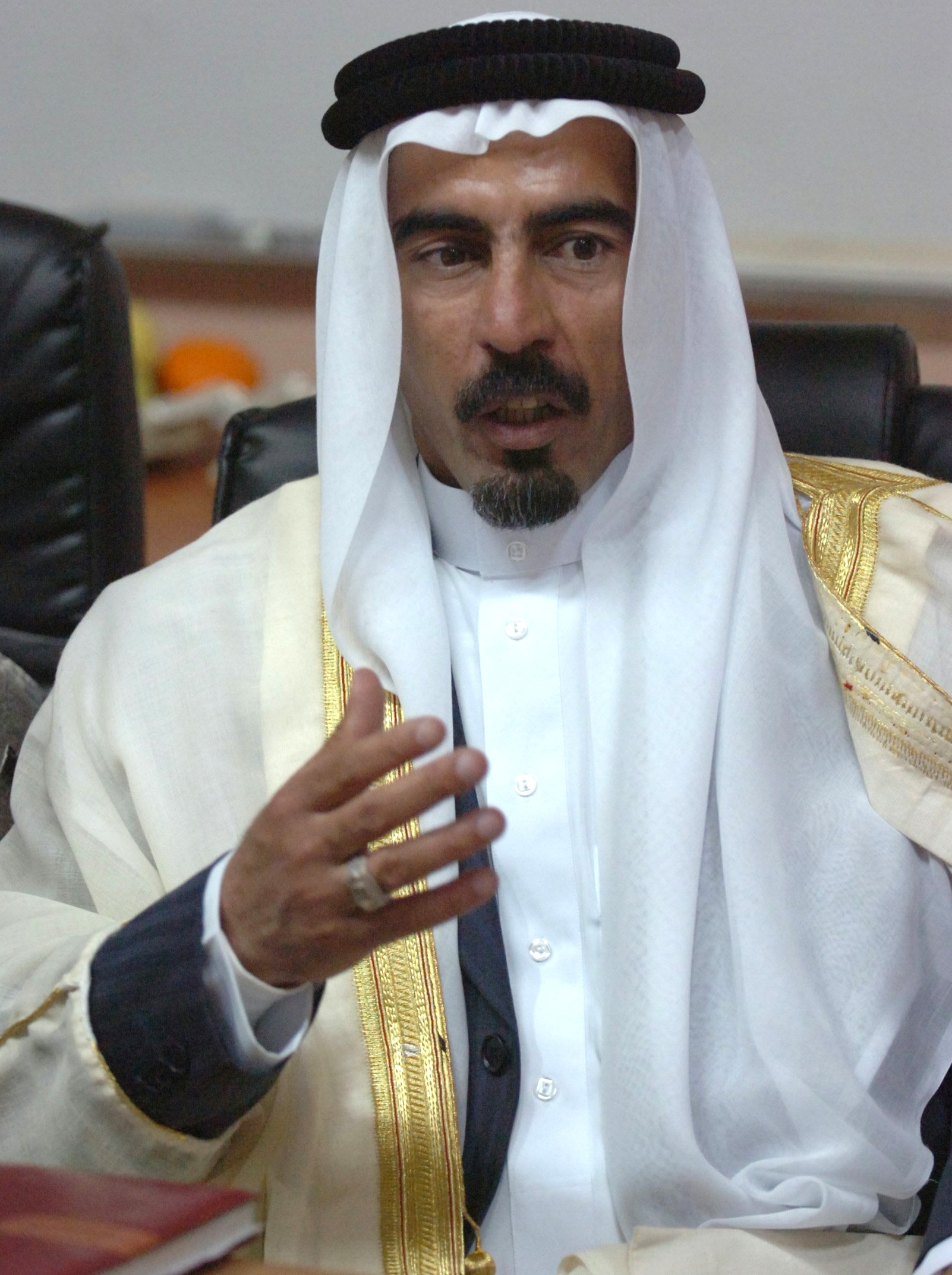
- Born: 1972
- Died: 13 September 2007 (aged 34–35); Ramadi, Iraq
- Cause of death: Assassination
- Other names: Abdul Sattar Buzaigh Hisham al-Rishawi, Sheikh Sittar
- Occupation: Sunni tribal chief in Al-Anbar
- Known for: "Anbar Awakening" – opposing al-Qaeda in Iraq
- Relatives: Ahmed Abu Risha (brother)

Abdul Sattar Abu Risha (Arabic: عبد الستار أبو ريشة) – Sheikh Abdul Sattar Eftikhan al-Rishawi الشيخ عبد الستار افتيخان الريشاوي – (born 1972 – 13 September 2007) was a high-profile Iraqi tribal sheikh of the Abu-Risha tribe. He was the leader of an alliance of Iraqi Sunni Arab tribes that opposed al-Qaeda in Iraq.

Abu Risha was assassinated shortly after becoming an ally of the Iraqi government through forming an organisation of fellow tribal chiefs called the Sahawat al-Anbar (Anbar Awakening), based in Anbar's provincial capital of Ramadi, some 70 miles (110 km) west of Baghdad.

== Life ==
Abu Risha was the grandson of a tribal leader in the 1920 Iraqi Revolt and the son of an officer who served in the Anglo-Iraqi War in 1941. Little is known about Abu Risha's life prior to the Iraq War, albeit he reportedly ran a construction and import-export business with offices in Amman in Jordan and Dubai in the United Arab Emirates. According to The Washington Post, "he was called a warlord and a highway bandit, an oil smuggler and an opportunist". Many of the Awakening leaders are believed to have at least tacitly supported the Iraqi insurgency, though Sattar claimed he never did.

During the early part of the insurgency following the 2003 invasion of Iraq, as al-Qaeda's fighters tightened their grip on Ramadi, it is reported that they became increasingly repressive and challenged the tribal leaders' power. Soon they were kidnapping and beheading tribal Sunnis as part of a campaign of extortion and intimidation. Abdul Sattar's own father and two brothers were killed by al-Qaeda. During the late summer of 2006, he began enlisting his fellow sheikhs in Sahawat al-Anbar and encouraging members of his tribe to join the local police force. The U.S. forces under Lt. Col. Tony Deane encouraged Sattar and provided security for the initial meetings of the Al Anbar tribal meetings at Sattar's compound in western Ramadi; these early meetings were the beginning of what grew into the Anbar Salvation Council by the fall of 2006; in March 2007 the Council counted 41 clans from Anbar province. The development led to a sharp reduction of violence in the province and forced many al-Qaeda fighters to flee to other regions of Iraq.

== Assassination ==
Abu Risha was assassinated on 13 September 2007, along with three of his guards by an improvised explosive device planted on the road near the gate of his house in Ramadi. The Islamic State of Iraq took responsibility for the attack and several dozen people were arrested in connection with the killing, including the head of his own security detail.

The sheikh's funeral attracted about 1,500 mourners, including Iraq's national security adviser Mowaffak al-Rubaie, Interior Minister Jawad Jawad Bulani, Defense Minister General Qadir Obeidi and Lieutenant-General Raymond Odierno, second in command of U.S. forces in Iraq, and sparked vows of revenge. After Abu Risha's death, his brother, Sheik Ahmed Abu Risha, was selected to take over leadership of the Anbar Salvation Council by the tribal leaders of the province.

== See also ==
- Al-Qaeda in Iraq
- Sons of Iraq
