= 2020 Kurdish protests in Sulaymaniyah Governorate =

2020 kurdish protests in Sulaymaniyah Governorate
- Part of the 2019–2021 Iraqi protests
- Location of the Sulaymaniyah Governorate (red)
- Date: 2 December 2020 – 11 December 2020 (1 week and 2 days)
- Location: Sulaymaniyah Governorate, Kurdistan Region
- Caused by: Corruption; Nepotism; Unemployment; Social injustice
- Goals: Political reforms
- Methods: Demonstrations, Riots; Civil disobedience

Parties
Protesters	Patriotic Union of Kurdistan; PUK Security Forces

Casualties
- Deaths: 10
- Injuries: +65

The 2020 Kurdish protests were a series of demonstrations and riots against the Kurdistan Regional Government in Sulaymaniyah Governorate in Iraqi Kurdistan. The demonstrations started on 2 December 2020. Demonstrators took to the streets to demonstrate against the political leadership, high unemployment rate, lack of public services and infeasible wages. Certain demonstrators set fire to several government buildings and the headquarters of political parties during the protests, which resulted in harsh crackdowns from PUK security forces.

== Timeline ==
=== December 2020 ===
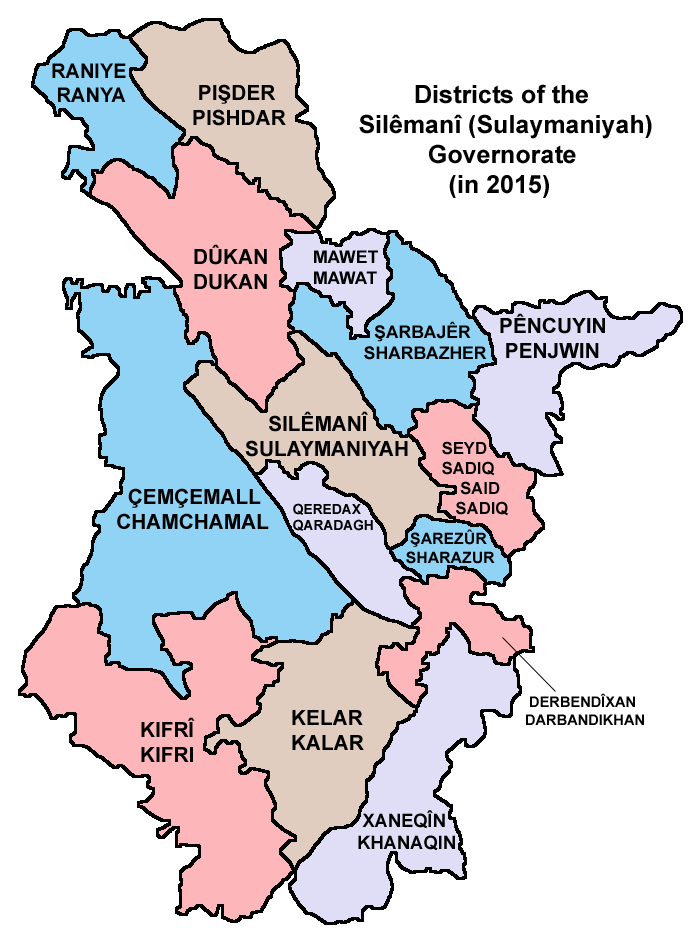
Districts of the Sulaymaniyah Governorate

- 2 December :In Sulaymaniyah city are many teachers and employees who went out in the streets because they didn't get their salary for a few months from the Kurdistan Regional Government
- 5 December: In Piramagrun, a small town located north west of Sulaymaniyah, protestors blocked the road from Piramagrun to Sulaymaniyah.
- 6 December: In Piramagrun the demonstrators invaded the Patriotic Union of Kurdistan building and set fire in the building. The demonstrators wanted to invade the Kurdistan Democratic Party building, but the invasion failed to control the building. In Bazyan, a small town west of Sulaymaniyah, protesters blocked the major road connecting Sulaymaniyah and Kirkuk.
- 7 December: The PUK security forces raided NRT's headquarters channel and closed it because it was airing the protests. In Said Sadiq, a town located southeast of Sulaymaniyah, demonstrators set fire to the local government building, electricity directorate, and several parties offices. In Chamchamal, a small city located west of Sulaymaniyah, one protester was killed and three others were injured. Also in Chamchamal and Takiya, protesters blocked the major road connecting Sulaymaniyah and Kirkuk. In Kifri, a small city located southwest of Sulaymaniyah, one protester was killed after clashes between protesters and members of the Patriotic Union of Kurdistan. In Darbandikhan, a small city located south of Sulaymaniyah, one protester was killed.
- 8 December: Demonstrations were continued in Chamchamal, Ranya, Penjwen, Kalar, Kifri, Bazian, Takiya, Darbandikhan, Arbat, Dukan, Khurmal, Halabja Taza, Hajiawa, and Shaharzur. In Takiya, a small town located west of Sulaymaniyah, one protester was killed, and five other protesters were injured. In Said Sadiq 2 protesters was killed and 14 protestors was injured after strong clashes between protesters and PUK security forces. In Penjwen is a small city located east of Sulaymaniyah near Iraqi Kurdistan border with Iran, one member of Kurdistan Democratic Party was killed after clashes between protestors and members of Kurdistan Democratic Party. In Sharazoor is a small city located south of Sulaymaniyah, protesters set on fire Sharazur Education Directorate, the traffic police station and the mayor's house.
- 9 December: The PUK security forces imposed on curfew 48 hours in Sulaymaniyah Governorate but demonstrators broke the curfew and continued to protests against the government . In Arbat is a small town located south of Sulaymaniyah, many people got out in street to protest against government, as well as one protester was killed during clashes between protesters and PUK security forces. In Piramagrun, protesters set on fire the traffic police station. In Chamchamal, protesters set fire to the Gorran Movement building. In Dukan is a small city located north of Sulaymaniyah, one Peshmerga died of a stroke while trying to disperse protesters blocking the Dukan-Sulaimani road.
- 10 December: Protesters angry over deteriorating economic conditions, public sector salary cuts and delays, and unemployment resumed their demonstrations in parts of Sulaimani governorate on Thursday (December 10), while bans on travel between towns and unauthorized protests remained in force. Protests were reported in Ranya, Qaladze, and Kifri amid heavy deployments of the security forces, who were trying to disperse demonstrators. Head of Shahid Khalid Hospital, Saman Ahmed, told reporters that one protester was killed in Kifri, bringing the death toll to nine. Another demonstrator was severely injured in the city and was later transferred to a hospital in Kalar.
- 11 December: The demonstrations continued in several cities in Sulaymaniyah Governorate and clashes had happened between demonstrators and PUK security forces in Sulaymaniyah, the police arrested many demonstrators. Also, the PUK security forces arrested two journalists from Al Iraqiya TV channel and one journalist from NRT TV channel while covering the demonstration in the Sulaymaniyah city and the two Al Iraqiya TV channel journalists were released later the same day after spending some hours in custody.
- 12 December: There were no protests in Sulaymaniyah Governorate, and the situation was quiet in the governorate. PUK security forces released the NRT TV channel journalist Karzan Tarik after spending 24 hours in custody.

== See also ==
- 1991 uprising in Sulaymaniyah
- 2011 Dohuk riots
- 2011–2012 Kurdish protests in Turkey
- List of protests in the 21st century
- 2011 Kurdish protests in Iraq
- 2020 storming of the Kurdistan Democratic Party Headquarter
