= Iraq protests =

Iraq protests may refer to:

- 1999 Shia uprising in Iraq, short period of unrest in Iraq in early 1999 following the killing of Mohammad Mohammad Sadeq al-Sadr by the then Ba'athist government of Iraq.
- 2011 Kurdish protests in Iraq, were a series of demonstrations and riots against the Kurdistan Regional Government in northern Iraq.
- 2011 Iraqi protests, Part of the Arab Spring, came in the wake of the Tunisian revolution and 2011 Egyptian revolution.
- 2012–13 Iraqi protests, started on 21 December 2012 following a raid on the home of Sunni Finance Minister Rafi al-Issawi and the arrest of 10 of his bodyguards.
- 2015–2018 Iraqi protests, over deteriorating economic conditions and state corruption started on 16 July 2015 in Baghdad.
- 2019 Iraqi protests also called October Revolution, Part of the Arab protests (2018–present), ongoing series of protests started on 1 October 2019.
- Protests against the Iraq War, after the 2003 invasion of Iraq, large-scale protests against the Iraq War were held in many cities worldwide, often coordinated to occur simultaneously around the world.
- 15 February 2003 anti-Iraq-war protests, On 15 February 2003, a coordinated day of protests started across the world in which people in more than 600 cities expressed opposition to the imminent Iraq War.
