= 2011 Kurdish protests =

2011 Kurdish protests may refer to demonstrations by the Kurdish minority in a number of countries, concurrent with and inspired by the Arab Spring in early 2011:

- 2011 Kurdish protests in Iraq, which took place in northern Iraq against the Kurdish Regional Government.
- 2011–2012 Kurdish protests in Turkey, which have seen Kurds in Turkey clash with the government over perceived discrimination and demands for regional autonomy.
- 2011 Syrian uprising, which has involved Kurds in Syria demonstrating for greater cultural rights and civil liberties.
- 2011 Iranian protests, which witnessed demonstrations against the government by Kurds in Iran, especially in traditionally Kurdish regions.
