= Halabjay Taza =

Town in Sulaymaniyah Governorate, Kurdistan Region, Iraq

Halabjay Taza ھەڵەبجەی تازە
- Town
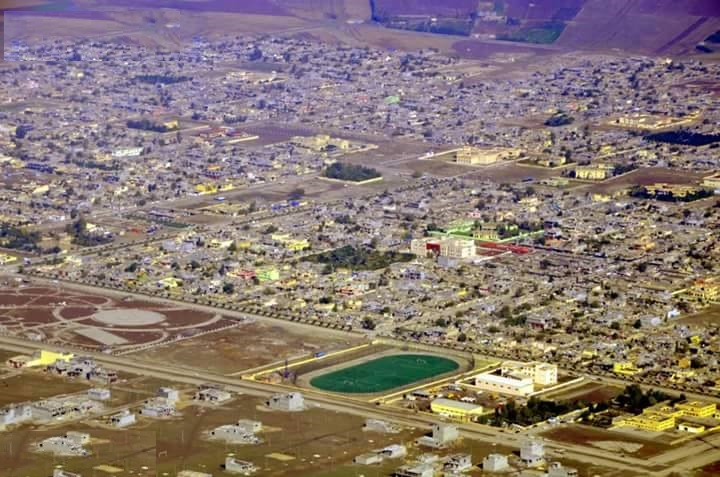
- Image of the town
- Interactive map of Halabjay Taza
- Location within Iraq Halabjay Taza (Iraqi Kurdistan)
- Coordinates: 35.32021°N 45.6834°E
- Country: Iraq
- Region: Kurdistan Region
- Governorate: Sulaymaniyah Governorate
- District: Sharazoor District
- Subdistrict: Halabjay Taza Subdistrict
- Built: 1989
- Former name: Saddam's Halabja

Population (2026)
  - Total: 52,478

Halabjay Taza (Kurdish: هەڵەبجەی تازە, romanized: Helebcey Taze, lit. 'New Halabja'), also known as Halabja Taza or Sharazoor and formerly known as Saddam's Halabja, is a town in the Sulaymaniyah Governorate of Kurdistan Region, Iraq. The town serves as the administrative centre of Sharazur District. The population of the town is 52,478 people. It was built in 1989 by Ba’athist Iraq as a replacement for Halabja, which was destroyed in a chemical attack. The regime had officially named the town “Saddam’s Halabja”, however, the local Kurds defiantly called it “Halabjay Taza”.

== History ==
=== Construction of the town ===
One year after the 1988 chemical attack, Ali Hassan al-Majid ordered the construction of Halabjay Taza. The town was built near Zarayan and was 50 kilometers northwest of Halabja. The town was initially set up in 1989 as a collection of sheds with tarp roofs. Most of the residents were brought to Halabja Taza in trucks after their villages and towns were destroyed. The regime called the town Saddam's Halabja, however, the locals called the town Halabjay Taza.

Halabjay Taza, in contrast to Halabja, lacked everything that the old Halabja had: there were no trees, no mountains, and the weather was warm. The town was just a forced collective town designed to uproot people from Halabja, Byara, and the other towns and villages so that they would stop supporting the Peshmerga in rural areas.

The neighborhoods of the town were given by the original homes of the residents: Halabja, Sirwan, Byara, Khurmal, Tawila, and Shameran, and all of these areas were designated by the Ba’athist regime as forbidden places.

Two years after the creation of the town, and at the end of the Persian Gulf War when Kurds gained autonomy, the town’s name had officially changed from “Saddam’s Halabja” to “Halabjay Taza”.

=== The Three Hills of Halabjay Taza ===
When bulldozers began leveling three hills near Halabjay Taza, Abdul Raqeeb Yousif, a local in the town, wrote to Mu’ayyid Saeed, the Director General of Antiquities of Iraq, to stop the destruction of what he considered cultural heritage. Mu’ayyid Saeed supported Yousif's request and referred it to higher authorities in the government. After several days, all bulldozers and excavators stopped levelling the three hills. The hills still stand today.

=== 2020 Sulaymaniyah Governorate Protests ===
In 2020, mass protests occurred across Sulaymaniyah Governorate, which happened due to unpaid salaries and unemployment. The security forces suppressed crowds using tear gas and water cannons. Protests also occurred in Sharazoor District, including the towns of Halabjay Taza and Zarayan. People burned down the Sharazoor Education Directorate, the Traffic Police Station, and the mayor’s house. The headquarters of several political parties, such as KDP and PUK, were also targeted.

== See also ==
- Sharazoor District
- Sulaymaniyah Governorate
- Halabja
