= Ahmad Muhammad Saeed al-Atrushi =

Iraqi politician

General-Secretary of the Pro-Iraqi Wing of the Kurdistan Democratic Party
- In office 1989–2003
- Preceded by: Hashim Aqrawi
- Constituency: Duhok Governorate

Member of the National Assembly of Iraq
- In office 2000–2003
- President: Saddam Hussein
- Constituency: Duhok Governorate

Personal details
- Born: 1947 (age 78–79) Atrush, Duhok Governorate, Iraq
- Party: Kurdistan Democratic Party (Pro-Iraqi Wing)
- Other party: National Progressive Front

Ahmad Muhammad Saeed al-Atrushi (born 1947 in Atrush, Duhok, Iraq) is a former Kurdish politician in Iraq. Until 2003 he was general-secretary of the left, anti-Barzani, pro-Iraqi wing of the Kurdistan Democratic Party (KDP). He followed Hashim Aqrawi, who had split up that KDP wing and joined the Baath-led National Progressive Front. In 2000 president Saddam Hussein appointed al-Atrushi for the constituency of Dohuk in the fifth legislative term of the National Assembly.

== Sources ==
- Kurdish Observer from 15 November 2001: SADDAM COMMENTS TO KURD COLLABORATOR GROUP
- National Assembly of the Republic of Iraq: The Fifth National Assembly
- National Assembly of the Republic of Iraq: Parliamentarians
- Los Angeles Times from 3 July 1989, page 12: Iraq Kurd Party Election
