= Hashim Aqrawi =

Hashim Hasan Aqrawi
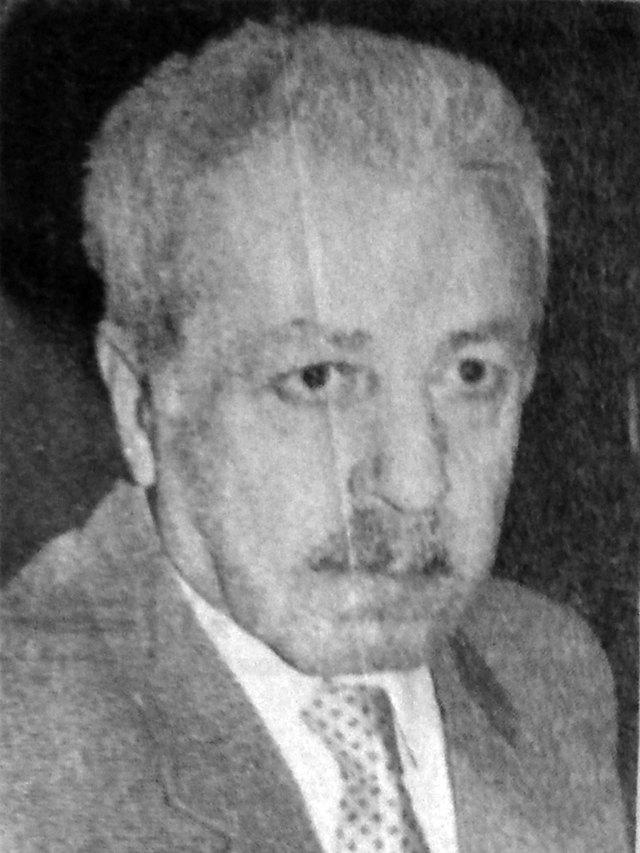
- Hashim Hasan Aqrawi (1988)

Head of the Executive Council
- In office 1974–1980
- Succeeded by: Ahmad Muhammad Saeed al-Atrushi

Minister in the Iraqi central government
- Incumbent
- Assumed office 1974

Personal details
- Born: 1926 Aqrah, Iraq
- Died: 1990 (aged 63–64)
- Party: Kurdistan Democratic Party (KDP)
- Other party: National Progressive Front

Hashim Hasan rashid 'Aqrawi (1926–1990) was a Kurdish politician in Iraq.

Aqrawi was born in Aqrah, Iraq in 1926. In 1951 Aqrawi joined the Kurdistan Democratic Party (KDP) and became a member of its Central Committee in 1960 as well as a member of the party's politburo in 1964. Following negotiations between the Iraqi Baath regime and the Kurds about autonomy he became director of Dohuk Governorate in 1970 and Babil Governorate in 1974. Following an intermezzo as minister in the Iraqi central government in 1974 he became a member of the legislative council (regional parliament) and head of the executive council (regional government) of the new established Kurdish autonomous region in Northern Iraq.

When the KDP split over the autonomy agreement Aqrawi became a Central Committee's secretary of the party's left, anti-Barzani, pro-Iraqi wing which had joined the Baath-led National Progressive Front. Finally, in 1980, he became general-secretary of that KDP wing. In 1989, Aqrawi was succeeded by Ahmad Muhammad Saeed al-Atrushi, when it was reported that he was in failing health. He died in 1990.

== Sources ==
- Sabih M. Shukri (ed.): The International WHO'S WHO of the Arab World, page 61. London 1984
- Erhard Franz: Kurden und Kurdentum - Zeitgeschichte eines Volkes und seiner Nationalbewegungen, page 103. Mitteilungen 30, Deutsches Orient-Institut Hamburg 1986
- Los Angeles Times from 3 July 1989, page 12: Iraq Kurd Party Election
