= 2011 Kurdish protests in Iraq =

Demonstrations and riots in Iraqi Kurdistan

- Part of the 2011 Iraqi protests
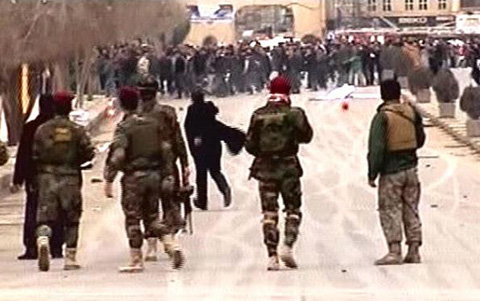
- Security guards in front of the headquarter of Kurdistan Democratic Party responded by shooting into the crowd.
- Date: 17 February – 30 April 2011 (2 months, 1 week and 6 days)
- Location: Iraqi Kurdistan
- Caused by: Corruption, Nepotism, Arab Spring, Social injustice
- Goals: Greater autonomy; Political reforms
- Methods: Demonstrations, Riots

Parties
(Kurdistan Region) Kurdish protesters Opposition parties; Movement for Change; Kurdistan Islamic Union; Kurdistan Justice Group	(Kurdistan Region) Government of Kurdistan; Kurdistan Democratic Party; Patriotic Union of Kurdistan

The 2011 Kurdish protests in Iraq (Sorani Kurdish: خۆپیشاندانی ١٧ی شوباتی ٢٠١١) were a series of demonstrations and riots against the Kurdistan Regional Government in Iraqi Kurdistan. The autonomous region experienced protests that were concurrent with the 2011 Iraqi protests and the wider Arab Spring. The Iraqi Kurdish protests were also related to the 2011 Kurdish protests in Turkey and the 2011–2012 Iranian protests, as well as the civil uprising phase of the Syrian Civil War.

== Background ==
Inspired by the Arab Spring, the Movement for Change, a major opposition party, called for the resignation of the Cabinet and the disbanding of the Kurdistan Regional Government. The movement was criticized by ruling and opposition parties for causing unnecessary unrest. Qubad Talabani said that there was no need for the government to disband because "unlike Tunisia and Egypt, there is an open political process with a viable opposition in Kurdistan." Despite this criticism, the Movement for Change continued to organise demonstrations.

== Protests ==
=== Sulaymaniyah ===
Protests erupted in the autonomous region of Iraqi Kurdistan, mainly in the city of Sulaimaniya where a crowd of 3000 protesters gathered against corruption and social injustice. The demonstrations turned violent when a group of protesters tried to storm the headquarters of the Kurdistan Democratic Party and threw rocks at the building. The security guards responded by shooting into the crowd several times to disperse them, during the protest Rezhwan Haji Ali was killed and 57 were wounded. The Movement for Change took responsibility for the demonstrations but said it had nothing to do with the storming of the building and condemned the attack on the headquarters.

In the following weeks the demonstration expanded and reached a height of 7000 protesters. A sit-in demonstration was held and demonstrators occupied the Freedom Square (Saray Azadi in Kurdish) in Sulaymaniyah. About 400 protesters gathered in Sulaimaniya's central square, but at least 50 were hurt when some demonstrators allegedly began to attack police with sticks and stones, leading to a riot. Religious leaders and other opposition parties joined the protesters Security forces clashed with protesters several times and both sides took casualties resulting in the dead of ten people

=== Crackdown ===
On 19 April security forces stormed the main square of Sulaimaniya to impose order and prevent further demonstrations. Security forces were successful in quelling demonstrations. Security forced were deployed all around the province making for an uneasy peace between authorities and civilians.

=== Parliament ===
The opposition called for a motion of no confidence against the cabinet of prime minister Barham Salih. The motion was rejected with 67 to 28. The opposition said it didn't expect the motion to pass but that it wanted to give a symbolic gesture. Barham Salih responded by saying that the debate "offered opportunity to present achievements, challenges& agenda for expanding reforms. [We] Must listen to voices of people."

== Reaction ==
- Massoud Barzani: After a week of protests the Kurdistan Regional President Massoud Barzani responded to the protesters saying everyone has the right to protest as long as it is peaceful.
- Jalal Talabani: The Iraqi President, whose party relies on the city of Sulaymaniyah for support, said in an interview that the "crowd's demands are inspirational and legitimate".
- Amnesty International: Amnesty International called for an end to the crackdown saying: "Iraqi authorities must end the use of intimidation and violence against those Iraqis peacefully calling for political and economic reforms".
- Human Rights Watch: HRW criticized the authorities saying: "In a time when the Middle East is erupting in demands to end repression, the Kurdish authorities are trying to stifle and intimidate critical journalism. "

== Regional connections ==
Kurdish protesters in Iraqi Kurdistan have expressed solidarity with brethren in Syria and Turkey, and the relative autonomy of the region has helped it to function as a sort of sanctuary for Kurdish leaders and refugees. After the independence of South Sudan in East Africa, some Iraqi Kurds suggested that the example of the South Sudanese peacefully and democratically gaining independence from Arab-dominated Sudan should be a model for the Kurdish population in the Middle East.

== See also ==
- Battle of Sulaymaniyah
- 2011 Dohuk riots
- 2011–2012 Kurdish protests in Turkey
- List of protests in the 21st century
- 2020 Kurdish protests in Sulaymaniyah Governorate
