= 2015–2018 Iraqi protests =

Protests starting in July 2015

- Part of Second Arab Spring
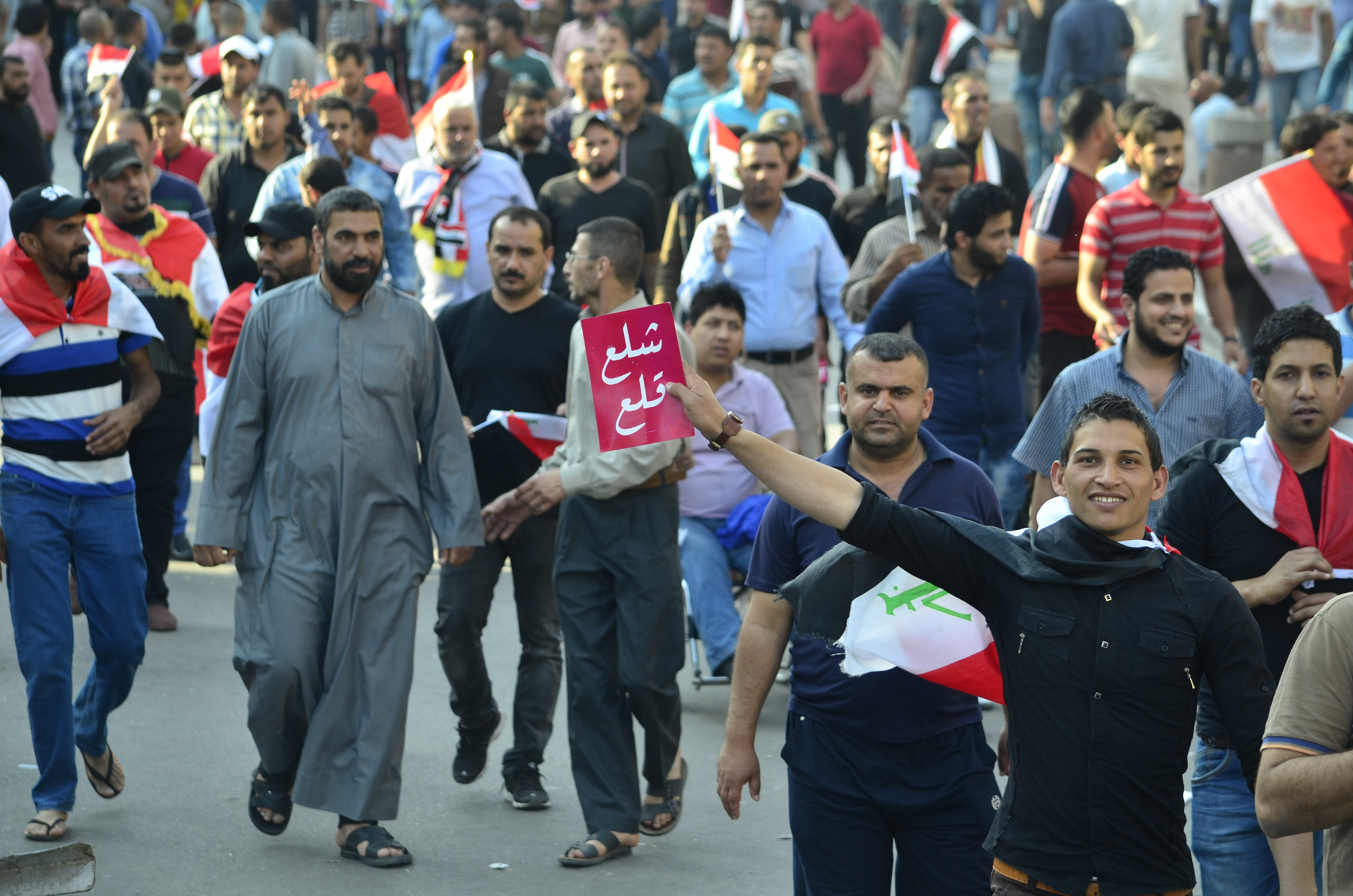
- Scenes from the streets of Iraq during demonstrations across the country, 11 March 2016
- Date: July 2015 – December 2018 (3 years and 5 months)
- Location: Iraq
- Caused by: Unemployment; Poor basic services, like: Lack of fresh water, Lack of reliable electricity; State corruption; Muhasasa quota agreements; Iranian infiltration; Oil companies making large profits in Iraq while Iraqis stayed poor
- Goals: Competent and non-corrupt government
- Methods: Political demonstrations; Civilian sit-in; Occupation of Parliament building; Rampaging Parliament building; Rockets fired at governmental district of Baghdad; Attacking, torching governmental offices; Storming, torching an Iranian consulate; Attacking, torching political party's offices; Attacking, torching militia's offices; Road blocks; Storming and blocking Al Najaf International Airport; Boycott of elections; Islamic sermon during Friday prayers; Friday prayer held in a Baghdad main street; Marching from Islamic holy shrine in Karbala to provincial governor's office; Burning a poster of Iranian Ayatollah Khomeini in a main street; Burning a picture of Iranian supreme leader Ali Khamenei; Rebelling Members of Parliament's sit-in
- Status: Continued in October 2019

As sequel to protests in 2011, 2012 and 2013, Iraqi citizens have also in 2015 up until 2018 often and massively protested against the corruption and incompetence in their government which according to analysts and protesters had led to long-running problems in electricity supplies, clean water availability, Iranian interference in Iraqi politics, high unemployment, and a stagnant economy.

The muhasasa quota agreements of 2003–2006 (distributing ministerial positions including budgets over 'ethnic and religious groups', thus undermining and obliterating any sense of Iraqi national unity) were considered the root of most of those Iraqi problems.

== Background ==
=== Twelve years incompetent and corrupt politics ===
The elite cartel and muhasasa system, ruling Iraq since 2003, holding that governmental posts and power should be proportionally distributed over the political parties or over the "ethnic, religious and sectarian groups" of Iraq, had, according to many analysts and protesters, led to twelve years of incompetent government up to 2015, failing public services, neglected infrastructure, massive youth unemployment (30% in 2014), political patronage and self-enrichment of politicians hence corruption hence a depleted public purse, Iranian political infiltration, sectarian violence, economic underdevelopment, and had therefore already for years drawn widespread popular criticism.

In 2011, demonstrations against the corruption of the government under then-ruling prime minister Nouri al-Maliki (2006–2014) had been suppressed by detainment and intimidation of the organizers. His successor, Prime Minister Haider al-Abadi, had taken office in 2014 with promises of tough action against corrupt practices, and indeed the graft had become less open but the mechanisms of corruption were still in place.

=== Long-running problems ===
The most obvious failure – blamed by analysts and protesters on the muhasasa system (see above) – was the government's inability to reliably provide electricity, which was commonly provided only twelve hours a day but often in the cities only a few hours per day.

Another long-running problem triggering the Iraqi protests in 2015, 2016, 2017 and 2018, especially in Basra, a city in the centre of the southern Iraqi oil industry but with a relatively low socio-economic development and living standard, was the shortage of fresh drinking water, due to five factors:

- Upstream dams in the rivers Tigris and Euphrates or their contributory rivers in Turkey, Syria and Iran had diminished those rivers on Iraqi territory; for the city of Basra and surroundings, new dams around 2009 in the Iranian river Karun had been especially disastrous;
- Citizens accused Iran of throwing saline drainage in the Shatt al-Arab river, the Iraqi river into which the Iranian river Karun empties; similarly, Iraqi officials have stated that Iran at times pumped contaminated water, left over from its farmlands, towards Iraqi territory;
- Streams and canals in southern Iraq had become clogged with trash being dumped;
- Iraq's infrastructure generally was crumbling; specifically, the neglect of Iraq's water management had allowed saltwater from the Persian Gulf to leak into southern Iraqi farmland and freshwater canals;
- The rainfall in Iraq was decreasing as an effect of the global climate change.

== 2015: Protests and reform resolutions ==
All the years of smouldering discontent (see above) escalated in the summer of 2015 into public street protests when a lasting decline in oil prices (oil generating 96% of the state's income) and a strong increase of military expenditures (due to the war on ISIL) strongly affected the state's ability to satisfy the needs and demands of the people.

In July 2015, protests sparked in Basra, triggered mainly by the poor electricity supplies (see above). During the protest on 16 July, a man was killed in a clash with police. On another protest on 19 or 20 July in Basra, again "violence erupted". Those protests spread to more cities.

On Friday 31 July 2015, hundreds protested in capital Baghdad over the enduring problem of electricity power outages, which they blamed on government corruption. On Saturday, 1 August, another protest was held in Basra, in front of the provincial governor's office, over frequent electricity blackouts and salty tap water (see above, section 'Long-running problems'). The same day, a large crowd in the Shia Islamic holy city of Karbala marched from the vicinity of the holy Imam Husayn Shrine to the provincial governor's office, protesting the electricity blackouts, chanting: "You are stealing from us in the name of religion", and saying: "Those people have high salaries and electricity 24 hours a day." On 2 August, in Nasiriyah and Najaf, hundreds protested over electricity and corruption, and in Hillah a thousand people protested over poor public services.

On Friday 7 August 2015, several thousand protested at Baghdad's Tahrir Square, carrying Iraqi flags, chanting: "All of you together to the court, all of you are thieves". In contrast to the demonstration of 31 July which had been organized by secular groups, the one on 7 August was backed by "the powerful Shiite factions", and by Grand Ayatollah Ali al-Sistani who was (and is) regarded as the voice of Shiite moderation, revered by millions of Iraqis, and Iraq's "supreme religious authority". In a sermon during the Friday prayers delivered by his aide and spokesman Ahmed al-Safi in Karbala, ahead of the demonstration that day, al-Sistani stated that Prime Minister Abadi needed to be "more daring and braver in his reforms" combatting the corruption in his government: Abadi "should make the political parties accountable and identify who is hampering the march of reform, whoever they are", Mr al-Safi added. Similar protests were held that day in Shiite cities like Basra, Najaf, Nasiriyah and Karbala.

Two days later already, on 9 August, Abadi released a first package of reforms, including the abolition of a great number of non-essential government posts responsible for vast expenditures. On 11 August, the Iraqi parliament, pressured by the mass protests and the appeals from Grand Ayatollah Ali al-Sistani, unanimously approved Abadi's reforms, and also announced their own plan to replace the system of awarding governmental positions to party loyals with professional recruitment criteria. On 16 August 2015, Abadi issued a second package of reforms, considerably reducing the number of ministries. After August 2015, weekly protests over perceived corruption and mismanagement and Baghdad's failure to provide basic services such as electricity held on, peacefully, into the next year.

== 2016 ==
=== Developments up to early 2016 ===
When Prime Minister Haider al-Abadi came to power in 2014, he had promised to stamp out corruption (see above, section ‘Background’). In 2015, he had set out a reform plan to create a sense of political unity, to improve the failing economy, and to cut off the political and financial corruption. Iraq's system of sharing government positions among political parties, which often resulted in unqualified ministers and other officials, had often been criticized for encouraging such corruption. Therefore, Abadi in February 2016 had proposed a fundamental change to the cabinet, replacing the party-affiliated ministers with non-partisan "professional and technocratic figures and academics".

=== Civilian sit-in, pressing for new cabinet ===
Weekly protests over financial and administrative corruption and the lack of basic services were still going on, since August 2015 (see above). The Shia cleric Muqtada al-Sadr, also leader of the second largest party in parliament, around 17 March 2016 backed these protesters, and asked his followers to start a sit-in on 18 March at the gates of the Green Zone in Baghdad where the parliament is based. So, on Friday, 18 March, thousands of Sadr-supporters held their Friday prayers in a main street near the Green Zone in Baghdad and then set up tents for a sit-in, to pressure the parliament to agree with PM Abadi's plan for replacing party-affiliated cabinet ministers with non-partisan people. In his call on 17 March, Sadr had branded the Green Zone "a bastion of support for corruption" but also asked his followers to refrain from violence should they be stopped by security forces. Riot police initially blocked the protesters but then relented and let them march almost to the entrance of the Zone. Waving Iraqi flags, the protesters chanted: "Yes, yes, to Iraq; no, no, to corruption!"

Around 26 March 2016, Muqtada al-Sadr also started his own sit-in, inside the Green Zone, urging Prime Minister Haider al-Abadi to do what he had announced in February: install a "government of independent technocrats" free of influence from "the political blocks" within parliament. On 31 March, those "blocks" gave in and agreed to pass Abadi's new cabinet within ten days. Sadr ended his sit-in and asked his followers to end theirs. Within two weeks, however, the "heads" of those "political blocks" in parliament changed their minds and between them again agreed to maintain "the political power-sharing agreement and deepen the influence of the political blocks over top government posts and decisions".

=== Parliament blocks renewal of cabinet ===
On 13 April 2016, the speaker of Parliament, Salim al-Jabouri, ended a parliamentary session before parliament could vote on Prime Minister Abadi's proposed new cabinet list. That incited more than 170 MPs (in a parliament counting only 329 seats) to rebel against speaker Jabouri and begin a sit-in inside the parliament, chanting against "the power-sharing agreement" and "the heads of political blocks". (Another source counted "more than 100 MPs" holding that sit-in.)

"Days of chaos" in parliament followed, the sit-in-rebelling MPs on 14 April "voted to dismiss speaker al-Jabouri", in presumably a procedurally invalid voting. On 18 April 2016, again thousands of Muqtada al-Sadr followers protested in Baghdad for reforms. For three weeks, up to 26 April, in which parliament repeatedly failed to vote on a new cabinet list, the parliament could not agree on a new line-up of non-partisan ministers, proposed by PM Abadi.

=== Massive demonstration against 'quotas and parties' ===
Muqtada al-Sadr, Shia cleric and leader of political party Sadrist Movement, on Tuesday 26 April 2016 called on his supporters to show up again in Baghdad at the Green Zone, where the government and parliament are based, to "frighten" MPs from "powerful parties" unwilling to approve the cabinet's reshuffle, announced by Prime Minister Haider al-Abadi in February 2016 (see above), and "compel" them to accept the prime minister's reforms, and again protest against the government's failure to provide basic commodities like water and electricity.

Hundreds of thousands of Sadr-followers that day gathered in Tahrir Square in Baghdad and marched towards the heavily-fortified Green Zone, chanting that politicians "are all thieves". "The political quotas and the parties that control everything are the reason for the failure of the government," protesters explained. That Tuesday, only a handful of ministers were approved by the parliament, the voting couldn't be completed due to disruptive behaviour of a dozen Members of Parliament, throwing water bottles towards the Prime Minister and preventing him from speaking.

=== Occupation of parliament by Sadr-supporters ===
On 30 April 2016, again the Iraqi parliament didn't vote on the full proposal of Prime Minister Haider al-Abadi for replacing party-affiliated cabinet ministers with non-partisan people (see above), because too few members (less than the 165 members required) had showed up. Muqtada al-Sadr, Shia Islamic cleric and leader of the political party Sadrist Movement, in a televised news conference again condemnded the political deadlock, criticised the "corrupt [officials] and quotas" – backed later by Iraqi President Fuad Masum who agreed that "burying the regime of party and sectarian quotas cannot be delayed" – and stated that he was "waiting for the great popular uprising and the major revolution to stop the march of the corrupt".

Thousands of Sadr's followers after that speech of Al-Sadr came to the Green Zone of Baghdad again, hundreds of them this time broke through the barricades of the Green Zone and stormed the parliament, and occupied the parliament's chamber. Security forces again did not clash with protesters, nor attempted to stop them from entering the parliament; members of a Sadrist armed group checked the entering protesters on the carriage of explosives while the remaining thousands of Sadr's protesters at the gates chanted: "Peaceful !" Some protesters nevertheless began ransacking or rampaging parts of the parliament building. Security forces declared a state of emergency.

Then, on a call from Muqtada al-Sadr to evacuate the parliament and set up tents outside, the protesters set up a camp on the lawn outside the parliament and, by pulling barbed wire across an exit road, effectively stopped some scared MP's from fleeing the parliament building and the chaos.

== 2017 ==
=== Protests against election committee ===
On Saturday 11 February 2017, thousands of followers of Muqtada al-Sadr – a Shia Islamic cleric and also oppositional politician of political party Sadrist Movement – held a protesting rally in the capital Baghdad, demanding an overhaul and replacement of the High Electoral Commission (election committee) which they, on the orders of al-Sadr, accused of corruption. Sadr himself claimed, that the commission members were loyal to his Shia rival and former prime minister Nouri al-Maliki. Security forces fired tear gas and rubber-coated bullets at the protesters; five protesters and two policemen were killed, 320 protesters and seven police officers wounded.

The Iraqi security forces sealed off routes leading to Baghdad's fortified Green Zone. Later that day, six or seven Katyusha-type rockets purportedly were fired at the Green Zone from within Baghdad, but with no casualties reported.

On Friday, 24 March 2017, again thousands of Muqtada al-Sadr followers protested in downtown Baghdad for the same purposes as in February: the accusation that the Iraqi election committee would be "corrupt" and that therefore, unless that committee would be overhauled, al-Sadr and his (Shiite) followers would boycott the upcoming Iraqi provincial elections. Al-Sadr instead incited his followers to join a "reform revolution".

=== Against corruption, failing government ===
Just like in the summers of 2015 and 2016, protests in Iraq's south were held also in the summer of 2017 in response to corruption, unemployment and failing public services.

== 2018 ==
=== Six causes for protest ===
The motives for the public protests in Iraq in 2018 were at least partly the same as in 2011, 2012–13, 2015, 2016 and 2017:

1. The main, and often shared, cause for protests in 2018 was the failing of basic, public services, like electricity supplies in (parts of) Iraq and clean drinking water especially around Basra,
  which many protesters considered to be a symptom of:
2. The incompetence and corruption of the federal as well as the local authorities;
3. A third, and connected, cause of protests was the very high unemployment in Iraq, especially under youths, who felt marginalized and cut out of opportunities by that same corrupt and clientelist political class and political economy;
4. Presumed negative influences of Iran on Iraq: Iranian officials meddling in Baghdad in the forming of a new Iraqi government; stagnation of the Iraqi economy being blamed on Iranian-backed Iraqi Shia parties like Dawa that were perceived as instruments of 'Tehran'; Iran cutting off its electricity supplies to Iraq, early 2018; Iranian dams along tributaries to the Tigris–Euphrates river system which between 1998 and 2018—according to Iraqi officials—had cut more than half of their water flowing to Iraq, specifically contributing to the water shortages in Basra Governorate; Iran polluting Iraqi drinking water resources (especially around Basra) by throwing saline drainage into that Tigris–Euphrates river system.
5. Furthermore, there was (connected) anger over the inability and/or unwillingness of the quarreling political parties in the newly elected parliament since the May 2018 general elections, especially the parties chosen by Iraq's Shiite majority, to form a government and start heeding the many needs of the Iraqi population (even by late December 2018 the installation of a full cabinet was not completed) – Shiite parties that often were presumed to be under Iranian influence and were presumed to be protecting their corrupt, rifling personnel. Iraqi citizens often didn't feel themselves heard nor represented by those politicians; the only Member of Parliament known to have expressed solidarity with the protesters in 2018 was Muqtada al-Sadr;
6. Another stone of offence were the large, foreign, oil companies in southern Iraq, reaping enormous profits from Iraq's natural riches, profits that stayed out of reach and out of sight of the average Iraqi citizens who were hardly even hired for work on the oil installations where the companies employed mostly foreign nationals rather than the local Iraqis around Basra, jobless and (as stated above) often deprived of basic supplies.

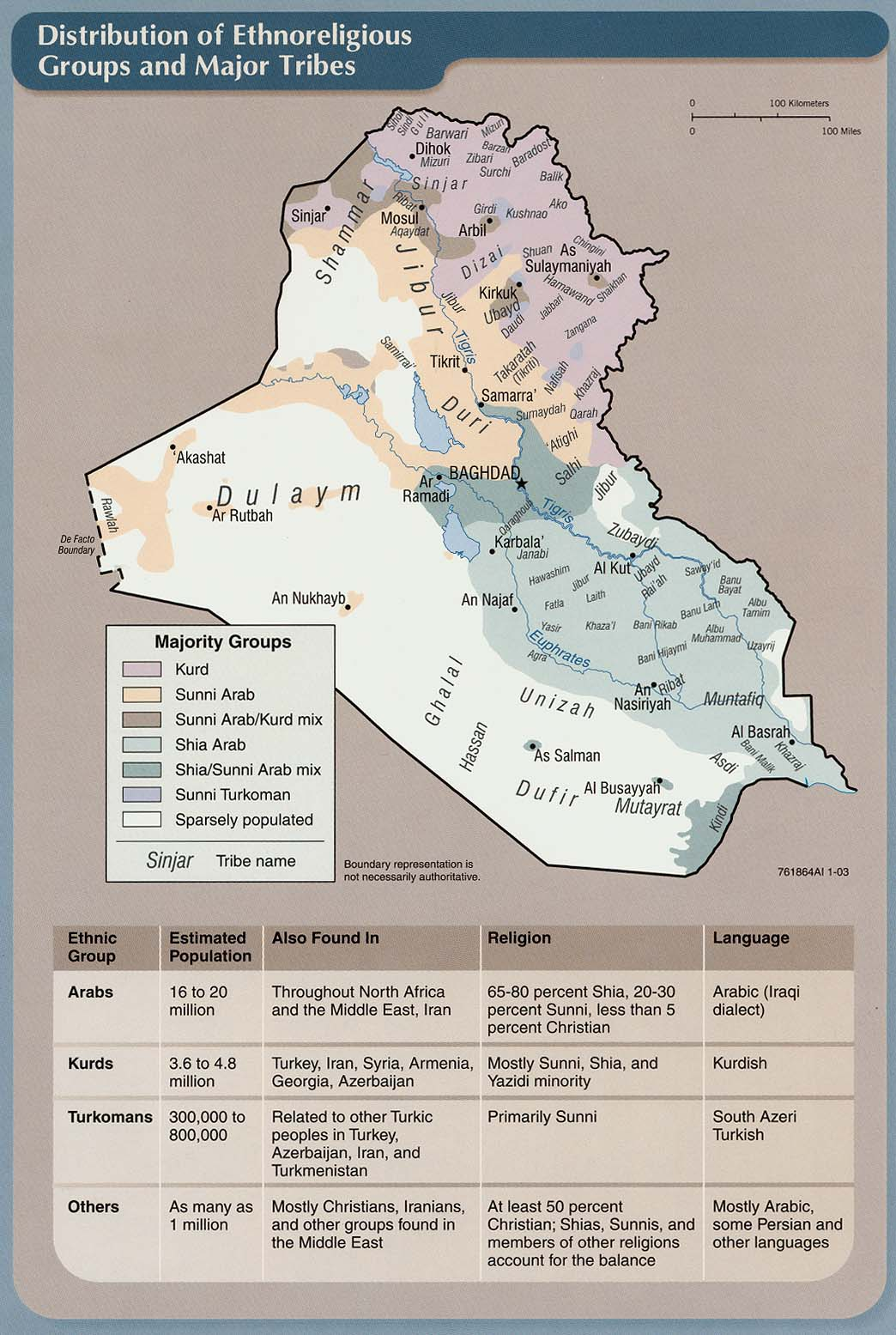
Map of Iraq (in 2003) indicating the Iraqi ‘Shiite heartland’ in southern and central Iraq where most of the protests in 2018 took place.

=== First wave of protests ===
Protests in 2018 started in Basra in June, just like previous years demanding improved public services and jobs. The protest movement this year was hardly or not organised, and not united behind one clear goal or agenda; it consisted of at best loosely connected groups, often with (partly) different grievances or motivations. The protesting mood was tightened when on 8 July in Basra a first protester was shot dead by security forces. Soon, the protests spread through all southern and central Iraq (where Shia Islam is prevailing or strongly present) and in capital Baghdad.

On 10 July 2018, protesters around Basra blocked roads leading to oil fields, but due to strong security measures around the oil installations there was no risk of Iraq's oil production being seriously disrupted. On Friday 13 July, in Najaf, protesters targeted offices of parties and militias with close ties to Iran (like Kata'ib Hezbollah, Dawa, Badr and Asa'ib Ahl al-Haq), shut down Al Najaf International Airport for a while, and government offices were sacked. On 14 or 15 July, the Internet in the Iraqi Shi'ite heartland (the country south and east of Baghdad) was blocked by the authorities, to stop the spreading of the protests.

Just like in 2015, the Shi'ite Grand Ayatollah Ali al-Sistani around 15 July 2018 spoke out in support of the protesters. On 15 July, In the province of Basra, a poster of Ayatollah Ruholla Khomeini, the founder of the Islamic Republic of Iran, was burnt on a main street. In two weeks in July 2018, 46 protests were counted in Basra province. By 20 July, ten protesters had been killed, by security forces or by rivalling civilian groups or individuals. Around 20 July, Prime Minister Abadi announced $3 billion in emergency funds to restore water, electricity and health services in Basra and develop further infrastructure and promised jobs for civilians living near the oil fields and in Basra.

=== Second wave of protests ===
Due to negotiations for a new government since the May 2018 general elections still dragging on, the money promised in July 2018 to help overcome Basra's urgent problems (see above) still hadn't materialised by September 2018. Early September, a cholera outbreak in Basra, caused by contaminated drinking water, evoked a second, more violent outburst of protests that year. The tap water in Basra being severely contaminated brought 30,000 people in need of medical treatment within ten days. Citizens and officials suspected Iran to have pumped contaminated water into Iraqi territory. On 3 September, one of the leaders of the protests, tribesman Makki Yassir al-Kaabi, was killed in Basra by security forces. Early on 4 September, Prime Minister Abadi promised to address the water pollution crisis in Basra, but offered no specifics. Later that day, the heavy rioting in Basra began, with demonstrators setting the Basra governor's building on fire; seven protesters that day were shot dead by security forces.

On 6 September 2018, more official buildings in Basra were set on fire; on 6 or 7 September the offices of the state-run Iraqiya TV station in Basra were attacked. On Friday, 7 September, protesters stormed and torched the Iranian consulate in Basra. They also burned Iranian flags and pictures of Iran's Supreme Leader Ali Khamenei while chanting: "Iran out, out!" Also the headquarters in Basra of most Iran-backed militia groups like Asa'ib Ahl al-Haq, Badr Organisation and Kata'ib al-Imam Ali, and of all further political parties connected to Iran, were torched. Ayatollah Ali al-Sistani, Iraq's most prominent Shia cleric, that day stated: the suffering of Basra is the result of "successive governments of quotas" and "cannot change if the new government would be formed on the same basis and standards". Muqtada al-Sadr, leader of the largest coalition in parliament since the May 2018 elections, tweeted at Prime Minister Abadi: "quickly release Basra's money and give it to clean hands to start at once with (...) development projects".

On 8 September 2018, a student was shot dead by one of those militias in Basra because he was protesting outside their office. The three-way-tensions in Basra between tribes, militias and government had for a long time been exacerbated by unclearness and confusion over the separation of competencies between the local and the federal authorities. Between 3 and 10 September 2018, in Basra province, twelve protesters were killed, and 75 protests were counted. On 8 September, Prime Minister Abadi again promised extra funds for Basra, like he had pledged in July 2018. Around 10 September, the organisers of the protests in Basra disassociated themselves from the violence which they blamed on "vandals", and called further demonstrations off. Another leader of those September protests, sheikh Wessam al-Gharrawi, was killed in November 2018 by unknown attackers. Protests in Basra lasted at least until December 2018 (and Iraqi protests would be resumed in October 2019).

== See also ==
- 2011 Iraqi protests
- 2012–2013 Iraqi protests
- 2019–2021 Iraqi protests
- Islamic State insurgency in Iraq (2017–present)
