= 2005 Kurdistan Region governorate elections =

- 31 January 2005

Aggregate 123 seats to the three Kurdistan Region governorates councils
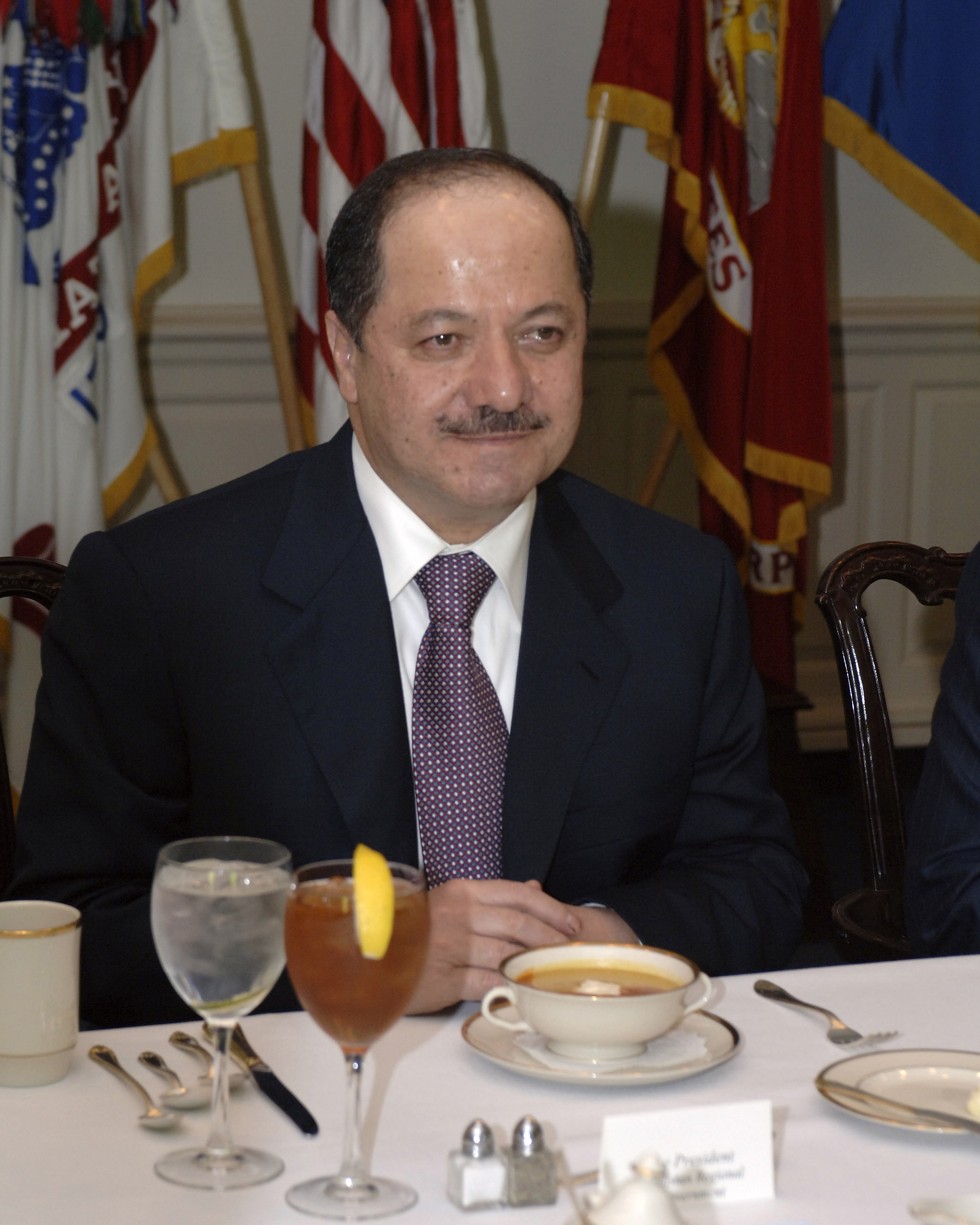

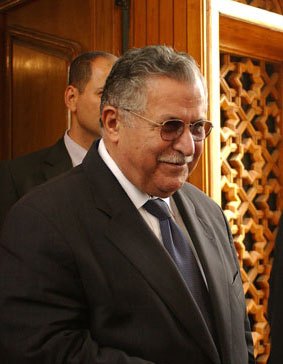

	First party	Second party	Third party
Leader	Massoud Barzani	Jalal Talabani	Salaheddine Bahaaeddin
Party	KDP	PUK	KIU
Seats won	61	48	10
Popular vote	741,483	765,544	133,206
Percentage	42.07%	43.43%	7.56%
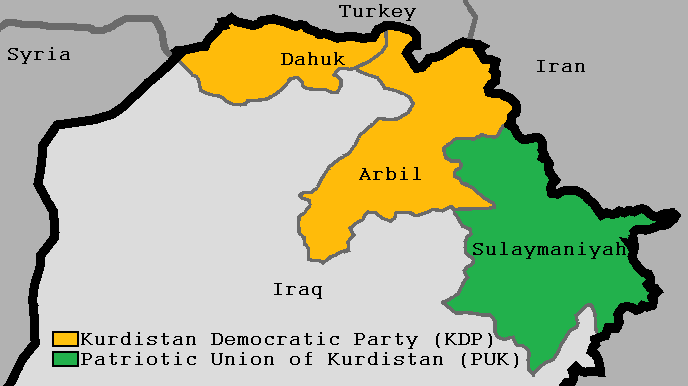
- Colours show which party won most votes in which each province

The Kurdistan Region Governorate Council elections of 2005 were held on 31 January 2005, to coincide with the Iraqi legislative elections of January 2005 and the Kurdistan Region legislative elections of January 2005. The elections were held to choose 41 council members for each of the three governorates of Kurdistan Region, that is Dahuk, Erbil and Sulaymaniyah governorates. During the election, the Patriotic Union of Kurdistan (PUK) won a plurality of the votes, however, the Kurdistan Democratic Party (KDP) won a plurality of the council seats.

== Results ==
=== All governorates ===
Party	Votes		Seats
Party	Total	%	Seats
Patriotic Union of Kurdistan (PUK)	765,544	43.43%	48
Kurdistan Democratic Party (KDP)	741,483	42.07%	61
Kurdistan Islamic Union	133,206	7.56%	10
other parties	122,349	6.94%	4
Total	1,762,582	100%	123
invalid ballots	35,084	(1.95%)	

=== Arbil Governorate ===
Party	Votes		Seats
Party	Total	%	Seats
Democratic Voice of Kurdistan List (KDP)	347,772	53.67%	23
Patriotic Union of Kurdistan (PUK)	244,343	37.71%	16
Kurdistan Islamic Union	22,523	3.48%	1
Kurdistan Islamic Group	18,781	2.90%	1
other parties	14,575	2.24%	0
Total	647,994	100%	41
invalid ballots	16,622		

=== Dohuk Governorate ===
Party	Votes		Seats
Party	Total	%	Seats
Kurdistan Democratic Party (KDP)	302,133	78.83%	33
Kurdistan Islamic Union	35,675	9.31%	4
Patriotic Union of Kurdistan (PUK)	35,483	9.26%	4
other parties	9,974	2.60%	0
Total	383,265	100%	41
invalid ballots	5,273		

=== Sulaymaniyah Governorate ===
Party	Votes		Seats
Party	Total	%	Seats
Patriot Union of Kurdistan (PUK)	485,718	66.42%	28
Kurdistan Democratic Party of Iraq (KDP)	91,578	12.52%	5
Kurdistan Islamic Union	75,008	10.26%	5
Kurdistan Islamic Group	53,088	7.26%	3
Communist Party of Kurdistan – Iraq	8,192	1.12%	0
other parties	17,739	3.43%	0
Total	731,323	100%	41
invalid ballots	13,189		

Source: Washington Institute: Provincial Politics in Iraq, pp. 15–16

== See also ==
- 2005 Iraqi governorate elections
