= Battle of Sulaymaniyah =

Part of the Iraqi uprisings following the Gulf War

- Part of the 1991 uprisings in Iraq
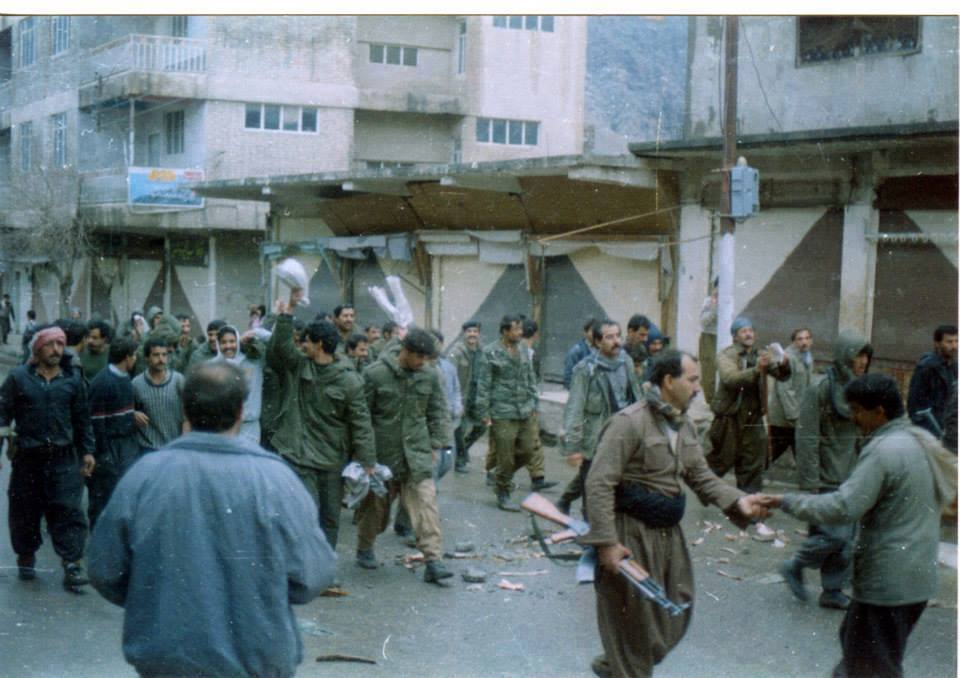
- Kurdish fighters during the battle
Date	5 March – 3 April 1991
Location	Sulaymaniyah, Iraqi Kurdistan
Result	Iraqi victory
Territorial changes	The Iraqi Army recaptures the city on 3 April, but it is retaken by Kurdish forces three months later.

Belligerents
Iraq; Republican Guard; Ba'ath Party loyalist forces	(Kurdistan Region) Peshmerga; Patriotic Union of Kurdistan; Kurdistan Democratic Party; Brigades of the Council Movement; Kurdish mujahideen

Commanders and leaders
(Iraq) Saddam Hussein (Iraq) Izzat Ibrahim al-Douri (Iraq) Ali Hassan al-Majid	Jalal Talabani; Nawshirwan Mustafa; Massoud Barzani Osman Hajy Marouf

The Battle of Sulaymaniyah was one of the battles fought during the 1991 uprisings in Iraq. Sulaymaniyah, a mostly Kurdish city with a population of over 100,000, was the first to be liberated by the rebels and the last to fall back to the Iraqi army. After three months the city was captured by Kurdish forces.

== Prelude ==
Since the autonomy agreement collapsed in 1974, Kurds had been fighting an armed insurgency against Saddam Husseins regime. After the Gulf War heavily damaged the Iraqi military and an uprising began in Southern Iraq, Jash (Kurdish militia used by Saddam's regime to fight Peshmerga) deserters, seized control of the city of Ranya with support of the local population. Many members of the Jash took sides with the Peshmerga. The revolutionary feeling spread to the rest of Kurdistan, where people took to the streets and Peshmerga entered the cities and seized control of Raniya, Chawar Qurna, Koi-Sanjaq, Sulaymaniya, Halabja, Arbat, Erbil, Dohuk, Zakho and Kirkuk.

== Uprising ==
=== Peshmerga offensive ===
The uprising started on 7 March as lightly armed Peshmerga entered the city and ousted government forces. The Peshmerga were joined by local civilians, who took the streets and helped the Peshmerga launch a mass assault on all government buildings and detention centers, freeing hundreds of political prisoners.

The last and biggest point of resistance by the Iraqi security forces was the heavily fortified Security Directorate. Ba'athist forces fought off the Kurds for over 2 hours, after which Kurdish Peshmerga and rioters entered the building; by 8 March, the entire city was under Peshmerga control. Many captured Ba'athists were torn to pieces, alive, by the angry crowds; others were burned or cut to pieces with saws. According to Human Rights Watch, an estimated 700 Ba'athists security personnel were killed in such executions by the people, but regular soldiers were mostly pardoned and allowed to return home.

=== Government counter-offensive ===
After the defeat of rebels in the south and the fall of all southern cities to Iraqi security forces, the Iraqi government turned north, where they deployed aircraft, heavy artillery and tanks to confront the Peshmerga. With food shortages and no international backing, the Peshmerga were outmanned and outgunned, with over three-quarters of the Iraqi army on the outskirts of Sulaymaniyah and 20,000 Peshmerga protecting the city. Heavy fighting occurred around the outskirts. The Peshmerga eventually retreated into central Sulaymaniyah after withstanding a ten-day assault by over 90,000 Iraqi troops supported by tanks and aircraft. Casualties were heavy on both sides. The outgunned Peshmerga lost 6,000 of their original strength of only 20,000, and because the Iraqi army lacked tactical training, they suffered dramatic casualties and lost nearly 17,000 troops.

On 31 March, the government offensive against the city itself started. It began from the west and focused on the civilian neighborhoods of Bakhtiari and Rizjari. The district of Azadi was also hit by heavy shelling and by attacks from helicopters. On 1 April, the Peshmerga attacked Iraqi tanks from the hills overlooking Bakhtiari, destroying a quarter of the Iraqi army's tanks; but by 2 April the Peshmerga called on civilians to evacuate the town and flee north before the Iraqi forces entered. In a last attempt to hold the city, the Peshmerga launched the suicidal Shahid Mahmood offensive, in which they wiped out several lines of Iraqi infantrymen, and by the end of 2 April had successfully captured the Sannandj road. To avoid annihilation, the remaining Peshmerga retreated back to Mount Qandil. By 3 April, the military took control of the city, which had turned into a ghost town as all civilians had fled in fear of government reprisals. The city therefore also remained relatively intact, although suffered heavy looting from Iraqi soldiers.

== Aftermath ==
After many Kurds had returned to their homes, in July the Peshmerga decided to confront the Iraqi Army again. On 20 July, the Kurdistan Democratic Party (KDP) and Patriotic Union of Kurdistan (PUK) Peshmerga launched a joint assault on the cities of Erbil, Dohuk and Sulaymaniyah. By October 1991, a cease-fire was signed, the government leaving the Peshmerga in control of some 16,000 km^{2} (6,200 sq mi) of land. This area became a de facto Kurdish state within Iraq and was completely blockaded by Saddam Hussein and cut off from the rest of the country.

== See also ==
- 2011 Kurdish protests in Iraq
- 1991 uprising in Karbala
- Al-Anfal campaign
- Kurdish Rebellion of 1983
- 2020 Kurdish protests in Sulaymaniyah Governorate
