= 2011 Iraqi protests =

Public protests

- Part of the Arab Spring and the protests against the Iraq War
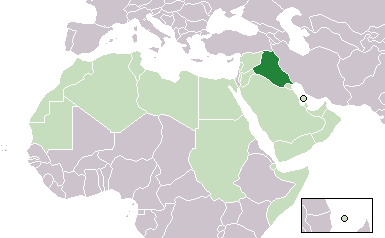
- Date: 12 February 2011 – 23 December 2011 (10 months, 1 week and 4 days)
- Location: Iraq
- Caused by: Corruption; Poor national security; Poor public services; Unemployment; Saudi & GCC intervention in Bahrain
- Methods: Demonstrations, riots

Casualties
- Deaths: 35
- Injuries: at least 296

The 2011 Iraqi protests came in the wake of the Tunisian revolution and 2011 Egyptian revolution. They resulted in at least 35 deaths, including at least 29 on 25 February 2011, the "Day of Rage".

Several protests in March were against the Saudi-led intervention in Bahrain.

Protests also took place in Iraqi Kurdistan, an autonomous Kurdish region in Iraq's north, and lasted for 62 days.

== Background ==
In an effort to prevent potential unrest, Iraqi Prime Minister Nouri al-Maliki announced that he will not run for a third term in 2014, and called for a constitutional term limit. Nevertheless, hundreds of protesters gathered in several major Iraqi urban areas on 12 February (notably Baghdad and Karbala) demanding a more effective approach to the issue of national security and investigation into federal corruption cases, as well as government action towards making public services fair and accessible. In response, the government of Iraq subsidised electricity costs.

== Protests ==
Israel's Haaretz reported that a 31-year-old man in Mosul died after he self-immolated in protest against unemployment. Haaretz also reported a planned "Revolution of Iraqi Rage" to be held on 25 February near the Green Zone.

=== Timeline ===
==== 12 February ====
Hundreds of protesters gathered in several major Iraqi urban areas, most notably in Baghdad and Karbala, demanding a more effective approach to the issue of national security and an investigation into federal corruption cases, as well as government action towards making public services fair and accessible. In response, the government of Iraq subsidised electricity costs.

==== 16–18 February ====
On 16 February, up to 2,000 protesters took over a provincial council building in the city of Kut. The protesters demanded the provincial governor resign due to a lack of basic services such as electricity and water. Up to three people were reported killed and 30 injured.

On 17 February, two people were killed as protesters threw stones at the headquarters of the Kurdistan Democratic Party, headed by Masoud Barzani, president of Iraq's semi-autonomous northern Kurdish region in Sulaimaniya, Iraqi Kurdistan.

On 18 February, around a thousand demonstrators blockaded a bridge in Basra, demanding the resignation of the provincial governor.

==== 23 February ====
Lt. Gen. Abdul-Aziz Al-Kubaisi (Arabic: عبد العزيز الكبيسي) resigned from his post as the Director General at the Iraqi Ministry of Defense, gave up his military rank, and removed it from his shoulders on television. Following this step, he was arrested by security forces. Al Kubaisi described the Iraqi government as corrupt and called on all officers to declare their resignation and join the demonstrators, who are planning a demonstration on 25 February.

Three officers, including one colonel, responded to this call and announced their resignations. Uday Zaidi, who has previously organized protests, revealed that these officers have joined the demonstrations. Zaidi told Al Jazeera that 37 personnel from the Ministry of Interior have also resigned and joined the crowds of demonstrators.

==== 24 February ====
On 24 February, Muntadhar al-Zaidi, an Iraqi journalist famous for the 2008 shoeing incident, was arrested for allegedly taking part in the protests. Al-Zaidi is popular in Iraq for what Iraqis see as his act of defiance.

==== 25 February–"Day of Rage" ====
Major protests were held throughout Iraq on 25 February, centering on the nation's high unemployment, corruption, and poor public services. During the protests, crowds stormed provincial buildings, in addition to jailbreaking prisoners and forcing local officials to resign. At least twenty-nine people were killed across the country as a result of protests on this day, though the deadliest protests took place in Iraqi Kurdistan.

==== 26 February ====
Protests were diminished from the 25 February "Day of Rage," due to the deaths that resulted during it. Hundreds were detained by Iraqi security forces, including journalists, artists, and intellectuals. One of the artists that was arrested, Hussam al-Ssair, later stated that "It was like they were dealing with a bunch of al-Qaeda operatives, not a group of journalists."

==== 16 March ====
New protests arose at Baghdad and Basra against the Saudi-led intervention in Bahrain.

==== 17 March ====
At Kerbela about 3,000 people demonstrated against Saudi Arabia. Nouri al-Maliki criticized the Saudi intervention.

==== April–May ====
Beginning on 9 April 2011, the 8th anniversary of the fall of Saddam Hussein, the protests escalated with thousands protesting in Baghdad's Tahrir Square (Liberation Square) and all over the country. The protests extended to anger at the US occupation, and culminated on 26 May 2011 with a demonstration organized by Muqtada al-Sadr. Reports of participants vary from 100 thousand (Iraq's official Al Sabaah) to half a million people (Baghdad's independent New Sabah ^{[ar]}). (The highest figures are not unlikely, as similar protests by Muqtada al-Sadr have drawn up to a million people, as in 2007 and 2012.)

==== 10 June ====
June 2011 protests in Liberation Square, Baghdad

About 400 protesters converged on Tahrir Square in Baghdad after Prime Minister Nouri al-Maliki's deadline for reform expired.

==== 12 August ====
Dozens protested in Tahrir Square, calling for Oil Minister Karim Luaibi to be fired, a planned port named for ex-President of Egypt Hosni Mubarak to be scrapped, and political prisoners to be released.

==== 2 December ====
The 2011 Duhuk riots refers to riots by Muslim Kurds on 2 December 2011 which were instigated by Friday prayers' sermons calling for Jihad against liquor stores and massage parlours in Zakho in the Duhok Governorate, Iraq. The riots soon developed to looting and burning down of Assyrian and Yazidi-owned properties in other towns in Iraqi Kurdistan over the next couple of days.

=== Responses ===
==== Domestic ====
In response to the initial round of protests, Prime Minister Nouri al-Maliki said that his ministers who do not improve their ministries face dismissal. An MP also called for provincial elections to be brought forward by two years.

== See also ==
- Iraqi insurgency (post-U.S. withdrawal)
- 2011 Kurdish protests in Iraq
- 2011 Dohuk riots
- 2012–2013 Iraqi protests
