= Atrush Field =

Oilfield in Iraqi Kurdistan

- Location within Iraqi Kurdistan
- Country: Iraq
- Region: Kurdistan Region
- Location: Shekhan District
- Offshore/onshore: Onshore
- Coordinates: 36°51′48″N 43°27′1″E
- Operators: HKN, Inc. (25%)
- Partners: Kurdistan Regional Government (25%) ShaMaran Petroleum Corp. (50%)

Field history
- Discovery: April 13th 2011
- Start of production: July 3rd, 2017

Production
- Current production of oil: 35,000 barrels per day (~1.7×10^{6} t/a)
- Estimated oil in place: 296 million barrels (~4.04×10^{7} t)
- Recoverable oil: 102.7 million barrels (~1.401×10^{7} t)
- Producing formations: Jurassic fractured carbonate

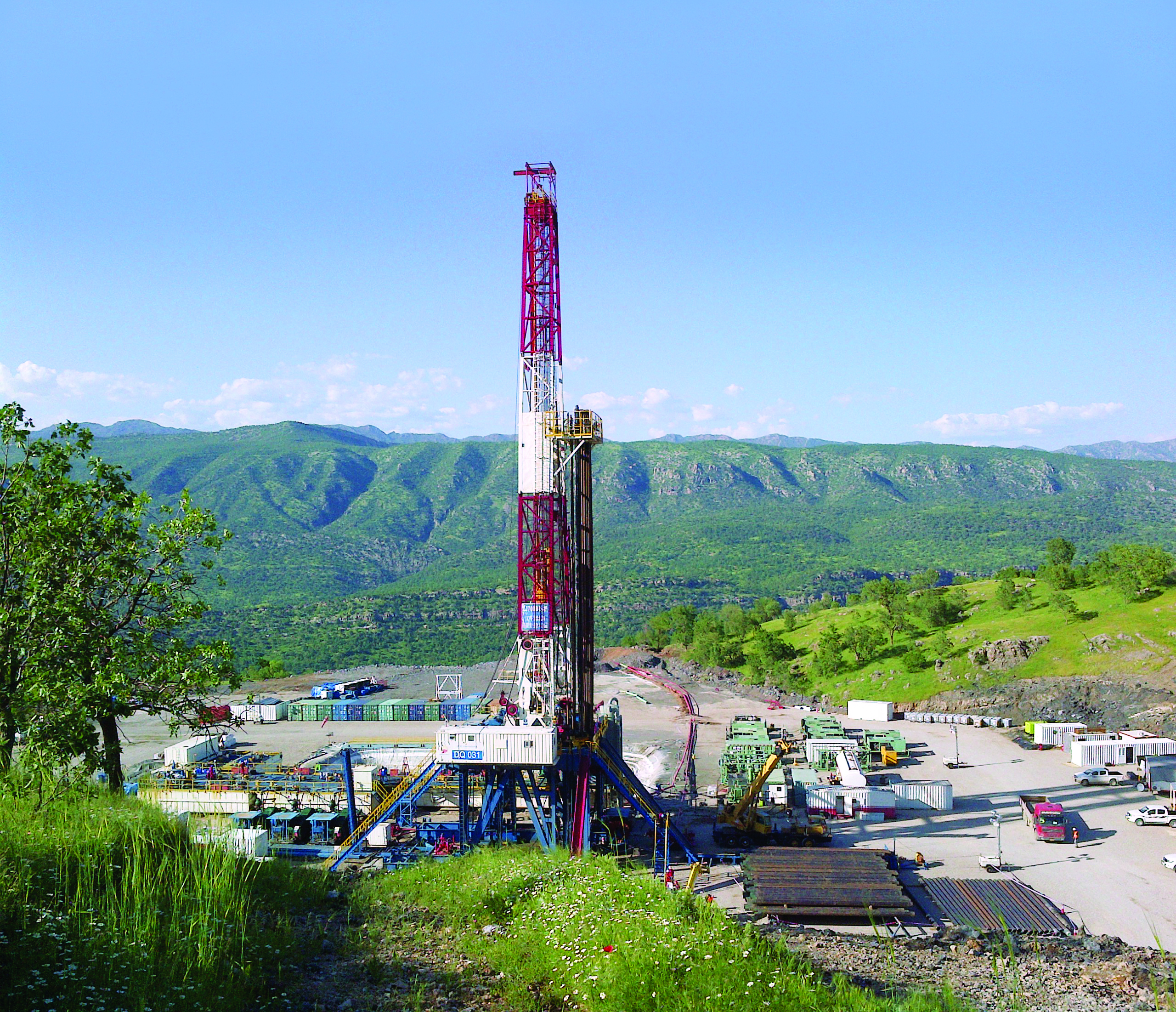
TAQA's Atrush Field in the Kurdistan Region of Iraq

Atrush Field is a Jurassic fractured carbonate oilfield near Dohuk, Iraqi Kurdistan. It was discovered by the Consortium of General Exploration Partners. As of March 12, 2013, the Kurdistan Regional Government (KRG) has exercised its option to acquire a 25% Government Interest of the Atrush Field according to the PSC contract.

General Exploration Partners (GEP) held 80% of Atrush and was in cooperation with Aspect Energy International, who owned 2/3 of GEP; thus, Aspect Energy International had a share of 53,2%. Aspect Energy International sold its interest in GEP to TAQA for $600 mln, which basically transferred Aspect's interest in GEP to TAQA. Shamaran's interest remained at 26,8% of Atrush, and the remaining 20% is held by Marathon Oil.

In June, 2018 Shamaran Petroleum announced that it intends to purchase Marathon Petroleum's 15% share of the Atrush Block., with effect from Jan 1, 2018. ShaMaran will acquire all shares of MOKDV - Marathon's Dutch subsidiary for US$63m. ShaMaran will then sell 7.5% working interest to Taqa for US$33m. The sale is expected to close in the first quarter of 2019.

On August 6, 2024, the company finalized its acquisition of TAQA Atrush B.V. and completed the previously announced sale of an indirect stake in Atrush to HKN Energy IV, Ltd. (the “Atrush Acquisition”), originally disclosed on January 22, 2024. Following this transaction, ShaMaran’s working interest in the Atrush Block rose from 27.6% to 50%. The Atrush Block entered its twenty-year development phase in the fourth quarter of 2013, with oil production beginning in the third quarter of 2017.

Oil began flowing through the Atrush Central Production Facility on July 3, 2017. In September 2017, an agreement for the sale of Atrush oil was signed between TAQA, its partners and the KRG. Under the agreement, the KRG will buy oil exported from the Atrush field by pipeline at the Atrush block boundary. The quality of the oil will force a price adjustment of approximately $16/bbl lower than the dated Brent oil price. All local and international transportation costs will be an additional fee. This discount is based on the principles similar to other oil sales agreements in the Kurdistan Region of Iraq.

== Atrush Field Naming Conventions ==
In 2014 after a meeting of the Atrush Management Committee and the KRG Ministry of Natural Resources changes in terminology used with respect to activity in the Atrush Field were made:

- “Atrush Block”, “Atrush PSC” & “Atrush Field” were unchanged.
- The structure (previously referred to as the “Atrush structure”) is renamed after the Chiya Khere mountain, i.e. the Chiya Khere structure.
- All production facilities will be known as the Chiya Khere facilities.
- Future wells will remain sequential but will be referred to as “Chiya Khere”, short-form “CK”, commencing with well #5.
- Well pads will be known as Chamanke A, B, etc.
- Historic wells, AT-1 through AT-4, will retain their original nomenclature.

== Wells ==
=== Atrush-1 (AT-1) Well ===
Atrush-1 (AT-1) well was successfully spudded on October 5, 2010. The well had a natural flow of 6,393 barrels of oil per day. General Exploration Partners discovered 726 meters of oil column and 120 meter netpay. The well has since been permanently abandoned

=== Atrush-2 (AT-2) Well ===
Atrush-2 (AT-2) well was successfully spudded on May 23, 2012. The well had a flow of 42212 barrels of oil per day using a Submersible pump, estimated to have been the highest flow ever in Iraqi Kurdistan. The design of the DST Program, as well as the permanent completion, was managed by Daniel Riedel, Richard Sharpe, Damon Yarshenko, and Wes Whitman with key execution support provided by core contractors. AT-2 was completed for production in Q3 of 2016.

=== Atrush-3 (AT-3) Well ===
Atrush-3 (AT-3) well was believed the well spudded on 26 March 2013 but there is no information confirming this for now.

==== AT-3 Well Summary ====
- In December 2018 the well was worked over as a heavy oil production well and is now ready for the heavy oil extended well test.

=== Atrush-4 (AT-4) Well ===
Drilled in 2014, Atrush-4 (AT-4) well is the second well to be drilled in support of the Phase One Facility.

==== AT-4 Well Summary ====
- High-angle deviated well. 82° was the maximum hole angle. This demonstrated that the field could be developed, using directional wells in the face of extremely rugged terrain.
- The well was drilled from the AT-1 pad, which is correctly known as Chamanke-A.
- The Jurassic reservoir is approximately 72m higher than when it was encountered in AT-1.
- Two limited well tests were performed for fluid samples.
- The combined rate of fluid production was over 9,000 barrels (1,400 m^{3}) of oil per day of 26°API oil.
- There wasn't an indication of a gas cap.
- An interference test was also conducted. The test demonstrated instantaneous pressure communication with AT-2.
- AT-4 was suspended as Phase One Facility producer.
- AT-4 was completed for production in Q3 of 2016.
- Clean-up attempts were made during 2018, but resulted in disappointing productivity the well is now awaiting work-over for a smaller pump.

=== Chiya Khere-5 (CK-5) Well ===
Chiya Khere-5 (CK-5) well was completed in Q3 of 2015.

=== Chiya Khere-6 (CK-6) Well ===
Chiya Khere-6 (CK-6) Phase 2 appraisal well has a total depth of 2,105 metres. The TAQA-operated well reached TD on November 5, 2014, after 36 operational days. Part of the eastern part of the Atrush block the well is located on the Chamanke C pad. This pad is also the location of AT-3. CK-6 is a directional well, drilled in SSE direction from the surface. CK-6 encountered the Jurassic age reservoir at a higher elevation (≈139 metres) than the nearby AT-3 well. As of January 2019 the well is awaiting a work over to become an observation well during the heavy oil extended well test of AT-3.
The well was recompleted in February 2019 and came online for production in May 2019 at 4,500 barrels (720 m^{3}) of oil per day.

==== Well Testing ====
DST #1
- Formation: Alan
- Perforated interval: 12 metres
- Using an Electric Submersible Pump (ESP) and nitrogen lift the heavy oil was produced at a low rate.
- The test interval was the deepest from which oil has been recovered. At -460 m below sea level, the CK-6 oil was found to be almost 200 m deeper than the oil recovered from the equivalent reservoir in well AT-2.
- The viscosity of the recovered oil was lower than the oil from AT-2.

=== Chiya Khere-7 (CK-7) Well ===
Chiya Khere-7 (CK-7) appraisal and development well drilling operations commenced prior to September 19, 2017. CK-7 is located in the central area of the Atrush Block. The producing well, AT-2, is approximately 3 kilometres to the east, while AT-3 is 3.5 kilometres to the west. The well is most likely being drilled from the Chamanke E pad. The objectives are to add another producing well by appraising the Mus formation's commercial potential and to reduce the uncertainty in determining the depth of the medium to the heavy oil transition zone. The well is expected to reach the 1,575 metre Total Depth within 52 days, using the Romfor 25 drilling rig.

=== Chiya Khere-8 (CK-8) Well ===
Chiya Khere-8 (CK-8) well was completed in Q3 of 2015

=== Chiya Khere-9 (CK-9) Well ===
Chiya Khere-9 (CK-9) water disposal well, was drilled successfully as planned and is ready for water injection.

=== Chiya Khere-10 (CK-10) Well ===
Chiya Khere-10 (CK-10) well was drilled in June 2018 and tied into the facility in July 2018.

=== Chiya Khere-11 (CK-11) Well ===
Chiya Khere-11 (CK-11) is a deviated infill production well, located on the Chamanke-G pad, that was spud on 3 January 2019, the Sargelu formation is the target.
The well was drilled to its final depth by mid-March, came online for production on May 10, 2019, produced at 5,500 barrels (870 m^{3}) of oil per day (during July 2019) and increased to 8,500 barrels (1,350 m^{3}) of oil per day in September 2019.

=== Chiya Khere-12 (CK-12) Well ===
Chiya Khere-12 (CK-12) is a 2,400 metre deviated infill production well, located on the Chamanke-E pad that was spud in 2019, the well was brought on production on August 10, 2019.
CK-12 was drilled to its final depth at the end of May 19, 2019, where the reservoir was found to be 25 metres deeper than the prognosis indicated. CK-12 well was left cased and suspended until a workover rig was used to complete CK-12 in July 2019. Production commenced on August 10, 2019. CK-12 is currently producing at a rate of 2,000 barrels (320 m^{3}) of oil per day from the Mus Formation.

=== Chiya Khere-13 (CK-13) Well ===
Chiya Khere-13 (CK-13) located on Chamanke-E, is a 2,340m deviated infill production well that was spud in June 2019, drilled to TD by August 19, 2019, and brought on production on September 18, 2019, at a rate of 6,000 barrels (950 m^{3}) of oil per day. This well encountered the target Formation at 23 metres lower than expected depth. The failure by TAQA's development geologist, well operation geologist and the geological manager to accurately forecast formation depths is rumoured to be a sore point within the partnership.

=== Chiya Khere-14 (CK-14) Well ===
No mention of CK-14 has ever been publicly announced.

=== Chiya Khere-15 (CK-15) Well ===
Chiya Khere-15 (CK-15) is a deviated infill production well at the Chamanke-G drilling location. The well was spudded on October 5, 2019, and came online on December 8, 2019.

=== Heavy Oil Extended Well Test (HOEWT) ===
During 2018 the operator installed heavy oil well testing equipment. The equipment will provide 5,000 barrels (790 m^{3}) of oil per day additional processing capacity at the Chamanke C pad, where AT-3 is located. Heavy oil production to should begin in February 2019.
In fact, the HOEWT was delayed until mid-April., the well was brought on production in Q3 2019.

=== Chiya Khere-16 (CK-16) Well ===
CK-16, a water disposal well, supplements well CK-9. The well reached TD on May 20, 2022, and was completed over the Sarki reservoir in July 2022 and water disposal also commenced in July 2022

=== Chiya Khere-17 (CK-17) Well ===
The drilling and completion, on time and under budget, of a side-track CK-17 well (from Pad A) to recover from the upper Jurassic Sargelu reservoir was spud on April 1, 2021. In July 2022 the well underwent a workover operation to increase production. It was expected to be completed by August 2022.

=== Chiya Khere-18 (CK-18) Well ===
According to a post on Linkedin.com by TAQA's Drilling and Completions Manager during the week of September 6, 2022, CK-18 (Pad G) successfully reached TD as the first horizontal well in the Atrush block. The manager also stated that the horizontal drain length was 1016 metres. The Atrush production well CK-18, spudded from the Chamanke G Pad, was drilled to total depth in September 2022 with a 950m section drilled horizontally through the Lower Jurassic Mus formation. The well is currently being sidetracked and is expected to be recompleted during 2023.

=== Chiya Khere-19 (CK-19) Well ===
In October 2022 the Atrush production well, CK-19, was spudded from the Chamanke C Pad. Targeting the Upper Jurassic Sargelu formation, the well is forecast to commence production in Q1 2023.

=== Chiya Khere-20 (CK-20) Well ===
The CK-20 production well was drilled from the Chamanke E Pad in February 2023. The well was drilled to a total depth of 1,753m and completed over the Upper Jurassic in April 2023.

=== Chiya Khere-21 (CK-20) Well ===
The CK-21 infill well is scheduled to be spudded in the fourth quarter of 2025, with production anticipated to begin in the first quarter of 2026 to fully leverage the increased facility capacity. The CK-21 well was completed successfully and achieved initial production rates of roughly 6.0 Mbopd.

=== Chiya Khere-22 (CK-22) Well ===
No mention of CK-22 has ever been publicly announced.

=== Chiya Khere-23 (CK-23 Well ===
No mention of CK-23 has ever been publicly announced.

=== Chiya Khere-24 (CK-24) Well ===
No mention of CK-24 has ever been publicly announced.

=== Chiya Khere-25 (CK-25) Well ===
CK-25 was successfully drilled to the target reservoir but was subsequently suspended after the production casing was cemented due to prevailing security concerns.

=== Future wells ===
Drill and complete additional production wells. One of the wells is to be drilled from the Chamanke-A pad several hundred meters to the west of AT-1. The other to be drilled from Chamanke-G pad landing south east of AT-1 and south west of CK-5.The well from Chamanke-A indicated that plans to build Chamanke-D pad to the west of Chamanke-A have been scrapped. This is reportedly due to the inability of the TAQA land negotiation team to secure the property and the incompetence of the facilities construction team to build a pad before 2024. There was speculation that these wells will not be drilled in 2021 or 2022 as TAQA reportedly dismissed their operations geologist, whose presence would be mandatory during drilling. This speculation proved to be false with the drilling of 2 wells in 2022. In fact Atrush capital expenditures for 2022 planned at $116 million ($32 million net to ShaMaran). This capital program includes drilling and completing three development wells, including one water injection well.

=== Producing Wells ===
There are a total of eleven producing wells: Atrush-2, (“AT-2”) Chiya Khere-5 (“CK-5”), Chiya Khere-7 (“CK-7”), Chiya Khere-8 (“CK-8”) and Chiya Khere-10 (“CK-10”). In 2019, Chiya Khere-6 (“CK-6”), Chiya Khere-11 (“CK-11”), Chiya Khere-12 ("CK-12"), and Chiya Khere-13 ("CK-13") have also been added as production wells. In December 2019, Chiya Khere-15 ("CK-15") was also listed as a production well. Well CK-17 has been added as a production well. Atrush production well CK-18, in September 2022. In October 2022 the Atrush production well, CK-19 was spud.

=== Wells Pads ===
- Chamanke A Construction completed, AT-1, AT-4, CK-5, CK-8 and CK-17 were drilled here.
- Chamanke B Construction completed, AT-2 was drilled here, the pad is commonly referred to as PF-1 as it is the home of the Production Facility.
- Chamanke C Construction completed, AT-3, CK-6 and CK-19 were drilled here. This is where the heavy oil extended well test occurred.
- Chamanke D Proposed location is 2 km west of Chamanke A
- Chamanke E Construction completed, the location is 2 km east of Chamanke B and is the site of CK-7, CK-10, CK-12 and CK-13
- Chamanke F Proposed location is east of Chamanke C
- Chamanke G Construction completed, the location is northeast of Chamanke B and CK-9, CK-11, CK-15 CK-16 and CK-18 were drilled from here.

== Facilities ==
A 30,000 barrels (4,800 m^{3}) of oil per day Phase 1 facilities has been completed. As of September 29, 2017, the facility has achieved a regular daily export of more than 22,000 barrels (3,500 m^{3}) of oil equivalent. Facility production is expected to increase to 30,000 barrels (4,800 m^{3}) of oil equivalent per day during 2017.
In June 2018 Shamaran Petroleum reported a partial blockage of the production facility's heat exchanger. Sediment samples were analyzed and it was determined that the blockage was caused by salt. The most probable source of the salt might be drilling fluid losses from the drilling of CK-5 and AT-2. The heat exchanger was cleaned. A trial process of injecting freshwater at the CK-5 wellhead and separating saltwater out at the production facility's separator have significantly reduced the quantity of salt in the crude to be processed for export.
As of June 2018, approximately 20,000 barrels (3,200 m^{3}) of oil per day of processed oil is being exported. Water injection at the wellhead will continue while gradually increasing production as the field personnel closely monitor the facility. Water injection is limited due to the small daily disposal capacity, once the CK-9 water disposal well is completed in the second half of 2018, the capacity will increase. The average daily production for 2018 was about 22,200 barrels (3,530 m^{3}) of oil per day, the rate at the end of December 2018, was 27,500 barrels (4,370 m^{3}) of oil per day.
During 2019, debottlenecking the 30,000 barrels (4,800 m^{3}) of oil per day facility will occur.

Average production for November 2019 was 43,360 barrels (6,894 m^{3}) of oil per day.

An Early Production Facility (EPF) was installed at the Chamanke E pad in Q3 2019. The EPF has a capacity of 10,000 bbl per day.

=== Phase-1 Production Facility Schematic ===
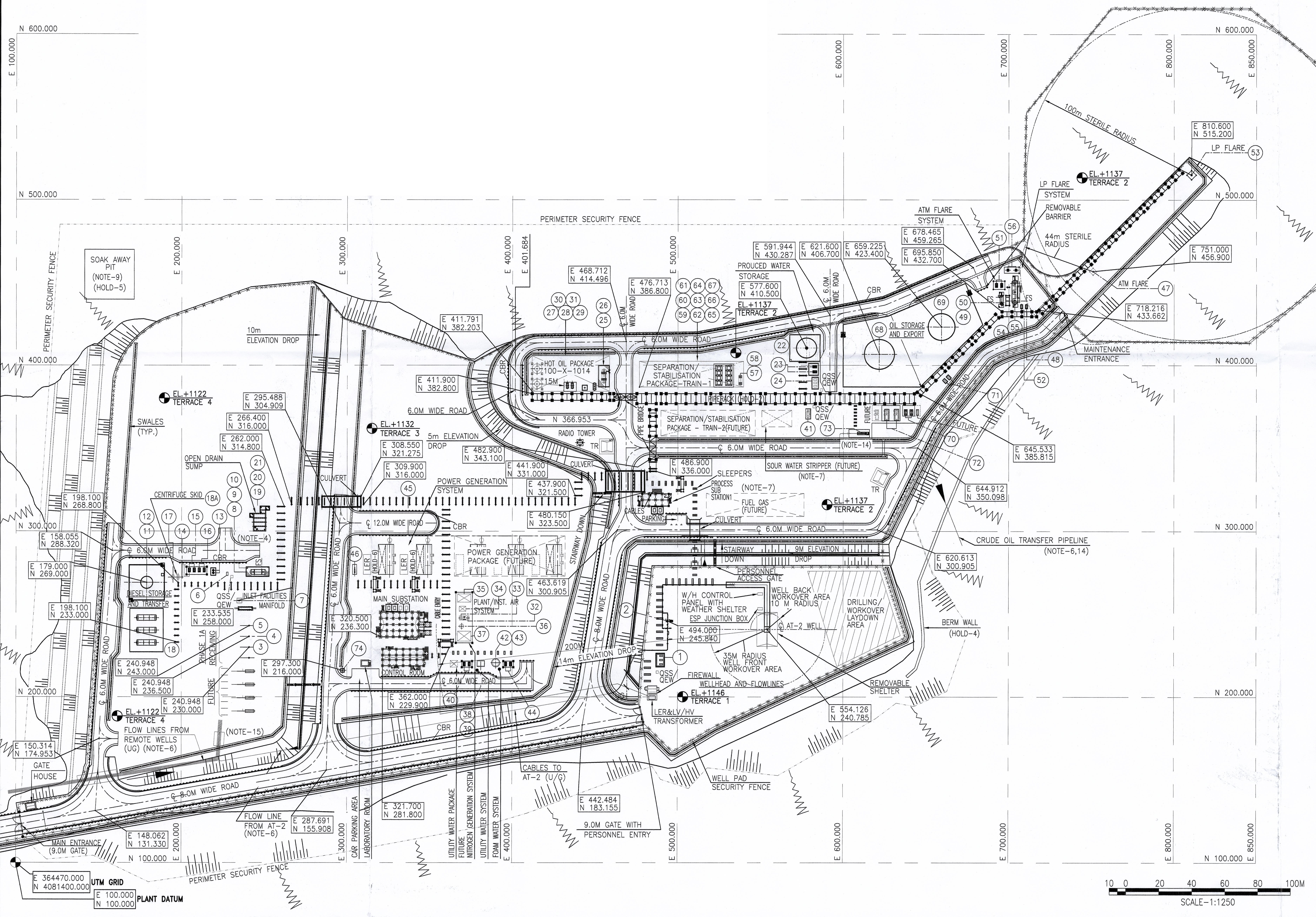

== Pipeline ==
- Pipeline project has been completed
- The pipeline is made up of 4 sections.
  - A 25 centimetres (10 in) Spur line from the Phase 1 facility to the Intermediate pigging and pressure reduction station
  - A 30 centimetres (12 in) Spur line from the Intermediate pigging and pressure reduction station to the southern Atrush block boundary
  - A 30 centimetres (12 in) Feeder line from the southern Atrush block boundary to the Shaikan block's south boundary
  - A 91 centimetres (36 in) Feeder line from the Shaikan block's south boundary to the Kurdish Export Pipeline.

== Monthly Production Data ==
Monthly Production Data
| Date | Volume (bbl/d) | Volume (m^{3}/d) | Comment |
|---|---|---|---|
| July 2017 | 4,800 | 760 | |
| August 2017 | 18,300 | 2,910 | |
| September 2017 | 21,400 | 3,400 | |
| October 2017 | 13,300 | 2,110 | Facility shut down to address production constraints |
| November 2017 | 25,400 | 4,040 | |
| December 2017 | 26,300 | 4,180 | |
| January 2018 | 26,600 | 4,230 | |
| February 2018 | 23,900 | 3,800 | |
| March 2018 | 20,200 | 3,210 | Back-produced salt plugs facilities |
| April 2018 | 11,900 | 1,890 | |
| May 2018 | 15,100 | 2,400 | |
| June 2018 | 20,100 | 3,200 | |
| July 2018 | 19,100 | 3,040 | Shut down to tie-in CK-7, CK-10 |
| August 2018 | 21,400 | 3,400 | Frequent pipeline outages |
| September 2018 | 24,500 | 3,900 | Flushed stripper column |
| October 2018 | 26,800 | 4,260 | |
| November 2018 | 28,200 | 4,480 | |
| December 2018 | 27,500 | 4,370 | CK-10 ESP failure |
| January 2019 | 26,900 | 4,280 | |
| February 2019 | 23,500 | 3,740 | 7day Export Pipeline Shutdown |
| March 2019 | 28,100 | 4,470 | |
| April 2019 | 29,000 | 4,600 | |
| May 2019 | 28,600 | 4,550 | Reboiler Flushing and CK-8 ESP Failure |
| June 2019 | 27,100 | 4,310 | CK-8 ESP Replacement |
| July 2019 | 33,900 | 5,390 | CK-8 ESP Online |
| August 2019 | 35,300 | 5,610 | CK-12 Online |
| September 2019 | 30,285 | 4,815 | |
| October 2019 | 38,040 | 6,048 | |
| November 2019 | 43,360 | 6,894 | |
| December 2019 | 43,400 | 6,900 | |
| January 2020 | 47,800 | 7,600 | |
| February 2020 | 45,700 | 7,270 | |
| March 2020 | 46,100 | 7,330 | |
| April 2020 | 46,800 | 7,440 | |
| May 2020 | 46,500 | 7,390 | |
| June 2020 | 47,000 | 7,500 | |
| July 2020 | 47,000 | 7,500 | |
| August 2020 | 46,100 | 7,330 | |
| September 2020 | 44,900 | 7,140 | |
| October 2020 | 43,600 | 6,930 | |
| November 2020 | 39,800 | 6,330 | |
| December 2020 | 38,700 | 6,150 | |
| January 2021 | 37,600 | 5,980 | |
| February 2021 | 37,700 | 5,990 | |
| March 2021 | 39,100 | 6,220 | |
| April 2021 | 42,100 | 6,690 | |
| May 2021 | 41,900 | 6,660 | |
| June 2021 | 34,500 | 5,490 | |
| July 2021 | 42,100 | 6,690 | |
| August 2021 | 41,400 | 6,580 | |
| September 2021 | 40,100 | 6,380 | |
| October 2021 | 37,800 | 6,010 | |
| November 2021 | 28,000 | 4,500 | |
| December 2021 | 39,700 | 6,310 | |
| January 2022 | 38,400 | 6,110 | |
| February 2022 | 39,000 | 6,200 | |
| March 2022 | 39,000 | 6,200 | |
| April 2022 | 39,900 | 6,340 | |
| May 2022 | 38,500 | 6,120 | |
| June 2022 | 37,100 | 5,900 | |
| July 2022 | 36,500 | 5,800 | |

Pre-2019 numbers for barrels are rounded down to the nearest 100 barrels per day.
2019 and forward data without specific citations were generated using software to evaluate published charts. These numbers are estimates and could be subject to change.

== Estimated Reserves (December 31, 2017) ==
| | PROVED | PROVED | TOTAL | PROBABLE | TOTAL PROVED | POSSIBLE | TOTAL PROVED, |
| | DEVELOPED | UNDEVELOPED | PROVED | PROBABLE | & PROBABLE | POSSIBLE | PROBABLE & POSSIBLE |
Light/Medium Oil (Mbbl)^{(1)}
| Gross^{(2)} | 4,211 | 3,026 | 7,237 | 12,385 | 19,622 | 12,020 | 31,641 |
| Net^{(3)} | 2,975 | 1,673 | 4,648 | 6,347 | 10,996 | 3,999 | 14,995 |
Heavy Oil (Mbbl)^{(1)}
| Gross^{(2)} | - | 282 | 282 | 745 | 1,026 | 685 | 1,711 |
| Net^{(3)} | - | 181 | 181 | 394 | 575 | 236 | 811 |

^{(1) The actual split between Light/Medium Oil and Heavy Oil is uncertain.}

^{(2) Based on the Shamaran's 20.1 percent share.}

^{(3) Based on Shmaran's share.}

== Estimated Contingent Resources (December 31, 2017) ==
Contingent Resources
| | Light & Medium Oil (MBBL)^{(3)} | | | Heavy Oil (MBBL)^{(3)} | | | Natural Gas (MMCF) | | |
|---|---|---|---|---|---|---|---|---|---|
| Contingent Resources^{(1)(2)} | Gross | Shamaran Interest | | Gross | Shamaran Interest | | Gross | Shamaran Interest | |
| Contingent Resources^{(1)(2)} | 100% | Gross^{(4)} | Net^{(5)} | 100% | Gross^{(4)} | Net^{(5)} | 100% | Gross^{(4)} | Net^{(5)} |
| Low Estimate (1C) | 67,796 | 13,627 | N/A | 106,680 | 21,479 | N/A | 25,477 | 5,121 | N/A |
| Best Estimate (2C) | 68,756 | 13,820 | N/A | 227,412 | 45,710 | N/A | 46,895 | 9,426 | N/A |
| High Estimate (3C) | 76,606 | 15,398 | N/A | 372,875 | 74,948 | N/A | 73,477 | 14,769 | N/A |
| Risked Best Estimate | 55,004 | 11,056 | N/A | 181,930 | 36,568 | N/A | 2,343 | 471 | N/A |

== Map ==
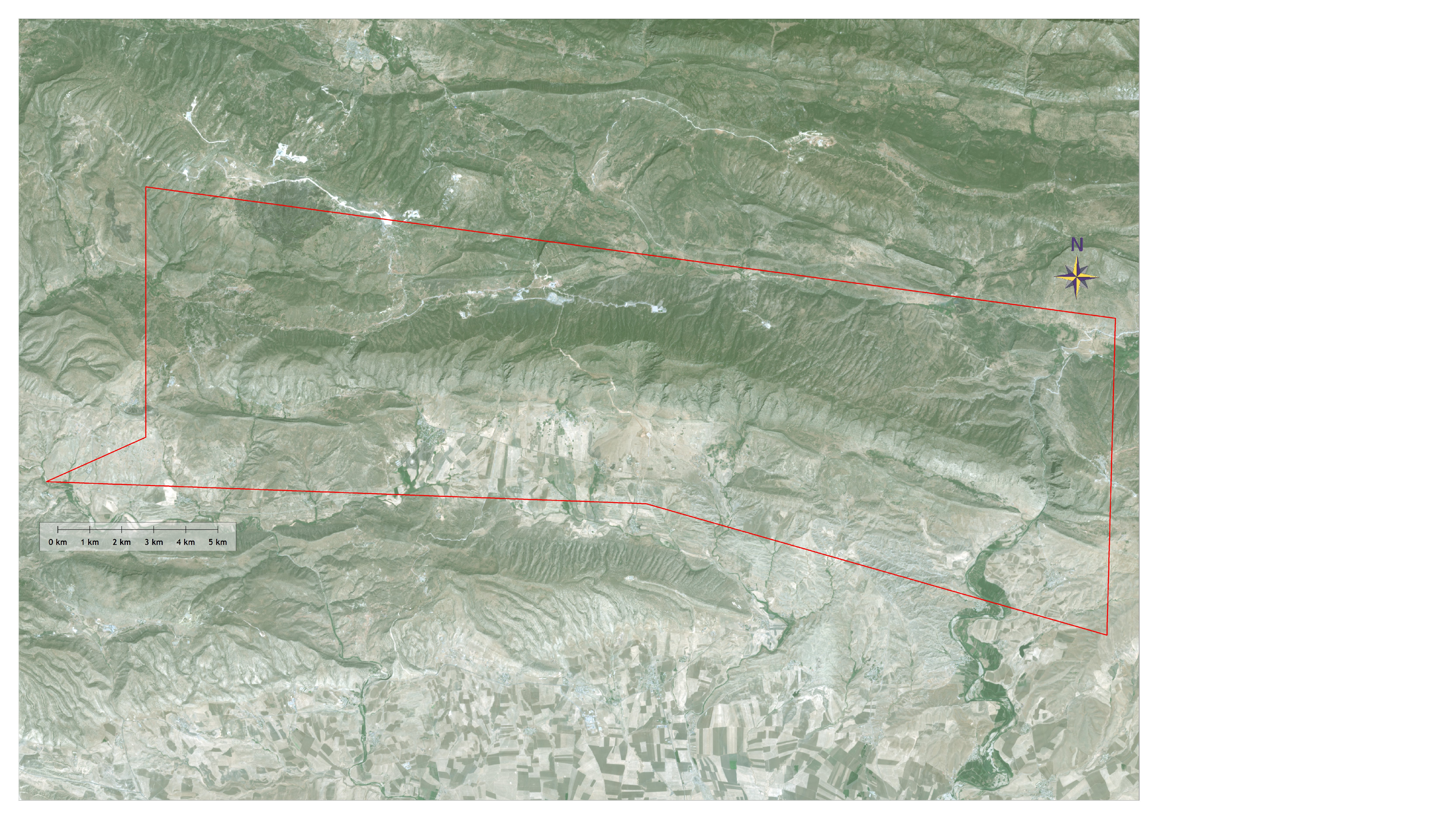
Atrush Field from space with the block boundary in red, taken September 4, 2018, by the European Space Agency - ESA produced from ESA remote sensing data image processed by SNAP Desktop 6.0.3
