= Sharazoor District =

Halabjay Taza District قه‌زای شاره‌زوور
- District
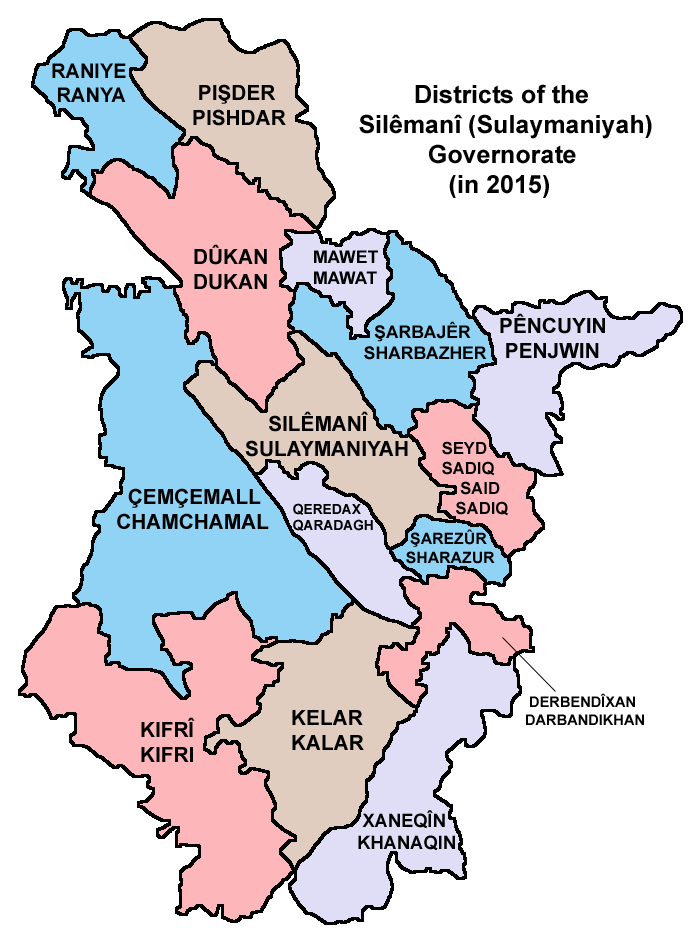
- Districts of the Sulaymaniyah Governorate
- Country: Iraq
- Governorate: As Sulaymaniyah Governorate
- Seat: Halabjay Taza
- Time zone: UTC+3 (AST)

The Sharazoor or Sharazur District (Kurdish: قه‌زای شاره‌زوور, romanized: Qezay Şarezûr) is a district of the Sulaymaniyah Governorate in the Kurdistan Region, Iraq.

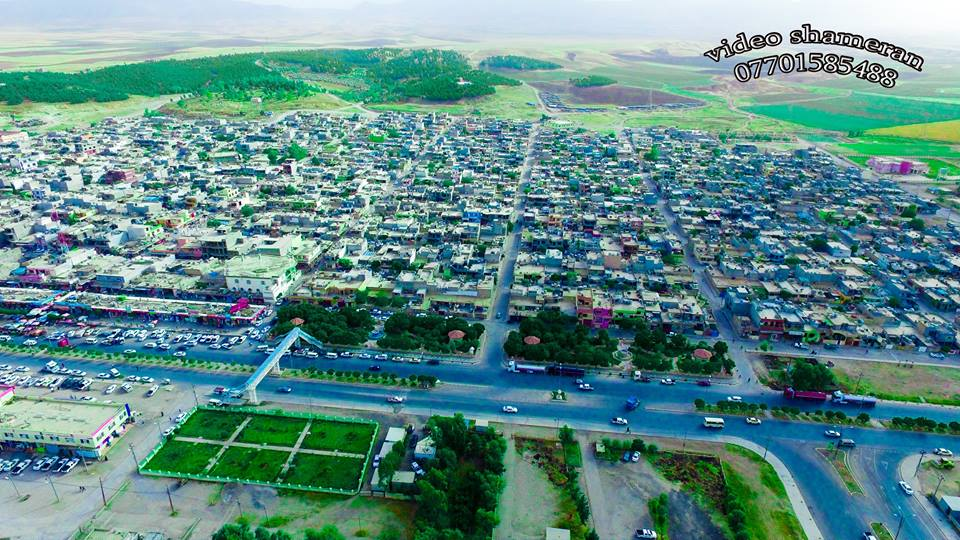
The town of Zarayan in the north of the district

== See also ==
- Shahrizor
