= 2020 storming of the Kurdistan Democratic Party headquarters =

Riot and attack on KDP offices in Baghdad

- Part of Iraq–Iran relations
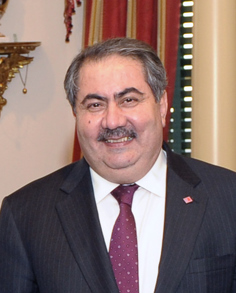
- Hoshyar Zebari, former Iraqi Foreign Minister
Date	October 17, 2020
Location	Karrada, Baghdad, Iraq 33.3152°N 44.4000°E
Result	KDP headquarters stormed and set on fire; Protestors retreated; Iraqi security criticized for inaction

Belligerents
Supporters of Popular Mobilization Forces	KDP

Commanders and leaders
Unknown	Hoshyar Zebari

Units involved
Pro-militia protesters	KDP staff and security

Casualties and losses
None	

The Kurdistan Democratic Party was attacked on Saturday, October 17, 2020. The angry Popular Mobilization Forces supporters stormed the KDP offices in Karrada district in central Baghdad after the former Iraqi Foreign Minister Hoshyar Zebari said in an interview with Alhurra that "the Iraqi Government needs to clean up the Green Zone from the presence of the Popular Mobilization Forces" to protect the major road connected to Baghdad International Airport. The demonstrators set the KDP building on fire and burned Kurdish flags. The Iraqi prime minister Mustafa Al-Kadhimi decided to dismiss the manager of security forces in Baghdad general Jawad Al Daraji after Iraqi security abstained from preventing the protestors.
