= 2011 Duhok riots =

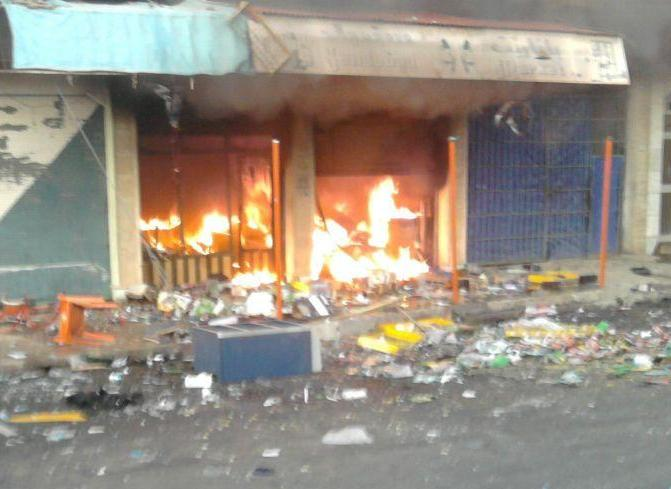
- Shops in Zakho after the riots
- Date: December 2–5, 2011
- Location: Kurdistan Region, Iraq
- Caused by: Islamic sermons
- Goals: To destroy massage parlors and alcohol shops
- Methods: Arson, coercion
- Result: Widespread property damage, arrest of KIU members

The 2011 Duhok riots refers to riots which began on December 2, 2011, in the Duhok Governorate, Iraq. They were instigated by Friday prayers' sermons by Ismail Osman Sindai, a Kurdish imam, calling for attacks against stores selling alcohol and massage parlours in Zakho. The riots soon developed into the looting and burning down of Assyrian- and Yazidi-owned properties in other towns in the governorate, causing four million dollars of damage.

The riots ended after Kurdistan Regional Government security forces intervened and began a massive crackdown on demonstrators. As a result of the riots, a group of secular Kurds attacked a number of buildings belonging to the Kurdistan Islamic Union party.

== Background ==
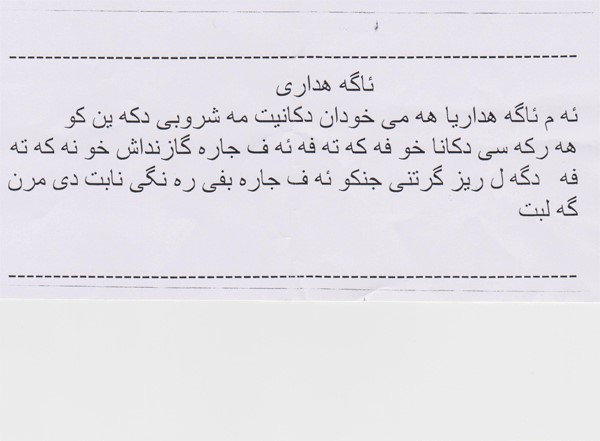
A threatening letter written in Kurdish directed to alcohol shop owners

Assyrian personalities in the region had been wary of the changes of the Arab Spring, particularity the rise of radical Islamism. The riots started in Zakho, the northernmost town of Iraq, located close to the Turkish border. The town has a majority Kurdish population with a sizeable Assyrian and Yazidi minority.

== Friday events ==
The small riots were instigated by Friday sermons in the northern city of Zakho after Muslim clerics called for the destruction of stores that sold alcohol in the city on December 2, 2011. Angry youth mobs attacked Assyrian- and Yazidi-owned businesses such as stores, hotels, casinos, and massage parlors in the northern town of Zakho. The violence spilled into nearby towns of Duhok and Semel. Many Assyrian social clubs and homes were also attacked throughout the province. Angry Kurdish pro-government supporters that belonged to the Patriotic Union of Kurdistan and Kurdistan Democratic Party suspected Muslim Brotherhood-inspired Kurdistan Islamic Union (KIU) clerics to be behind the violence and attacked offices of the Islamic party in Duhok and Erbil overnight. However, in an official statement, the KIU denied any connections to the riots.

The riots ended three days later with the strong response from the Kurdistan Regional Government.

== Aftermath ==
On December 3, the Kurdish intelligence agency Asaish arrested 20 KIU members of parliament and high officials within the party. The President of Iraqi Kurdistan Masoud Barzani ordered the formation of a committee to investigate the event. In an official press release, he stated: "I condemn both these unlawful acts. I call on the people of the Kurdistan Region to preserve our traditions of ethnic and religious co-existence. I have ordered the formation of a committee to look into these disturbances and bring to justice those responsible."
