= Kurdistan Democratic Party =

Political party in Iraqi Kurdistan

Kurdistan Democratic Party پارتی دیموکراتی کوردستان Partiya Demokrat a Kurdistanê
- President: Masoud Barzani
- Founder: Mustafa Barzani
- Founded: 16 August 1946; 80 years ago
- Headquarters: Masif Selahaddin, Erbil Governorate, Kurdistan Region, Iraq
- Ideology: Kurdish nationalism National conservatism Economic liberalism Authoritarianism; Secularism; Atlanticism
- Political position: Big tent
- Colours: Yellow
- Council of Representatives of Iraq: 26 / 329
- Kurdistan Region Parliament: 39 / 100

Party flag

Website
- kdp.info

Armed Wing (Zeravani)
- Leader: Masoud Barzani
- Dates active: 1946–present
- Headquarters: Erbil, Kurdistan Region
- Active regions: Iraq; Kurdistan region
- Size: 75,000 (active personnel); 30,000 (reserved personnel)
- Wars: List: Before 2003: First Iraqi–Kurdish War; Second Iraqi–Kurdish War; PUK insurgency; Iran–Iraq War; 1983–1986 Kurdish rebellions; Kurdistan Region–PKK conflict; Anfal campaign; Gulf War; 1991 Iraqi uprisings; Battle of Sulaymaniyah; Kurdish Civil War; Islamist insurgency in Kurdistan; After 2003: 2003 invasion of Iraq; Operation Viking Hammer; First Iraq War; Iraqi insurgency (2003–2011); Iraqi civil war (2006–2008); Iraqi insurgency (2011–2013); War in Iraq (2013–2017); US intervention in the Syrian civil war; 2017 Iraqi–Kurdish conflict; Islamic State insurgency in Iraq (2017–present); Kurdistan Region–PKK conflict

The Kurdistan Democratic Party (Kurdish: پارتی دیموکراتی کوردستان, romanized: Partiya Demokrat a Kurdistanê), usually abbreviated as KDP or PDK, is the ruling party in Iraqi Kurdistan and the senior partner in the Kurdistan Regional Government. It was founded in 1946 in Mahabad in Iranian Kurdistan. The party states that it combines "democratic values and social justice to form a system whereby everyone in Kurdistan can live on an equal basis with great emphasis given to rights of individuals and freedom of expression."

The KDP is dominated by the Barzani tribe and the party's stated ideologies are conservatism, secularism, and Kurdish nationalism.

== History ==
=== Foundation ===
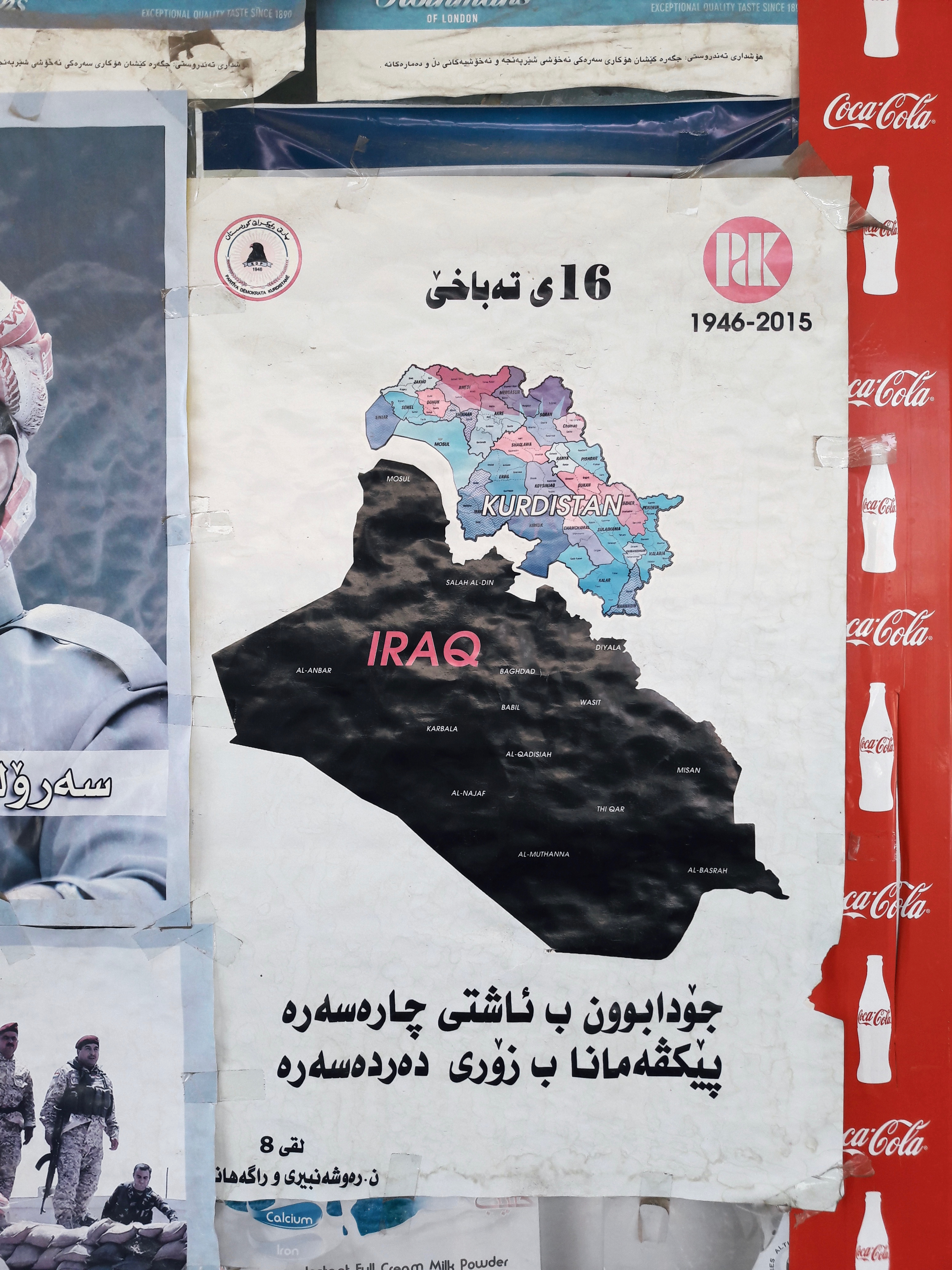
KDP propaganda poster in Zakho, 2016

In 1946, the leader of the Soviet-backed Republic of Mahabad, Qazi Muhammad, announced the formation of a "Kurdish Democratic Party" based in Iran, or Eastern Kurdistan. The Soviet Union, then supporting the Kurdish national struggle against the monarchies of Iran and Iraq, instructed Mustafa Barzani to place himself under the authority of Qazi Muhammad. It is not clear whether Barzani ever formally agreed to this arrangement, but as a fugitive from Iraqi authorities he relied upon the goodwill of the Iranian Kurds and their Soviet backers, and local Kurds were ordered by the authority of the Republic of Mahabad to house and feed his destitute forces.

It was "well known in nationalist circles that the relations between the two men [Barzani and Qazi] were not easy". Barzani attempted to create a special dispensation for the Barzanis in Iran, but Qazi rebuffed them stating "There is to be only one party, and you must not operate separately from it." In the meantime, Barzani was negotiating with Baghdad to allow his return to Iraq, and was successfully attempting to convince prominent Iraqi Kurds of the need for an Iraqi KDP. Rizgari, the Kurdish section of the Iraqi Communist Party (ICP), was vehemently opposed to the idea, as it would fracture the purpose of pan-Kurdish unity and give legitimacy to the Iraq-Iran border that divided Kurdistan.

Nevertheless, Barzani's manoeuvrings were successful and he split Rizgari, even gaining support from committed leftists because of the wide popularity he enjoyed amongst Kurdish people, and his position as chief notable of the tribal elders, who it was argued, the nationalist movement needed on their side if it were to be militarily successful.

The new KDP of Iraq held its first congress in Baghdad on August 16, 1946. The 32 delegates elected a central committee with Hamza Abdullah as secretary-general, Shaykh Latif and Kaka Ziad Agha as vice-presidents, and Barzani as president-in-exile. The party demanded autonomy for Iraqi Kurdistan, stating that the political and economic situation of the Kurds in Iraq was different from that of Iran. The party programme was not specific about any social or economic content for fear of alienating the highly conservative tribal chiefs and landlords who had agreed to support it.

=== Consolidation ===
After the collapse of the Mahabad republic in early 1947, Ibrahim Ahmad, previously the Sulaymaniyah representative of the Iranian KDP (KDP-I), joined the Iraqi KDP. Ahmad was a highly influential Leftist intellectual, who by 1951 had succeeded in rallying most of the Iraqi Kurdish leftist-nationalists to the KDP, which in turn, took the opportunity to convene a second party congress and duly elect Ahmad as secretary-general (effectively acting chairman).

Throughout the late 1940s and early 1950s, the KDP and the Kurdish members of the Iraqi Communist Party steadily increased their working relationship – in many cases fielding joint candidates. The ICP campaigned directly against the aghas (tribal elders) and won the support of the workers in the cities of Erbil, Duhok, and Sulaymaniyah – while the KDP reassured the aghas that the ICP was ultimately under their control. By 1954 the KDP was advocating the replacement of the Iraqi monarchy with a popular democratic republic – much to the consternation of many of their tribal supporters.

Indeed, in 1956, the antagonism between the Kurdish aghas and the KDP-ICP reached such a height that emissaries for the former contacted the British consul in Mosul requesting arms and finance to establish an "anti-Communist and independent Kurdistan" in northern Iraq.

=== Under revolutionary Iraq ===
On July 14, 1958, Brigadier Abd al-Karim Qasim and his fellow "Free Officers" (modeled after Nasser's Egyptian Free Officers) staged a successful coup that promised a brighter future for the Kurds of Iraq. Although the KDP and ICP were excluded from the new United National Front government, Qasim formed a three-man "Sovereignty Council" of a Sunni, a Shi'i, and a Kurd. The KDP immediately pledged its support for the new regime, in its newspaper hailing a new era of "freedom and equality for the Kurdish and Arab peoples".

Ibrahim Ahmad attempted to pressure Qasim into including Kurdish autonomy in the Provisional Constitution. However, Qasim was under much greater pressure from his deputy Abdul Salam Arif and other pan-Arab Nationalists – not least the Ba'ath – who wanted to take Iraq into the United Arab Republic (UAR). They objected to Qasim's apparently pro-Kurdish attitude and his friendliness towards Mustafa Barzani in particular.

Qasim and Mulla Mustafa had developed a close relationship, as Qasim saw in Barzani a powerful military ally that he could employ as a counterweight to the pan-Arab nationalists, who, he feared, threatened to subvert Iraq to Nasser's Egypt. Qasim had officially named him Chairman of the KDP (a position he held on paper since the party's founding), gave him one of Nuri as-Said's old residences in Baghdad, an automobile, and a "handsome monthly stipend" (salary). Mulla Mustafa would prove his loyalty in March 1959, where he helped Qasim suppress a serious uprising in Mosul of pan-Arab nationalists and Ba'athist officers – at the behest of Mulla Mustafa, Kurds, in tandem with the Communists (also led by a Kurd) attacked Mosul wreaking havoc on Nationalists and Baathists and killing as many as 2,500 people in four days. While the Communists and Kurds settled scores, Qasim used the revolt as a pretext to purge Nationalists and Baathists from the Iraqi armed forces and government.

Qasim used an almost identical event that July, but this time in Kirkuk, as a pretext to act against the KDP's closest allies, the Communists. In 1959 half of the 150,000 population of Kirkuk was Iraqi Turkmen, with the balance comprising Kurds, Arabs, Assyrians, and Armenians (in that order). Mulla Mustafa's triumphal visit to the city the previous October had resulted in bloodshed, but this time killings were carried out by Communist and Kurdish members of a group called the "Popular Resistance Force", who attacked shops and their owners. As many as 50 Turkmen were killed. Qasim held the Communists responsible and claimed to have uncovered plans for a similar action in Baghdad. During the next few months, Mulla Mustafa helped Qasim reduce the ICP and there was open conflict in Iraqi Kurdistan between the KDP, backed by Kurdish tribesmen, and the Kurdish Communists.

Meanwhile, an ideological rift developed in the KDP between the intellectual and leftists Ibrahim Ahmad and Jalal Talabani on the one hand, and Mulla Mustafa and the Barzanis on the other. Mulla Mustafa "talked freely, with a bitterness amounting to hatred, against the... intellectual presumptuousness of the KDP politicians, singling out Ibrahim Ahmad for his particular dislike". While Ahmad complained of Mulla Mustafa's "selfishness, arbitrariness, unfairness, tribal backwardness and even his dishonesty." But while each wanted to reduce the others' influence in the KDP, each also knew that the other was indispensable in securing the loyalty of their respective support-bases – the tribal villagers and nomads for Barzani, and the urban and educated for Ahmad/Talabani.

During the 1950s, Mulla Mustafa strengthened his position by eliminating the forces of rival tribes – the Harkis, Surchis, Baradustis, and Zibaris. Qasim urged restraint, but Mulla Mustafa pressed on regardless, a much intertribal bloodletting followed, eventually taking such scalps as Ahmad Muhammad Agha, chief of the Zibaris.

As a result of this and past violence in Mosul and Kirkuk, Qasim slowly began to distance himself from the Mulla Mustafa and the KDP, and in a 1960 speech publicly disparaged the Barzani clan. Qasim feared Barzani hegemony and began supporting the Harki and Zibari tribes against Mulla Mustafa. The Kurds for their part, in particular Ibrahim Ahmad and Jalal Talabani, felt increasingly frustrated that Qasim had taken no practical steps towards Kurdish autonomy.

Kurdistan slowly and almost inadvertently headed towards revolt, and between 1961 and 1963, violence engulfed Kurdistan and the longstanding divisions between the socialist-nationalists such as Talabani, and Mulla Mustafa and the old tribal Aghas solidified as they disagreed as to how to conduct the revolt and for what purpose. Mullah Mustafa unsuccessfully sought the assistance first of Britain, and then the USA – which lost him any of the remaining allies he had in the Iraqi Communist Party. The whole country descended into chaos as a quarter of the villages of Kurdistan were attacked and 80,000 refugees created. Qasim not only lost control of the mountains of Kurdistan, but was being isolated politically in Baghdad by the pan-Arab nationalists, and it seemed only a matter of time before he lost power.

=== Early Ba'ath Party rule ===
The KDP, together with many other Kurds, welcomed the February 1963 Iraqi coup d'état, believing the various Baath assurances that Kurdish autonomy would be guaranteed. Unfortunately for the Kurds, the zeitgeist had thoroughly turned against them, as in Baghdad there was a widespread belief that they were being used as a Trojan horse by either Iran, the West, or both. Negotiations on the status of Kurdistan deadlocked, especially over the status of Kirkuk. The KDP demanded control over the city and its rich oilfields, whereas the government countered that the 1947 census showed that Kurds made up only 25% of the population of the city, and Iraqi Turkmen over half. Mulla Mustafa threatened war, and Baghdad took up the challenge. Baath troops occupied Sulaymaniyah and declared martial law and a curfew, rounding up political leaders and activists. Three days later when martial law was lifted, 80 bodies were found in a mass grave and hundreds more went missing. Kurdish delegates were arrested throughout Iraq, and the intellectuals of the KDP quarreled with Mulla Mustafa over his tactics.

The first Ba'ath government was overthrown and replaced by a "National Command of the Revolutionary Council" (NCRC) led by Abdul Salam Arif. While this regime's ideology was essentially the same, it favored peace with the Kurds as the war had been costly and unpopular. Indeed, Arif had contacted Mulla Mustafa before the coup in order to elicit his co-operation to resist the Baath offensive until he could oust them himself.

Mulla Mustafa signed an agreement with Arif in his personal capacity, rather than as president of the KDP. This infuriated Ibrahim Ahmad and Jalal Talabani as the agreement omitted any mention of self-administration, let alone autonomy – the whole point for which they had been fighting. Arif threatened force against any Kurdish opponent of Mulla Mustafa, while Mulla Mustafa declared that any resistance to Baghdad would constitute a declaration of war against himself and the Barzanis. Mulla Mustafa informed Arif that he had no objection to the abolition of Kurdish political parties, so long as it served the "interests of Iraq", and began to receive arms and funds from Abdul Salam Arif.

Yet again, the Kurdish political scene was divided between the intelligentsia of Ibrahim Ahmad and Jalal Talabani who decried this complicity, and as they saw it, submission to Baghdad, and Mulla Mustafa who rallied the conservatives and tribal leaders to his side. Furious debates and campaigning followed, but Ahmad's and Talabani's arguments could not dislodge Mulla Mustafa's position as the popular figurehead of the Kurdish people. Mulla Mustafa would accept not dissent, and, fearing for their lives, Ahmad and his followers slipped away at night from a heated discussion with Mulla Mustafa, and retreated back to their stronghold in Mawat.

At the sixth Party Congress of the KDP in July 1964, representatives from the Ahmad-Talabani faction were promptly arrested upon arrival. A few fays later Mulla Mustafa sent his son, Idris Barzani with a large force to drive Ahmad, Talabani, and their 4,000 or so followers into exile in Iran. With that, Mulla Mustafa had finally achieved undisputed control of the KDP.

In the ensuing four years until the next Ba'ath coup, the Kurds continued their guerrilla war against the Iraqi regime. By 1966, Mulla Mustafa had enlisted the support of Baghdad's two foremost ideological enemies – Iran and Israel. He believed these two countries, in addition to the United States, would ultimately help him win independence from Baghdad.

In 1968, the second Ba'ath Coup was successful, and an agreement called the Bazzaz Declaration was reached between the KDP and the Ba'ath. Although Ba'ath Party founder Michel Aflaq called for equal rights for all ethnic and religious minorities under Arab rule, in practice the new regime ultimately became more chauvinist than any before. The Arab nationalists had not forgotten the atrocities they suffered at the hands of the Mulla Mustafa and the Barzanis in 1959. One of the Baath's leading advocates of a more considered and amenable approach to the Kurdish question in these early days was Saddam Hussein. Ahmad and Talabani also welcomed the new Ba'ath regime, as they felt more at home with its socialist ethos than any previous Baghdad government.

Nevertheless, Baghdad was growing apprehensive with regards to Iran's continued involvement in Kurdistan – including supplying sophisticated artillery to Mulla Mustafa – and its recent claim to sovereignty over Bahrain. In an attempt both at appeasement and to undermine the growing strength of Mullah Mustafa, the Baath government declared its commitment to the 1968 Bazzaz Declaration and announced that Kurdish should be taught in all Iraqi schools and universities; that a new Kurdish university was to be established in Sulaymaniyah; and that Nawruz was to be recognized as a national holiday. Mulla Mustafa pressed on regardless, and shelled the government's oil installations in Kirkuk – much to the embarrassment of Baghdad internationally, particularly with the British-owned Iraqi Petroleum Company.

Talabani and Ahmad then sought the endorsement of the new Ba'ath regime, presenting themselves as both more responsible leaders and closer in ideology to the Ba'ath. In reality both Mulla Mustafa and Ahmad-Talabani jostled for influence and recognition from Baghdad. President Ahmed Hassan al-Bakr was trying to consolidate his power in Arab Iraq, especially against the communists, so he ordered his deputy Saddam Hussein to travel to Kurdistan to reach a peace agreement with the Kurds. In 1970, Saddam traveled to Kurdistan to conclude an accord with Mulla Mustafa. A truly democratic, federalist, and equitable 15-point agreement was reached, and the accord concluded with the statement "History will bear witness that you [the Kurds] did not have and never will have as sincere a brother and dependable an ally as the Arab people."

The peace didn't last long. As might be expected, the earliest obstacle was the demographic one. In 1972, when the government proposed to apply the 1957 census figures to Kirkuk, Mullah Mustafa rejected it, knowing that it would show the Iraqi Turkmen were the majority in the city – and given the events of 1959, the Turkmen were likely to prefer Ba'ath rule to Kurdish. Mulla Mustafa refused to close the border with Iran as he had agreed to, and appealed to the United States for aid despite promising not to seek outside assistance. Moreover, by mid-September 1972 Mulla Mustafa was receiving a US$50,000 stipend from Israel to distract and undermine the Ba'ath. Meanwhile, the government nationalized the country's oil facilities, provoking Kurdish fears that they would lose out on their own oil resources. Rhetoric on both sides intensified, and there were clashes in Kirkuk and Sinjar. Mulla Mustafa boasted to the Washington Post in June 1973: "We are ready to act according to US policy, if the US protect us from the wolves. In the even of sufficient support we should be able to control the Kirkuk oilfields and confer exploitation rights on an American company."

Negotiations dragged on, but Mulla Mustafa was unwilling to budge on Kirkuk – despite being advised to do so by his own European advisors.

Emboldened by offers of support from the US, Israel, and Iran, Mulla Mustafa allowed the deadline to expire. This caused several high-ranking KDP Politburo members to defect to the Iraqi National Front in Baghdad. The most significant of these defections was that of Mulla Mustafa's eldest son, Ubayd Allah Barzani, who claimed that his father "does not want self-rule to be implemented even if he were given Kirkuk and all of its oil. His acceptance of the law will take everything from him, and he wants to remain absolute ruler," further condemning his father for failing to implement agrarian reform. Around this same time a section of the KDP (led by Hashim Aqrawi, Ahmad Muhammad Saeed al-Atrushi and Barzanis son Ubaidallah) split to join the Ba'ath-sponsored National Progressive Front.

==== 1974–75 war ====
With approximately 50,000 trained Peshmerga and possibly another 50,000 irregulars at his disposal, Mulla Mustafa was confident in the face of an Iraqi military assault. Against such a force Baghdad could deploy 90,000 troops, but importantly backed by over 1,200 tanks and armored vehicles, and 200 aircraft. With Iranian, as well as covert American and Israeli support, the Peshmerga were able to combat the technologically superior Iraqi army. Iranian support ended when it reached an agreement with Iraq during the OPEC Conference in March 1975, encouraged by the United States, culminating in the 1975 Algiers Agreement. Unable to continue receiving ammunition for its anti-air and anti-armor weaponry, Mulla Mustafa ordered the KDP to begin retreating to avoid repercussions from the Iraqi Army. 200,000 Kurdish refugees fled to Iran, and there were somewhere in the region of 20,000 casualties on each side

After its suppression of the armed resistance, the Ba'ath razed at least 1,400 villages to create a security belt along the Turkish and Iranian borders. At least 600,000 civilians were deported to collective "re-settlement camps", with anyone caught trying to abandon these camps being executed on the spot. The Iraqi government also used this opportunity to settle demographic scores in their favor – resettling Kurds from disputed territories and moving in Arab families in their place. The Ba'ath even offered financial incentives to Arabs who took Kurdish wives.

=== Under Saddam Hussein ===
Former flag of KDP

In the wake of their defeat during the 1974–1975 War, Mustafa Barzani and his sons Idris and Masoud fled to Iran. The power vacuum they left behind was thus filled by their ideological nemesis Jalal Talabani, who, together with his leftist supporters announced in Damascus the formation of the Patriotic Union of Kurdistan (PUK).

Despite the terrible hardships suffered by the Kurds as a whole, intra-Kurdish feuding did not cease following the 1974–1975 war, as KDP groups ambushed and killed PUK fighters on several occasions in 1976–1977. Talabani vowed revenge, and at various moments ordered his troops to fire upon any KDP troops – but suffered from operational weaknesses compared to the KDP. Feuding and splitting continued throughout the late 1970s, as the KDP, PUK, and KDP-I jostled for influence and funding from neighboring states.

At the commencement of the Iran–Iraq War, Saddam Hussein was able to publicly boast that "the Kurdish organizations would never be able to achieve anything since they are hopelessly divided against each other and subservient to foreign powers." In April 1981, the KDP, Iraqi Communist Party, and the newly formed Kurdish Socialist Party colluded to attack PUK positions in Erbil governorate. The following month the PUK counter-attacked, killing 50 communists and capturing another 70. Each party accused the other of being in the pocket of Baghdad, and even Ankara.

As Saddam was assured of support both financial and militarily in his war against the Islamic Republic of Iran not only from the US, but from France, Britain, and the USSR, the Kurdish groups eventually came to the realization that they must unite against the common foe (Saddam). In 1986 the KDP, PUK, KSP, and ICP announced a joint declaration calling for unity against the Ba'ath regime and in November Masoud Barzani and Jalal Talabani finally met to form an official alliance, in Tehran. By May 1987 the KPDP, Pasok, Kurdistan Toilers' Party, and the Assyrian Democratic Movement all joined what was known as the Kurdistan Front, and now all Kurdish parties were receiving monetary and military support from Iran.

With the Kurds in a seemingly stronger position than in any time since the 1960s, and their betrayal in the mind of Saddam complete, large-scale repression commenced. In Sulaymaniyah (PUK territory) Saddam rounded up 500 male children, aged 10–14, and had a substantial number of them tortured before being killed.

The KDP and PUK received advanced weaponry from Iran, such as SAM-7 missiles, that allowed them for the first time in decades to capture and hold military centers and civilian territory from the Iraqi Army. As Saddam felt increasingly threatened, he commissioned his cousin, Ali Hassan al-Majid also known as Chemical Ali for his use of chemical weapons against Kurdish towns such as Halabja, to launch the Al-Anfal campaign. Thousands of Kurdish villages were destroyed, and at least 180,000 civilians perished.

=== Gulf War and Kurdish Uprising ===
With the wholesale defeat of Iraqi forces by early 1991, unrest gathered pace in Kurdistan. Popular uprisings sprang up in Ranya, Dohuk, Sulaymaniyah, and Erbil. Masoud Barzani himself stated "The uprising came from the people themselves. We didn't expect it."

In the face of international and UN pressure, the United States, Britain, and France led Operation Provide Comfort and established the No-Fly Zones over what was to become the Kurdistan Regional Government.

=== KRG and self-rule ===
As the Iraqi Army re-took Kirkuk and the other southernmost Kurdish areas, while the American and European air forces prevented further encroachment, the KDP-PUK led Kurdistan Front was compelled to, once again, negotiate an autonomy deal with Saddam Hussein. Masoud Barzani and Jalal Talabani negotiated, and acted, as separate leaders. Barzani continued to insist upon Kirkuk, while Talabani, deeply sceptical of any of Saddam's promises, warned against signing any agreement that would not demand international recognition. This disunity weakened the Kurdish position, and Saddam preferred to deal with Barzani.

Negotiations stalled, and Saddam strengthened his position by isolating the Kurdish region, cutting off all imports and exports leading up to a harsh winter. Kurds began to demonstrate against both Saddam and the ineffectiveness of their leaders, chanting "We want bread and butter, not Saddam and not the Kurdistan Front!" Masoud Barzani stated: "Our governing process is paralyzed.... there is a crisis in the Kurdistan Front." The isolation gave the Kurdish leadership the chance to hold elections, without Baghdad's interference. Thus in May 1992, the first Kurdish democratic elections in history took place. The election campaigning had little to do with ideology, and was mostly about loyalty to either tribe or Peshmerga group (KDP or PUK). Indeed, certain factions even sold their votes to one of the two leading parties. The PUK espoused a slightly more robust form of self-government, but the results accorded basically to each party's territorial control. The KDP won 51 of the available 100 seats, with the PUK winning the remaining 49.

Despite this success, the division between the two parties was deep-seated. The KDP and Barzani loyalists were mostly from the north of the region and Bahdini-speakers, while the PUK's support was almost exclusively from the Sorani-speaking area, and based in the more progressive city of Sulaymaniyah. One veteran Kurdish politician said: "They [Barzani and Talabani] do not trust each other. If you visit one all he can do is talk about the other. They are obsessed with their party rivalry ... they do not work out any common strategy. There is not strategy at all, except to get ahead of the other party." When PUK veteran Fuad Masum was appointed prime minister, he resigned in protest of the bipolar situation. Thus the Kurdistan Region was effectively two states within a state, ruled by two different parties, armies, and security forces.

Fighting broke out in May 1994 between the KDP and the PUK, dividing Iraqi Kurdistan into two regions, with the KDP receiving support from the Iraqi government as well as Turkey and Iran. PKK fought alongside the PUK, and the United States would intervene in 1996 and negotiate a peace agreement in September 1998.

According to the Financial Times, both the KDP and PUK became wealthy recipients of Iraq's oil money transferred to them in cash by Paul Bremer.

From 2001 to 2014, the Kurdish Democratic Party was designated as a terrorist entity by the United States.

Most recently, when the Movement for Change called for the resignation of the Cabinet and the disbanding of the Kurdistan Regional Government following the 2011 Egyptian protests, the KDP responded to the accompanying protests against the Kurdistan Regional Government, by opening fire, killing two protesters and wounding several others. Later in the evening, they burnt down several buildings belonging to Movement for Change, including a TV and radio station. This has led to more demonstrations and public outrage. Both governing and opposing parties criticized the party for causing unnecessary unrest, stating that there is no need for the Kurdish government to step down. Both Amnesty International and the Human Rights Watch have urged for the protests to be allowed and for an independent investigation into the killings to be made.

== Election results ==
=== Presidential election ===
Presidential election
Election	Candidate	Votes	Result
1992	Masoud Barzani	–	–
2009	Masoud Barzani	1,266,397	69.6%

=== Parliamentary election ===
Parliamentary election
Election	Leader	Votes	%	Seats	+/–	Position	Outcome
1992	Masoud Barzani	437,879	45.3%	51 / 100	–	1st	Government
2005	Nechirvan Barzani	–	–	40 / 111	▼11	1st	Government
2009	Nechirvan Barzani	–	–	30 / 111	▼10	1st	Government
2013	Nechirvan Barzani	743,984	37.8%	38 / 111	▲8	1st	Government
2018	Nechirvan Barzani	688,070	44.1%	45 / 111	▲7	1st	Government
2024	Nechirvan Barzani	809,197	43.15%	39 / 100	▼6	1st	Government

=== Governorate election ===
Governorate election
Election	Leader	Votes	%	Seats	+/–	Position	Outcome
2005	Masoud Barzani	741,483	42.1%	61 / 123	–	2nd	Government
2014	Masoud Barzani	816,654	37.8%	34 / 90	▼27	▲1st	Government

== Political leaders ==
=== Party leaders ===
Image	Year	Name	Period	Time in office
	1946	Mustafa Barzani	1946–1979	33 years
	1979	Masoud Barzani	1979–present	Incumbent

== Branches ==
Kurdistan Democratic Party was established on August 16, 1946, under the leadership of Mustafa Barzani. The leadership and organisational structure of the party is as follows:

- President
- Vice President
- Political Bureau
- Central Committee

The structure and party administration is divided into regions or branches known as "Liq", districts as "Nawçe", local organisations as "Řekxiraw" and cells as "Şane". Each Liq is subdivided into Nawçe; Nawçe into Řekxiraw and Řekxiraw into Şanes.

- 1st Branch – Duhok
- 2nd Branch – Hewlêr
- 3rd Branch – Kerkûk
- 4th Branch – Silêmanî
- 5th Branch – Baghdad
- 6th Branch – Europe (London)
- 7th Branch – Northern America (Washington D.C.)
- 9th Branch – Akrê
- 10th Branch – Soran (Rewanduz region)
- 11th Branch – Ranye/ Qeladiza
- 12th Branch – Helebce
- 14th Branch – Mosul
- 15th Branch – Xaneqîn
- 16th Branch – Hewlêr-Şaweys
- 17th Branch – Şingal
- 18th Branch – Amêdî
- 19th Branch – Çemçemal
- 20th Branch – Şêxan
- 21st Branch – Tasluce, Silêmanî
- 22nd Branch – Germiyan-Kelar
- 23rd Branch – Mexmûr
- 24th Branch – Şeqlawe
- 26th Branch – Balekayetî-Çoman

Members of Political Bureau or Central Committee head each branch. Other members are elected at branch and district conferences.

== Congresses ==
=== First Congress ===
The first congress of the party convened in Baghdad in 1946, thanks to Barzani's initiative in the aftermath of the Republic of Mahabad Indeed, the peculiar circumstances of the Kurdish people necessitated the existence of a patriotic, nationalist and democratic party capable of leading the movement of the Kurds. At this congress, the party's statute was formulated and Barzani was elected the first president of the party.

=== Second Congress ===
The Second Congress convened in Baghdad in March 1951 at a time when some of the party's leadership members had been arrested by the Iraqi regime and the party members were subjected to arrest and chasing under martial laws and the party ranks were beginning to disintegrate.

=== Third Congress ===
The Third Congress convened in Kirkuk on January 26, 1953, with the view of reinforcing the party ranks. It was in this congress that the party's name was changed from the Kurdish Democratic Party into the Kurdistan Democratic Party. It was also decided to form a number of Kurdish popular and professional organisations, and the name of the party's organ was changed from Rizgari to Khebat.

=== Fourth Congress ===
This congress convened in Baghdad, October 4–7, 1959 following the demise of the Iraqi Monarchy amidst considerable political freedom. Mustafa Barzani and his comrades had already returned home from the Soviet exile. This Congress is considered to be one of the most important congresses of the KDP and the first one to be attended by Barzani. In this congress, the KDP was able to rid itself of the ideological conflicts and adopt a nationalist and progressive position.

=== Fifth Congress ===
The Fifth Congress convened at the KDP's Headquarter in Baghdad in early May 1960. It convened following the announcement of the political parties' law. This was the first time for the KDP to be officially permitted to conduct its activities publicly and legally.

=== Sixth Congress ===
This congress convened in Qala Diza in early July 1964. It was devoted to the conflicts, within the leadership, brought about by the negotiations that had taken place between the Kurdish movement and the Iraqi regime. Representatives from the Ahmad-Talabani faction were arrested on arrival.

=== Seventh Congress ===
The Seventh Congress convened in Galala on November 15, 1966, in the wake of June 29 agreement. The KDP seized the chance to further unify its ranks

=== Eighth Congress ===
This congress convened in Naw Pirdan on July 1, 1970, almost four months after March 11 Agreement with the objective of enhancing the ranks of the party, the people of Kurdistan and that of Iraqi people as whole. This congress is considered to be a very important one with regard to organisation, maximum attendance by party members, guests, friends of the party and the Kurdish people as well as realisation of the congressional objectives.

=== Ninth Congress ===
This congress convened on the Iraqi–Iranian–Turkish borders, December 4–13, 1979. It was the first congress after the death of its leader Mustafa Barzani. It was also the first congress after the 1975 conspiracy. The congress was considerably successful in reorganising the parties ranks and re-establishment of the May Revolution institutions. It was in this congress that Masoud Barzani was elected the chairman of the KDP; in his words, "this was the most difficult and burdensome congress". Sami Abd al Rahman and other intellectuals began to dissociate themselves from the party, dissatisfied with the traditionalism implicit in Barzani leadership and its supporters, and by the close ties forged by Idris Barzani and the Khomeini regime.

=== Tenth Congress ===
This congress of the KDP convened in the district of Margewer, December 12–17, 1989. It was in the aftermath of the well documented barbaric chemical attacks against the Kurds and the Anfal operations by the Iraqi regime resulting in the annihilation of tens of thousands of helpless people, displacement and deportation of a similar number of innocent civilians with devastation of more than 4.500 Kurdish villages and townships. In this congress heavy emphasis was laid on unifying the party ranks, and consolidating the Kurdistan Front and popular unity.

=== Eleventh Congress ===
This congress was convened in Erbil on August 16, 1993, against the background of new and rapid developments in Kurdish politics and the region. Over two-thirds of the Kurdistan Region was controlled by the Kurds and an elected Kurdish National Assembly with a regional government was running the affairs of Kurds. In the 11th Congress, a number of other political parties reunited with the KDP and further consolidated and strengthened the party's position amongst the Kurdish nation.

=== Twelfth Congress ===
This congress was convened in Erbil from October 6 to October 13 and held against a background of several years of internal conflicts and KDP's leading role in the third cabinet of the regional government. The developments in the region and the world all contributed to KDP's new outlook and approaches to international and regional politics. New figures and fresh blood were introduced into the new leadership through a democratic election of Central Committee.

=== Thirteenth Congress ===
The party's 13th congress was held in December 2010 in Erbil, capital of Kurdistan, under the banner of Renewal, Justice and Coexistence. The congress re-elected Masoud Barzani as president of the party and welcomed the appointment of Nechirvan Barzani as vice president.

== See also ==
- 2020 storming of the Kurdistan Democratic Party headquarters

== Literature ==
- McDowall, David (2004). A modern history of the Kurds (3rd ed.). London: I.B. Tauris. ISBN 1-85043-416-6.
- Gürbey, Gülistan; Hofmann, Sabine; Seyder, Ferhad Ibrahim (2017). Between State and Non-State: Politics and Society in Kurdistan-Iraq and Palestine. Springer. ISBN 9781137601810.
- Entessar, N. (2010). Kurdish Politics in the Middle East. Lexington Books. ISBN 978-0-7391-4039-0.
