= 2019–2021 Iraqi protests =

Protests over corruption, unemployment and foreign influence

2019–2021 Iraqi uprising
- Part of the Second Arab Spring and Iraqi conflict
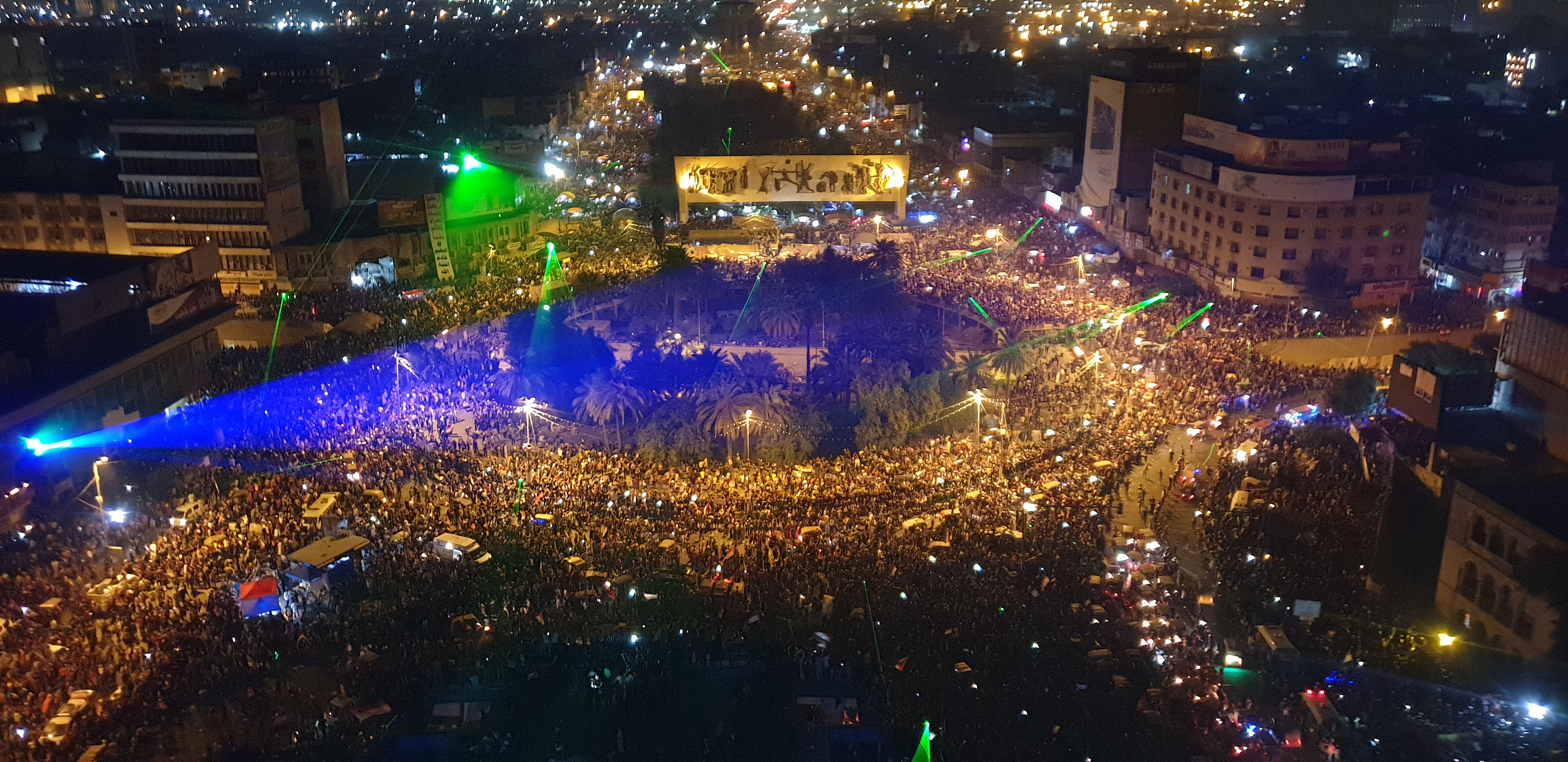
- Protest in Baghdad in November 2019
- Date: 1 October 2019 – Early 2020 (occasional protests until 5 November 2021)
- Location: Iraq
- Caused by: Rise of Iraqi nationalism; State corruption; Muhasasa quota agreements; Anti-American sentiment; Anti-Iranian sentiment; Unemployment; Low wages; Poor public services
- Goals: Secularism; End of foreign interventions in Iraqi affairs; Improved government services; Improved standard of living
- Methods: Demonstrations; Strike action; Internet activism; Sit-ins; Civil resistance; Barricades
- Result: Resignation of Prime Minister Adil Abdul-Mahdi; Mustafa Al-Kadhimi appointed as Prime Minister; Elections brought forward to 2021; Council of Representatives passes a new election law

Parties
(Iraq) Iraqi protesters; Supported by: Iraqi Communist Party	Iraqi Government; Iraqi Police; Popular Mobilization Forces; Kata'ib Hezbollah; Badr Organization; Asa'ib Ahl al-Haq; Hezbollah al-Nujaba; Kata'ib al-Imam Ali; Hezbollah Movement in Iraq; Team Media War; Islamic Dawa Party; Islamic Supreme Council of Iraq

Lead figures
No centralized leadership	Barham Salih (President of Iraq); Mohammed Al-Halbousi (Speaker of the Iraqi Parliament); Adil Abdul-Mahdi (Former Prime Minister of Iraq); Juma Inad (Minister of Defence); Najah al-Shammari (Former Minister of Defence); Falih Al-Fayyadh (Advisor of the National Security Council); Mohanad Najim Aleqabi (Director-General of Team Media War); Nouri al-Maliki (Head of Islamic Dawa Party); Humam Hamoudi (Head of Islamic Supreme Council of Iraq); Abu Mahdi al-Muhandis † (Deputy Chairman of the PMF); Abu Zainab Al-Lami (Security Director of the PMF); Hadi Al-Amiri (Commander of the Badr Organization); Qais Al-Khazali (Commander of Asa'ib Ahl al-Haq)

Casualties
- Deaths: 600–1,100
- Injuries: 25,000–30,000
- Arrested: 4,600
- Casualties data: 13 January 2020, per Iraqi Warcrimes Documentation Center

A series of demonstrations, marches, sit-ins and civil disobedience took place in Iraq from 2019 until 2021. It started on 1 October 2019, a date which was set by civil activists on social media, spreading mainly over the central and southern provinces of Iraq, to protest corruption, high unemployment, political sectarianism, inefficient public services and foreign interventionism. Protests spread quickly, coordinated over social media, to other provinces in Iraq. As the intensity of the demonstrations peaked in late October, protesters' anger focused not only on the desire for a complete overhaul of the Iraqi government but also on driving out Iranian influence, including Iranian-aligned Shia militias. The government, with the help of Iranian-backed militias responded brutally using live bullets, marksmen, hot water, hot pepper gas and tear gas against protesters, leading to many deaths and injuries.

The protesters called for the end of the muhasasa system, existing since the first post-Saddam sovereign Iraqi government in 2006, in which government positions are being parceled out to the (presumed) ethnic or sectarian communities in Iraq like Shia, Sunni and Kurds, based on their presumed size, purportedly leading to incompetent and corrupt politics. The protests, which were the largest of their kind in Iraq since the 2003 American invasion, became known within Iraq as the October Revolution (Arabic: ثورة تشرين, romanized: Thawrat Tishrīn), and gave rise to the October Protest Movement. Some called it the Tuk-Tuk Revolution, because protesters resisted in tuk-tuks.

== Background ==
In 2011, protests broke out in various provinces within Iraq demanding the end of corruption, nepotism, and unemployment, while also calling for increased wages and improved public services such as electricity, transportation, health care, education and municipal services. Protestors faced government suppression, police brutality and arrests. These reform demands in the six Sunni-dominant provinces escalated during the 2012–2013 Iraqi protests after Nouri al-Maliki's acts of persecution against Sunni political figures. This, in turn, led to protests calling for the overthrow of the sectarian government and redrafting the constitution, as well as a march into Baghdad to occupy the Green Zone. These protests were faced with even more government suppression, leading to clashes between security forces and local tribesmen who had alleged support from Ba'ath Party loyalists. After reports of the Sunni factions, which were part of the Iraqi insurgency against the American occupation, unifying their powers and taking control over Al Anbar Governorate, the government launched the 2013 Anbar campaign. By July 2014, these factions which merged with ISIL had occupied most of Al-Anbar, Ninawa, Salah ad-Din, Kirkuk and Diyala which ignited the War in Iraq (2013–2017). The U.S. Secretary of State pledged "intense" support to the Iraqi government while imploring the Government to rise above "sectarian motivations" but according to senior officials in the Department of Defense the U.S. was refraining from giving weapons to the Iraqi military "because of lack of confidence in Iraqi troops", while veteran U.S. journalists familiar with the situation claimed that Iraqi Prime Minister Nuri al-Maliki "is not the answer and should step down".

Fueled by the lack of progress of Haider al-Abadi's government and state corruption, the leader of the Sadrist Movement, Muqtada al-Sadr, called for a sit-in within the Green Zone in Baghdad to force the government to find serious solutions for corruption. On 30 April 2016, thousands of Al-Sadr's followers breached the barricades of the Green Zone and stormed into governmental buildings, including the Iraqi parliament, chasing representatives out of the Green Zone before retreating the day after by the call of Al-Sadr. Another demonstration broke out in Basra and nearby cities in July 2018 due to deteriorating public utilities, water contamination and lack of electricity and continued for a few months. Protestors burned down a number of government buildings and parties' headquarters, blocked numerous main streets, tore and burned pictures of Khomeini and Khamenei and even occupied the Al-Najaf and Basra International Airports. They were faced with live bullets from security forces causing the death of at least 16 protestors.

Remembering the rise of ISIS during the protests in 2012, these ones avoided sectarian rhetoric. Foreign intervention by the U.S. and Iran fuelled public anger, in a 2019 poll found that only 22% of Iraqis had a favorable opinion of the United States, 85% viewed the purpose of the 2003 invasion was to divide and plunder Iraq, while 16% had a favorable opinion of Iran.

== Prelude ==
On 20 June in Basra demonstrators gathered outside the city's new administrative headquarters to vent their anger about poor basic services and unemployment. The old headquarters were burnt down during 2018's months-long protest. Basra and the surrounding region produce about 90 percent of the country's oil wealth but most of its residents have not benefited from it. Protesters blamed Basra's authorities for the city's problems, from a lack of job opportunities to unreliable and poor public utilities. Riot police were deployed at the scene but the protest remained peaceful.

=== Holders of higher degrees demonstrations ===
On 25 September 2019, a group of holders of higher degrees organized a protest in front of the Prime Minister's office in Baghdad, demanding their employment. The protest was faced with major suppression from security forces as armoured vehicles separated the demonstrators using hot water and police forces conducted random arrests among them which led to cases of fainting and injuries among the demonstrators. This incident was faced with country-wide anger because of the forceful methods that were used by the government towards intellectual demonstrators, along with the violence that was used against female protestors. Reactions included the Ministry of Interior forming a committee to investigate the incident and demonstrators organizing solidarity protests in many provinces to condemn these methods. The holders of higher degrees resumed their protests for three days after the incident, spreading over many southern provinces.

=== Dismissal of Abdel-Wahab Al-Saedi ===
On 27 September 2019, Iraqi Prime Minister Adil Abdul-Mahdi issued a decision to transfer Abdel-Wahab Al-Saedi, a Lieutenant General at the time, from ICTS to the Ministry of Defence. Al-Saedi said the decision was an insult to his military rank and that he would rather go to jail than execute this decision. This decision caused political figures, including former prime minister Haider al-Abadi and many representatives, to criticize Abdul-Mahdi and call for him to back down from his decisions. According to VOA News, Al Saedi's transfer was influenced individually by pro-Iran factions within the Al-Shaabi paramilitary force, said a government official in Iraq who asked to be kept unknown. After the decision was made, social media was flooded with Al-Saedi's photos and achievements, calling for Abdul-Mahdi to back down from this injustice and accusing Iran of ordering the Iraqi government to replace every "national hero" in the army with Iranian loyalists. In response to this backlash, Abdul-Mahdi said he stands by his decision and that it is a normal routine decision with no political motivations. Furthermore, after calls for the unveiling of a statue of Al-Saedi in Mosul that was made to immortalize the commander's efforts in the city's liberation, security forces surrounded the statue, prohibiting its unveiling, before it was finally removed by them. On 30 September 2019, Al-Saedi announced that he executed Abdul-Mahdi's orders and joined the ministry of defence as "a loyal soldier to serve my country and my beloved people."

== Causes, goals and methods ==
Starting on 25 October 2019, mass protests took place in many cities in Iraq, against corruption and a national government that protestors saw as unaccountable for its actions. After the U.S. occupation (2003–11), oligarchs and warlords were perceived to have taken control over Iraq. While the country produces more oil than the United Arab Emirates, the oil revenues were seen by protestors as failing to be spent on maintenance of hospitals and roads. A widely used slogan in this phase of the protests was: "We want a homeland"—reflecting a longing both for a sense of unity and for a self-determined life in dignity.

While at daytime protesters from all strata of Iraqi society peacefully took to the streets and squares of cities like Kerbala, later at night, youths from the suburbs sought violent confrontations, using molotov cocktails and burning car-tires, which was answered by the state security forces with tear gas, rubber bullets, deadly snipers and even patrol vehicles lethally ramming into crowds.

=== Assassination and intimidation campaign ===
Hassan Wahab of the Amal Association human rights group said, "Those [protestors] detained and released are only released on bail. Charges are not dropped so they face re-arrest and trial."

As of 23 December 2019, there were 29 assassinated activists related to the protests, most of them were in Baghdad. On 10 January 2020, an Iraqi journalist, Ahmad Abdelsamad, of Dijlah TV and his cameraman, Safaa Ghali, were shot in their car by unidentified gunmen.

On 21 January, the police stated that Janat Madhi, a 49-year old activist was gunned down by unknown gunmen as she came back home from protests in the southern city of Basra, according to the Urdu Point.

On 14 August, an activist, Tahseen Osama Al-Shahmani, was shot 20 times at his internet service company in Basra. On 19 August, a female activist, Reham Yacoub, was killed and three others were wounded in the city of Basra, when unidentified gunmen opened fire on their car.

=== Attack on the US Embassy in Baghdad ===
The US Embassy in Baghdad was attacked on the last day of 2019. The attack was organized and directed by Iran's proxy leaders Abu Mahdi al-Muhandis, Qais al-Khazali, Hadi al-Amari, and Falih Al-Fayyadh. They are seen in the pictures taken on the scene.

Abu Mahdi al-Muhandis, one of the leaders of the attack on the US Embassy in Baghdad, was condemned and spent years in jail in Kuwait for directing the December 1983 attacks on the US and French embassies there.

For a long time, Iraqi anti-government protestors tried to enter Green Zone and were brutally suppressed and held back. On 31 December, groups of Popular Mobilization Forces (al-Hashd al-Sha'abi) entered the Green Zone and went directly toward the American Embassy without being blocked by security forces.

US President Donald Trump accused Iran of "orchestrating" the attack on the embassy and added that they would be held "fully responsible". In the aftermath, the commander of Iran's Quds Force, Major General Qasem Soleimani, and Abu Mahdi al-Muhandis were tracked down and assassinated in a U.S. drone strike near Baghdad International Airport. On 5 January in reaction to these airstrikes the Iraqi parliament called for the expulsion of US troops from the country.

== Timeline 2019 ==
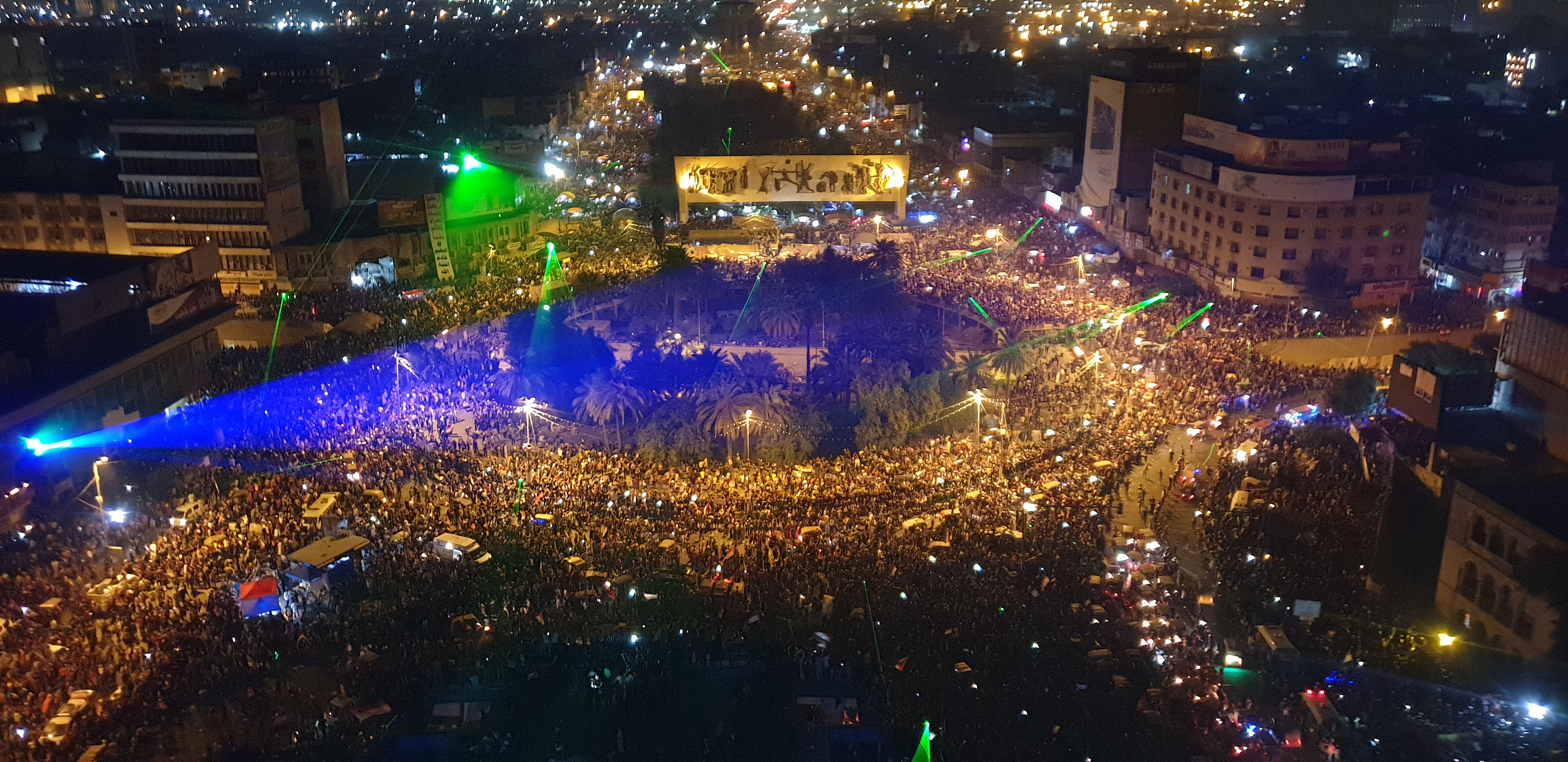
The image shows crowds of people in Tahrir Square, Baghdad, from the top of the building where the restaurant is located on 1 November 2019.

=== October ===
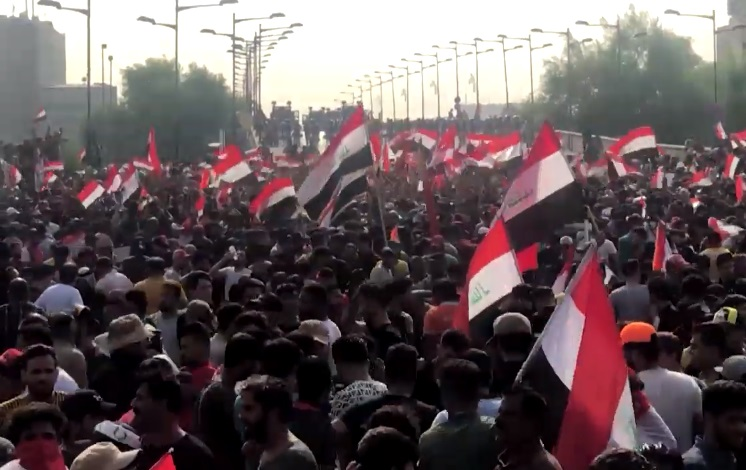
Protesters in Baghdad on 1 October

1 October: Protests erupted in Baghdad in Liberation Square over high unemployment, poor basic services, and state corruption. These protests spread to the southern provinces. The authorities imposed an internet blackout and shut down 75% of the country's internet access. Protesters demanded the resignation of Adil Abdul-Mahdi and prepare for early elections. The protesters also began demonstrating against Iranian influence, and against the leader of Quds Force, Qasem Soleimani. At the beginning of the protests, the demonstrators were mostly young male, holding the government responsible for its many failures, according to Vox. The Iraqi prime minister declared a curfew until further notice.

3 October: According to Amnesty International, 18 civilians and one police officer were killed and hundreds were injured after three days of protesting.

4 October: In Nasiriyah, many headquarters of political parties were burned down.

5 October: Unknown forces raided many TV channels such as Al Arabiya, Dijlah TV, NRT and Al Rasheed TV for airing the protests. The forces destroyed these channels' properties.

7 October: Dozens of protesters were killed and hundreds were injured in Sadr City.

8 October: Protests largely ceased due to Arba'een, a Shia religious holiday which occurred on 19 October. According to Arab News, regardless of warnings from the Iranian authorities for the pilgrims to procrastinate going on the pilgrimage to Iraq, 3.5 million Shiites, mainly Iranians entered Iraq through land borders on Friday.

24 October: Thousands of protesters began to congregate at Liberation Square in Baghdad, protesting against the government and against the Iranian influence. Nearly 50 protesters were killed and injured after attempting to enter the Green Zone.

25 October: Protesting in Maysan Governorate began to turn into riots between Peace Companies led by Muqtada al-Sadr on one side and Asa'ib Ahl al-Haq and Badr Organization on another. Asa'ib Ahl al-Haq member Wisam Alyawi and his brother, both PMU commanders for the Maysan Governorate, were lynched by angry protesters who dragged them out of an ambulance and beat them to death. Qais Khazali, chief of all Asa'ib Ahl al-Haq, announced that nine PMU members had been killed in the recent protests, blamed Israel for their deaths, and stated he would take revenge "four times over." Protesters burned down and destroyed many offices of political parties in the city of Samawah. Protesters in Karbala chanted against Iran, tearing up Ali Khamenei's pictures. They also attacked the Governorate Council building. They also burnt the Iranian consulate. In Al-Qādisiyyah Governorate, protesters burned down the Governorate Council building. Administrative authorities declared a curfew in the province. In the city of Al Kūt, protesters attacked many of the political parties' offices and also attacked the house of former Minister of Interior, Qasim al-Araji.

26 October: 7 protesters were killed and 28 wounded after conflicts between Badr Organization and protesters in city of Hillah in Babil Governorate. The seven protesters died when members of the Badr organization opened fire at protesters assembled in front of their office, according to The Guardian.

28 October: A top security authority for Baghdad declared an open-ended curfew on the capital, four days after the renewed protests against government killed more than 70 protesters. In Karbala, 14–30 people were killed in protests. Government officials denied any deaths occurred.

30 October: Iranian military officer Qasem Soleimani met with Hadi al-Amiri, one of Abdul-Mahdi's political opponents, and asked him to support Abdul-Mahdi.

31 October: President Barham Salih said in a televised address that the Prime Minister had agreed to resign, "on the condition that a successor is agreed to replace him."

=== November ===
2 November: Protesters blocked Iraq's main port Umm Qasr. Oil exports from offshore platforms were not affected, but imports of staple food were. Iraq is heavily dependent on food import.

3 November: Protestors stormed the Iranian consulate in Karbala, where they set fires around the building and replaced the Iranian flag with an Iraqi one. According to Reuters, 3 protesters were killed when Iraqi security forces fired live ammunition at protesters gathered outside the Iranian consulate. However, the BBC was led to believe that the source of the gunfire was anonymous and it was aimed at both the security forces and protesters.

4 November: An internet blockage observatory, NetBlocks, highlighted that the internet access in Baghdad and five other regions in Iraq were cut off on 4 November, in wake of the continued rage in the country. Netblocks added that the new internet shut down is currently perceived to be the most extreme shut down experienced in Iraq. Iraqi authorities had taken a similar move in October, where social media and messaging remained highly restricted in several parts of the country.

8 November: Grand Ayatollah Ali al-Sistani, Iraq's most influential Shia cleric, called on the government to meet the demands of the protesters, and urged the security forces to avoid the use of violence.

10 November: The Iraqi Parliamentary Human Rights Committee reported that at least 319 people had been killed during the protests. According to the Independent High Commission for Human Rights of Iraq, an additional 15,000 were injured.

13 November: The Iraqi Parliament held a special session to discuss the crisis. Jeanine Hennis-Plasschaert of the United Nations Assistance Mission for Iraq addressed the session to present her plan to resolve the crisis, which involves election reform and anti-corruption measures.

14 November: Four people were killed and 62 injured in Baghdad in clashes between security forces and protesters.

16 November: At least four protesters were killed and nearly 20 were injured as a car bomb attack took place at the Tahrir Square in Baghdad. No group claimed responsibility of the first explosion in the ongoing anti-government protests.

17 November: Documents leaked by The Intercept revealed details of Iranian influence inside Iraq. The Intercept was said to have received the documents from an unknown source and has since been unable to identify, according to The Guardian.

19 November: Protesters blocked the entrance to the country's second largest commercial port, Khor al-Zubair port, halting the trade activity for oil and other tankers. Prior to that, the access to Umm Qasr Port was also cut off.

21 November: Al-Jazeera reported that at least seven protesters were killed and 78 wounded by security forces in Baghdad.

24 November: At least two protesters were shot dead in the southern city of Nasiriyah, as they shut down schools and blocked the Zaitoun and the Nasr bridges into the city center. Nearly 47 people were also wounded during the clashes with security forces.

27 November: Protestors attacked the Iranian consulate in Najaf for the second time, this time burning it down. Security forces fired tear gas into the crowd and injured some of them but had to escape when hundreds of protesters poured into the consulate and set it on fire.

29 November: 44 protestors were killed in southern Iraq. The prime minister announced his pending resignation on the same day.

=== December ===
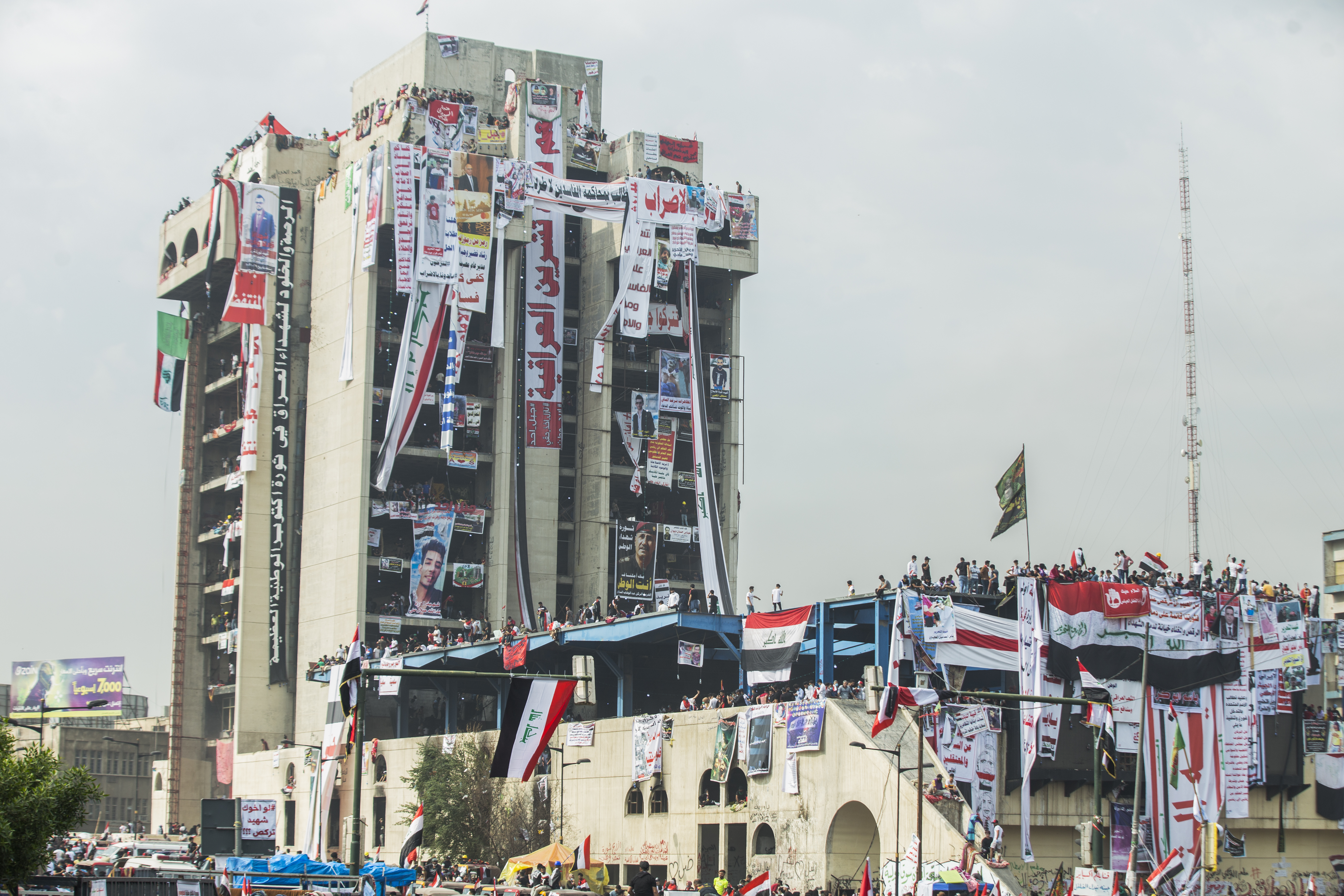
Protesters occupy the unfinished Turkish restaurant building in Baghdad

1 December: Despite the resignation of Prime Minister Adel Abdel Mahdi, demonstrators in the Shi'ite populated city of Najaf set fire to the Iranian consulate, for the second time in a week. According to the BBC, reports showed that staff at the Iranian consulate were able to escape immediately before the demonstrators stormed the consulate. A police official said that when the police fired shots with live ammunition in order to stop the protesters from breaking into the consulate, one protester was killed and a minimum of 35 people were injured, according to Al Jazeera.

6 December: Unidentified gunmen in vehicles opened fire on protesters in Baghdad's al-Khilani Square, killing 25 (including three police officers) and injuring around 130 others. The attacks were said to have followed a day after a string of suspicious stabbings in Baghdad's Tahrir Square, leaving at least 15 wounded, according to the guardian. According to Aljazeera, some protesters blamed the Iraqi government of conspiring with the gunmen, indicating to a power outage that coincided with the time of the attacks.

8 December: An Iraqi civil activist, Fahim al-Ta'i was assassinated by unknown gunmen on motorcycle outside al-Ansar Hotel in the Baroudi area of Karbala.

12 December: A 16-year-old boy – falsely accused of shooting protestors – was dragged along the ground and lynched by protestors after security forces withdrew. The boy's deceased body was de-clothed apart from his underpants and was later hung from a traffic light. It was later removed by his family and taken to a forensic morgue.

Muqtada al-Sadr's group stated that it would withdraw its "blue helmets" support for the protests unless the "terrorists responsible" for the lynching were identified. A protestor's group described the lynching as "a Machiavellian plan aimed at tarnishing the reputation of the peaceful protesters" and that the protestors "had nothing to do with" the lynching event.

24 December: The Council of Representatives passed a series of electoral laws to placate protestors. The laws transitioned elections to a single non-transferable vote system, which allowed voters to select individuals rather than use party lists, while the candidates would represent electoral districts rather than provinces. The new electoral law is expected to have representatives represent more local voices, as opposed to the entire governorate they were previously elected from, as well as stop infighting amongst list members and a myriad of small lists from siphoning off votes and failing to meet the electoral threshold. It would also prevent parties from running on unified lists, which had previously led some to easily sweep all the seats in a particular governorate. However, minority groups might end up being less represented, as they now have to obtain a plurality in the district they are running in, and the number of seats might not accurately reflect overall popular support. The Washington Institute for Near East Policy had previously endorsed this approach, although the Al-Bayan Center for Planning and Studies, an independent non-profit think tank in Baghdad, had proposed instead retaining the proportional system, but creating more districts so that each elected between three and eight seats each, which would retain the proportional aspect of seat allocation while binding representatives to more local areas. Most Kurdish legislators boycotted the meeting of the council, in opposition to changing the law. After its passage, legal experts, intellectuals, and some protestors suggested that the law as written might not work as intended, as there has not been a census to count population for the purpose of drawing districts in over two decades, and the parties might end up running candidates individually but then re-form parliamentary groups once the Council sits, effectively returning to the status quo. The new law apportions for the legislature to be shrunk to 251 seats (down from 329), says that the districts that are to be created must consist of over 100,000 people, and reduced the age of eligibility for candidacy to 25 from 30. One-quarter of seats would be reserved for women, and 9 would be reserved for national religious minorities. The law also established the Independent High Electoral Commission, which is to be composed of nine members, seven of whom would be judges from regular courts. In addition, there are two other judges from the State Council (administrative court).

26 December: President Barham Salih submits a letter of resignation after refusing to appoint Asaad Al Eidani as Prime Minister following the resignation of Adil Abdul-Mahdi. Salih stated that Al Eidani would not be approved by the demonstrators. President Salih added that since the constitution voids him of the right to refuse a nomination, he prefers to step down instead of accepting the nomination of a new prime minister that the protesters would reject.

29 December: The US bombarded Kata'ib Hezbollah positions in Iraq, killing 25 members of those Kataib forces and injuring 51 others.

31 December: Hundreds of anti-American protesters surrounded the US embassy in Baghdad in the Green Zone of the city where embassies and government buildings are concentrated, in protest over the US airstrikes in Iraq, two days earlier. Protesters elsewhere in Baghdad's Tahrir Square stated: "demonstrations at the US embassy are a natural response to the US strikes over Hashd positions in Iraq". However, they condemned the attack on the U.S. embassy by Iraqi supporters of the Hashd group saying, "we are staying here in the hub of the peaceful protest movement " and added that the "crowds in the Green Zone do not represent us. We want peaceful change." Rumors speculated that on that day, some protesters had broken into the US embassy compound. However, sometime later the US Department of State announced that protesters had not entered the actual embassy building in Baghdad and that the US ambassador was still at his post.

== Timeline 2020 ==
=== January ===
4 January: A funeral procession for Abu Mahdi al-Muhandis and Soleimani was held in Baghdad with thousands of mourners in attendance, waving Iraqi and PMF flags and chanting "No to America, ". The procession started at al-Kadhimiya Mosque in Baghdad. Iraq's prime minister, Adil Abdul-Mahdi, and leaders of the PMF attended the funeral procession. They were taken to the holy Shia cities of Najaf and Karbala were held funeral prayers on them.

5 January: Following the 3 January assassination by the United States (US) of Iranian major general Qasem Soleimani and of the head of the Popular Mobilization Forces (PMF) Abu Mahdi al-Muhandis, protests continued in Nassiriyah, Dewaniya, Kut, Amarah, Karbala and Baghdad with a deliberate shift to protesting against both the Iranian and US roles in Iraq. Earlier protests tended to mostly oppose Iranian influence in Iraq. The earlier slogan "Out, out Iran" was replaced by "No to Iran, no to America". Protestors in Basra and Nassiriyah blocked symbolic funeral processions for Soleimani and al-Muhandis. In Nasiriyah, protesters clashed with a funeral procession in honor of Abu Mahdi al-Muhandis. The local headquarters of the PMF was set alight and protestors in Najaf burnt tires and blocked main roads to protest against Iran. In reaction to the airstrikes, the Iraqi parliament called for the expulsion of US troops from the country.

7 January After holding funeral processions across Iran, Iranian Supreme Leader Ali Khamenei held funeral prayers among hundreds of thousands of people and crying in front of the Iraqi flag-draped coffin for the deceased. Abu Mahdi al-Muhandis' body was returned to Iraq and transferred to his hometown of Basra. His burial was delayed because of the huge crowd at the funeral. On 8 January, al-Muhandis was buried in Iraq's Najaf where hundreds of mourners gathered to pay their final respects. Funeral processions were also held in several Iraqi cities prior to Najaf, including Baghdad and Karbala.

12 January: Hundreds of Iraqis in Basra mourned the death of the correspondent for local television station al-Dijla, Ahmad Abdessamad, and his cameraman Safaa Ghali. A mourner stated that the attack was obviously an attempt to keep people silent, France 24 reported. Iraq's Ministry of Interior invited journalists to a conference in Basra, in order to discuss the killings, as well as the security conditions of the city. However, the ministry was left with no choice but to cancel the conference because journalists refused to attend.

17 January: At least two people were killed and dozens injured after the security forces fire upon protesters at al-Sinak bridge in central Baghdad. In the southern city of Najaf, Iraqi protesters attacked the Kata'ib Hezbollah militia's center and set it afire. Next day protestors continued by burning posters of Qasem Soleimani.

20 January: Four protesters and two police officers were killed in fresh clashes in Baghdad. Medical sources disclosed that over 50 people were injured, according to Arab News. Iraqi security forces reportedly fired tear gas and threw stun grenades, in response to the petrol bombs thrown at them by protesters in Baghdad's Tayaran Square. In the southern parts of Iraq however, hundreds of protesters in Karbala, Amara and Nasiriyah shut down major roads and burned tyres. The protesters maintained that Prime Minister Adel Abdul Mahdi has failed in nominating a new government that would be welcomed by Iraqis, among several other promises.

On 21 January, Iraqi police confirmed that three Katyusha rockets landed inside the fortified Green Zone housing government buildings and foreign delegations in Baghdad. The rockets were launched from the Zafaraniyah district outside Baghdad. No group has claimed responsibility for the attack, although Iranian-backed militias have been accused by the US of carrying out similar attacks on the Green Zone over the past few months.

22 January: Iraq's High Commission for Human Rights announced that at least 10 people have been killed in the violent unrest across the country within the last two days, Al Jazeera reported. Iraq's President Barham Salih, attended a meeting with US President Donald Trump at Davos 22 January, where they discussed the strategic foreign relations between Iraq and the US, which was perceived by Iran-backed militias as a clear indication that Salih wants the US military to remain in Iraq, despite warning him not to meet with Trump.

23 January: Amnesty International warned that Iraqi security forces have continued their series of operations involving the use of deadly violence against peaceful protesters, based on substantiating video analysis and eyewitness reports confirmed by the organization. According to the San Diego Union-Tribune, at least 8 people were believed to have been wounded when security forces used tear gas to disperse protesters on the Mohammed al-Qassim Highway.

24 January: Shia leader Muqtada al-Sadr; alongside Pro-PMF leaders' call for a "million-man" march was answered, as hundreds of thousands of Iraqis marched to the streets demanding the withdrawal of US troops from Iraq. The Green zone which houses the US embassy alongside the path of the march was heavily surrounded by security forces, CNN added. According to the BBC, among those protesting in the city of Baghdad are Iranian-backed militias, with many others carrying Iraq's national flags and placards criticizing the presence of US troops in the country.

According to the Guardian, a statement by the influential Shia cleric Moqtada al-Sadr was read out by his representative on the stage at the place of the protest, calling for the closure of Iraqi airspace to US military and surveillance aircraft, the annulment of Iraqi's security agreement with the US, as well as the departure of all foreign forces from the country, and so on. A rough estimate suggested that the turnout of the protesters had reached 2.5 million.

25 January: Iraqi security forces raided a protest site in Baghdad and tried to remove protesters in southern cities, firing tear gas and live bullets, killing four and wounding dozens more. The raid came after Muqtada al-Sadr ordered his followers to withdraw. It was reported that al-Sadr's followers packed up their tents and departed the camps after the withdrawal of his support. The withdrawal of Iraq's Sadrists in their support for the anti-government protest movement has left many pondering, as to whether a government crackdown will follow.

26 January: In Baghdad rockets hit the United States embassy wounding at least one. One rocket was said to hit the embassy cafeteria, while two other rockets landed nearby, a security source was cited as saying by the AFP news agency. According to CNN, the wounded individual sustained a minor injury and had already resumed duty, a US official added. The Independent High Commission for Human Rights of Iraq stated that over the last three days, 9 protesters were killed in Baghdad and 3 others in Nasiriyah in the Iraqi protests, leaving 230 others wounded.

27 January: In the city of Nasiriyah, south of Iraq, security forces opened fire at a crowd of anti-government protesters and killed one person. US Secretary of State Mike Pompeo called on Iraqi PM Abdul Mahdi to uphold Iraq's sovereignty in light of attacks from Iran on US facilities in Iraq, including the rocket attacks against the US embassy in Baghdad the day before.

31 January: the Human Rights Watch urged the Iraqi authorities to investigate unlawful use of force and all killings at the hands of security forces, with the aid of international experts if need be. On Friday, security forces fired tear gas to disperse the crowd at Baghdad's Khilani and Wathba squares, leaving at least 11 protesters injured, medical and security officials stated.

=== February ===
1 February: Iraq's President Barham Salih, appointed a former minister of communications, Mohammed Tawfiq Allawi, as the country's new prime minister. However, anti-government protesters promptly rejected the appointment of Mohammed Allawi as the new prime-minister designate, by holding rallies in Baghdad, as well as in cities across the country's southern provinces. Later in the evening, in an address to Iraqis on state television, Allawi pledged to form a representative government, hold early parliamentary elections, ensure justice for the unlawful acts against protesters, among all other claims by the protesters.

2 February: Protesters who were against Allawi's nomination started grouping their tents together away from the tents occupied by Sadrists in Baghdad's Tahir square.

3 February: Al Jazeera reported that since the onset of the protests, the death toll is now believed to have reached 536, alongside 13 members of the security forces, as announced by the Iraqi state television. Sadrists who were identified wearing "blue hats," stormed an anti-regime rally which led to the demise of a protester who was stabbed to death, leaving three others injured, security and medical sources stated.

4 February: A day after a demonstrator was killed, tensions between Sadr supporters and protesters against Allawi's nomination increased, as the rift erupted into a fistfight between the two opposing groups in the southern city of Diwaniyah. According to Arab News, despite the interference of security forces, the young anti-regime protesters chanted against Sadr, Iraqi authorities, including Iran, which they blamed for supporting the government's harsh actions towards protesters. Furthermore, in order to ensure schools were fully reopened in Diwaniyah after sit-ins had forced them to shut down, security forces were sighted outside the schools, as well as government offices.

5 February: Violence erupted in the holy city of Najaf, as al-Sadr's followers tried to forcibly remove demonstrators from their protest camps. Medical sources stated that at least 8 people were killed during the clash, leaving at least 20 more injured, according to Reuters News Agency. Out of the 8 protesters who were killed, 7 of them were believed to have died as a result of bullets to either the chest or head, France 24 added. The number of injured people had reached 52, according to The New York Times.

Mohammed Allawi, Iraq's PM-designate, held a meeting with several representatives of the protest movement from the various provinces across the country. Similar clashes involving al-Sadr's followers attempting to suppress the protests were reported to have taken place across other parts of the country as well, including Karbala, Diwaniyah, Dhi Qar, Baghdad, among others, according to the Kurdistan 24.

6 February: Following the violence that erupted the day before between anti-government protesters and followers of Moqtada al-Sadr, hundreds of anti-government protesters returned to the site of the violence, as they rallied through the streets of the holy city of Najaf, in an attempt to rebuild their protest camp that was destroyed. In the evening, U.S. Secretary of State Mike Pompeo, issued a statement condemning the killing of anti-government protesters in the city of Najaf and called on the Iraqi government to see to the need of protesters, as well as punish those responsible for the killings.

7 February: With Ayatollah Ali al-Sistani being one of the most powerful and influential figures in Iraq, several protesters and Iraqi activists were clinging on to him as their last beacon of hope, as they urged him to call for a million-strong march against the Iraqi government ahead of Friday's sermon. During the Friday sermon, in remarks presented by al-Sistani's representative in the holy city of Karbala, he denounced the clash with Sadrists in Najaf two days before and held security forces responsible for failing to prevent the death of 8 protesters. It was projected by the Iraqi Human Rights Commission on Friday that almost 550 people lost their lives since the beginning of the anti-government protests in Iraq, which started in October last year. Grand Ayatollah Ali Sistani, further called on Allawi to create a government that will be trusted by the people, and represent them as well.

Following the Friday sermon of influential Shia cleric Ali al-Sistani', a lot of anti-government protesters and activists are feeling hopeful and convinced that the protest movement which started in early October, will now regain its momentum, Al Jazeera reported. The president of the Kurdistan Regional Government Nechirvan Barzani, has issued a statement condemning the unlawful use of force against peaceful protesters on Wednesday, even though the Kurdish authorities have adopted similar approaches.

9 February: Moqtada Al-Sadr suggested in a tweet, 18 points which the Iraqi protesters should stick to during protests, including the avoidance of free mixing between men and women in protest sites.

10 February: A protester was shot dead near a protest site at the al-Ain University in the city of Nasiriyah, as Iraqi security forces fired live ammunition to break up a gathering of protesters, according to The New York Times. The security forces were believed to have started shooting at the protesters when they attempted creating a blockage at the entrance of the university. American citizens living in Iraq have been advised by the U.S. embassy in Iraq, to remain vigilant ahead of huge protests that are expected to hold for the next three days in Baghdad, as well as Najaf.

However, the Iranian consulate in Iraq that was set ablaze last year by protesters is now functional, as Visa operations continue, while regular consular services are expected to commence from next week, according to Bloomberg. The Najaf police have been charged with the responsibility of providing security and protection for the consulate after its reopening, Lieutenant Najm Al-Saadi added.

11 February: Influential Shia cleric Moqtada Al-Sadr, has dissolved the Blue caps unit which has been accused of violence that led to the death of anti-government protesters last week in Najaf, and also publicly rejected what is known as the Sadrist movement on Twitter. Member of the Iraqi Council of Representatives, Sarkawt Shamsulddin speaking at the Atlantic Council on 11 February, maintained that the huge protests that have been going on since October last year which ended the previous government, presents Mohammed Allawi with the golden chance of bringing about tangible transformation in Iraq.

12 February: Protest sites in Baghdad have been reopened by Iraqi security forces, allowing anti-government protests continue in al-Tahir square only on the condition that protection will be provided by the Iraqi security forces. Protesters were seen collaborating with security forces in order to ensure free movement across the Sinak bridge that has been closed down for months.

13 February: Iraqi women have come out in hundreds to criticize the use of force against protesters in Baghdad and the city of Nasiriyah, in order to challenge the call made by Moqtada al-Sadr against the mixing of men and women in protest sites. Male anti-government protesters also joined the rally, with some of the women seen wearing veils, while others had their faces wrapped in black and white scarves. A usual incident happened on the protest site, which involved both men and women setting their camps side by side one another. According to the Daily Sabah, several protesters carried Iraqi flags and roses, marching for over an hour, with the men linking their arms around the women to form a circle. Later in the evening, al-Sadr condemned the rally on his Twitter account, which he described as a sin and an attempt at compromising the righteousness of Iraq.

40 days after Iranian general Qasem Soleimani and Iraq's paramilitary leader were killed by US drones, hundreds of Iraqis in Baghdad came out to the site to mark 40 days remembrance of their death.

14 February: Haaretz disclosed that Iraqi security forces were preparing in anticipation of a violent clash between the protest movement and followers of al-Sadr the next day, as two large-scale protests were expected to take place

15 February: A 50-year-old Iraqi with German residence tried to set himself ablaze during the Munich Security Conference near Karlsplatz, Germany. The German police were able to prevent him as the man immersed himself in Petrol and attempted rushing into a gathering with a lighter in his hand, The Baghdad Post added.

16 February: Alaa al-Rikaby, the prominent activist in Nasiriyah was backed to replace the premier-designate Mohammed Allawi by Hundreds of protesters who demonstrated on the streets carrying al-Rikaby's photo. Meanwhile, shopkeepers in Al Rasheed Street, one of the oldest streets in Baghdad, have decried the lack of improvement in trade, regardless of the reopening of roads and bridges nearby.

17 February: Based on plausible accusations received by the United Nations envoy to Iraq, of peaceful protesters being fired at with hunting rifles, firebombs and stones last weekend, the Iraqi government has been urged to look into the matter to ensure the protection of peaceful protesters. In a statement issued by UNAMI, because of similar use of force, at least 150 people were wounded in the holy city of Karbala last month. Following a meeting between the speaker of the Iraqi parliament Mohammed al-Halbusi and a 13-year-old protester popularly known as Hamid Daghethoum, the speaker pledged his full backing for the demands made by protesters.

20 February: Protesters in the city of Nasiriyah, which has been a focal point of the anti-government protests in the south, were still demanding for one of their own to become the prime minister, regardless of the increasing force applied by security forces. According to Kurdistan24, a delegation of the Kurdistan Region has accused Allawi of not recognizing the political and legal position of the Kurdistan region, after its visit to the capital to hold talks with the Iraqi PM, which was abruptly shortened.

22 February: Iraqi protesters decided to move the center of their protests from Baghdad to Nasiriyah in Dhi Qar province, with hundreds of protesters arriving from Najaf and more expected from other cities as well.

23 February: New clashes erupted between anti-government protesters and security forces at Khilani Square in Baghdad central, where one person was killed and at least 6 others injured. Live ammunition was fired by Iraqi security forces to break up the crowd that was gathered close to Sinak bridge which was opened again recently by security forces after being closed down by protesters for several months. A commendable 24 -year-old Iraqi Nurse Hannah Jassem, was reported to have assisted in stitching up injuries in an open-fronted shack at the protest site in Tahrir Square over the weekend. Also, more than 1,000 students marched through Tahrir Square, holding up pictures of victims who they believed were martyred in the demonstrations.

On the same day, US Secretary of State Mike Pompeo called Mohammed Allawi to congratulate him on his appointment as the Prime Minister-designate, according to The Sun Herald. During the call, both parties assented to the significance of improving the conditions, well-being and security for the people of Iraq by the government.

25 February: Despite reports that five people tested positive for coronavirus, as well as heavy rainfall, thousands of anti-government protesters came out to protest in Baghdad, wearing face masks. According to the Middle East Monitor, the confidence vote for the newly formed cabinet of Prime Minister-designate Mohammed Allawi, which was planned for the day by the Iraqi parliament, was delayed by two days.

26 February: Prime Minister-designate Mohammed Allawi, disclosed that the Iraqi parliament tomorrow will hold a vote to confirm his new cabinet, which he maintained will consist of autonomous ministers.

27 February: Several lawmakers who were not satisfied with Allawi's ministerial list abstained from attending the session, which led to the postponement of the session by the Iraqi parliament. Prior to the vote, Mohammed Allawi reportedly sent a letter to the British embassy requesting the annulment of his British citizenship, the National added. There was anticipation that Iraq's speaker of parliament Mohammed Al-Halbousi, would bring up the issue of Mohammed Allawi's dual citizenship during the session, according to The New Arab. An official complaint has been filed with Iraq's attorney by the Iraqi parliament, following the accusation made by Muhammed Allawi, that lawmakers are collecting bribes in order to thwart his regime.

=== March ===
1 March: The Iraqi parliament for the second time this week, failed to endorse Mohammed Allawi's new cabinet. That left him with no choice but to step down as the Prime Minister-designate. According to The Jakarta Post, Allawi in a letter he sent to President Saleh stating the reason for his resignation, he accused some political factions of not having the will of the people at heart and neglecting the importance of the reform. He also urged the President to accept his apology for being unable to establish a new cabinet, while admitting that he is unfit for the role he has been tasked with. Following Allawi's proclamation, protesters in Tahrir Square showed excitement and joy, as they had already disapproved of his nomination and his entire cabinet, the BBC added. However, in accordance with the Iraqi constitution, President Barham Salih is expected to propose a new prime minister within the next 15 days. The governor of Basra province Asaad al-Eidani, is said to be one of the many names speculated to replace Mohammed Allawi, despite his objection by demonstrators prior to the appointment of Allawi, according to The New York Times.

2 March: Early in the morning, just hours after Prime Minister Candidate Mohammad Tawfiq Allawi withdrew his nomination for the position, two Katyusha rockets reportedly struck the heavily fortified Green Zone in central Baghdad, leaving zero casualties, according to DW. One of the rockets was believed to have landed close to the US embassy, Reuters added.

3 March: The United Nations envoy for Iraq criticized the Iraqi parliament for failing to reach a quorum, which hampers the ability of the government to make decisions, hence, leading the Iraqi people into an unpredictable future.

5 March: Protesters took to the streets again early in the morning in Basra province, blocking vital roads, burning tires, as well as urging the immediate appointment of an independent to create a new government.

8 March: A clash erupted between Iraqi security forces and protesters, which left 16 protesters injured, when the security forces fired tear gas at the protesters in Baghdad's Al-Khilani Square, according to the MEM.

10 March: In Maysan province of Southern Iraq, unknown gunmen killed two anti-government activists, Abdel-Aaddous Qasim and Karrar Adil, according to a security source in Iraq. Shia armed groups linked with Iran have been blamed by some activists of being responsible for the attack, but the groups have falsified these claims.

17 March: Former governor of the holy city of Najaf Adnan al-Zurfi, was appointed by President Barham Salih, to succeed Mohammed Allawi as the new prime minister-designate of Iraq. Al-Zurfi, who was the parliamentary head of the Nasr coalition that was created by former PM Haider al-Abadi, also has 30 days to form a new cabinet that is subject to approval by the parliament. According to the BBC, larger groups were unable to concur on choosing Abdel Mahdi's successor, which subsequently led to the appointment of Zurif by President Saleh. However, Protesters in Tahrir Square turned down al-Zurfi's nomination, regarding him as part and parcel of the corrupt regime they've been trying to sweep away. The U.N. special envoy to Iraq Jeanine Hennis-Plasschaert, applauded Zurif's nomination, adding that the country requires a powerful and efficient PM.

New evidence has come to light, as a result of an investigation conducted by Amnesty International and SITU Research which showed that Iraqi security forces have been intentionally using smoke grenades and heavy tear gas to kill protesters, instead of breaking up crowds since October last year when the protests commenced. The research encompassed thorough video analysis and a 3D reconstruction of incidents near Baghdad's Tahrir Square and Jimhouriya Bridge, according to Urdu Point News. Based on their findings, the grenades which were produced by Serbians and Iranians, saw to the fatal destruction of at least two dozen demonstrators in the place of the incident since October last year.

21 March: Protesters in Tahrir Square and other parts of Iraq disclosed that their anti-government protests had officially come to an end, as they have decided to go back to their homes until the coronavirus has been defeated.

29 March: Regardless of the COVID-19 pandemic and curfew in Iraq, few protesters in Baghdad have decided to adopt a systematic way of maintaining the protest camps while engaging the security forces, as well as the deadly virus. Prime Minister-designate Adnan al-Zurfi pledged to use all resources at his disposal within both the public and private sector, as he announces the initiation of a government program to effectively tackle the coronavirus outbreak.

=== April ===
4 April: Prime Minister-designate Adnan Zurfi handed over his plans to the Iraqi parliament as demonstrators refused to obey curfew imposed by the government, leading to the eruption of violence with security forces. Several Iraqi security forces were reported to have sustained injuries in the process of firing tear gas at protesters in Nasiriya, who responded by throwing gasoline bombs at them, according to The Baghdad Post. Despite anti-government protests having been officially put on hold earlier last week in order to deal with the COVID-19 pandemic, protesters continue to remain in major protest sites, as they claim that the killings of activists are yet to stop.

6 April: The American oil company located in the oil-rich Basra province of southern Iraq, came under attack as five rockets were reportedly fired close to the site, Iraqi military confirmed. The Security forces added that at least three Katyusha missiles were fired, leaving zero casualties, according to the MEM. Following the attack, a rocket launcher with 11 unused missiles was also discovered by the Iraqi security forces along the Zubair-Shuaiba road, but they were able to defuse them. However, no group has been linked to the attack yet.

7 April: A strategic dialogue between Washington and the Iraqi government is scheduled to take place in June, the US Secretary of State Mike Pompeo disclosed. He added that several issues are expected to be ironed out, including the position of US military forces currently staying in Iraq. Considering the growing tensions in the region, Prime Minister Adel Abdul-Mahdi has also expressed his support for the initiation of a dialogue between the two countries, according to The Jerusalem Post.

9 April: Prime minister-designate Adnan al-Zurfi tendered his resignation, which a few hours later led to the nomination of Intelligence chief Mustafa Al-Kadhimi as his successor, by President Barham Saleh. According to Zurfi's statement, his country's best interests are what prompted his decision to resign, including internal and external reasons. Zurfi further extended his sincere apologies to all Iraqis that invested their trust in him. After al-Kadhimi's nomination, he assured Iraqis that he would primarily ensure that he meets their demands and also establish a well functioning government. Considering that Kadhimi has the support of several political parties in Iraq, he is predicted to not suffer the same fate as his former predecessors, according to VOA News.

10 April: Prime Minister-designate Mustafa al-Kadhimi was officially congratulated on his new appointment, when he received a phone call from top Kurdish officials, according to the Middle East Monitor. Although Kadhimi is the third candidate within the last 10 weeks, he is most likely to flourish in establishing a new government seeing that he was presented by President Salih at a formal ceremony in the midst of many high profile and famous politicians. According to Aljazeera, al-Khadhimi has maintained that he will be able to form a new government by 25 April, which is two weeks earlier before the 30 days given to him to form a new cabinet as stipulated in the constitution.

11 April: In an effort to begin the formation of a new cabinet, Iraqi Prime Minister-designate Mustafa al-Kadhimi held a meeting with the Minister of Finance Fuad Hussein. Kadhimi emphasized during the meeting that his new government would be that which caters for the needs of the general public, by providing essential services. According to Kurdistan 24, the finance minister revealed that his meeting with al-Kadhimi was a friendly one, as they talked about the specific steps to be taken regarding the formation of his new government and the problems Iraq is facing.

15 April: Turkey reportedly violated Iraq's airspace when Turkish drones and airplanes carried out an airstrike near the Makhmour Refugee Camp, according to The Jerusalem Post. Two women in the refugee camp were said to have lost their lives during the incident, according to the air defense command in Iraq.

16 April: The Iraqi foreign ministry reacted to the attack carried out near a refugee camp in Iraq by Turkish drones on Wednesday evening, as the foreign minister Muhammad Al-Hakim summoned the Turkish ambassador to Iraq. Furthermore, the foreign ministry called on Turkey to recognize Iraq's sovereignty, collaboration in enforcing border security and putting a stop to the attacks on Iraqi regions.

21 April: A few hours after the restrictions regarding coronavirus were slightly relaxed, at least one protester was reportedly killed during violence with protesters who took to the streets near Tahrir Square in Baghdad by unidentified gunmen, leaving many others injured. The restrictions were relaxed due to the Muslim holy month of Ramadan, which is expected to last until 22 May at the end of the holy month, The Jerusalem Post added. In Baghdad, movements will only be permitted from 6 am to 7 am from Sundays to Thursdays and all day long on Friday-Saturday. However, schools and universities are not expected to reopen and all flights will stay shut down, according to Reuters. Government buildings will only keep up the capacity of their staff to a maximum of 25%.

=== May ===
7 May: The newly formed cabinet of Prime Minister Mustafa al-Kadhimi was confirmed by the Iraqi parliament. 266 members of parliament out of a total of 329 members were present for the session, seeing to the approval of the majority of ministers submitted by al-Kadhimi. According to Kurdistan 24, only 5 out of 22 ministerial nominees were rejected by the parliament. The ministers rejected included those for agriculture, trade, culture, migration and justice. Since the resignation of the previous PM amidst large anti-government protests in November 2019, al-Kadhimi is regarded as the first real prime minister in Iraq. The new PM affirmed that his primary focus as prime minister would be to fight the COVID-19 outbreak, as well as bringing those responsible for the unlawful killing of protesters in anti-government protests to justice. The U.S. Secretary of State Mike Pompeo expressed his support for the new cabinet during a call with al-Kadhimi, according to Reuters.

9 May: After the assumption of office on Thursday, the new Iraqi prime minister Mustafa al-Kadhimi presided over his first cabinet meeting. During the meeting, al-Kadhimi emphasized that his top priority as PM is to hold early parliamentary elections, by backing the Independent High Electoral Commission of Iraq (IHEC). Other vital issues such as health, security and economic situation were also addressed in the meeting. Kadhimi also reportedly held meetings with the ambassadors of both US and Iran, Matthew H. Tueller and Iraj Masjedi, VOA News added. Furthermore, with the exception of those accused of killings during the anti-government protests that lasted for several months, al-Kadhimi has promised that his cabinet will see to the release of innocent protesters that have been in detention.

10 May: Following the promise made by the new Iraqi prime minister Mustafa al-Kadhimi to free protesters that have been detained during the anti-government protests which began in October 2019, protesters gathered in hundreds in Baghdad's Tahrir Square. Despite the firm security put in place, several protesters also gathered in the streets of cities such as Diwaniyah, Muthanna, Wasit, Dhi Qar, according to the MEM. During the demonstration, the protesters called for immediate reforms by the government, prosecution of those accused of being responsible for the unlawful killings of hundreds of protesters. Meanwhile, protesters in the southern province of Basra called for governor Asaad al-Eidani's dismissal from office, alongside his two deputies, according to Kurdistan 24. The calls for the removal of the Basra governor were made after armed men opened fire at the building of Iranian-backed militia Thaa'r Allah, leaving one protester dead and four others wounded.

Amidst the renewal of fresh anti-government protests in Iraq, the Supreme Judiciary Council on Sunday, issued a statement ordering courts to see to the release of protesters that were arrested since protests began last year. The release of the protesters by the Iraqi judiciary was ordered based on demands made by the new prime minister al-Kadhimi, the Washington Post added. Also, Mustafa al-Kadhimi promoted the Iraqi general Lt. Gen. Abdul Wahab al-Saadi who played a vital role in the war against Islamic State and was subsequently demoted last year by Abdul-Mahdi.

11 May: Following the killing of one protester outside the building of a local party's headquarters in Basra on Sunday, Iraqi security forces raided the building, detaining at least five men accused of carrying out the shootings. Prime minister Al-Kadhimi confirmed that the raid by the security forces was carried out based on his orders in accordance with judicial warrants, Al-Monitor added. A statement from the White House revealed that President Trump spoke with the new Iraqi prime minister over the phone, in order to congratulate him on the endorsement of his new cabinet by the Iraqi parliament, according to Reuters. During the call, Trump pledged the support of the U.S. in assisting Iraq in their fight against the COVID-19 pandemic, as well as combating ISIS. However, according to Kurdistan 24, a strategic dialogue between the US and Iraq is scheduled to hold in June, in order to strengthen their relationship.

18 May: The building of the Saudi-owned MBC channel in Baghdad was swamped by disgruntled protesters in response to the documentary broadcast by the channel, regarding the bombing of French and U.S. embassies in 1983. The angry protesters portrayed the documentary as an insult to the late Shia leader Abu Mahdi al Muhandis, which depicted him as a terrorist. Photos of al-Muhandis and Iraqi flags were waved by the protesters, demanding for the closure of the channel, as well as chanting slogans against Saudi Arabia during the protest. The MBC channel disclosed that no injuries were recorded during the demonstration, according to the Daily Star. According to Anadolu Agency, In an attempt to control the protest, security forces were dispatched to the site even though the demonstrators had already made their way into the building, severely damaging all equipment inside.

However, there are no certainties as to whether the protesters who stormed the building are associated with any Iranian-backed organisation in Iraq.

23 May: A report from the Human Rights office of the UN Assistance Mission in Iraq, revealed the disappearance of over 100 people, with several others tortured by armed groups since protests began in October last year. All of the tortured or abducted victims were either involved in the anti-government protests or had provided a form of assistance to protesters, the UNAMI added. According to Kurdistan 24, the report showed that 123 people went missing between 1 October 2019, and 21 March 2020, while 98 of them have been found, 25 others are yet to be found. The male victims confirmed that they were tortured, beaten and electrocuted, whereas the female victims also confirmed being tortured and even molested or compelled with rape.

26 May: After revising the report provided by the United Nations Human Rights Office in Iraq on Saturday, the new government of Mustafa al-Kadhimi has promised to launch an investigation into the incidents covered in the report thoroughly. The office of the new PM added that the investigations will be absolutely independent, without any bias. The UN Security Council has urged the Iraqi government to ensure that the investigations are as accurate as possible.

=== June ===
15 June: Human Rights Watch (HRW), a US-based rights group, released a 42-page document which suggested that the previous Iraqi government had denied activists and journalists their right to critics, as well as free speech. The group has called on both the Iraqi and Kurdistan Region to enforce reforms of its penal code including other laws, such that they will be in accordance with international law.

=== July ===
6 July: The renowned Iraqi expert on armed groups Hisham al-Hashimi was reportedly shot dead in the capital Baghdad. The incident took place near Hashimi's residence in the district of Zayouna, when two armed men riding a motorbike shot him, after which he sustained grave injuries and was taken to the Ibn Al-Nafees Hospital in Baghdad where he died. The CCTV footage of the incident suggested that Hashimi's killers were highly trained professionals, as they shot him several times at a point-blank distance, Arab news added. Iraqi security officials stated that prior to al-Hashimi's assassination, he was believed to have received threats from Iran-backed militias, according to the guardian. Also, a source told TRT World that a month ago, Hashimi revealed the amount of Iraq's revenue that was absconded by Iran-backed militias.

7 July: Following the assassination of al-Hashimi, Iraqi protesters on Tuesday, criticized Iran's supreme leader al-Khamenei, describing him as a killer and blaming Iran-backed groups for the death of al-Hashimi.

12 July: A protest spokesman disclosed that Iraqi security forces killed two people and injured several others when they opened fire on a gathering of protesters in southern Baghdad, Rudaw reported. Thousands of protesters gathered in Baghdad from different provinces of southern Iraq, in order to reject the termination of a government-allocated compensation which was declared by the Iraqi PM Mustafa al-Kadhimi, as part of an economic reform package. However, the Iraqi army has denied using live ammunition on protesters, claiming that no one was killed, and that they only turned the protesters away when they attempted to attack security forces, according to army spokesman Yehya Rasoul.

21 July: German art curator and activist Hella Mewis was reportedly abducted in Baghdad, according to the Euro News. She was said to have been kidnapped outside her office in central Baghdad by unknown militants. However, it is not yet clear as to who is responsible for her abduction, The Times reported.

24 July: Iraqi forces reportedly rescued the kidnapped German art curator Hella Mewis, spokesman of Iraq's military Yahya Rasool, confirmed in a statement. No further comments were given, as no group has claimed responsibility for the abduction. The overnight operation was said to have been supported by an investigative court in Baghdad, while investigations are still ongoing, according to Abdelsattar Bayraqdar, the spokesman for Iraq's Supreme Judicial Council. According to Iraq's interior ministry, the operation in east Baghdad was conducted by a joint task force composed of anti-crime units, federal police, as well as the elite Falcons intelligence forces. Subsequently, in the afternoon, Mewis was handed over to the German embassy in Baghdad and the German foreign minister Heiko Maas, hailed the efforts made by both the Iraqi government and security forces.

In the first rallies since Prime Minister Mustafa al-Kadhimi was elected, at least two protesters were killed in Baghdad during overnight demonstrations on 26 July. In addition, dozens of people were wounded after officials fired live rounds at the demonstrators who were assembled in Tahrir Square. Several members of the security forces were also said to have sustained minor injuries, according to the police. Al-Kadhimi said his administration would investigate Sunday's events and prosecute the guilty party. A medical source disclosed on Monday that out of the two protesters who died, one was killed after being shot with a tear gas canister in the head, while the other was shot in the neck, according to Arab News. Yehia Rasool, spokesman of the Iraqi military revealed in a statement that precise instructions had been issued regarding the unlawful use of force by security forces against demonstrators, except when absolutely necessary.

30 July: The Iraqi government announced its decision to treat those killed during protests as martyrs and compensate each family with 10 million dinars ($8,380). Also, the committee that was tasked with looking into the death of two protesters on Sunday, disclosed that three policemen had been suspended for the use of hunting rifles against demonstrators and are currently awaiting trial. The Interior Minister Othman Al Ghanimi who made the announcement, also added that the issue had been handed over to the Judiciary, with arrest warrants sent out to the three perpetrators. During the press conference, the minister stated that the suspects included two majors and a lieutenant and also revealed the arms and ammunition used by them. Meanwhile, protesters have declared that they would not stop the demonstrations, maintaining that the investigation into the violence does not offer a solution to the country's numerous grievances, according to The Independent.

31 July: Prime Minister Mustafa al-Kadhimi announced that legislative elections would be held early, and scheduled them for 6 June 2021. There has not been any confirmation though, on whether al-Kadhimi would seek for a second term despite holding early elections.

=== August ===
11 August: A drone attack was reportedly launched in the Kurdish region in northern Iraq which claimed the lives of two top officers of the Iraqi military forces. Following the attack, the 13 August scheduled visit by the Turkish Defense Minister Hulusi Akar to Baghdad was said to have been called off by Iraq. Also, the Turkish ambassador was summoned for the third time over Turkey's military actions in the country, Arab News added. Despite the drone attack, Turkey has maintained that it would not stop its cross-border operations against the PKK fighters in the region and has further called on the Iraqi authorities to extend their cooperation.

19 August: Unknown gunmen reportedly shot and killed a female anti-government political activist in Iraq's southern city Basra. Three others were said to have been injured when the gunmen on a motorcycle opened fire on their vehicle, with the victim Reham Yacoub inside. According to Al Jazeera, the three others injured were all women, although one of them died.

21 August: In Basra protesters set fire to a local parliament office after gathering to demand the resignation of governor Asaad Al Eidani for the killing of two activists the previous week. The protesters were able to set the outer gate of the parliament building ablaze, as they clashed with security forces. At least 8 security personnel were believed to have been wounded during the violence, according to Al Jazeera. Following the clashes, Iraqi PM Mustafa al-Kadhimi reportedly visited Basra late on Saturday, 22 August and assured that the perpetrators will face punishment over the killings. He also sacked Basra's police chief in response to the continued unrest, the National added.

Separately, protesters in the southern city of Nasiriyah were said to have destroyed the offices of Shiite parties, in response to an explosion that left 11 protesters injured in Nasiriyah's Haboubi Square. Eyewitnesses on the scene confirmed that the protesters used bulldozers to demolish the offices of the Dawa Party and Badr Organization, although they had already set the buildings on fire.

=== September ===
20 September: Several Iraqi protesters reportedly gathered overnight in the city of Nasiriyah, Dhi Qar province to criticize the abduction of a renowned activist, including the injury of another activist. Three main bridges, alongside roads were said to have been shut down by the protesters as they burnt down tires. Two pick up vehicles were used by unidentified persons to abduct the young activist Sajjad al-Iraqi, while leaving the other activist Basim Falaih wounded, after shooting him, according to eyewitnesses. Members of the tribe of deputy leader of the Popular Mobilization Forces, Abu Mahdi al-Muhandis who was killed by an American drone attack in January, are being held responsible by some activists in Nasiriyah for Sajjad's abduction. However, security forces have managed to ID the location of the abducted anti-government activist by tracking phone calls, the state media disclosed.

21 September: Following the kidnapping of prominent Iraqi activist Sajjad al-Iraqi, Prime Minister Mustafa Al-Kadhimi on Monday directed a joint operation consisting of a special anti-terror force and the army's air force to search for the activist who was taken by unknown gunmen in the southern city of Nasiriyah on Saturday. Apart from rescuing the pro-demonstration activist, the units of the Counter-Terrorism Service have also being instructed by the PM to ensure that the kidnappers are captured and brought to face punishment.

Subsequently, two people from Sayed Dakhil district in Dhi Qar province were charged with the abduction of Sajjad al-Iraqi, as their arrest warrants were issued by the Iraqi authorities. In spite of issuing arrest warrants for the two suspects, the Iraqi counter-terrorism service (ICTS) is yet to make any success in finding Sajjad al-Iraqi even though they have continued their search.

28 September: Iraq's Defense Ministry disclosed that a rocket attack close to Baghdad's airport, claimed the lives of five civilians. Two Katyusha rockets were said to have been fired by armed groups which killed three children and two women, leaving two other children injured. The rockets which landed at a house in Baghdad were initially targeted for the Baghdad airport, according to Police sources . Reports suggested that the rockets were fired from the Al-Jihad neighborhood of Baghdad, Arab News added.

Following the unfortunate incident, Iraqi PM Mustapha al-Kadhimi gave a directive suspending security forces from duty at the airport, according to BBC. The US State Department criticized the attack which was launched just after giving out a warning regarding shutting down its embassy in Baghdad, if the Iraqi government is unable to curb attacks against US and other Coalition members. The department has also called on the Iraqi authorities to take prompt response and ensure that the perpetrators are brought to face justice.

=== October ===
1 October: Iraq's protest reached its one-year mark, as thousands of protesters took to the streets in Baghdad, including the southern part of the country to honor the anniversary of protests which began in October 2019. Several protesters waved the Iraqi flag, chanted and sang songs of patriotism by clapping and pledged to follow the path of revolutionaries. Protesters who gathered in Tahrir Square were sighted raising pictures of more than 600 people who died since the beginning of the protests last year in Baghdad and across southern Iraq. According to the Middle East Eye, protesters have issued a deadline to the Iraqi government to meet their demands by 25 October, or they embark on a nationwide strike.

11 October: A faction of Iraqi militia groups which are backed by Iran, have presented the Iraqi government with the option of a ceasefire agreement against assault on US forces. The ceasefire option provided by the groups was based on the stipulation of a timeframe for the retreat of US troops being provided by the government. No specific deadline has been issued by the groups, but they have threatened to continue carrying out attacks if the US forces refuse to withdraw, according to a spokesman of one of the strongest Iran-backed militia groups in Iraq, Kataib Hezbollah. The spokesman Mohammed Mohi, also added that the ceasefire would consist of the entire factions of the (anti-U.S.) resistance, as well as other groups that have been attacking US troops.

A few hours prior to the announcement of the temporary ceasefire deal by the groups, a convoy that was carrying equipment for the U.S.-led coalition, was reportedly targeted with a roadside bomb, according to the Associated Press. During the attack which occurred in southern Iraq, one vehicle in the convoy was damaged, Iraq's military disclosed. However, no casualties were reported, or those responsible for the attack.

17 October: Several supporters of the Popular Mobilization Forces reportedly set the Kurdish party's headquarters in Baghdad ablaze following criticisms from a Kurdish former minister. The protesters of the Iran-backed Shia militia group were frustrated with the remarks made by the former minister Hoshyar Zebari that the Iraqi government should steer clear Baghdad's Green Zone of PMF militias. They also burned down Kurdish flags, with others holding pictures of the slain Iranian general Qasem Soleimani, including that of Iraqi lieutenant Abu Mahdi al-Muhandis.

Iraqi high-ranking officials have criticized the attack by the Hashd al-Shaabi protesters and called for an investigation into the attack. Also, President Barzani has criticized the attack on the KDP offices and urged the Iraqi government to carry out a comprehensive probe into the incident.

25 October: Thousands of Iraqi protesters took back to the streets of Baghdad, as the anti-government protests reached its one-year mark. At least 42 security personnel, including about a dozen protesters were said to have been wounded after the peaceful protests turned violent when protesters attempted to break through a barricade set up by the security forces, according to The Washington Post. Security forces responded with tear gas after the anti-government protesters threw Molotov cocktails and rocks at them. Demonstrations also reportedly took place in several other cities such as Nasiriyah, Basra and Najaf, with protesters decrying the level of corruption in the country.

26 October: The protests which started on Sunday, entered its second day with several protesters clashing with Iraqi security forces again. Demonstrators shifted to the highly fortified Green Zone in Baghdad, where government offices, parliament building and US embassy are located. Also, security forces under the Baghdad Operations Command, stopped several protesters coming from Babylon and Diwanieh provinces from making their way into Baghdad, by mounting checkpoints on the roads, AP News added.

=== November ===
6 November: In the city of Basra, student anti-government protests kicked off. According to Al Jazeera, one anti-government demonstrator was killed by a bullet during rubber bullet firing many police in demonstrators.

17 November: Following the announcement made by the US to decrease the number of its troops from 3,000 to 2,500, four rockets were believed to have been fired on Iraq's heavily fortified Green Zone in Baghdad. During the attack which was launched just an hour after the announcement made by the US, at least one child was killed, leaving five other civilians wounded, the Iraqi military disclosed. The rockets were reportedly fired from the al-Amin al-Thaniyah neighborhood of Baghdad, the VOA News added. Although, the C-RAM air defense system which was set up by the US earlier in 2020, managed to intercept the rockets. Despite the US accusing Iran-backed militia for attacks in the past, no Iran-backed militia has taken responsibility for the attack yet.

27 November: Protests in the city of Nasiriyah began in support of Shia popular leader Muqtada al Sadr and demanded that the government should resign. Anti-government demonstrations spread nationwide, according to Al Jazeera. Police has been accused of using live ammunition and shooting as a tactic against the demonstrators. Mass protesters rallied in their thousands and then, chaos and clashes between security forces and protesters left four protesters dead and several demonstrators injured. According to a hospital source, there was indication of protesters dying as a result of bullet wounds. However, with early elections being one of the biggest demands of the anti-government protesters, the Iraqi Prime Minister Mustafa al-Kadhimi planned to hold elections in June 2021, which is a year earlier than the initial date.

28 November: Following the overnight killing of protesters, several people reportedly returned to the sites of the anti-government sit-ins, in order to show their support for those killed. As other cities across Iraq take security measures in the deadly clash between anti-government protesters and Sadr supporters, the death toll in the city of Nasiriyah reached six, according to Al Jazeera.

=== December ===
2 December: Several Iraqi civil servants reportedly took to the streets of the Kurdistan Region of northern Iraq, to protest over the delay in payment of salaries. The protesters were said to have gathered at the epicenter of Sulaimani's anti-government protests of 2011, the Saraa square. Water cannons, tear gas, rubber bullets, including live rounds was believed to have been used by security forces to break up the gathering of protesters, according to the Middle East Eye.

7 December: Following days of protests in the northern Kurdish region of Iraq, a protester was said to have been killed by armed men who were protecting the headquarters of the Kurdistan Democratic Party (KDP). Two other protesters were also wounded during the unrest. According to a statement by the spokesman of the Chamchamal Health Directorate in Sulaymaniyah district, Sherif Rahim, the protester who was killed was a 16-year-old teenager.

8 December: As of Wednesday, the death toll was reported to have reached eight people, since the beginning of the protests against delayed payment of salaries in Kurdish Iraq. In an effort by the Iraqi Kurdish authorities to prevent the violence from extending, a 24-hour ban on movement was imposed in Sulaymaniyah and other nearby towns, which was expected to last until Wednesday midnight. The demonstrations had already extended across six towns surrounding Sulaymaniyah on Tuesday, with disgruntled protesters setting government offices and political parties' headquarters on fire.

Iraq's president, Barham Salih has urged security forces to adhere to the law and avoid applying unlawful use of force against peaceful protesters. The Iraqi president further called on the demonstrators, including the security forces to conduct themselves peacefully and not resort to violence. Also, the United Nations Assistance Mission for Iraq (UNAMI criticized the unlawful use of force that was applied against the demonstrators in Sulaymaniyah district, as the citizens' right to peaceful protest must be ensured.

9 December: According to the Oil Ministry, two explosions hit an oil field in northern Kirkuk province on Wednesday, which they described as a terrorist attack. Despite two small oil wells being set on fire, there was no impact on the entire production from the oil field, VOA News added. However, no casualties have been reported during the blast so far.

Meanwhile, the Kurdish Prime Minister Masrour Barzani, has blamed Baghdad for the ongoing violence which erupted due to the delay in payment of salaries in Iraq's northern Kurdish region. Barzani added that the Iraqi government failed to carry out the budget transfers which were required to make the payments of salary possible.

15 December: Salah al-Iraqi, a notable Iraqi activist was reportedly killed by unknown gunmen in Baghdad, according to Al Jazeera. Local media reports suggested that Salah was shot five times by the unknown assailants who were in masks, in the suburb of Baghdad al-Jadeed. Salah al-Iraqi was said to have played a vital role in anti-government protests that began last year against deteriorating economic conditions, corruption and massive unemployment rate. According to the Iraqi Network for Social Media (INSM), prior to al-Iraqi's killing on Tuesday, he had already been targeted twice.

20 December: Just two weeks to the one-year anniversary of the killing of Iranian general Qasem Soleimani, reports have shown that the US Embassy in Baghdad's heavily fortified Green Zone has been under a rocket attack. At least eight Katyusha rockets were said to have been fired at the Green Zone on Sunday, which led to a few damages on the compound, the US embassy and Iraqi military disclosed. According to CNN, at least one Iraqi soldier was wounded when one of the rockets landed close to a security checkpoint. Although, the U.S. Embassy's C-RAM defense system was said to have been activated during the attack in order to intercept the rockets, the ABC News added.

However, in a statement made by the U.S. Secretary of State Mike Pompeo, revealed that there had been at least one Iraqi civilian that was injured. Meanwhile, the US embassy has urged all Iraqi leaders to ensure that the perpetrators face justice and also take preventive measures from these kinds of attacks.

== Timeline 2021 ==
=== January ===
Thousands of Iraqis demanded United States armed forces pull out of the country in protests in Liberation Square, Baghdad, one year after the American drone strike which killed Qasem Soleimani and Iraq's militia commander, Abu Mahdi al-Muhandis. The anniversary of their deaths in Baghdad was also marked in Iran and by supporters in Syria, Lebanon, Yemen and elsewhere in the Middle East. The place where both Soleimani and al-Muhandis were killed became a shrine-like area which was sealed off by red ropes, including their pictures in the center by the protesters.

8 January: Just a day after a massive crackdown against activists in Nasiriyah's Habboubi Square, Iraqi security forces clashed with protesters, as they fired tear gas and bullets to disperse the crowd. A day prior to the clashes, Ali al-Hamami, a lawyer and local activist was said to have been killed in his home by unidentified assailants, according to Kurdistan 24.

10 January: As the protest in the southern city of Nasiriyah entered its third day, a policeman was reportedly killed by gunshot to the head, with 33 other policemen wounded, according to the Iraqi army. Additionally, medical sources confirmed that 7 protesters were also injured during the clashes with security forces. It was not immediately clear who was behind the killing of the policeman, as the army did not provide further details on the incident. Despite the ongoing violence between the protesters and security forces, protesters who are currently occupying Haboubi Square have maintained not leaving the site until one of their major demands, which is releasing all those who have been detained is met. However, reports have shown that all the detainees have now been released, the Iraqi High Commission for Human Rights (IHCHR) confirmed.

19 January: Following the request made by Iraq's Independent High Electoral Commission for additional to prepare for the polls which are supposed to hold on 6 June, the Iraqi cabinet voted unanimously to move the general elections to 10 October 2021. Prime Minister Mustafa al-Kadhimi explained in a statement that the postponement was to allow the IHEC adequate time to ensure the conduct of a free and fair election. Nevertheless, there are growing concerns among activists and protesters who see the postponement of the elections as a move to overlook their major demands.

21 January: A twin explosion reportedly hit a commercial street close to Tayaran Square in Baghdad. At least 28 people were killed during the attack, with 73 other people wounded, according to the Deutsche Welle. The first suicide bomber was said to have detonated his explosives after convincing people to gather around him as he rushed into the market claiming to be sick. Subsequently, the second bomber set off his explosives, as people gathered around the victims of the first attack, the interior ministry disclosed.

There haven't been any immediate claims of responsibility by any group yet, for the deadly attack. Medics have expressed their concerns over the possibility of a drastic increase in the death toll from the initial figures, as security forces continue to guard the site of the blast.

=== February ===
14 February: Four suspects were detained in southern Iraq's Basra by security forces, on the allegation of killing protesters and activists. According to Al-Monitor, the four suspects have already confessed to the killing of two journalists, Jinan Madhi Al-Shahmani and Ahmad Abdessamad. They are also said to be members of a 16-person network, as the Iraqi intelligence is still trying to identify the rest of the members of the network. However, it was not made clear as to whether the four suspects who have been apprehended are linked with any paramilitary force or political party.

15 February: An airport in the city of Erbil, in northern Iraq was hit by a rocket which claimed the life of a civilian contractor with the American-led military coalition forces. At least nine people were wounded during the attack, according to the Guardian. A US service member was also reported to have been among the wounded victims. Subsequently, after the rocket attack, the airport was reportedly closed.

16 February: The US alongside its various European counterparts, criticized the attack on the US airbase and assured to assist Iraq with the investigation, US Secretary of State Antony Blinken revealed in a statement.

18 February: Protests reportedly erupted near the Turkish embassy in Baghdad, to condemn the Turkish military intervention in the northern region of Iraq. Roads leading to the Turkish embassy had to be shut down by the Iraqi security forces, according to Arab News.

=== April ===
1 April: Three oil facilities in southern Iraq's Dhi Qar Governorate were reportedly shut down by protesters, due to the federal budget that was approved by the Iraqi parliament on Wednesday. The protesters believed that the new budget did not address the protesters' urgent need for employment opportunities.

4 April: Just a few days ahead of strategic Iraq-U.S. talks, two rockets landed close to the Balad airbase in northern Baghdad. There were no immediate reports of casualties, damage of properties, or claims of responsibility for the attack.

7 April: Five policemen were reportedly charged by an Iraqi investigative committee, in connection to the unlawful discharge of firearms on protesters in the last week of February in Nasiriyah.

12 April: Iraqi President Barham Salih revealed the signing of a decree which is supposed to ensure that early elections are conducted on 10 October. According to Iraq's Independent High Electoral Commission, more than 25 million Iraqis are qualified to vote in the upcoming October elections, with the exception of those staying overseas.

18 April: An Iraqi air base north of Baghdad was targeted by several rockets, according to an Iraqi military commander. According to the Times of Israel, five rockets were fired at the Balad air base housing US troops, with two of them hitting a dormitory and canteen inside the airbase. At least five people were injured during the attack, three of which were Iraqi soldiers and two other foreign contractors.

There was no immediate claim of responsibility for the attack by any group, although Iranian-backed armed groups have claimed responsibility for similar attacks in the past. Also, no casualties were recorded during the incident, Al Jazeera added.

22 April: Another rocket attack was launched close to the Baghdad International Airport, the Iraqi military revealed. At least three rockets were said to have landed near the perimeter of the airport. Also, Iraqi security forces were able to defuse pre-launched rockets which were kept on the rooftop of an unoccupied building that was used for the rocket launch. There were no immediate reports of casualties or property damages, according to Reuters.

=== May ===
9 May: An Iraqi activist Ihab Al-Wazni who had survived an assassination attempt which killed Fahim al-Ta'i in December 2019, was shot dead outside his home by armed men on motorbikes in Karbala. Following his death, protests erupted in Iraq's Karbala, as protesters went on to burn tires and shut down roads in the city. Trailers of the Iranian consulate in the city were also set ablaze by the protesters, VOA News added. Protests were also held in the capital Baghdad, including other cities in southern Iraq, with protesters setting the headquarters of Iran-backed militias and government offices ablaze. The Iraqi police have assured that they will leave no stone unturned, as they are determined to bring the perpetrators behind the killing of Ihab al-Wazni to justice.

10 May: An Iraqi journalist, Ahmed Hassan, was entered into intensive care receiving two bullets in the head and one in the shoulder, as he got out of his car in Al Diwaniyah. According to BBC News, brain surgery was performed on Hassan after being admitted into the intensive care at a hospital in Baghdad. Both Hassan and Wazni were said to have played a vital role during the protest against the Iraqi government in October 2019, France 24 added.

15 May: Several Iraqi demonstrators gathered in Baghdad, to show support for Palestinians, over the Israeli airstrikes on Gaza. The rallies were said to have been in response to calls made by influential cleric Muqtada al-Sadr, including other parliamentary leaders. Sadr was also said to have pledged his support to Palestinian armed groups in Gaza, the Euronews added. Palestinian flags were waved by the protesters, as they were shouting anti-Israel slogans and condemning Israel and America.

25 May: One protester was killed and dozens were injured when police attacked protesters gathered at Baghdad's Tahrir Square in the evening, where hundreds marched to demand the end of targeted killings of prominent journalists and activists. Five policemen were also reported to have been among those who were injured when protesters hurled stones at the security forces. Among the protesters who gathered at the Tahrir's Square, several of them came from across southern Iraqi cities where several deaths had been recorded. Tear gas and live ammunition were said to have been used by the Iraqi security forces, in an attempt to disperse the gathering of protesters.

26 May: Iraqi security forces arrested the head of the Al-Anbar faction of the Popular Mobilization Forces, Qasim Muslih, for his role in the killing of two civil activists, including Al-Wazni's. Musleh has also been linked with attacks on bases hosting coalition forces, Al-Monitor added. However, a government source revealed that a military and security committee has been established to carry out the investigation into the case. The Iraqi PM Al-Kadhimi was also reported to have held a meeting with top Shiite political leaders, prior to ordering the formation of an investigative committee. A report by Human Rights Watch has suggested that there's a possibility of Iraqis being unable to vote in the upcoming 2021 elections, due to the ongoing impunity.

Meanwhile, as a show of force, unknown gunmen were said to have driven vehicles around Baghdad's fortified Green Zone, following the arrest of Qasim Muslih. As a security measure to protect the government and diplomatic missions, the elite Counter-Terrorism Service, including Iraqi security forces were deployed to the Green Zone.

27 May: The US has expressed its anger over the use of force that was applied against peaceful protesters who were demanding reforms. They also encouraged the Iraqi government to bring the perpetrators behind the attacks against peaceful demonstrators to justice, the US State Department spokesman stated.

30 May: The United Nations Assistance Mission for Iraq (UNAMI) disclosed that over 1,000 cases concerning the use of force against protesters in Iraq were closed, mostly as a result of threats issued to the families of the victims.

=== June ===
2 June: The threats by the Iran-aligned armed militias against the fortified Green Zone were condemned by the UK, the foreign minister of UK Dominic Raab revealed in a tweet.

6 June: Iraq's air defenses managed to intercept and shot down two drones at the Ain al-Asad air base housing US troops, the Iraqi military disclosed. In order to bring down the drones, the US military's C-RAM defense system which is situated in western Iraq had to be launched, Al-Jazeera added. There wasn't any immediate claim of responsibility by armed groups regarding the attack, despite that Iran-backed groups have claimed responsibility in the past for similar attacks.

Separately, hours prior to the shooting down of the two drones that targeted Ain al-Assad base, a rocket that was fired over Baghdad's airport was also said to have been shot down. There were no casualties or damages recorded, the U.S.-led military coalition's spokesperson in Iraq revealed.

9 June: Two Iraqi military bases housing US-led coalition troops, including foreign contractors, came under multiple rocket attacks. The Balad airbase was said to have been targeted by three rockets, although there were no damages or casualties recorded.

Just a few hours following the attack on the Balad airbase, at least one missile also hit near a military base that is next to the Baghdad International Airport. An anonymous security source claimed that five rockets were launched from the nearby Khalis District along the banks of the Tigris River, according to Kurdistan 24. However, no immediate claim of responsibility for both attacks was made.

Separately, Iran-backed militia commander Qassem Musleh was released after being arrested for two weeks on terrorism allegations and violations against protesters. Musleh was released by the judiciary, as there wasn't enough evidence to implicate him on the terrorism charges. His release was also said to have followed the arrival of Iranian Gen. Esmail Ghaani, head of the expeditionary Quds Force in Baghdad. Musleh received a warm welcome from his supporters at Baghdad's Jadriya Bridge upon his release, as they snapped pictures and rejoiced together.

=== July ===
2 July: With the temperature reaching more than 50 degrees across some parts of Iraq amid deteriorating power and water cuts, several Iraqi protesters reportedly took to the streets of Baghdad. Particularly the southern provinces of Iraq and most of Baghdad were said to have faced more of the effects of the power cuts. Local media reports blamed Friday's power cut on the failure of a major power line, BBC added. In the city of Kut, the protesters gathered outside the closed gates of an electricity substation, to condemn the power cuts that have left them with only several hours of electricity in a day.

Also on Friday, a statement from the office of the Iraqi PM Mustafa al-Kadhimi revealed that the director of Iraq's national electricity company had been fired and that the PM has reassured the restoration of electricity.

8 July: Widespread protests over power cuts have continued across Iraq, including Basra whose temperature has exceeded 50 degrees. The protesters maintained that the power outages were a result of rampant corruption, as well as the inadequacy of infrastructure.

Meanwhile, three rockets targeted the US embassy in Baghdad's heavily fortified Green Zone, despite earlier attacks on bases housing US troops. According to the Iraqi military, the US embassy was not hit during the attack, but three places close to the Green Zone were hit. The embassy's defense system, managed to divert one of the rockets that were fired, according to Reuters. One of the rockets landed on the outskirts of a residential area, one was close to the headquarters of the National Security Agency, and the other was at a public square.

16 July: The Iraqi Prime Minister Mustafa al-Kadhimi, revealed that arrests have been made, regarding the killing of renowned analyst Hisham al-Hashimi in early July 2020. One of the suspects who were arrested, Ahmed al-Kenani, was said to have been connected with Kata'ib Hezbollah, which Hashimi criticized in the past, according to a security source.

18 July: Several Iraqi protesters took to the streets of Baghdad, calling for justice, over the killings of activists, since the beginning of the anti-government protest movement in 2019. Protests were also said to have been held in southern Iraq's Nasiriyah.

24 July: Just a day after the son of a renowned Iraqi activist went missing, he was reportedly found shot dead in the southern Iraqi city of Basra. 26-year-old Ali Karim, son of Basra activist Fatima al-Bahadly was said to have been abducted on 23 July, by unknown assailants. According to a medical source, Karim was shot twice, once in the head and the other in his chest. Haider al-Abadi, former Iraqi PM criticized the incessant killing of activists, as he mourned the death of Fatima al-Bahadly's son.

=== November ===
Hundreds were injured and two people were killed in violent clashes in Baghdad after the parliamentary elections. These protests had demanded the election results be recounted after alleging election fraud.

== See also ==
- Irreligion in Iraq
- 2020s in political history
- 2018–2022 Arab protests
- 2015–2018 Iraqi protests
- Politics of Iraq
- Safaa Al Sarai
- 2021 Baghdad clashes
- Attack on the Al-Habboubi Square (2020)
- 2020 Kurdish protests in Sulaymaniyah Governorate
- 2022 Iraqi political crisis
- October Protest Movement
