= Tishreen Movement =

Social movement in Iraq

Tishreen Movement حراك تشرين
- Founded: 19 October 2019; 7 years ago
- Headquarters: Baghdad
- Ideology: Iraqi nationalism Secularism; Anti-clericalism; Liberalism; Reformism; Progressivism; Anti-Iranian sentiment
- Political position: Big tent

The October Protest Movement, known in Iraq as the Tishreen Movement, is a social movement in Iraq. The movement came into being during the 2019–2021 Iraqi protests in tandem with similar protests in Lebanon and Sudan. The main center of protests organized by the movement was Baghdad's Tahrir Square, with other protests taking place in Basra and Najaf. Following months of protest, the movement succeeded in forcing the resignation of the government of former Prime Minister Adil Abdul-Mahdi.

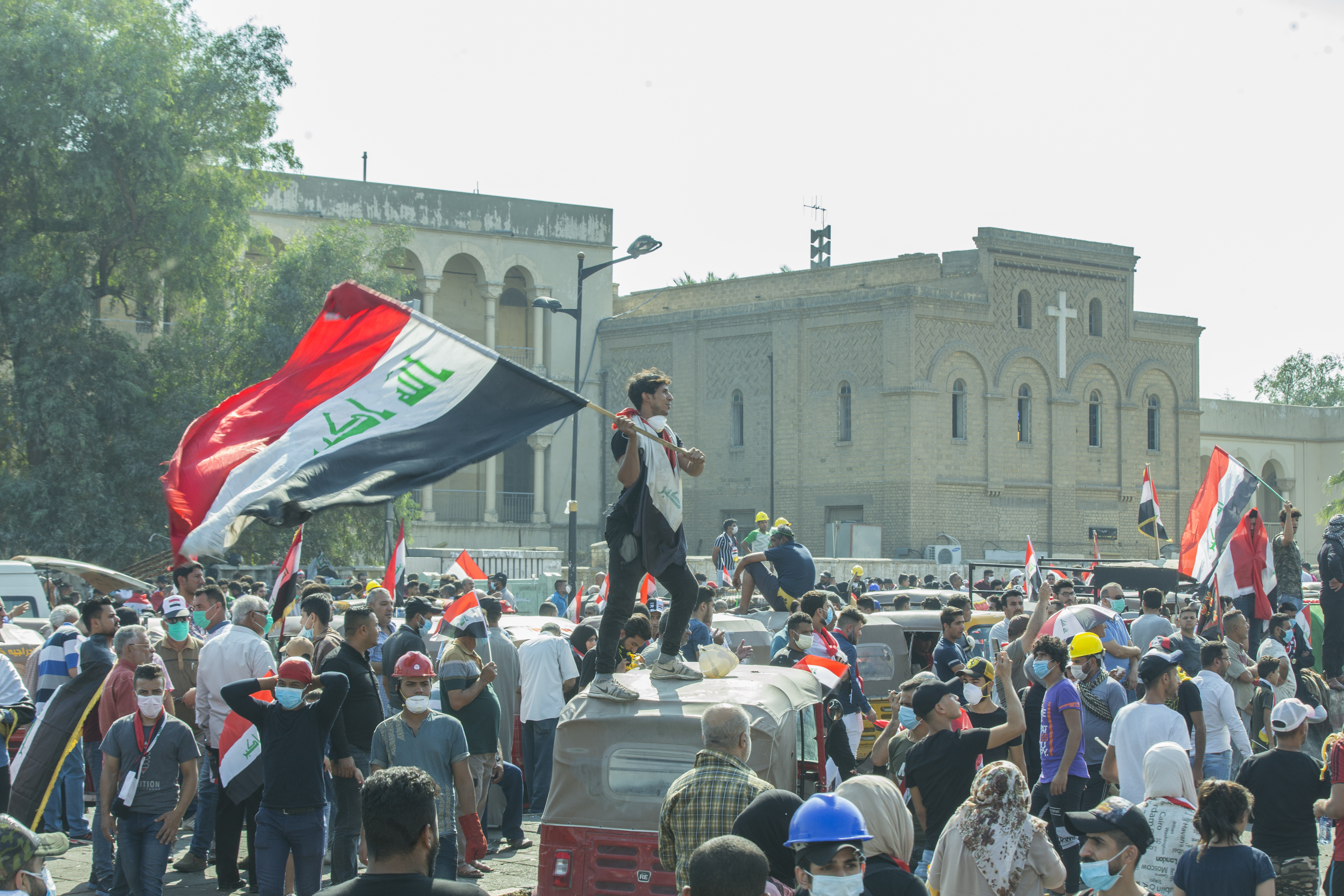
An Iraqi protester waving the flag of Iraq during a demonstration.

== Demands ==
Demands presented during the protests started with a call for increased job opportunities and better services, as well as to bring an end to the corruption sanctioned under the muhasasa system—the ethno-sectarian power-sharing arrangement which has shaped Iraqi politics since 2003. Later, protesters came together to call for political reform through early elections. A survey conducted by the Enabling Peace in Iraq Center found that 82% of Iraqis agreed that fighting corruption was a top priority.

== Repression ==
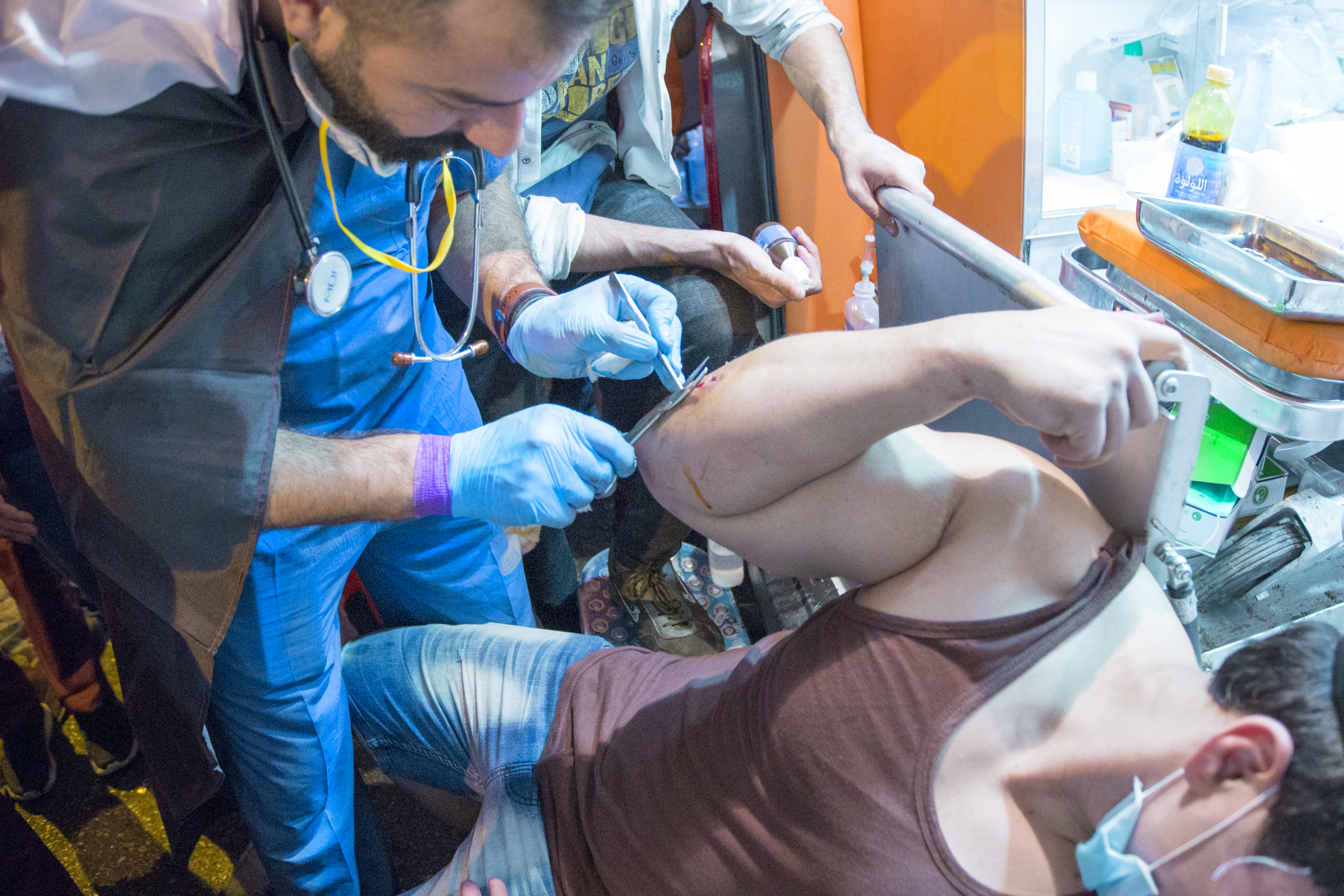
A demonstrator suffers from the effects of live ammunition.

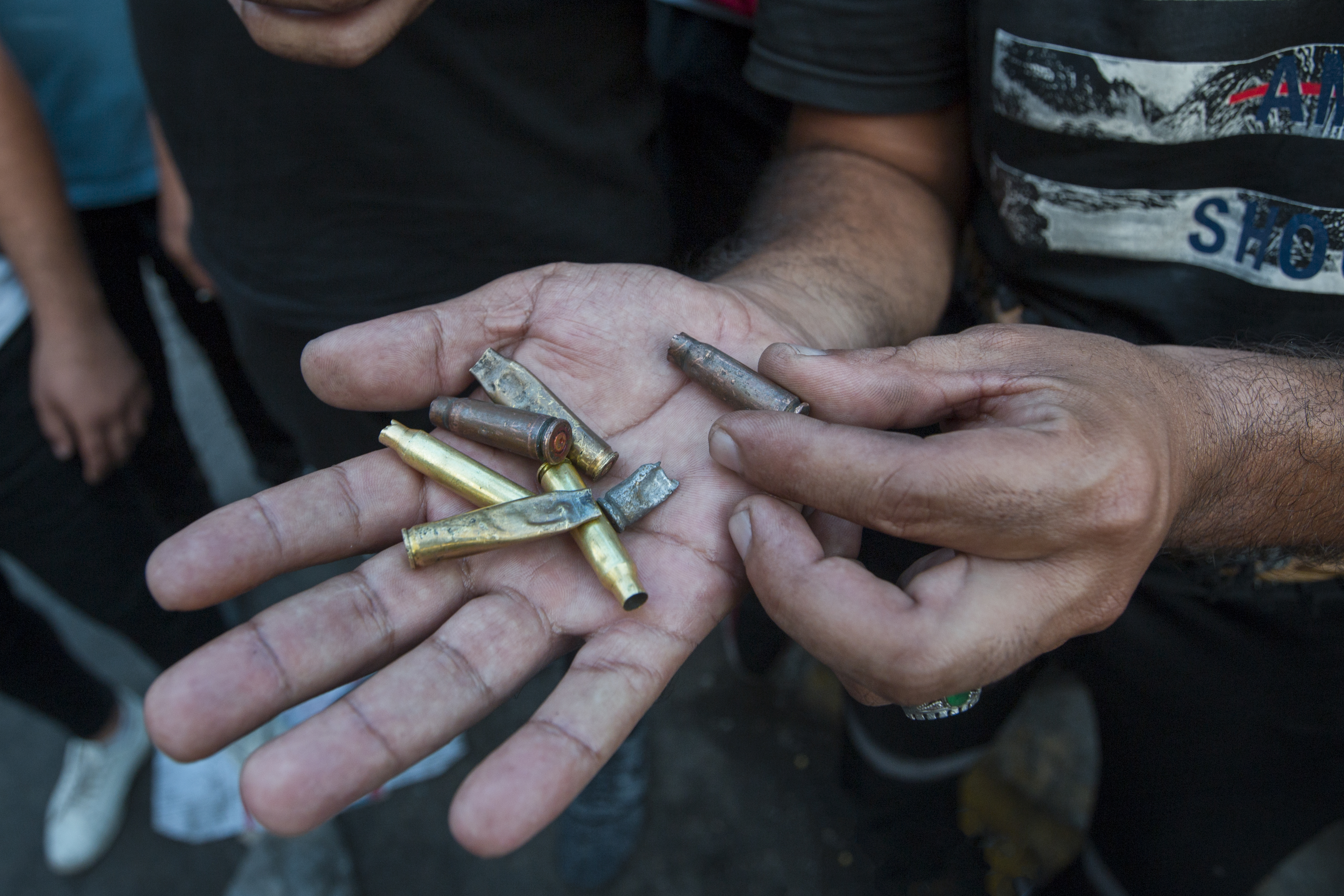
Bullet casings of ammunition used by government security forces.

The Tishreen Movement faced severe repression from the Government of Iraq under Adil Abdul-Mahdi. State security forces responded with violence against peaceful protesters on several occasions both in Baghdad and Iraq's southern provinces. Security forces responded with violence from the first day of protests, using tear gas and live ammunition to disperse anti-government protesters. The government asserted that the violence had been provoked by rioters.

It is estimated that the violent repression during the first six months resulted in 600 dead and 20,000 injured among protesters. Militias part of the Popular Mobilization Forces also participated in repression of the October Protest Movement.

The confrontation between protesters and the security forces was amplified through the involvement of outside actors. Iran sided with the government of Abdul-Mahdi and Iraqi paramilitary groups in opposing the protest movement, having invested heavily in both. The United States rhetorically backed the movement's demands, decrying violence faced by the protesters. Many protesters expressed their dissatisfaction with Iranian influence over Iraq's security forces, fueling the belief among paramilitary groups that the US was responsible for the protests.

The unrelenting protests calling for accountability and a change to the electoral law made Abdul-Mahdi's position as Prime Minister untenable, eventually forcing him and his government to step down. Abdul-Mahdi, however, remained as caretaker until the nomination of Mustafa al-Kadhimi as his replacement. Kadhimi came to power on a promise to hold security forces accountable and schedule early elections. Elections were announced for June 2021, a year earlier than scheduled.

== Political participation ==
Supporters of the Tishreen Movement have been divided on the issue of political participation. A significant number of activists argued for a boycott of the Federal Elections for Iraq's Council of Representatives held in October 2021 expressing a lack of confidence in the possibility of democratic change. The use of political violence by militias has been a common tactic against activists associated with the October Protest Movement. Ehab al-Wazni, an activist organizing protests against the government in Karbala was assassinated on May 9, 2020. Qasem Musleh, the militia leader widely believed to be responsible for ordering the assassination, was briefly arrested but released soon afterwards when the government came under pressure from the Popular Mobilization Forces.

Several new political parties were founded in anticipation of the October elections claiming to represent the October Protest Movement. The Emtidad Movement was founded in January 2021 to protest unemployment and the corruption of Iraq's political elite. Imtidad is led by Alaa al-Rikabi, an activist from the city of Nasriyah who rose to prominence during the October Protests.

The Democratic ''Nazil Akith Haqi'' Movement, the Fao-Zakho organization, and the Tishreen National Organization also registered for the elections. Parties associated with the protest movement participated mostly in the southern provinces of Iraq. The 25 October Movement, the Iraqi House, the Organization of Opposition Forces and the National House did not register to run as a result of threats against activists.

Other activists have advocated to boycott the early elections demanded during the protests. Fearing that participating in them would lend legitimacy to a process they believe to be inherently flawed and fraudulent these activists encouraged Iraqis to stay home.

=== October elections ===
The October 2021 Iraqi parliamentary election witnessed record-low levels of political participation among Iraq's voting public. Participation stood at 43.54% for the whole of the country according to the Independent High Electoral Commission, with voter turnout as low as 34% in Baghdad. The elections were the first since the introduction of the single non-transferable vote requiring parties to strategically field candidates across 83 districts.

Parties associated with the Tishreen Movement performed surprisingly well in the southern provinces of Iraq. Imtidad managed to win a total of nine seats in Nasriyah, south-central Babel and Najaf. Ishraqat Kanoon, an Islamist party associated with the Abbas Shrine in Karbala managed to win 6 seats in Babel, Karbala, Baghdad and Qadisiyah. Although not based in the protest movement, the previously unknown party does claim to support the same values of citizenry and responsible government.

=== Tishreen in Parliament ===
Although several candidates were elected based on their association with the October Protest Movement, cooperation among independent members of parliament has been difficult. Several meetings were held early in 2022 which were meant to lead to the formation of a political bloc in parliament representing the Tishreen protesters. The newly elected MPs have, however, been divided on the issue of participation in the formation of the next government. Members of parliament have come under criticism for not ruling out participation with political parties that do not have the support of the protest movement. As a result, independent candidates have so far failed in forming a cohesive parliamentary bloc representing their interests.

Iraqi political analyst, Mohanad Faris, has noted how Independent MP's have effectively become kingmakers. As neither the Sadrist Movement nor the Shiite Coordination Framework backed by Iran has enough seats to form a governing coalition, independent lawmakers have begun to take sides in order to tilt the balance of power.

The Kurdish New Generation Movement and Imtidad together with a group of independent announced the formation of the ''For the People Alliance'' on December 16, 2021. The alliance consists of 18 MP's. Another five MPs who ran as independents together constitute the ''Independent Popular Bloc.'' A bloc of ten MPs was formed by Ishraqat Kanoon together with some other independent candidates. Not all independents elected during the October elections have joined a political bloc in parliament.

Imtidad has been internally divided over the issue of political participation with established political parties. After Imtidad Secretary-General Alaa al-Rikabi stated Imtidad would support the re-election of Muhammad al-Halbousi as speaker of parliament, Nour Ali Nafeh al-Jalihawi resigned her membership in the party in protest. At the point of the election she was the youngest person ever to hold a parliamentary seat.

Five members left the Imtidad Movement on May 19, 2022, to become independent members of parliament. The MP's left in protest over Alaa al-Rikabi's leadership of the party. A day later, the Imtidad Movement's General Secretariat relieved Rikabi from his position as Secretary-General.

== See also ==
- Irreligion in Iraq
- Safaa Al Sarai
- Turkish Restaurant
