= Safaa Al Sarai =

Iraqi activist (1993–2019)

- صفاء السراي
- Born: 28 June 1993; Sha'ab, Baghdad, Iraq
- Died: 28 October 2019 (aged 26); Baghdad, Iraq
- Cause of death: Injuries from a gas bomb during protests
- Education: Computer Science
- Alma mater: University of Technology, Iraq
- Occupations: Activist, poet, painter
- Known for: Activism in the 2019–2021 Iraqi protests
- Notable work: Poetry, paintings of Iraqi national symbols
- Movement: Tishreen Movement

Safaa Al Sarai (Arabic: صفاء السراي; 28 June 1993 – 28 October 2019) was an Iraqi activist who has been called the icon of the Iraqi tishreen protests.

== Background ==
He was born into a family from Baghdad that lived in the Sha'ab neighborhood. He graduated from high school to enroll in the University of Technology, and during his school years he worked as a porter in a market in the Jamila commercial district. His father died early in his life, then his mother died from cancer in 2017. He later graduated as a programmer from the department of computer science at the University of Technology. After graduating, he worked in writing petitions in front of one of the buildings of the Traffic Directorates. And a week before his death, he got a new job in his specialty, when he was employed at a private university. Safaa Al Sarai wrote popular and eloquent poetry on a small scale. He was also a skilled painter, and in poetry, he showed unrivalled admiration for the Iraqi poet Muzaffar al-Nawab. He participated in the "I am Iraqi, I Read 2018" festival, and painted paintings of Iraqi national symbols such as Zaha Hadid, Muzaffar al- Nawab, Muhammad Mahdi al-Jawahiri, Badr Shaker al-Sayyab and many others.

== Activism ==
He participated in the 2011 demonstrations in Tahrir Square, and in 2015, during the era of Prime Minister Haider al-Abadi, he participated in the 31 July demonstrations in Baghdad. He was arrested in 2018 for his participation in the demonstrations in poorer areas in eastern Baghdad and was released afterwards. Safaa started receiving threats to discourage him from participating in demonstrations and civil protests.

== Letter to the PMF ==
Before his death, he wrote a letter titled to the Popular Mobilization Forces, praising their sacrifices, and warning them of a scheme in which they were intended to participate in suppressing the demonstrations, hours after the statement of the Deputy Chairman of the Popular Mobilization Authority, Abu Mahdi al-Muhandis, in which he said that his forces would intervene at the appropriate time, the last of what he wrote: "Shame on you."

== Death ==
He was injured on Monday evening (28 October 2019) in the center of Liberation Square, while security forces fired gas bombs on the square. He was transferred to the Al-Jumla Al-Asabia Hospital, and doctors performed an operation for him in which they removed the gas bomb fragment from his head and stopped the bleeding. However, his condition remained critical, and he died of his wounds. His body was taken to Liberation Square after the athan for the fajr prayer despite the curfew, and his friends carried him under the Freedom Monument in the middle of the square during the early dawn hours, and the mourners chanted "Thanwah," with the words "Raise his head, O Thanwah Abinj."

== International reactions ==
The BBC counted him among the five most important faces of protest around the world.

Walid Jumblatt, leader of the Progressive Socialist Party in Lebanon, condemned his death, saying: "The martyrs do not go to heaven. They roam the heavenly books, each in his own way, like a bird, a star or a cloud. They appear to us every day and cry for us, we who are still in the hell that they tried to extinguish with their blood."
