= Turkish Restaurant (Baghdad) =

Abandoned building in Baghdad, Iraq

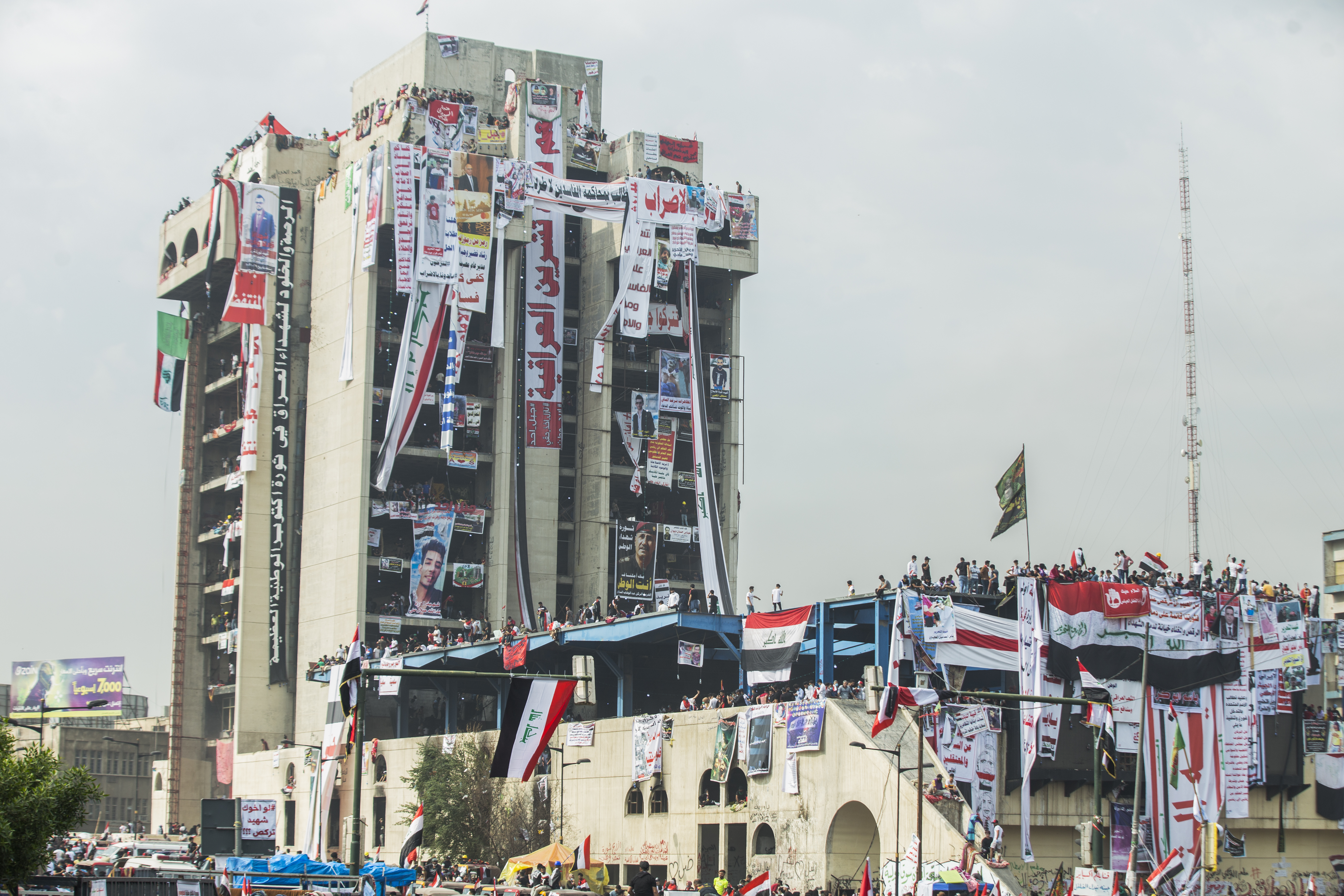
- The Turkish Restaurant in November 2019
- Alternative names: Tahrir Tower

General information
- Location: Liberation Square, Baghdad
- Completed: 1983

Technical details
- Floor count: 14

The Turkish Restaurant, also known as Tahrir Tower and nicknamed Jabal Uhud by protesters, is an abandoned 14-story building in Liberation Square, Baghdad. It became famous as an unofficial headquarters of the 2019 Tishreen Movement protests.

== History ==
The building was built in 1983 as a commercial center and featured a Turkish restaurant on its top floor with panoramic views. U.S. forces bombed the building during the 2003 invasion of Iraq, resulting in its abandonment. In November 2009, Iraq's Ministry of Environment reported light radiation contamination on three floors of the building, which it attributed to the 2003 bombing; the Baghdad Municipality nonetheless leased the building to an investor for 30 years. A 2020 study by researchers from the University of Baghdad found levels of the radioisotopes lead-214, lead-212 and actinium-228 above international limits in soil samples taken at the site.

=== Protests ===
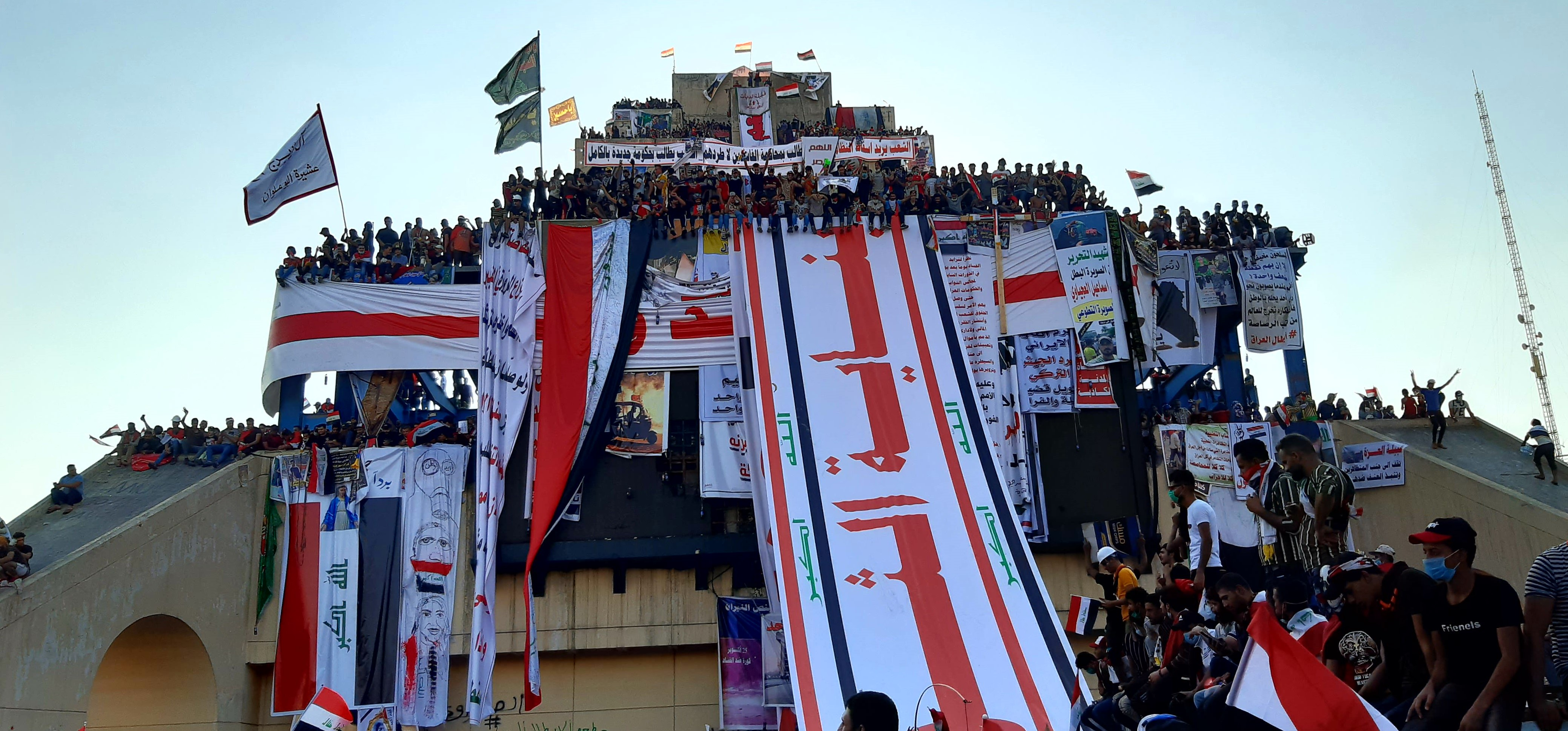
The Turkish Restaurant in 2019, clad in Tishreeni protest banners

Security forces used the building as a command center to monitor and suppress the 2011 Iraqi protests. At the start of the 2019 Tishreen Movement protests in early October, snipers used the building's elevation to fire down into protest crowds in nearby Liberation Square. When protests resumed in late October, a group of protesters took over the building to deny security forces access and monitor their movements. The building then became a center and symbol of the Tishreen Movement and displayed large protest banners. Protesters set up a library and hoisted food and supplies into the building's upper floors using ropes. Electricity was supplied by generators and by power donated from a nearby building.

After the Tishreen Movement gradually lost strength in 2020, other actors took over the building in recognition of its power as a protest symbol. In November 2020, the Sadrist Movement took over the building and draped Sadrist banners. In January 2021, the Popular Mobilization Forces used it to commemorate the one-year anniversary of the deaths of Qasem Soleimani and Abu Mahdi al-Muhandis.

Prime Minister Mustafa al-Kadhimi, who presented himself as sympathetic to the Tishreen Movement, announced that the Turkish Restaurant would be turned into a museum honoring the movement, and in mid-2021 a billboard announcing the "Tishreen Museum" was placed on the building. The project stalled – officially due to legal disputes over the ownership of the building – and, as of 2023, the museum had not been created and the billboard had been removed.

In May 2024, the Sadrist militia Saraya al-Salam reportedly handed control of the building to Iraqi security forces.
