= Al Rasheed TV =

Al Rasheed Satellite Channel
- Type: Satellite
- Country: Iraq
- Availability: Middle East
- Owner: Saad Asem Al-Janabi / Asem Saad Al-Janabi
- Official website: alrasheedmedia.com

Al Rasheed Satellite Channel (Arabic: قناة الرشيد الفضائية) is an Iraq-based satellite television channel broadcasting from Baghdad where its headquarters is located. Al Rasheed programming includes: news programs, drama and comedy shows. The channel is Owned by Saad Asem Al Janabi and his son Asem Saad Al Janabi.

== Availability ==
The channel is available for its Arab audience throughout the world via satellite. Online streaming is available through its website.
