= Dijlah TV =

Dijlah TV قناة دجلة الفضائية
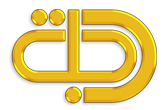
- Country: Iraq
- Broadcast area: Worldwide, via Satellite and Internet

Programming
- Language: Arabic

Ownership
- Owner: Ali al-Zaidi

History
- Launched: 2010
- Founder: Mohammed al-Karbouli

Links
- Website: dijlah.tv

Availability

Streaming media
- Live stream: dijlah.tv/live

Dijlah TV (Arabic: قناة دجلة الفضائية) is an Iraqi satellite television channel based in Amman, Jordan. It is one of the most watched news channels in Iraq.

It was founded by the Iraqi politician and former trade minister, Mohamed al-Karbouli. Its current CEO and owner is Ali al-Zaidi who acquired it from al-Karbouli.

== Controversies ==
In 2017, the channel was reportedly banned in Erbil due its "negative portrayal of the 2017 Kurdistan Region independence referendum". The board of Dijlah TV subsequently accused the Kurdish authorities of violating the constitution by preventing them from exercising their right to journalistic freedom.
