= Liberation Square, Baghdad =

Square located in Baghdad, Iraq

Coordinates: 33.3293°N 44.4101°E

Liberation Square
- City Square
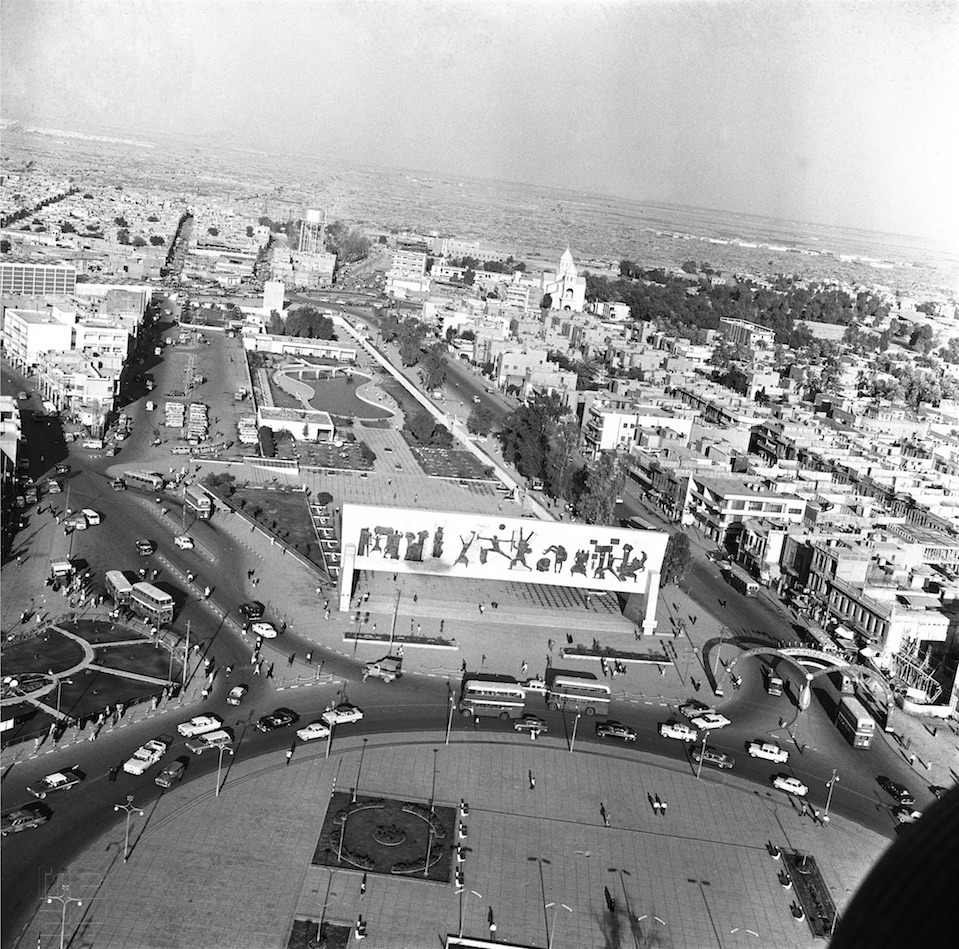
- The square in 1961
- Opened: 1937
- Location: Al-Sa'doun Street and al-Jumhuriya Bridge; Baghdad, Iraq
- Interactive map of Liberation Square

Liberation Square or al-Tahrir Square (Arabic: ساحة التحرير), originally known as Queen Alia Square (Arabic: ساحة الملكة عالية) is a square located in central Baghdad at the intersection of al-Sa'doun Street and al-Jumhuriya Bridge road. Al-Tahrir Square is Baghdad's biggest and most central square located in the al-Rusafa part of the city on the eastern banks of the Tigris river.

In recent years, al-Tahrir Square became the center of various protests and demonstrations in Baghdad and in Iraq. Most notably of these was the unrest of the October 2019 Iraqi protests that saw hundreds of thousands gathering to protest against the Iraqi government and its failures with many volunteered to help the protestors.

== Description ==
Known as al-Tahrir Square locally, the square consists of open public spaces with al-Umma Garden, situated behind the square. It is home to a major bronze monument which commemorates the 1958 establishment of the Republic of Iraq. Being the biggest square in the city, it the center of Baghdad that is also the intersection of al-Sa'doun Street and connects the traffic road to al-Jumhuriya Bridge. The square is also located in front of the building nicknamed the "Turkish Restaurant", which would become the center of modern Iraqi protests. The square also connects to al-Khilani Square which is 500 meters away from it.

The area was called "al-Tahrir" in relation to freedom from British colonialism, as a result the square has been associated with freedom and political demonstrations. The square is located in front of al-Jumhuriya Bridge. On the left is the Tigris Primary School for girls, and al-Aqeeda High School for Girls. On the right is the former Turkish Restaurant building. The square is surrounded by several bookstores, including al-Nahda Library.

=== Nasb al-Hurriyya ===
One of the most notable aspects of the square is the Nasb al-Hurriyya ("The Freedom Monument) which is located on the eastern side of the square just behind the main garden of the square. The monument includes protruding sculptures to continue a sculpting tradition of ancient Iraqi civilizations including Babylonian, Assyrian, and Abbasid eras. The number of monument's parts is fourteen, which was done on purpose by its creator, Jawad Saleem, to represent the 14 July Iraqi coup of 1958. Which includes 25 figures, including an ox and a horse. The monument is supposed to highlight Iraqi freedom since the Ottoman Empire days.

=== Al-Umma Garden ===
The garden at the square was first established by King Ghazi and was originally known as the Garden of King Ghazi, later changed to al-Umma Garden ("Garden of the Nation") and is recognized as one of the most important features of the square. It is surrounded on both sides by the Nasb al-Hurriyya monument, and a large painting done by Iraqi artist Faiq Hassan. Both were established after the 1958 Iraqi coup. A third artistic sculpture called "The Mother Statue" is also located in the garden. Due to the artistic nature of the garden, it is recognized as a cultural center in the city and part of its social life. The garden also includes small lakes and several plants that were planted over the years of its existence.

== History ==
=== Historical background ===
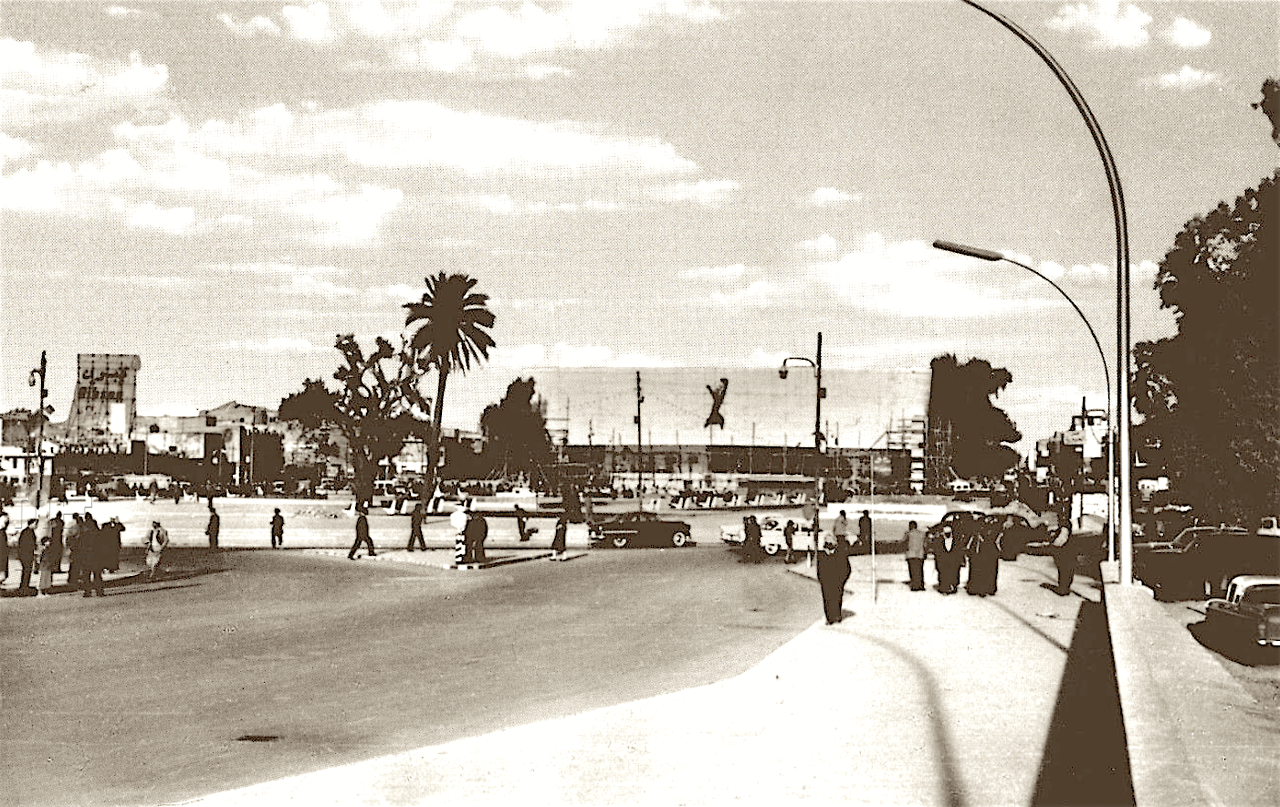
Al-Tahrir Square in 1960. Note the unfinished monument.

The area that became al-Tahrir Square was first established in 1937 during the Royal era where a roundabout was built. The monument, known as Nasb al-Hurriyah is located here which celebrates Iraqi history by depicting key events leading up to the creation of a republic. The monument, designed by the leading Iraqi sculptor Jawad Saleem and architect, Rifat Chadirji, opened in 1961. Al-Tahrir Square was the center of Baghdad while al-Rashid Street was the main avenue of the city.

On 27 January 1969, fourteen people, who were convicted of being Zionist spies and traitors by the ruling Ba'ath Party at the time, were hanged publicly in front of thousands of spectators in the square and was aired on TV, and their bodies were left dangling in the square publicly. The event made national headlines and Iraqi radio praised the event and congratulated the government on its "revolutionary" action. Public executions would become common in the square with full radio and television coverage.

The square was also a location for young artists and painter to paint about freedom and a good life in Iraq. Graffiti on walls showcasing women reflected thoughts about women rights in the country, as well as other social roles.

=== Protests and demonstrations after 2003 ===
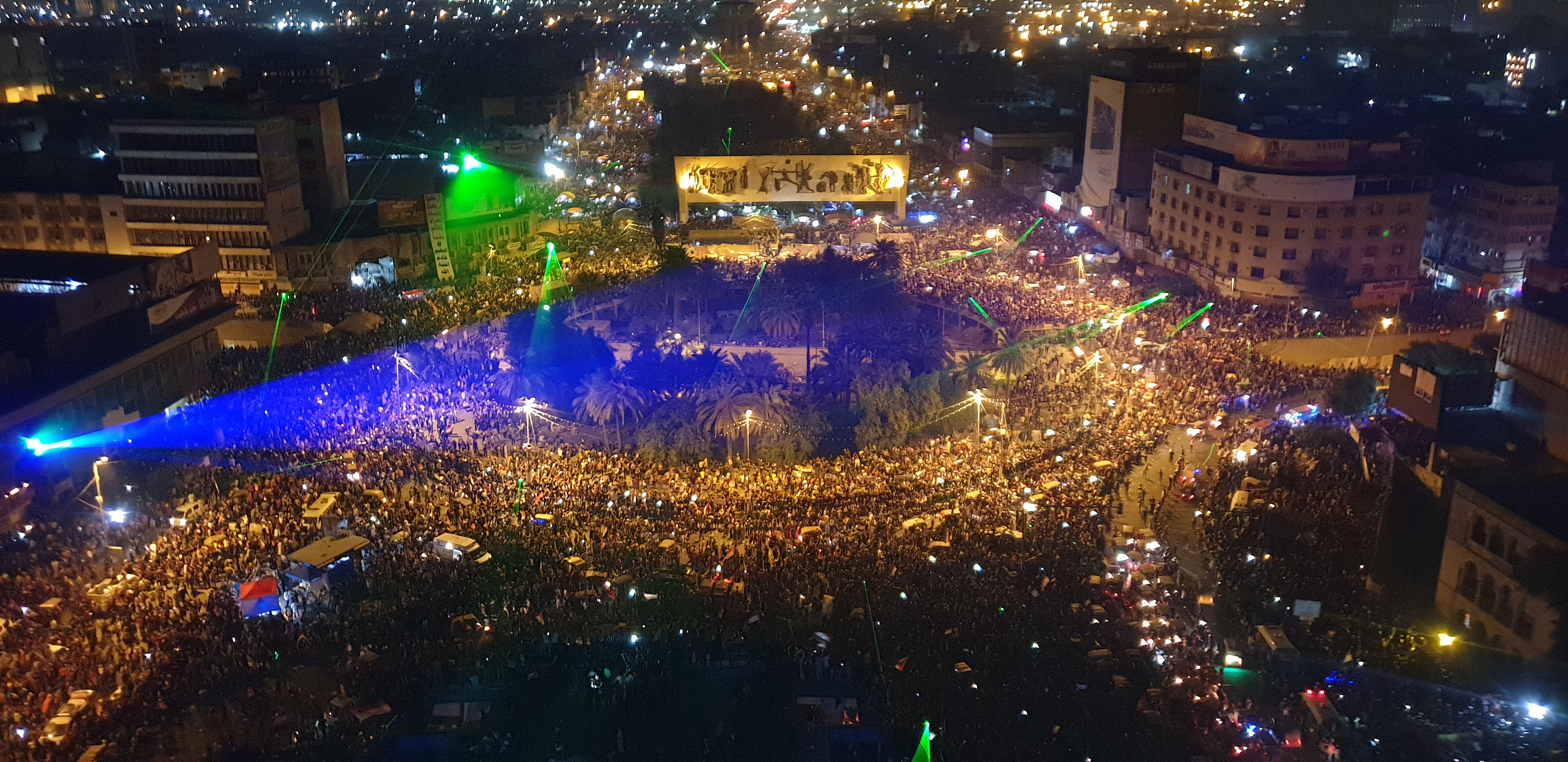
Nighttime view of the 2019 protests in the square. The demonstrations started in the square on the first of October, 2019.

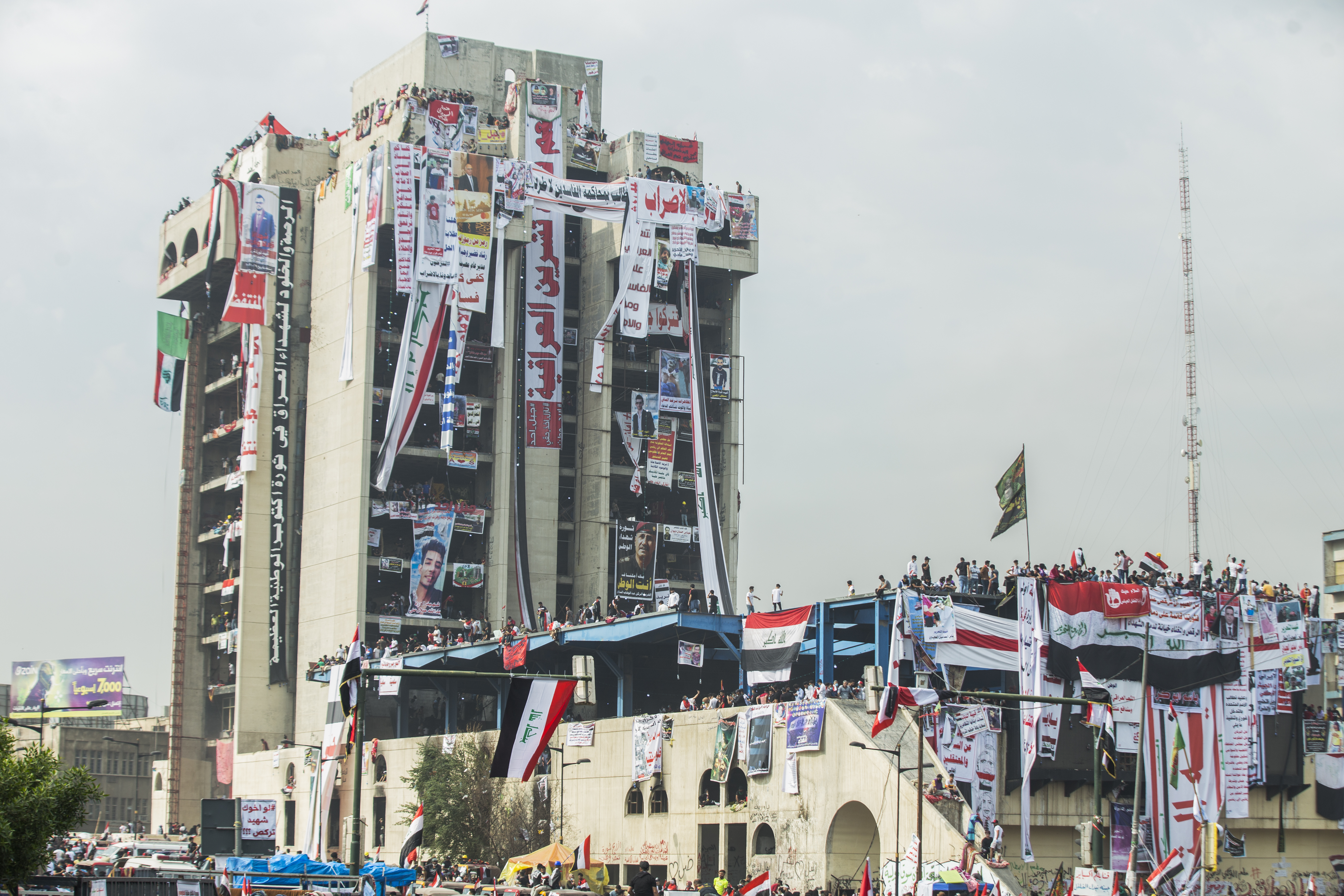
The Turkish Restaurant covered in banners and Iraqi flags during the 2019 protests.

Al-Tahrir Square was the epicenter of the unrest of the October 2019 Iraqi protests. The protests began on the first of October of 2019 over high unemployment, poor basic services, such as daily electricity cuts, and state corruption. Hundreds of protestors refused to leave the square for months until they can get their human rights. The protest contained diverse people, including protestors who embraced tradition and those who were "raised on social media", from all generations. Around the square are two streets where elementary elements and ambulances can be reached. Participants in the protest, mainly women, cooked and made bread for the protestors free of charge and also offered food for visitors for free. Many protestors also slept in the Turkish Restaurant and kept an eye on security forces. Transportation in the square was only provided by Tuk-Tuks, driven by people under the age of 18 and became one of the icons of the demonstrations. The Turkish Restaurant was taken over after fears that snipers would use the building to target the protests materialized. The buildings became filled with banners supporting the demonstrators and Iraqi flags and became an icon of the protests. The building was compared and nicknamed to Mount Uhud by the protestors, which witnessed the Battle of Uhud in which Muslims left the mountain before the end of the fighting, sustaining heavy losses.

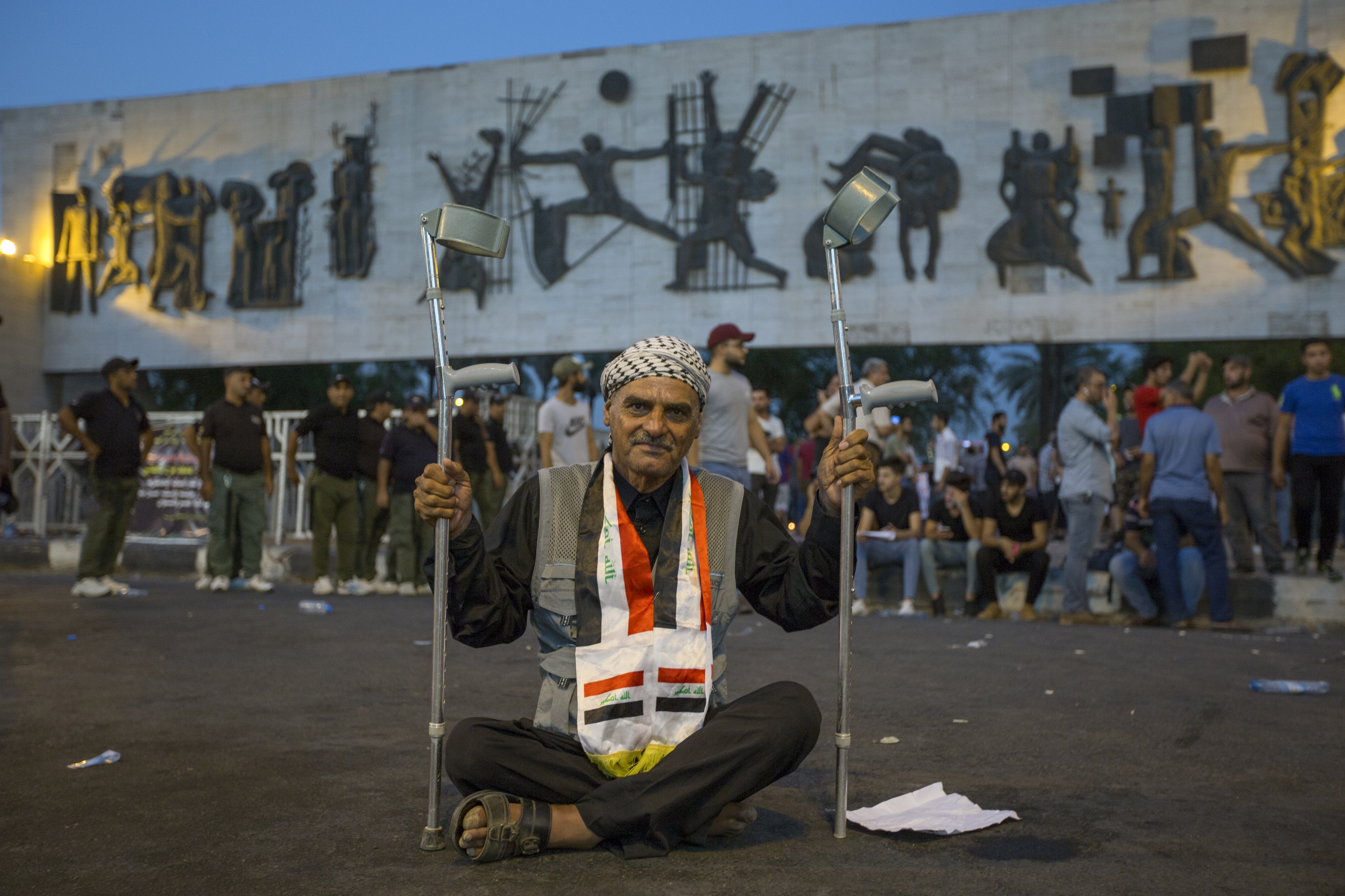
A disabled demonstrator puts his crutch facing the riot police during the 2019 protests.

On 16 November 2019, at least four protesters were killed and nearly 20 were injured as a car bomb attack took place at the Square. No group claimed responsibility for the first explosion in the ongoing anti-government protests. When the protest reached its 1-year mark on the first of October, 2020, protesters who gathered in al-Tahrir Square were sighted raising pictures of more than 600 people who died and injuries to 26,000 others since the beginning of the protests in 2019 in Baghdad and across southern Iraq.

On 22 July, 2023, Iraqi protesters chose the square as the epicenter of protests denouncing the burning of the Qu'ran outside the Iraqi embassy in Copenhagen, Denmark. Participants of the protest had reportedly attempted to cross the nearby al-Jumhuriya Bridge to proceed toward the Danish Embassy, which led the Iraqi police to deploy tear gas on the protestors. After pushing back protesters, authorities have closed the bridge to traffic. On July On 13 October 2023, thousands of Iraqis gathered in the square, waving Palestinian flags and burning Israeli flags while chanting anti-Israeli and anti-American slogans.

== See also ==
- Al-Maidan Square
- Iraqi conflict
