= Politics of Iraq =

Republic of Iraq جُمْهُورِيَّة ٱلْعِرَاق (Arabic) Jumhūriyyat al-ʿIrāq
- Polity type: Federal parliamentary constitutional republic
- Constitution: Constitution of Iraq

Legislative branch
- Name: Council of Representatives
- Type: Bicameral (de jure); Unicameral (de facto)
- Meeting place: Green Zone, Baghdad
- Presiding officer: Haibat al-Halbousi, Speaker of the Council of Representatives
- Upper house
- Name: Federation Council
- Lower house
- Name: Council of Representatives
- Presiding officer: Haibat al-Halbousi, Speaker of the Council of Representatives
- Appointer: Indirect election

Executive branch
- Head of state
- Title: President of Iraq
- Currently: Nizar Amidi
- Appointer: Council of Representatives
- Head of government
- Title: Prime Minister of Iraq
- Currently: Ali al-Zaidi
- Appointer: President of Iraq
- Cabinet
- Name: Council of Ministers
- Current cabinet: Al-Zaidi Government
- Leader: Ali al-Zaidi
- Appointer: Prime Minister of Iraq
- Ministries: 23

Judicial branch
- Name: Supreme Judicial Council
- Court of Cassation
- Chief judge: Faiq Zaidan (Note: Head of Supreme Judicial Council ex officio)
- Federal Supreme Court
- Chief judge: Ibrahim Mundhir Hussein

According to the constitution adopted in 2005, the Republic of Iraq is defined as a federal democratic parliamentary republic. Executive power is exercised by the Prime Minister of Iraq who heads the Council of Ministers (i.e. the federal government). The President of Iraq is the head of state with largely ceremonial powers, while legislative and judicial power is vested in the Council of Representatives and Supreme Judicial Council respectively.

The Economist Intelligence Unit rated Iraq an "authoritarian regime" in 2023. The Regimes of the World index rated Iraq 2024 an electoral autocracy.

== System of government ==
=== Overview ===
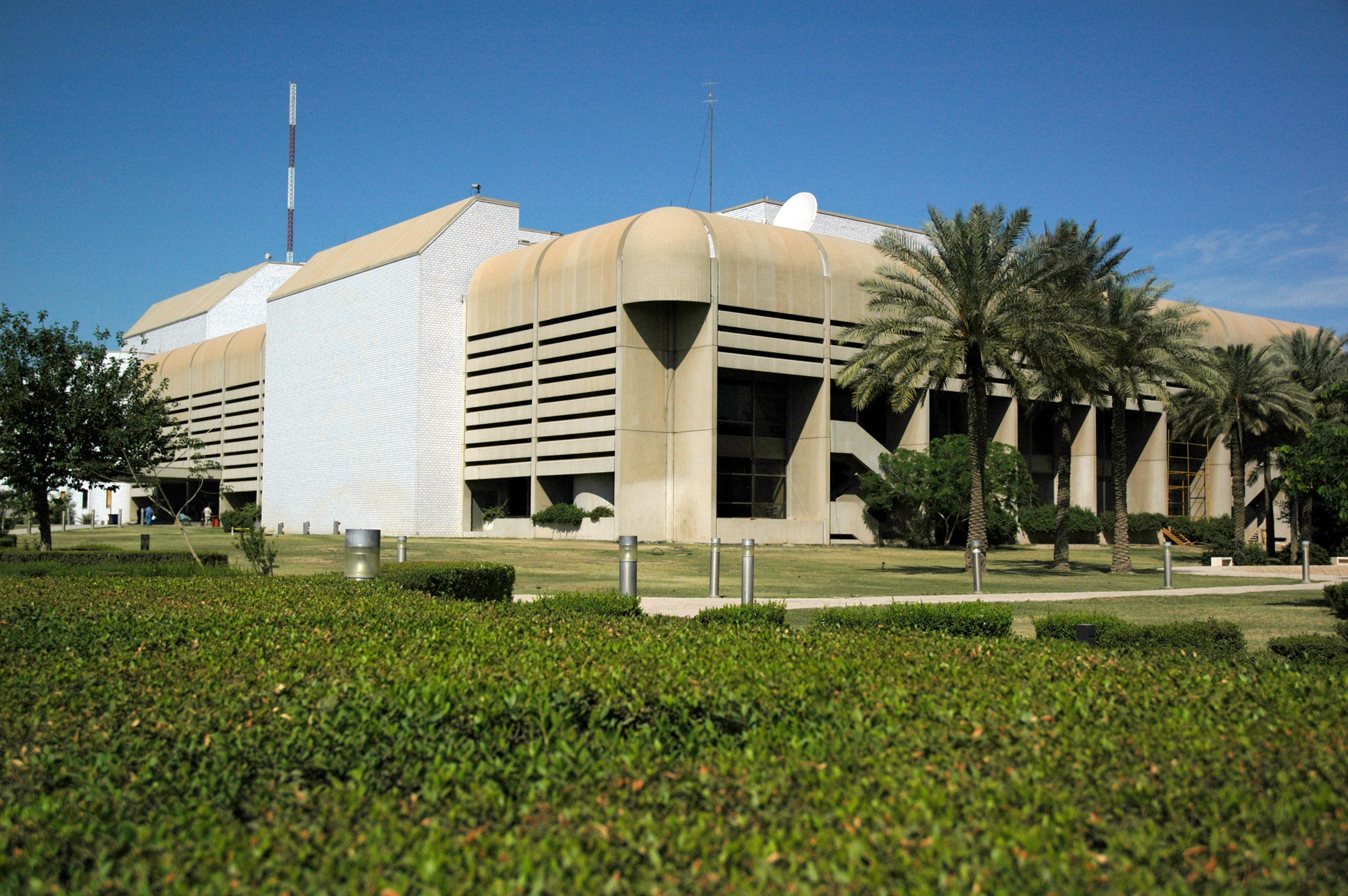
Council of Representatives of Iraq

The Republic of Iraq is defined under the current constitution as a democratic, federal parliamentary republic. The system of government is composed of the executive, legislative, and judicial branches, as well as numerous independent commissions. Islam is the official religion of the state and a foundation source of legislation, and no law may be enacted that contradicts its established provisions; furthermore, no law may be enacted that contradicts the principles of democracy or those basic rights and freedoms stipulated in the constitution. The current constitution provides for decentralisation according to which the federal regions have their own branches of government and governorates can exercise a degree of autonomy, but are governed by the provisions of the constitution of Iraq.

=== Executive branch ===
The executive branch is represented by the Council of Ministers headed by the Prime Minister. The President of the Republic is not part of the council of ministers and is not the head of any executive organ, but whose constitutional duty is mainly in naming the prime minister immediately after election and thereafter working under the command of the prime minister who is in charge of forming the government, formulating the general policy of the State and acting as the commander-in-chief of the armed forces.

=== Legislative branch ===
The legislative branch is composed of the Council of Representatives and a Federation Council. As of August 2012, the Federation Council had not yet been convened.

==== Council of Representatives ====
The Council of Representatives is the main elected body of Iraq. The Constitution defines the "number of members at a ratio of one representative per 100,000 Iraqi persons representing the entire Iraqi people." The members are elected for terms of 4 years.

The council elects the President of Iraq; approves the appointment of the members of the Federal Court of Cassation, the Chief Public Prosecutor, and the President of Judicial Oversight Commission on proposal by the Higher Juridical Council; and approves the appointment of the Army Chief of Staff, his assistants and those of the rank of division commanders and above, and the director of the intelligence service, on proposal by the Cabinet. Since 2021, Iraq's judiciary has enjoined total autonomy in appointing the judges of the Federal Supreme Court of Iraq and the approval of the president of the republic or the council of representatives is not required.

==== Federation Council ====
The Federation Council will be composed of representatives from the regions and the governorates that are not organized in a region. The council is to be regulated by law by the Council of Representatives. As of February 2026, the Federation Council had not yet been convened.

=== Judicial branch ===
The federal judiciary is represented by the Supreme Judicial Council of Iraq. The apex courts of Iraq are the Court of Cassation, and the Supreme Court. The judiciary is also composed of the Public Prosecution Department, the Judiciary Oversight Commission, and other federal courts that are regulated by law. One such court is the Central Criminal Court.

==== Supreme Judicial Council ====
The Supreme Judicial Council manages and supervises the affairs of the federal judiciary. It oversees the affairs of the various judicial committees, nominates the Chief Justice and members of the Court of Cassation, the Chief Public Prosecutor, and the Chief Justice of the Judiciary Oversight Commission, and drafts the budget of the judiciary. In 2013, the Council of Representatives passed the Iraqi Federal Court Act, which forbids the Chief Justice of the Supreme Court from also being the head of the Judicial Council, and replaced him with the Chief Justice of the Court of Cassation.

==== Court of Cassation ====
According to the Judicial Authority Law of 1963, the Court of Cassation is the apex court in ordinary law. The Court of Cassation is the supreme judicial body for all civil courts. It is headquartered in Baghdad and consists of a president, a sufficient number of vice-presidents, permanent judges, not less than fifteen permanent judges, delegated judges or rapporteur judges as needed.

==== Supreme Court ====
The Supreme Court is an independent judicial body that interprets the constitution and determines the constitutionality of laws and regulations. It settles disputes amongst or between the federal government and the regions and governorates, municipalities, and local administrations, and settles accusations directed against the President, the Prime Minister and the Ministers. It also ratifies the final results of the general elections for the Council of Representatives. In November 2022, the president of the Supreme Judicial Council, Chief Justice Dr. Faiq Zaidan described the name “Federal Supreme Court” as a misnomer, and suggested that the name be changed to “Constitutional Court” befitting its authorities.

==== Central Criminal Court ====
The Central Criminal Court of Iraq is the main criminal court of Iraq. The CCCI is based on an inquisitorial system and consists of two chambers: an investigative court, and a criminal court.

=== Independent Commissions ===
The Independent High Commission for Human Rights, the Independent High Electoral Commission, and the Commission of Integrity are independent commissions subject to monitoring by the Council of Representatives. The Central Bank of Iraq, the Board of Supreme Audit, the Communications and Media Commission, and the Shiite Endowment Commission as well as the Sunni Endowment Commission are financially and administratively independent institutions attached to the Council of Ministers. The Martyrs Foundation and the Political Prisoners Foundation are attached to the Council of Ministers as well. The Federal Public Service Council regulates the affairs of the federal public service, including appointment and promotion.

=== Federalism in Iraq ===
==== Federalism law ====
Article 114 of the Constitution of Iraq provided that no new region may be created before the Iraqi National Assembly has passed a law that provides the procedures for forming the region. A law was passed in October 2006 after an agreement was reached with the Iraqi Accord Front to form the constitutional review committee and to defer implementation of the law for 18 months. Legislators from the Iraqi Accord Front, Sadrist Movement and Islamic Virtue Party all opposed the bill.

==== Federal regions ====
The constitution requires that the Council of Representatives enact a law which provides the procedures for forming a new region 6 months from the start of its first session. A law was passed 11 October 2006 by a unanimous vote with only 138 of 275 representatives present, with the remaining representatives boycotting the vote. Legislators from the Iraqi Accord Front, Sadrist Movement and Islamic Virtue Party all opposed the bill.

Under the law, a region can be created out of one or more existing governorates or two or more existing regions, and a governorate can also join an existing region to create a new region. A new region can be proposed by one third or more of the council members in each affected governorate plus 500 voters or by one tenth or more voters in each affected governorate. A referendum must then be held within three months, which requires a simple majority in favour to pass. In the event of competing proposals, the multiple proposals are put to a ballot and the proposal with the most supporters is put to the referendum. In the event of an affirmative referendum a Transitional Legislative Assembly is elected for one year, which has the task of writing a constitution for the Region, which is then put to a referendum requiring a simple majority to pass. The President, Prime Minister and Ministers of the region are elected by simple majority, in contrast to the Iraqi Council of Representatives which requires two thirds support.

The northern Kurdistan Region emerged in 1992 with its own local government and parliament officially recognised in 2005 following the adoption of the new constitution.

=== Local government ===
The basic subdivisions of the country are the federal regions and governorates. Both regions and governorates are given broad autonomy with regions given additional powers such as control of internal security forces for the region such as police, security forces, and guards.

==== Provinces ====
Iraqi Governorates

Iraq is divided into 19 governorates, which are further divided into districts:

1. Baghdād (بغداد)
2. Salāh ad-Dīn (صلاح الدين)
3. Diyālā (ديالى)
4. Wāsit (واسط)
5. Maysān (ميسان)
6. Basra (البصرة)
7. Dhī Qār (ذي قار)
8. Al-Muthannā (المثنى)
9. Al-Qādisiyyah (القادسية)
10. Bābylon (بابل)
11. Karbalā' (كربلاء)
12. Najaf (النجف)
13. Al-Anbar (الأنبار)
14. Nineveh (نينوى)
15. Dohūk (دهوك)
16. Arbīl (أربيل)
17. Kirkuk (كركوك)
18. Sulaymāniyah (السليمانية)
19. Halabja (حلبجة)

== Political parties ==
=== Parliamentary alliances and parties ===
- National Iraqi Alliance (mainly Shi'a Islamist)
  - Supreme Islamic Iraqi Council (al-Majlis al-alalith-thaura l-islamiyya fil-Iraq) – led by Ammar al-Hakim
  - Sadrist Movement – led by Muqtada al-Sadr
  - Islamic Dawa Party – Iraq Organisation (Hizb al-Da'wa al-Islami Tendeem al-Iraq) – led by Kasim Muhammad Taqi al-Sahlani
  - Islamic Dawa Party (Hizb al-Da'wa al-Islamiyya) – led by Nouri al-Maliki
  - Tribes of Iraq Coalition – led by Hamid al-Hais
  - Islamic Fayli Grouping in Iraq – led by Muqdad Al-Baghdadi
- Democratic Patriotic Alliance of Kurdistan
  - Kurdistan Democratic Party (Partiya Demokrat a Kurdistanê) – led by Massoud Barzani
  - Patriotic Union of Kurdistan (Yaketi Nishtimani Kurdistan) – led by Jalal Talabani
  - Kurdistan Islamic Union (Yekîtiya Islamiya Kurdistan)
  - Movement for Change (Bizutnaway Gorran) – led by Nawshirwan Mustafa
  - Kurdistan Toilers' Party (Parti Zahmatkeshan Kurdistan)
  - Kurdistan Communist Party (Partiya Komunîst Kurdistan)
  - Feyli Kurd Democratic Union (Yeketîa Demokrata Kurden Feylî)
  - Assyrian Patriotic Party
- Civil Democratic Alliance (secular, nonsectarian)
  - People's Party led by Faiq Al Sheikh Ali.
  - Iraqi Ummah Party led by Mithal Al-Alusi.
  - Iraqi Liberal Party
  - National Democratic Action Party
- Iraqi List (al-Qayimaal Iraqia) (mainly secular Shia)
  - Iraqi National Accord – led by Iyad Allawi
- The Iraqis – led by Ghazi al-Yawer (allegedly Sunni)
- Feyli Kurdish National Movement - led by Munir Haddad
- Iraqi Turkmen Front (Irak Türkmen Cephesi)) (same as Alliance of the Turkomen Front of Iraq?) (ethnic group of Iraqi Turkmen)
- National Independent Cadres and Elites (Shia)
- People's Union (Ittihad Al Shaab)
  - Iraqi Communist Party – led by Hamid Majid Mousa
- Islamic Kurdish Society – led by Ali Abd-al Aziz
- Islamic Labour Movement in Iraq
- National Democratic Party (Hizb al Dimuqratiyah al Wataniyah) – led by Samir al-Sumaidai
- National Rafidain List
  - Assyrian Democratic Movement (Zowaa Dimuqrataya Aturaya) – led by Yonadam Kanna
- Reconciliation and Liberation Bloc
- The Upholders of the Message (Al-Risaliyun)
- Mithal al-Alusi List
- Yazidi Movement for Reform and Progress

=== Other parties ===
- Communist Party of Iraq
- Worker-Communist Party of Iraq
- Leftist Worker-Communist Party of Iraq
- Alliance of Independent Democrats – led by Adnan Pachachi
- National Democratic Party – Naseer al-Chaderchi
- Green Party of Iraq
- Iraqi Democratic Union
- Iraqi National Accord
- Constitutional Monarchy Movement – led by Sharif Ali Bin al-Hussein
- Assyrian Patriotic Party – on the Democratic Patriotic Alliance of Kurdistan list
- Assyria Liberation Party
- Kurdistan Conservative Party
- Turkmen People's Party
- Iraqi Islamic Party – led by Ayad al-Samarrai
- Al Neshoor Party

=== Illegal parties ===
- Hizb ut-Tahrir
- Arab Socialist Ba'ath Party (Regional Command · National Command)

== Elections ==
=== Iraqi parliamentary election, January 2005 ===
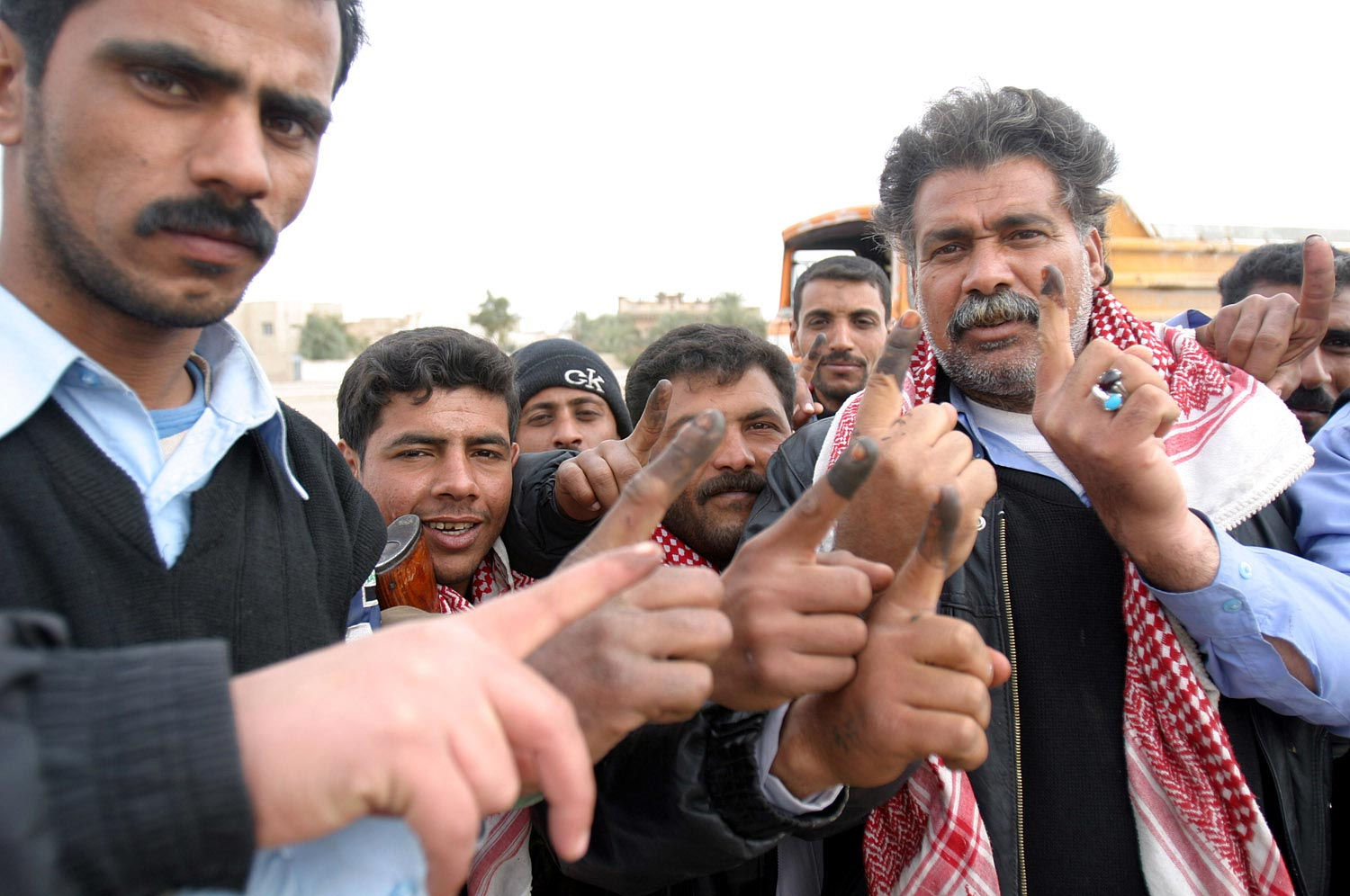
Iraqi police officers hold up their index fingers marked with purple indelible ink, a security measure to prevent double voting.

Elections for the National Assembly of Iraq were held on January 30, 2005, in Iraq. The 275-member National Assembly was a parliament created under the Transitional Law during the Occupation of Iraq. The newly elected transitional Assembly was given a mandate to write the new and permanent Constitution of Iraq and exercised legislative functions until the new Constitution came into effect, and resulted in the formation of the Iraqi Transitional Government.

The United Iraqi Alliance, tacitly backed by Shia Grand Ayatollah Ali al-Sistani, led with some 48% of the vote. The Democratic Patriotic Alliance of Kurdistan was in second place with some 26% of the vote. Prime Minister Ayad Allawi's party, the Iraqi List, came third with some 14%. In total, twelve parties received enough votes to win a seat in the assembly.

Low Arab Sunni turnout threatened the legitimacy of the election, which was as low as 2% in Anbar province. More than 100 armed attacks on polling places took place, killing at least 44 people (including nine suicide bombers) across Iraq, including at least 20 in Baghdad.

=== Iraqi parliamentary election, December 2005 ===
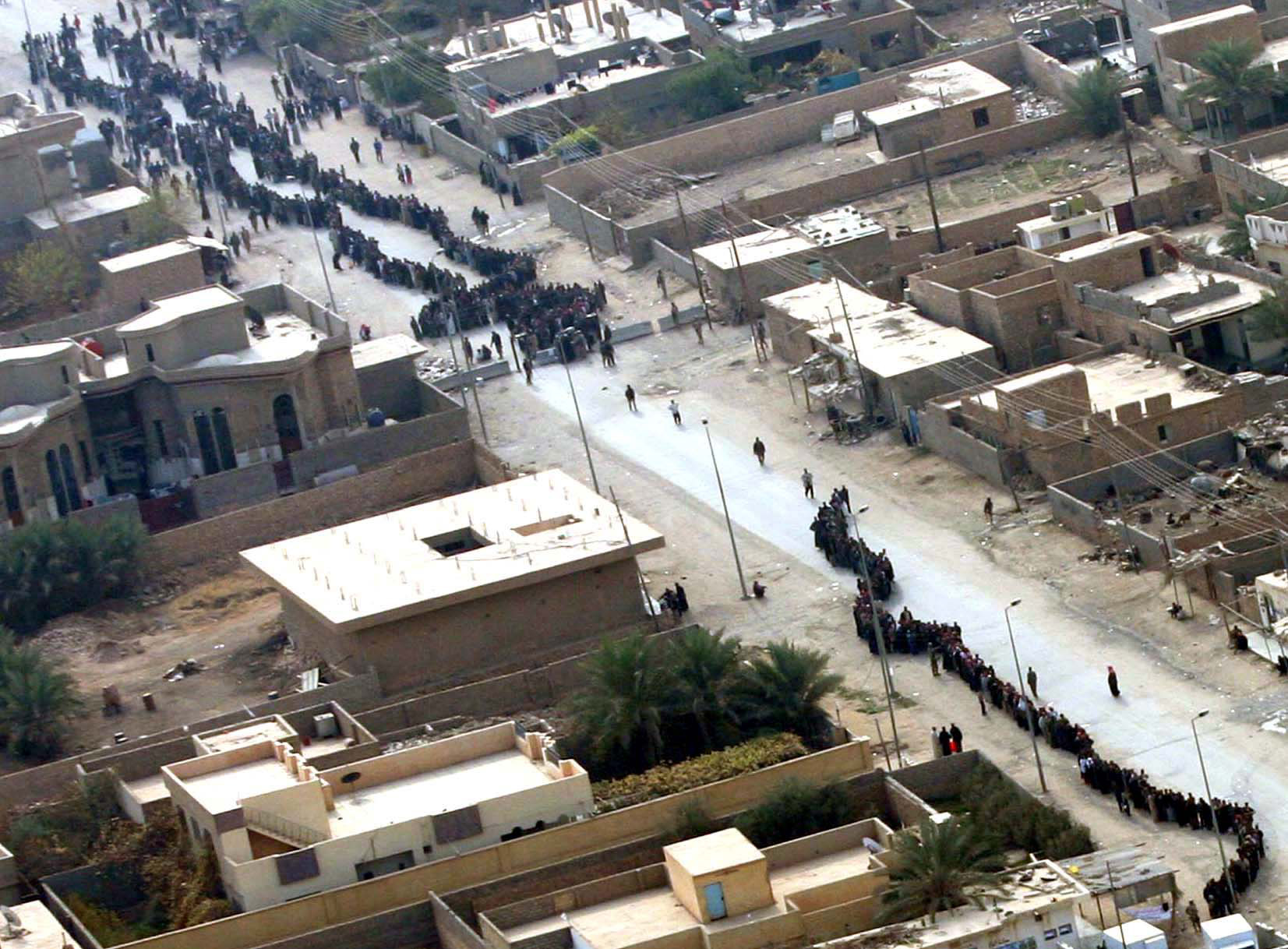
Iraqis in the predominantly Sunni city of Husaybah, wait in lines to vote during the national election.

Following the ratification of the Constitution of Iraq on 15 October 2005, a general election was held on 15 December to elect the permanent 275-member Iraqi Council of Representatives.

The elections took place under a list system, whereby voters chose from a list of parties and coalitions. 230 seats were apportioned among Iraq's 18 governorates based on the number of registered voters in each as of the January 2005 elections, including 59 seats for Baghdad Governorate. The seats within each governorate were allocated to lists through a system of Proportional Representation. An additional 45 "compensatory" seats were allocated to those parties whose percentage of the national vote total (including out of country votes) exceeds the percentage of the 275 total seats that they have been allocated. Women were required to occupy 25% of the 275 seats. The change in the voting system gave more weight to Arab Sunni voters, who make up most of the voters in several provinces. It was expected that these provinces would thus return mostly Sunni Arab representatives, after most Sunnis boycotted the last election.

Turnout was high (79.6%). The White House was encouraged by the relatively low levels of violence during polling, with one insurgent group making good on a promised election day moratorium on attacks, even going so far as to guard the voters from attack. President Bush frequently pointed to the election as a sign of progress in rebuilding Iraq. However, post-election violence threatened to plunge the nation into civil war, before the situation began to calm in 2007. The election results themselves produced a shaky coalition government headed by Nouri al-Maliki.

=== Iraqi parliamentary election, 2010 ===
A parliamentary election was held in Iraq on 7 March 2010. The election decided the 325 members of the Council of Representatives of Iraq who will elect the Iraqi Prime Minister and President. The election resulted in a partial victory for the Iraqi National Movement, led by former Interim Prime Minister Ayad Allawi, which won a total of 91 seats, making it the largest alliance in the council. The State of Law Coalition, led by incumbent Prime Minister Nouri Al-Maliki, was the second largest grouping with 89 seats.

The election was rife with controversy. Prior to the election, the Supreme Court in Iraq ruled that the existing electoral law/rule was unconstitutional, and a new elections law made changes in the electoral system. On 15 January 2010, the Independent High Electoral Commission (IHEC) banned 499 candidates from the election due to alleged links with the Ba'ath Party. Before the start of the campaign on 12 February 2010, IHEC confirmed that most of the appeals by banned candidates had been rejected and 456 of the initially banned candidates would not be allowed to run for the election. There were numerous allegations of fraud, and a recount of the votes in Baghdad was ordered on 19 April 2010. On May 14, IHEC announced that after 11,298 ballot boxes had been recounted, there was no sign of fraud or violations.

The new parliament opened on 14 June 2010. After months of fraught negotiations, an agreement was reached on the formation of a new government on November 11. Talabani would continue as president, Al-Maliki would stay on as prime minister and Allawi would head a new security council.

=== Iraqi parliamentary election, 2014 ===
Parliamentary elections were held in Iraq on 30 April 2014. The elections decided the 328 members of the Council of Representatives who will in turn elect the Iraqi President and Prime Minister.

=== Iraqi parliamentary election, 2018 ===
Parliamentary elections were held in Iraq on 12 May 2018. The elections decided the 329 members of the Council of Representatives, the country's unicameral legislature, who in turn will elect the Iraqi president and prime minister. The Iraqi parliament ordered a manual recount of the results on 6 June 2018. On 10 June 2018, a storage site in Baghdad housing roughly half of the ballots from the May parliamentary election caught fire.

=== Iraqi parliamentary election, 2021 ===
On 30 November 2021, the political bloc led by Shia leader Muqtada al-Sadr was confirmed the winner of the October parliamentary election. His Sadrist Movement, won a total of 73 out of the 329 seats in the parliament. The Taqadum, or Progress Party-led by Parliament Speaker Mohammed al-Halbousi, a Sunni – secured 37 seats. Former Prime Minister Nouri al-Maliki's State of Law party got 33 seats in parliament. Al-Fatah alliance, whose main components are militia groups affiliated with the Iran-backed Popular Mobilisation Forces, sustained its crushing loss and snatched 17 seats. The Kurdistan Democratic Party (KDP) received 31 seats, and the Patriotic Union of Kurdistan (PUK) gained 18.

==== After the election 2022–2025 ====
In June 2022, 73 members of parliament from the Sadrist movement, resigned. On 27 October 2022, Mohammed Shia al-Sudani, close ally of former Prime Minister Nouri al-Maliki, took the office to succeed Mustafa al-Kadhimi as new Prime Minister of Iraq.

=== Iraqi parliamentary election, 2025 ===
On 17 November 2025, the Iraqi Independent High Electoral Commission announced that the Reconstruction and Development coalition, led by Prime Minister Mohammed Shia al-Sudani, topped the final results with 46 seats in the 329-member Council of Representatives, followed by the Progress (Taqaddum) party of former Parliament Speaker Mohammed al-Halbousi with 36 seats, and the State of Law coalition of former Prime Minister Nouri al-Maliki with 29 seats. Subsequently, the Shia-led Coordination Framework declared that it had constituted itself as the largest parliamentary bloc by uniting its component parties, thereby positioning itself as a central force in government formation and parliamentary negotiations.

== Political issues ==
The Iraqi political system has been described as a sectarianized rentier state due to elitism, lobbying, corruption and identity politics. The main political issues in Iraq were economy and unemployment according to a 2025 Gallup poll.

=== Corruption ===
According to Transparency International, Iraq's is the most corrupt government in the Middle East, and is described as a "hybrid regime" (between a "flawed democracy" and an "authoritarian regime"). The 2011 report "Costs of War" from Brown University's Watson Institute for International Studies concluded that U.S. military presence in Iraq has not been able to prevent this corruption, noting that as early as 2006, "there were clear signs that post-Saddam Iraq was not going to be the linchpin for a new democratic Middle East."

=== Elite cartel ruling Iraq ===
During the regime of Saddam Hussein (1979–2003), several Iraqi opposition groups created a quota system by which Sunni Islamic, Shia Islamic, Kurdish and other religious or ethnic groups would be proportionally represented in a future new government. The U.S. in July 2003 selected the members of the Iraqi Governing Council, the forerunner of the first post–Hussein sovereign Iraqi interim government, according to that ethno-sectarian quota system. The quota system adopted by the ruling elite came to be realised in the manner that, for instance, the presidency be held by a Kurd, the premiership (head of government) by a Shia and the speakership of the parliament by a Sunni. In addition to this, ministries and state institutions were to be allocated in the same manner as well.

Also in 2003, a "pact" (muhasasa ta’ifa) was struck by "the elite", holding that after a national election, the winning parties divide the ministerial positions in direct relationship to their success at the ballot box. After 2003, a second agreement (muhasasa) was made, holding that ministries and their budgets and other political positions must be proportionally placed under the "control" of "religious [or sectarian or ethnic] groups", "depending mostly on a group's size", presuming such "groups" to be fully represented by one or several parties or lists taking part in the elections, or that national governments should "represent the different ethnic, religious and sectarian identities that make up the Iraqi society", presuming that such "identities" are expressed or represented by existing political parties. Such agreements between members of the elite to collude in order to avoid competition, improve their own profits, and dominate the market (of voters in a democracy), have been labeled "elite cartel". The political parties themselves, once they win any ministry through the muhasasa system, benefit financially from state contracts awarded by them to companies run by their party members (see below, section Clientelism, patronage) what makes it even harder for them to step out of the muhasasa arrangements. Or, as a researcher phrased it in 2020: "Such elite pacts are notoriously resistant to reform, particularly if any proposed change is perceived to undermine elite interests (…)".

Although the system functions informally, a group of Norwegian researchers in late 2020 asserted—while citing other researchers but not a basic source—that 54% of the ministry posts would 'normally' go to the Shia, 24% to the Sunni, 18% to the Kurds, and 4% to minorities including the Christians. They suggested that the muhasasa system leads to "a closed system of elite rule… recycling the political elites irrespective of their performance", not urging or inciting the Iraqi politicians to act transparently or accountably or to respond to citizen demands and deliver benefits to the Iraqi population as a whole, but instead making them easily susceptible to corruption, nepotism, clientelism and patronage while focusing on their own (group's) interests and (elite's) survival and consolidation.

This muhasasa elite cartel (and connected problems) led to massive protests in Iraq in 2011, 2012–2013, 2015, 2016, 2018 and 2019–2021. Analysts have seen this muhasasa system to exist until at least late 2020. The Abdul Mahdi Government of 2018 broke with elements of muhasasa. Although his anti-muhasasa Sadrist Movement retained plurality in the 2021 election, inability to form a government eventually led to the party's withdrawal from Parliament, allowing the rival parties to form another muhasasa-based government.

==== Incompetent government ====
Those two muhasasa agreements in and after 2003 (see above) had the effect that, starting with the first post–2003 Iraqi government after elections in 2006, if a party "controlled" a ministry, it appointed also the top positions in their civil services to their party followers and faction members; also the positions for senior public service were distributed on the basis of "ethnic, religious and/or party affiliation" rather than merit, professional competence or experience. This incompetence caused mismanagement in the successive Iraqi governments of Al-Maliki (2006–2014), Al-Abadi (2014–2018), and also Abdul-Mahdi (2018–2020), leading to hundreds of billions of dollars being wasted on failed projects and the neglect of electricity networks, the transportation sector, economic legislation, and other infrastructure, as well as citizen demands not being responded to. Such incompetence – next to other forms of political turmoil like corruption (see next subsection) and instability – is considered by many analysts to have also fostered the rise of ISIL, in 2014. (During the formation of the Abdul Mahdi Government in 2018, this new prime minister attempted to break through the traditional muhasasa procedures, but there's no clear information as to how far he succeeded in that, or whether the Iraqi governments since 2018 worked more competently or less corruptly.)

==== Clientelism, patronage ====
Civil services being staffed – under these muhasasa agreements (see above) – according to party loyalty had the effect that state contracts would only be awarded by them to "party-affiliated companies and businesspeople", who would be paid handsomely for their contracted services; even if they hardly, or not at all, actually delivered those services. Such manner of spending state finances has been labeled governmental contracting fraud and structural political corruption: not the general public but privileged companies were being served by the government. This culture of clientelism and "systemic political patronage" produced a new class of entrepreneurs, getting rich through close relations with government officials and their lush government contracts. Meanwhile, politicians themselves lived in wealth, self-enrichment and massive personal protection.

==== Stagnant economy ====
The infrastructure not being maintained or modernized due to governmental incompetence and mismanagement (see above) severely hampered the development of private economic activity, therefore meaning the private sector could not absorb the half million of young people entering the job market every year. This muhasasa-style 'cartel' government, due to its lack of accountability – politicians being "recycled ... irrespective of their performance" – provided too little incentives for those politicians to build a diversified and competitive economy or "deliver benefits to the population".

=== Lack of commitment towards federalism ===
Since the adoption of the new Iraqi constitution in 2005, federalism with a heavy emphasis on decentralisation has been the official model of governance in Iraq. However, certain constitutional stipulations, such as those related to the creation of the Federation Council (the upper house of the legislature) have not been implemented, which remains an issue undermining the full implementation of federalism in the country. In September 2017, a one-sided referendum was held in Iraq's Kurdistan Region regarding Kurdish independence, which resulted in 92% (of those participating in the region) voting in favor of independence. The referendum was rejected by the federal government and ruled as illegal by the Federal Supreme Court. Following this, an armed conflict ensued between the federal government and the Kurdistan Regional Government which resulted in Kurdish defeat and capitulation; Kurdistan Region subsequently lost territory it had previously occupied, and the president of Kurdistan Region officially resigned, and finally, the regional government announced that it would respect the Federal Supreme Court's ruling that no Iraqi province is allowed to secede, effectively abandoning its state building project. According to a report published by The Washington Institute for Near East Policy, a U.S-based think tank, since Kurdistan Region's failed bid to gain independence, the federal government has been severely punishing it both politically and economically. In gradual steps, the federal government has consistently weakened Kurdistan Region's ability to administer its own affairs by revoking crucial authorities that had previously defined its autonomy. Furthermore, since it won a pivotal ICC arbitration case, the federal government has also been refusing Kurdistan Region access to its most important source of income, namely, oil exports, and the latter has had no other option but to concede. Some have argued that this signals the Iraqi government's intention to abandon federalism and return to a centralized political system, and in a leaked letter sent in 2023 to the U.S president, the prime minister of Kurdistan region wrote of an impending collapse of Kurdistan Region.

== See also ==
- Assyrian politics in Iraq
- Censorship in Iraq
- History of Iraq (2003–2011)
- Reconstruction of Iraq
- Human rights in post-invasion Iraq
