= Languages of Iraq =

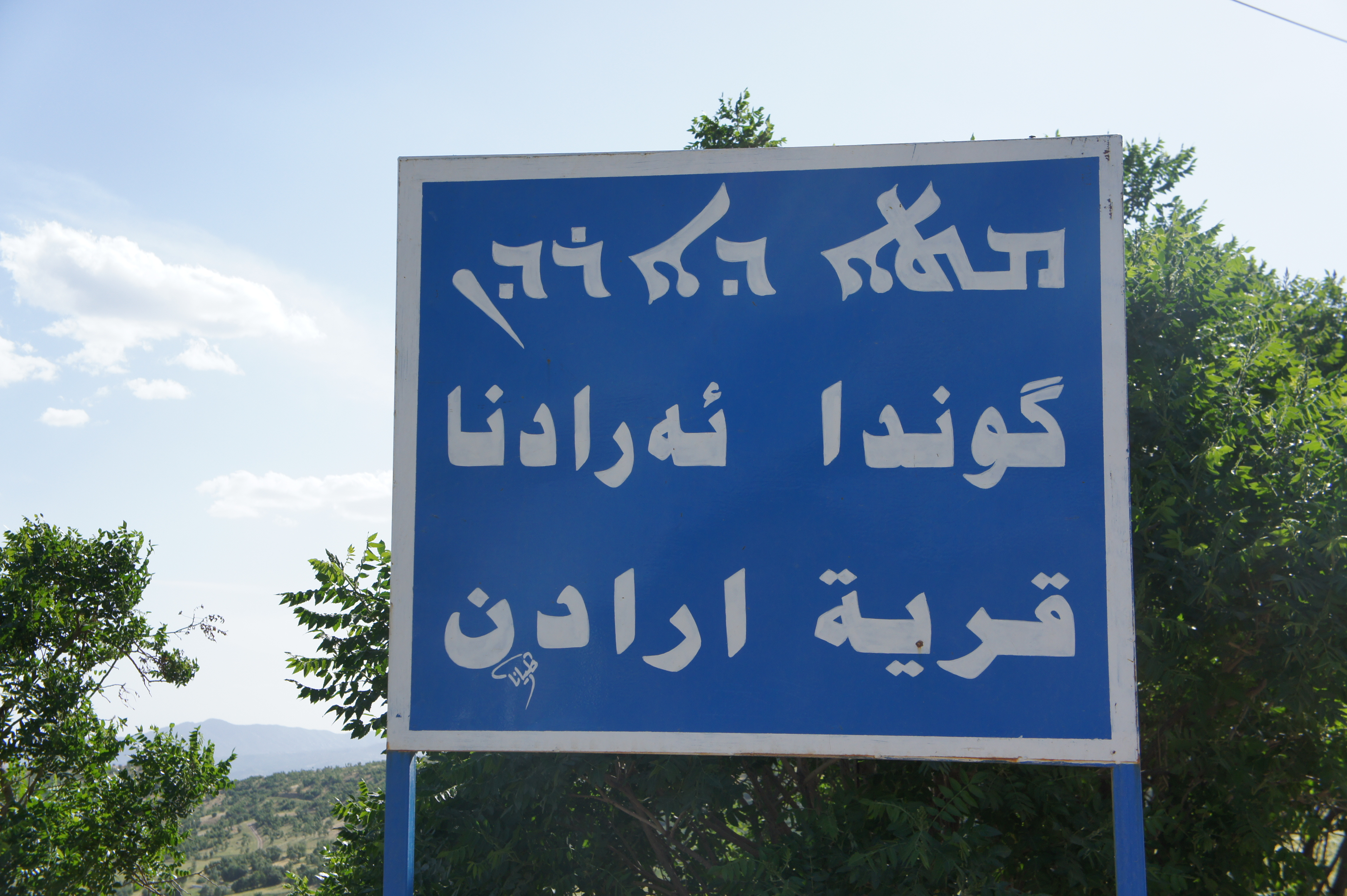
- Sign near Araden with text in Neo-Aramaic, Kurdish and Arabic
- Official: Arabic and Kurdish
- Vernacular: Mesopotamian Arabic
- Minority: Persian, Turkmen, Northeastern Neo-Aramaic and Classical Syriac, Armenian and Domari
- Foreign: English
- Signed: Iraqi Sign Language
- Keyboard layout: Arabic keyboard

There are a number of languages spoken in Iraq, but the lingua franca -- Mesopotamian Arabic (also known as Iraqi Arabic) -- is by far the most widely spoken in the country.

== Contemporary language ==
The most widely spoken language in Iraq is the Arabic language (specifically Mesopotamian Arabic); the second most spoken language is Kurdish (mainly Sorani and Kurmanji dialects), followed by the Iraqi Turkmen/Turkoman dialect of Turkish, and many Northeastern Neo-Aramaic dialects.

Standard Arabic is written using the Arabic script but Mesopotamian Arabic is written with a modified Perso-Arabic script and so is Kurdish (see Sorani alphabet). In 1997 the Iraqi Turkmen/Turkoman adopted the Turkish alphabet as the formal written language and by 2005 the community leaders decided that the Turkish language would replace traditional Turkmeni (which had used the Arabic script) in Iraqi schools. In addition, the Neo-Aramaic languages use the Syriac script.

Other smaller minority languages include Shabaki and Armenian.

=== Official languages ===
Official languages of Iraq are defined by the Constitution of Iraq, that was adopted on September 18, 2005, by the Transitional National Assembly of Iraq. It was confirmed by constitutional referendum, held on October 15, 2005. Official text of the Constitution was published on December 28, 2005, in the Official Gazette of Iraq (No. 4012), in Arabic original, and thus came into force. The official translation (in English, for international use) was produced in cooperation between Iraqi state authorities and the United Nations' Office for Constitutional Support.

According to the Article 4 of the Constitution, Arabic and Kurdish are the official languages of Iraq, while three other languages: Turkish, Neo-Aramaic and Armenian, are recognized as minority languages. In addition, any region or province may declare other languages official if a majority of the population approves in a general referendum. According to the second clause of the same article, a law that formally defines the status of Kurdish as an official language has to be passed, but as of March 2025, no such law has been enacted. The official status of Kurdish in Iraq (excluding Kurdistan Region) remains unclear.

== History ==
The oldest recorded languages of Iraq were Sumerian language and Akkadian language (including ancient Assyrian and Babylonian). Sumerian was displaced by Akkadian by 1700 BCE, and Akkadian was gradually displaced by Aramaic, from 1200 BCE to 100 CE. Sumerian and Akkadian (including all ancient Assyrian and Babylonian dialects) were written in the cuneiform script from 3300 BCE onwards. The latest positively identified Akkadian text comes from the first century CE.

The language with the longest recorded period of use in Iraq is Aramaic, which has a written tradition dating back for more than 2000 years, and survives today in its descendants, the Neo-Aramaic languages.

== Sources ==
- Brock, Sebastian P. (1989). "Three Thousand Years of Aramaic Literature". ARAM Periodical. 1 (1): 11–23.
- Khan, Geoffrey (2007). "Aramaic in the Medieval and Modern Periods" (PDF). Languages of Iraq: Ancient and Modern. Cambridge: The British School of Archaeology in Iraq. pp. 95–114.
- Naby, Eden (2004). "From Lingua Franca to Endangered Language: The Legal Aspects of the Preservation of Aramaic in Iraq". On the Margins of Nations: Endangered Languages and Linguistic Rights. Bath: Foundation for Endangered Languages. pp. 197–203. ISBN 9780953824861.
