= Medhat al-Mahmoud =

Iraqi judge

Medhat al-Mahmoud مدحت المحمود
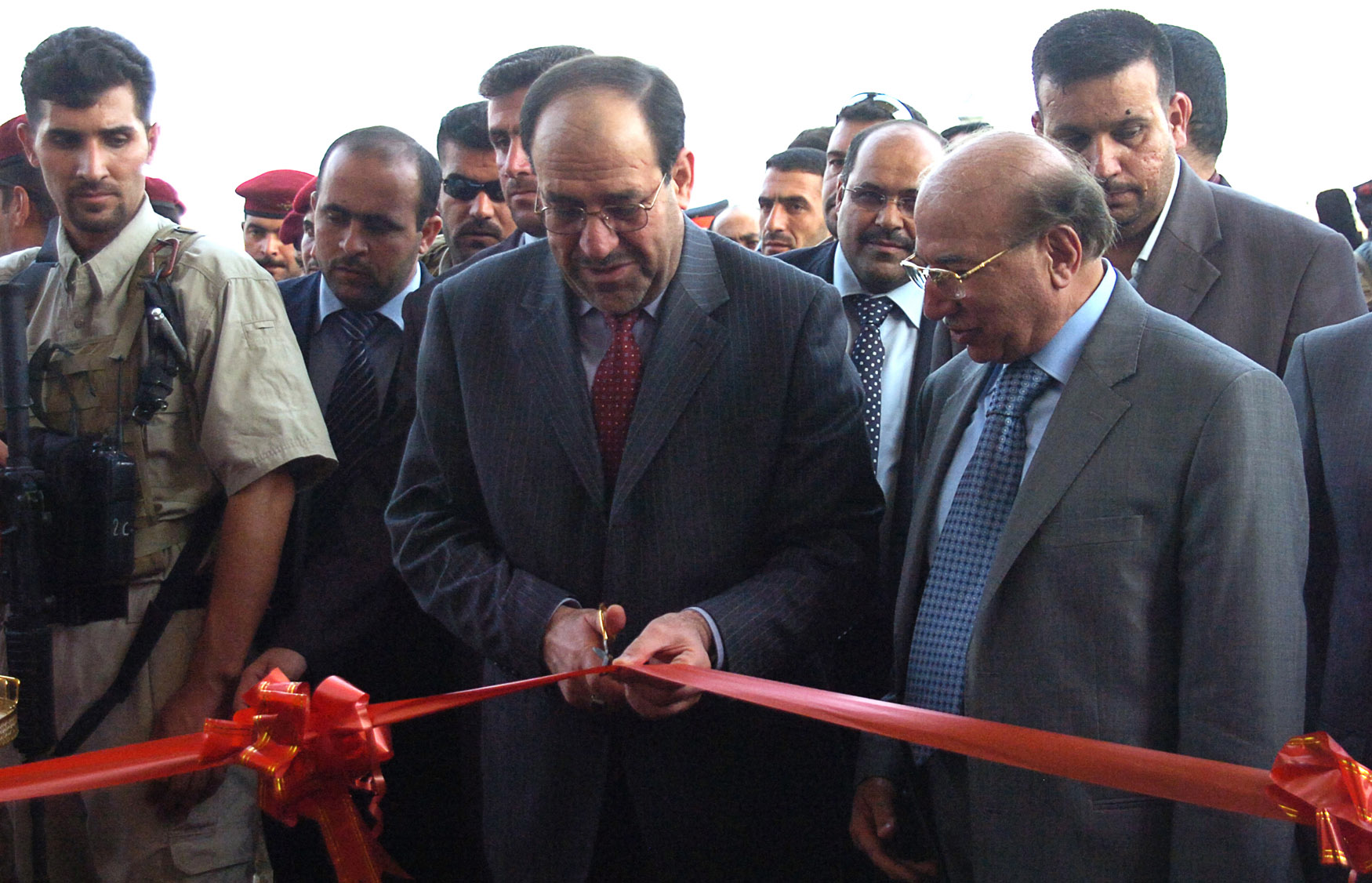
- Medhat al-Mahmoud (right) with Prime Minister Nouri Al-Maliki

Chief Justice of the Federal Supreme Court
- In office March 30, 2004 – March 24, 2021
- Preceded by: position created
- Succeeded by: Jassim al-Umayri

Head of the Supreme Judicial Council
- In office March 30, 2005 – February 2013
- Preceded by: position created
- Succeeded by: Hassan Ibrahim Humairi

Chief Justice of Court of Cassation
- In office ? – March 30, 2004
- Succeeded by: Faiq Zaidan

Personal details
- Born: September 21, 1933 (age 93) Rusafa, Baghdad, Kingdom of Iraq
- Education: College of Law, University of Baghdad

Military service
- Allegiance: Iraq
- Branch/service: Iraqi Army

Medhat al-Mahmoud (born September 21, 1933) is an Iraqi retired judge who served as the former head of the Iraqi Supreme Judicial Council and of the Federal Supreme Court. He retired in March 2021.

== Early career ==
Mahmoud was born and grew up in Rusafa, attending both primary and high school in Baghdad, before attending the College of Law at Baghdad University, which he graduated from as part of the class of 1959 as top of his class. After being admitted to the bar, he practiced law and also served as a reserve officer in the Iraqi Army. In 1960 he was appointed as a Judicial Investigator for the Department of Justice, and was later appointed as a Judge in 1968 after passing a competency examination. As a judge he served in numerous places in central Iraq, including Ar Rifa`i, Qalat Sukur, Musayyib, the Juvenile Court in Baghdad, as well as the Courts of First Instance in Kadhimiya and Baghdad.

== Post-invasion career ==
Following the 2003 U.S. invasion of Iraq al-Mahmoud was made a supervisor, or minister, for the Ministry of Justice by the Coalition Provisional Authority on 12 June 2003. He was later appointed Vice President of the Court of Cassation, before being appointed as Chairman of the Federal Court of Cassation. On 3 March 2005 he was appointed as Chairman of the Federal Supreme Court as well as head of the Supreme Judicial Council, a body responsible for the oversight of all courts across Iraq.

He was removed from his position as Head of the Supreme Judicial Council in February 2013 following the passing of a new law preventing the Head of the Federal Supreme Court from simultaneously holding the position of Head of the Supreme Judicial Council.

In mid February 2013 Iraq's Justice and Accountability Committee decided to remove al-Mahmoud from his role as Chairman of Iraq's Federal Supreme Court. Mahmoud then filed a successful appeal to the cassation panel, which failed to find any strong evidence of ties to the previous regime, and rejected al-Mahmoud's dismissal.

In 24 March 2021, following the amendment of the Federal Supreme Court Law which included a clause that defined the maximum age of a member of the Court as 72, al-Mahmoud retired and was succeeded by Jassim al-Umayri.
