= Disarmament of Iraqi militias =

The disarmament of Iraqi militias predominantly involves Shia militias in Iraq, many of which have received long-standing support from Iran through the Islamic Revolutionary Guard Corps. Following the collapse of Iraqi security forces during the Islamic State offensive in 2014 and a fatwa issued by Ali al-Sistani, the Popular Mobilisation Forces was formed as an umbrella group of Iraqi militias which played a key role in defeating ISIS, but it became controversial due to allegations of war crimes, political autonomy, and a lack of accountability. Although incorporated into Iraq’s security framework under PMF Commission Law No. 40 in 2016, several militias retained independent command structures and close ideological ties to Iran. A 2025 attempt to further institutionalise the PMF as a permanent, semi-autonomous force failed, amid concerns over sovereignty, leading to renewed pressure for militia disarmament and state control. In 2025, Iraq’s Shia Coordination Framework proposed a plan to disarm six Iranian-backed militias in partial response to US demands, with all concerned groups reportedly agreeing except for Kataeb Hezbollah.

== Background ==
Since the Islamic Revolution, Iran has sought to back Shia Islamist paramilitary organisations across the Middle East. Through Iran’s Revolutionary Guards and the elite Quds Force these militias received arms, training and financial support. In Iraq the Iranian-backed militias include Kataib Hezbollah, Asaib Ahl al Haq, Harakat Hezbollah al Nujaba, Badr Organization, and Kataib Sayyad al Shuhada.

In 2014, Iraqi armed forces collapsed in the face of the battle with ISIS, which conquered one third of Iraq's territory, including its second largest city, Mosul. Prime Minister Nouri al-Maliki gave the order to assemble these militias and others under a single paramilitary umbrella, and Shiite cleric Ali al-Sistani subsequently issued a fatwa calling for volunteers to exercise their duty to fight and defend Iraq against ISIS, after which these groups joined forces under the government paid organisation, the Popular Mobilisation Forces (PMF), which was dominated by the militias loyal to Iran. The PMF eventually succeeded in taking back most of the conquered territories in Iraq, though according to Amnesty International and Human Rights Watch it was guilty of committing war crimes, and since then has been viewed in Iraq as being unaccountable to the state or the rule of law.

In several regions of Iraq the militias assert their own control and are perceived by some as more effective than local authorities. Some units of the PMF retain an independent political structure, thereby preventing a unified chain of command, and militias have resisted full integration, maintaining autonomous operations tied to Iran's Islamic Revolutionary Guard Corps (IRGC) and carrying out attacks against coalition forces. As such, many of the militias were designated as terrorist groups by various governments worldwide.

== PMF Commission Law No. 40 ==
At the end of 2016, Iraqi parliament passed PMF Commission Law No. 40, according to which, the "Popular Mobilisation Committee" (PMC) was formed as a governing body for the PMF. The PMF was then incorporated into the Iraqi military, with a formal hierarchy of command, at the top of which stood the Iraqi Prime Minister as the Commander in Chief of the Armed Forces under country’s Constitution. Over time the law was expanded, formalising ranks, salaries and legality. A revised version of Law No. 40, including multiple provisions, was proposed by the Iraqi cabinet to the parliament in March 2025. According to the law's expanded version, the PMF would be legalised as a parallel Armed Force without being absorbed into the military, and its autonomy, both on the domestic and regional stages, would be formalised while being anchored within the state. This fixed ambiguous status would allow the militias to retain close ideological ties with Iran. Due to internal divisions and external pressure, the legislation ultimately did not pass.

The law was opposed by the US as it was said to cement Iran's influence in the region, turning the organisation into a permanent and financially independent ministry-like institution, allowed to intervene in Iraqi politics, economy and culture, thereby replicating the model of Iran’s Islamic Revolutionary Guard Corps, known for spreading its control over all walks of Iranian life. US secretary of state Marco Rubio is quoted as stating that if the legislation passed it "would institutionalize Iranian influence and armed terrorist groups undermining Iraq’s sovereignty". The opposition was amplified by the Human Right violations the PMF committed against civilians during the protests of 2019, And the attacks PMF affiliated groups conducted against the US military.

== The 2026 Nation Defense Authorization Act ==
In December 2025, the US senate passed a compromise version of the fiscal 2026 National Defense Authorization Act (NDAA), according to which Iraq must satisfy three conditions if it is to receive 75% of funds under the Coalition Train and Equip Fund (CTEF):

- The militias must be disarmed, demobililsed, and reintegrated into the Iraqi state.
- The militias must answer to the Iraqi prime Minister.
- If the militias break the law, they must be held accountable by the Iraqi government.

== Response and disarmament ==
In 2025, it was reported that the Shia Coordination Framework proposed a plan for the Iraqi government to disarm six Iranian-backed Iraqi militias, including Kataib Imam Ali and Kataib Hezbollah, thus partially complying with US demands. Reportedly, all groups but Kataeb Hezbollah, agreed to the plan.

On 18 December 2025, Shibl al Zaidi, leader of Iran-backed Iraqi militia Kataib Imam Ali called for all Iranian-backed militias in Iraq to disarm and integrate into the Iraqi state. This statement was viewed as an initial step towards the satisfying the first condition of the NDAA.

In December 2025, the head the Supreme Judicial Council in Iraq, Faiq Zidan, said that leaders of several armed factions had agreed to coordinate the restriction of weapons to state control and to supporting the rule of law. The pro-Iran militias Asaib Ahl al-Haq, Harakat Ansar Allah al-Awfiya, and Kataeb Imam Ali are reported as the groups who agreed to disarm, however they did not satisfy US demands by providing a binding commitment. In addition, Kataeb Hezbollah, one of the most prominent pro-Iran factions, refused to relinquish its weapons, and agreed to consider it only when foreign forces leave Iraq.

== See also ==
- Axis of Resistance
- Disarmament of Hezbollah
- Islamic Revolutionary Guard Corps
- Iranian intervention in Iraq (2014–present)
- Popular Mobilization Forces
- Kataib Hezbollah
- Asaib Ahl al Haq
- Harakat Hezbollah al Nujaba
- Badr Organization
- Kataib Sayyad al Shuhada
