= Hassan Ibrahim Humairi =

Hassan Ibrahim Hassan Hussein Humairi حسن ابراهيم حسن حسين الحميري

Head of the Supreme Judicial Council
- In office 2 May 2013 – 15 January 2017
- Preceded by: Medhat al-Mahmoud
- Succeeded by: Faiq Zaidan

Personal details
- Born: January 7, 1949 (age 77) Baghdad, Kingdom of Iraq
- Education: Al-Mustansiriya University

Hassan Ibrahim Humairi (born 7 January 1949) is an Iraqi judge who served as the head of the Supreme Judicial Council during 2013-2017.

== Early career ==
Mahmoud was born and grew up in Baghdad before attending the College of Law at Al-Mustansiriya University, which he graduated from on 1 July 1971. Humairi worked as a lawyer for several years before being accepted into the Judicial Institute. Following his graduation, he was appointed as a Judge by Presidential Decree.

== Post-invasion career ==
Following the 2003 invasion of Iraq, Humairi played a role in developing the idea of a mortgage in Iraq's new Civil Code.

He was appointed as the new Head of the Supreme Judicial Council in February 2013, due to a new law forbidding the head of the Federal Supreme Court from also Heading the Supreme Judicial Council. The exact mechanism used for appointing Humairi is unclear. He was later sworn into this role on 2 May 2013.
