= Jassim al-Umayri =

Iraqi judge

- جاسم العميري

Chief Justice of the Federal Supreme Court
- In office 15 May 2021 – 29 June 2025
- Preceded by: Medhat al-Mahmoud
- Succeeded by: Mundhir Ibrahim Hussein

Personal details
- Born: Jassim Muhammad Abboud Hammadi al-Umayri; 7 January 1964 (age 62) Diyala Governorate, Iraq
- Education: University of Baghdad (LL.B.); Second Military College; Judicial Institute, Baghdad (Higher Diploma)
- Occupation: Judge

Jassim Muhammad Abboud Hammadi al-Umayri (Arabic: جاسم محمد عبود حمادي العميري; born 15 May 1964) is an Iraqi former judge who served as the chief justice of the Federal Supreme Court of Iraq from May 2021 until his retirement in June 2025. His early retirement was reportedly due to health issues.

== Biography ==
According to his official biography, al-Umayri was born on 1 July 1964 in Diyala Governorate, Iraq, to a Shia Arab family. He graduated from the College of Law of the University of Baghdad on 30 June 1990, then the Second Military College in 1992 and the Judicial Institute in Baghdad on 30 July 2001.
