= Federation Council (Iraq) =

De jure upper house of Iraq

Federation Council مجلس الاتحاد (Arabic) ئەنجومەنی فیدراڵی (Kurdish)

Type
- Type: Upper house (de jure)

History
- Founded: Not convened yet
- Preceded by: Senate of Iraq; Revolutionary Command Council

Elections
- Redistricting: Independent High Electoral Commission

Constitution
- Constitution of Iraq (2005), Section II, Chapter I

The Federation Council of Iraq (Note: also known as the Council of Union in early constitutional drafts, or simply the Federal Council (Arabic: مجلس الاتحاد, romanized: Majlis al-Ittiḥād; Kurdish: کۆنسه‌یا فه‌ده‌راسیۆنێ, Konseya Federasyonê)) is the unconvened de jure upper house of the bicameral legislature of Iraq.

The constitution of Iraq defines the Federation Council as the upper chamber of Iraq's legislature composed of all governorates and federal regions, with intention of representation in the Parliament of Iraq. It also stipulates that the Federation Council is to be formed by a law passed by the Council of Representatives with two-thirds majority approval, but as of December 2025, no bill has established the upper chamber.

== Background ==
According to Article 65 of the Constitution:

A legislative council shall be established named the "Federation Council", to include representatives from the regions and the governorates that are not organized in a region. A law, enacted by a two-thirds majority of the members of the Council of Representatives, shall regulate the formation of the Federation Council, its membership conditions, its competencies, and all that is connected with it.

The Federation Council shall consist of elected officials from Iraq's federal regions and governorates, and its authorities is to be determined by a law enacted by the Council of Representatives.

== Debate ==
=== Supporting arguments ===
Proponents of the Federation Council (FC) have argued that:

- According to some proponents of the FC, Iraq's legislative system is "disjointed" and there's "internal competition or rivalry between the legislative institutions", with the Council of Representatives occasionally forcing contested laws into effect. Currently, even the president cannot block a bill from being passed regardless of whether he/she signs it.
- The FC can balance the proportional representation-based Council of Representatives by allowing for regions and governorates to be directly represented in legislative affairs.
- Some Sunni and Shia parties, and the Kurds are already starting to support the implementation.
- Despite the fact that 78.59% of voters chose to implement the current constitution of Iraq, some of its articles are yet to be implemented. This could have prevented the 2017 Kurdish independence referendum and consequently, the 2017 Iraqi–Kurdish conflict.
- The Council of Representatives has been criticised before for passing laws that further added tension between the federal government and the Kurdistan Region and between Iraq's three main components.
- The FC can function as a guarantor of decentralisation by ensuring that the Council of Representatives does not consolidate disproportionate power.
- Implementation of the FC can improve internal security of Iraq's governorates by passing legislation that allows for the devolution of internal security administration –such as law enforcement– to provincial authorities.
- Federalism in Iraq can only function properly when democratic institutions function as a bastion against a dictatorship of the majority.
- The FC can ensure the representation of Iraq's minorities in parliament.

=== Opposing arguments ===
Critics additionally also argued that:

- The FC may not be able to actually handle solving problems within Iraq as those who lead parties have a better say in Parliament rather than elected representatives.
- The FC might additionally be too expensive for the country's budget with little to no actual effect, explaining on why not many Iraqis are bothered with implementing the FC or even know about its existence.
