= Democracy in Iraq =

Democracy in Iraq is a fledgling process, but Iraq has achieved a more democratic approach than most surrounding countries. Iraq has a score of 3.51 out of ten on the 2021 The Economist Democracy Index, which is considered authoritarian. Iraq scored 0.362 on the V-Dem Electoral Democracy Index in 2023, ranking 3rd in the Middle East and 115th worldwide. Numerous wars, corruption, and civil and ethnic conflict in Iraq have made it difficult for a stable democratic government to emerge.

According to the Constitution of Iraq, the Iraqi government is a federal parliamentary representative democratic republic. It is a multi-party system whereby the executive power is exercised by the Prime Minister of the Council of Ministers as the head of government, as well as the President of Iraq, and legislative power is vested in the Council of Representatives. The Prime Minister of Iraq appoints the Council of Ministers, which acts as the cabinet.

== History ==
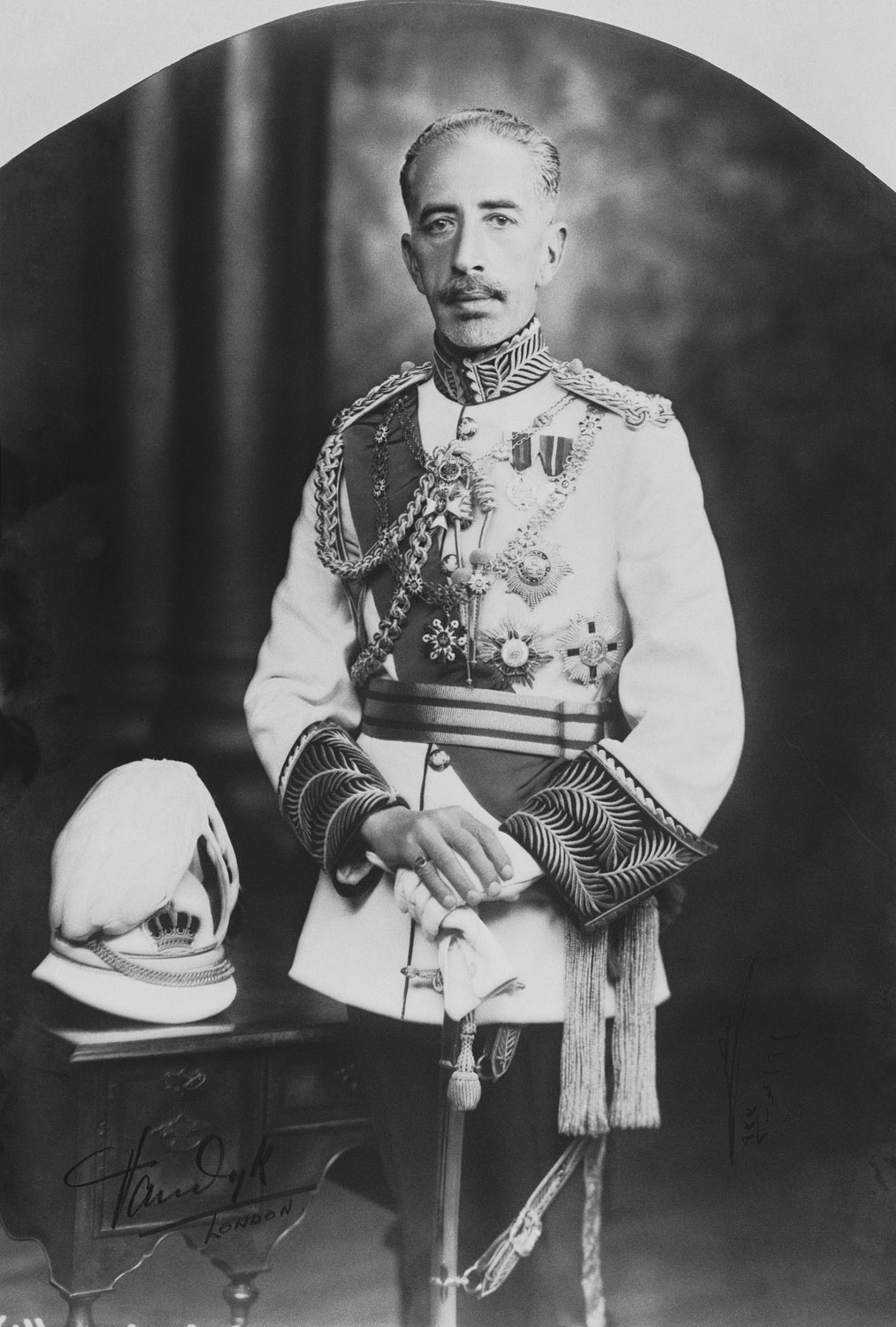
Faisal I, King of Iraq from 1921 to 1933

Iraq historically (before 2003) had been ruled by monarchs and dictators and had never been a democracy. For years, the Kurds had struggled for self-rule and independence from Iraq in what is known as the Iraqi–Kurdish conflict. In 1992, the Kurds formed their own government, the Kurdistan Regional Government.

From 1831 to 1917 Iraq was under the control of the Ottoman Empire. The British Empire defeated the Ottomans in 1917 and began ruling the country as the British Mandate of Iraq. Concerned at the unrest in the mandated country, the British decided to step back from direct administration and create a monarchy to head Iraq while they maintained the mandate. In March 1921, at the Cairo Conference, the British decided that a good candidate for ruling mandatory Iraq would be Faisal I because of his apparent conciliatory attitude towards the Great Powers and based on advice from T. E. Lawrence (more commonly known as Lawrence of Arabia). Thus, Britain had imposed a Hāshimite monarchy on Iraq and defined the territorial limits of Iraq without taking into account the politics of the different ethnic and religious groups in the country, in particular those of the Kurds and the Assyrians to the north. As a consequence, during the British occupation, the Shi'ites and Kurds fought for independence.

In 1932, the British granted independence to the Kingdom of Iraq. Faisal I ruled until his death in 1933, to be succeeded by his son, Ghazi I (1933–39), and Ghazi's son, Faisal II (1939–58).

In 1958, a coup d'état known as the 14 July Revolution was led by the Brigadier General Abd al-Karim Qasim. This revolt was strongly anti-imperial and anti-monarchical in nature and had strong socialist elements. Numerous people were killed in the coup, including King Faysal II, Prince Abd al-Ilah, and Nuri al-Sa'id. Qasim controlled Iraq through military rule and in 1958 he began a process of forcibly reducing the surplus amounts of land owned by a few citizens and having the state redistribute the land. He was overthrown by Colonel Abdul Salam Arif in a February 1963 coup. After the latter's death in 1966, he was succeeded by his brother, Abdul Rahman Arif, who was overthrown by the Ba'ath Party in 1968. Ahmed Hassan al-Bakr became the first Ba'ath President of Iraq but then the movement gradually came under the control of Saddam Hussein, who acceded to the presidency and control of the Revolutionary Command Council (RCC), then Iraq's supreme executive body, in July 1979. Iraq under Saddam Hussein was considered an authoritarian regime. The new regime modernized the countryside and rural areas of Iraq, mechanizing agriculture and establishing farm cooperatives. However, Hussein's ambition soon led him to be involved in various conflicts, with disastrous results to the infrastructure of Iraq. Hussein, a Sunni Arab, brutally repressed a Kurdish uprising during the Iran-Iraq war using chemical weapons and other indiscriminate means that killed 100,000-200,000 Kurds.

During the Cold War, the United States and the Soviet Union competed for allies in the Middle East which resulted in Iraq signing a 15 year Treaty of Friendship and Cooperation with the Soviet Union on 9 April 1972. According to historian Charles R. H. Tripp, the treaty upset "the US-sponsored security system established as part of the Cold War in the Middle East. It appeared that any enemy of the Baghdad regime was a potential ally of the United States."

=== American occupation (2003–2011) ===
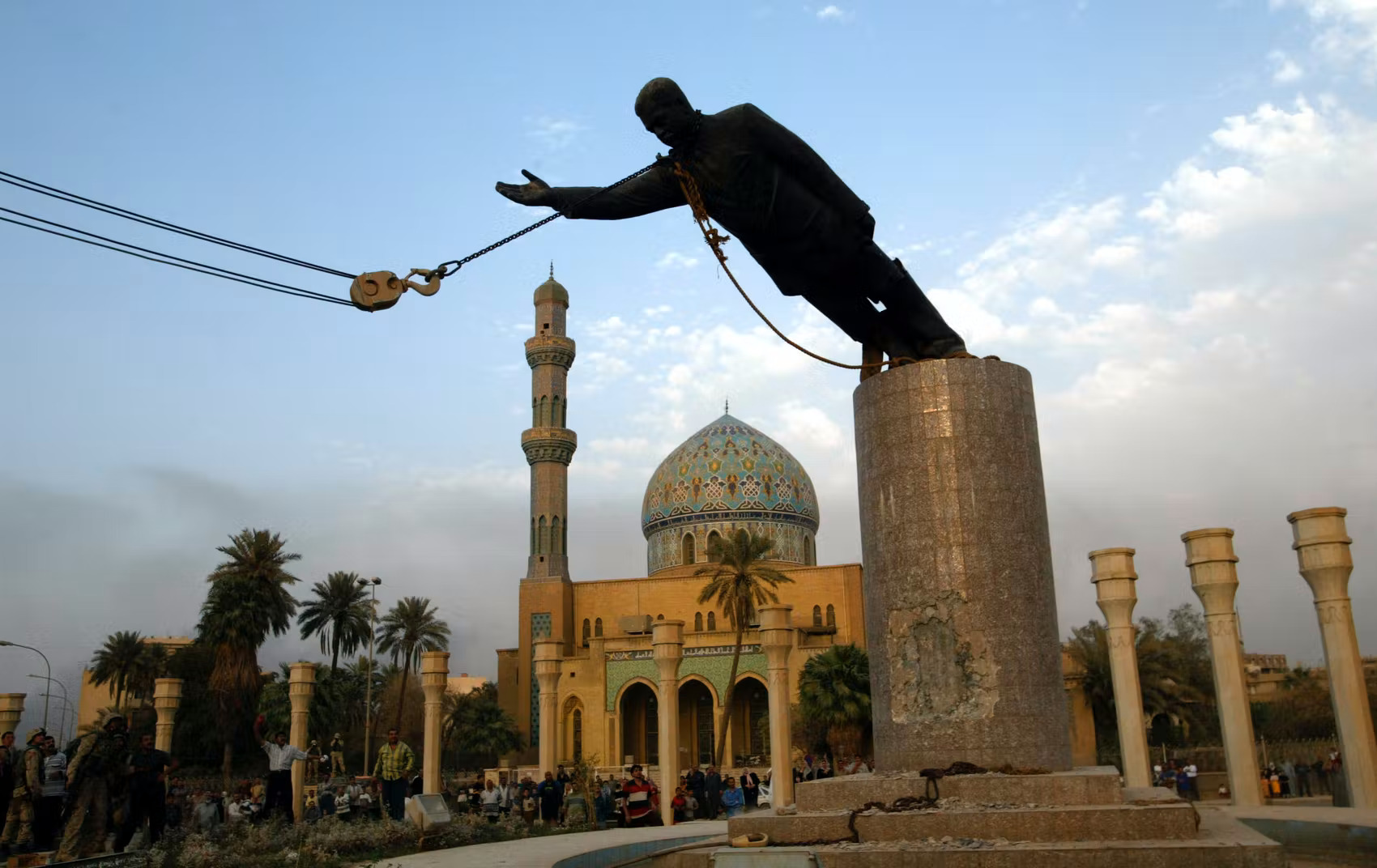
Statue of Saddam Hussein being toppled in Baghdad's Firdos Square in 2003

A U.S.-led invasion of Iraq in 2003 ousted Saddam Hussein's administration, for the purpose of eliminating weapons of mass destruction. Soon, the promotion of democracy became a second stated goal for the U.S. in Iraq.

From May 2003 until June 2004, the U.S.-led Coalition Provisional Authority (CPA) governed Iraq, which as of July 2003 was assisted by the Iraqi Governing Council, consisting of tribal leaders appointed by the CPA to provide advice to the CPA provisional government. In June 2004 the sovereignty over Iraq was handed over again from the U.S. to an Iraqi Interim Government led by Interim Prime Minister Ayad Allawi, and the Iraqi voters went to the polls in January 2005 to elect 275 MPs to the Iraqi Transitional Government's National Assembly. It was a transitory body tasked with writing the nation's constitution. A further election followed in December 2005 to select members of the permanent legislature.

These elections resulted in a "government of national unity"—which is a codeword for a government constructed along the muhasasa-system—in May, 2006, composed of the four largest parties in the 275-seat-Parliament: United Iraqi Alliance (UIA) (128 seats) which included all major Shi'a parties; the Kurdistan Alliance (DPAK) (53 seats) consisting of the main (ruling) parties of Iraqi Kurdistan; the Iraqi Accord Front (Tawafuq) (44 seats) consisting of Sunni Arab parties; and the Iraqi National List (25 seats), a secular party composed of both Sunnis and Shiites. However, insurgent attacks and other violence were common and protracted the country's instability.

Until (at least) 2008, parliamentary elections in Iraq were generally free and fair, with a high voter turnout, but were frequently marred by violence. The president of the republic, who has little real powers but can function as an informal mediator between different political groupings, is also chosen by the parliament.

Despite spending billions to promote democracy in Iraq, the United States' attempt to form a democratic government there is largely considered a failure and has been called "democratic disillusionment." A 2011 study Costs of War from Brown University's Watson Institute for International Studies concluded that democracy promotion has been flawed from the beginning in Iraq, noting as early as 2006 that "there were clear signs that post-Saddam Iraq was not going to be the linchpin for a new democratic Middle East." Corruption was rampant as the United States prepared to withdraw many of its combat troops.

=== 2011 protests ===
In 2011, as an effort to prevent potential unrest, Iraqi Prime Minister Nouri al-Maliki announced that he would not run for a third term and called for a constitutional term limit. Nevertheless, hundreds of protesters gathered in several major Iraqi urban areas on 12 February (notably Baghdad and Karbala) demanding a more effective approach to the issue of national security and investigation into federal corruption cases, as well as government action towards making public services fair and accessible. The protests resulted in at least 45 deaths, including at least 29 on 25 February 2011, the "Day of Rage".

=== War against the Islamic State (2013–2017) ===
The war by Iraq and its allies against the Islamic State has led to numerous human rights issues. Nearly 19,000 civilians were killed in Iraq in ISIL-linked violence between January 2014 and October 2015. ISIL executed up to 1,700 Shia Iraqi Air Force cadets from Camp Speicher near Tikrit on 12 June 2014. The genocide of Yazidis by ISIL has led to the expulsion, flight and effective exile of the Yazidi people from their ancestral lands in northern Iraq.

According to Newsweek, Amnesty International claimed that "Iraqi government forces and paramilitary militias have tortured, arbitrarily detained, forcibly disappeared and executed thousands of civilians who have fled the rule of the Islamic State militant group". The report, titled Punished for Daesh's crimes', alleges that thousands of Sunni men and boys have been forcibly disappeared by Iraqi government forces and militias.

=== 2019 protests ===
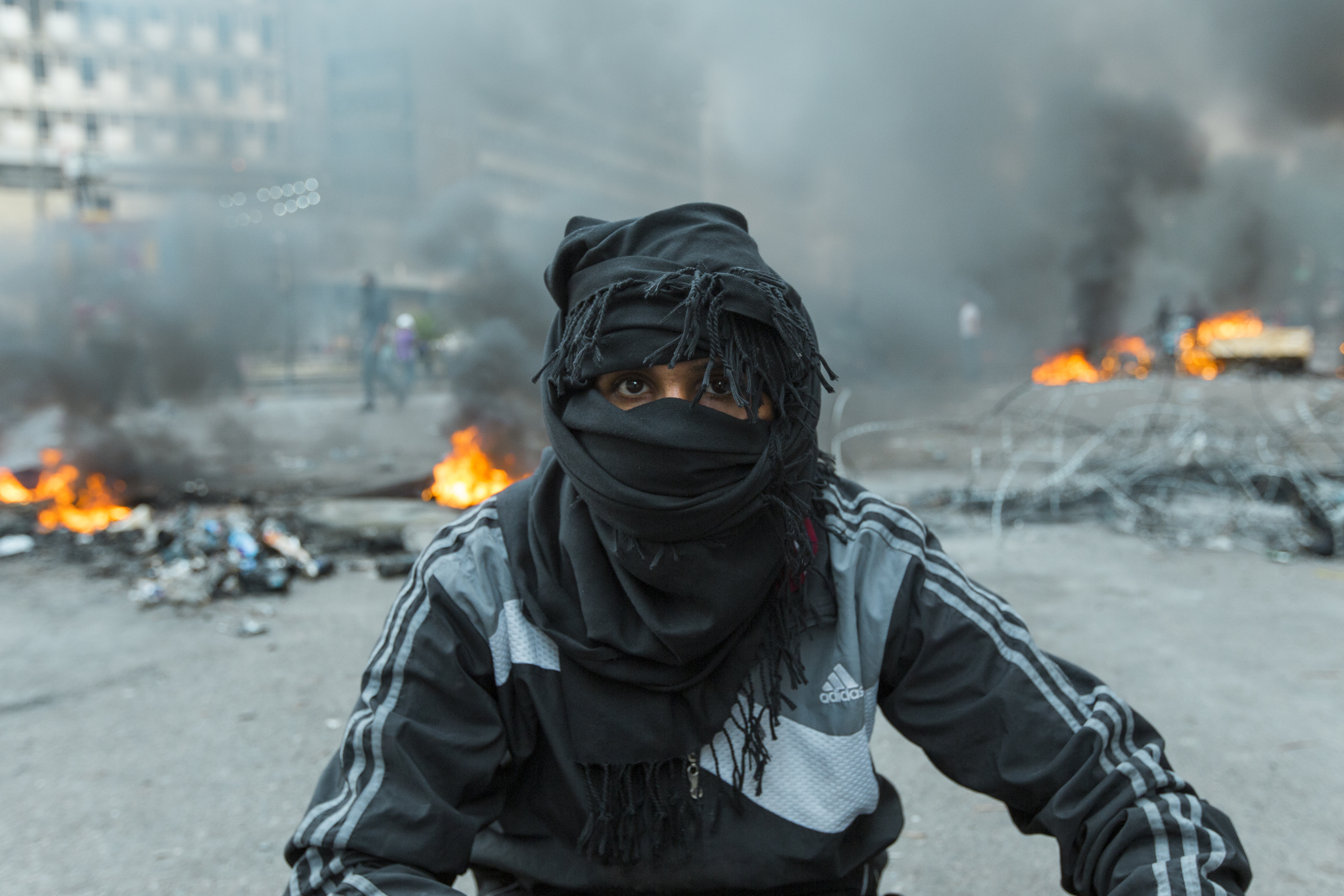
Protesters shutdown Al-Khulani Square in October 2019

In 2019, Iraq saw a series of protests consisting of demonstrations, marches, sit-ins and civil disobedience. It started on 1 October 2019, a date which was set by civil activists on social media, spreading mainly over the central and southern provinces of Iraq, to protest corruption, unemployment, political sectarianism, inefficient public services and interventionism. The protest then escalated into calls to overthrow the Iraqi government and soon forced the incumbent government to resign in December 2019, by which time more than 400 demonstrators had been killed and many more injured. Nationwide demonstrations persisted in Iraq throughout the first quarter of 2020, but momentum began to wane as exhaustion set in, and finally, the COVID-19 pandemic-related lockdown measures brought the movement to an end. Nonetheless, the protestors' key demands (improved governance, public services, and job prospects) have mostly remained unmet. The notion that the advantages of the country's significant oil riches are not being felt by regular Iraqis is at the core of the discontent, with the blame laid on corruption, both locally in Iraqi politics and internationally as a consequence of foreign influence. Iraq was mired in political stalemate for much of 2020, as rival political groupings battled to agree on a leader. Since the appointment of Mustafa Al-Kadhimi as Prime Minister on 7 May 2020 however, unnamed "prominent elements within Iraq's parliament" are alleged to have remained a stumbling block to any (unnamed) "reform progress". As a result, Iraq's lowest-scoring category is government functioning, with a score of zero. Iraq had the second-lowest score in the civil freedoms category, with a score of 1.18, down from 1.76 in 2019. The poor grade is due in part to lockdown limitations (which have had a global impact on civil rights), but it is also due to claims of increased usage of arbitrary detentions and allegations of torture being used to get confessions from suspected terrorists (including members of Islamic State and al-Qaida). Security personnel and armed militias, in particular, have been accused of employing oppressive techniques to quell protests, including the use of live bullets. Due to still-intermittent protest action, Iraq retains relatively high rankings in both the political involvement and political culture categories.

=== 2021–2022 political crisis ===
After Iraq's October 2021 parliamentary elections, it took twelve months to form a new Iraqi government: the longest such impasse since the 2003 U.S.-led invasion. The conflict was between the Sadrist Movement, supporters of the Shia religious leader Muqtada al-Sadr, and the Iran-backed Coordination Framework Alliance led by Nouri al-Maliki. The Council of Representatives of Iraq for a long time was unable to form a coalition government or elect a new President. The political unrest several times caused protests and violence in Baghdad, and was considered the most serious crisis in the country since the defeat of the Islamic State in the country in 2017, after which Iraq had had relative stability.

On 27 October 2022 though, the government of Prime Minister Mohammed Shia' Al Sudani, from the Coordination Framework alliance, was approved by the Council of Representatives.

=== Current status ===
On the 2023 V-Dem Democracy indices electoral democracy index, Iraq ranked 3rd in the Middle East and 115th worldwide. Iraq scored 0.362 on the V-Dem Democracy electoral democracy index in 2023. As of 27 October 2022, the Iraqi Prime Minister is Mohammed Shia' Al Sudani.

== Issues of political culture ==
=== Muhasasa political system ===
According to analysts and Iraqi protesters (see 2015–2018 Iraqi protests), the (democratic) politics of Iraq have since 2003 until at least late 2020 been dominated by a so-called muhasasa system, distributing the governmental positions over the "ethnic, religious and sectarian groups" of Iraq. Protesters and commentators have contended that that system has led to incompetent and corrupt government.

=== Gridlock, repression, authoritarianism ===
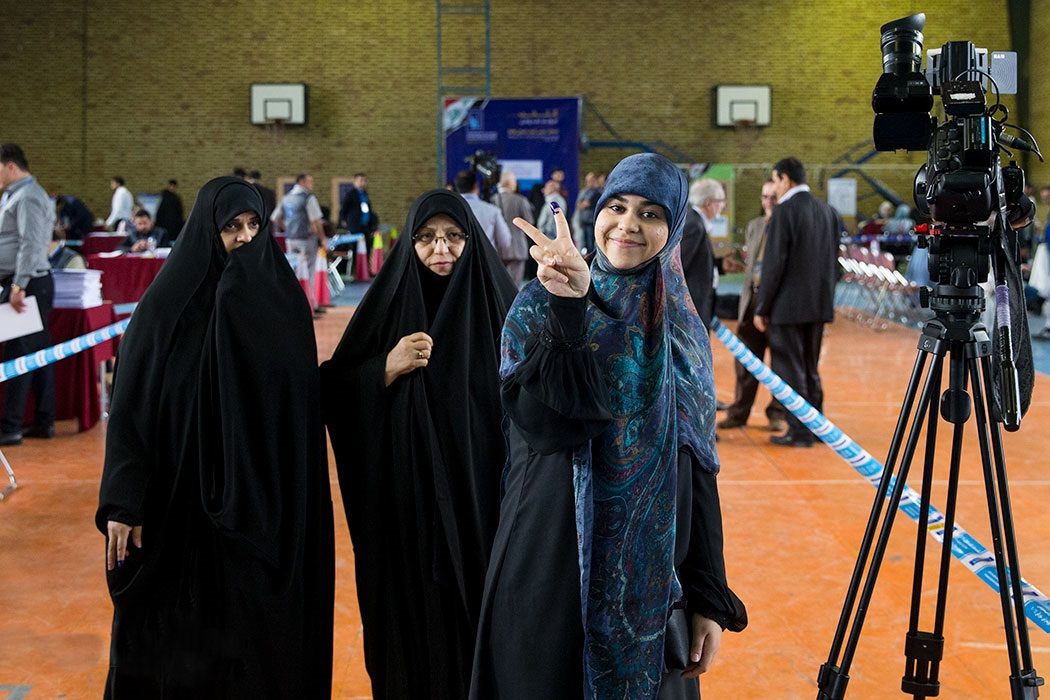
2018 Iraqi Parliamentary elections, a polling booth in Tehran (Iran)

On the Economist Intelligence Unit's Democracy Index, compiled by a UK-based private enterprise (publisher of The Economist) since 2006, Iraq in the years 2006 until 2018 was scored as to be a 'hybrid regime' with scores between 4 and 6 on a scale from 0 to 10 (that is in between 'flawed democracy' (scores 6 until 8) and 'authoritarianism'). But since 2019 until at least 2022, Iraq was being scored as 'authoritarian' (scores 0 until 4). The scores are based on answers to 60 questions answered by either experts or public opinion surveys. In 2020, when Iraq's overall score was 3.62, Iraq scored relatively high on political participation (6.67) and electoral process (5.25), thanks to its relatively free and fair elections. However, it scored zero (0) on the 'functioning of government' because of political gridlock through most of 2020 and elements in the Iraqi parliament blocking every form of political reform. Also very low was Iraq's score on 'civil liberties' (1.18), due partly to arbitrary detentions, allegations of torture in prisons, and violent repression of demonstrations by security forces.

=== Press freedom ===
In 2019, a survey held under 100 Iraqi journalists showed that 44% of Iraqi journalists avoided reporting on potential corruption, because of political parties controlling the content of their work; 10% explained that their media institution simply forbade the covering of corruption, 6% feared retaliation of authorities if they did report on corruption. Also non-state groups regularly attacked journalists in revenge for reporting on corruption: since the Iraqi regime change of 2003 until 2019, 277 Iraqi journalists and 63 media assistants had been killed.

Reporters Without Borders, a non-profit organisation based in France, since 2002 every year assesses the press freedom in all countries, in their Press Freedom Index. Iraq's score in the years 2018 until 2021 was between 43 and 48 (on a 100-point-scale), which qualified as "difficult". But in the year 2022, Iraq's score sank to 28.59 placing them in the lowest category qualified as "very serious". Of the five contributing indicators: social, political, legislative, economic and security, the last two gave especially very low scores in 2022: 'security' scored 18.27, 'economic' scored 20.07. On indicator 'Safety/security', the RWF report over 2022 stated: "…Journalists in Iraq face threats from all sides and come up against the weakness of the state, which is failing in its duty to protect them (…) In recent years, many journalists in Iraq have been killed by armed groups (…) Such killings rarely lead to investigations (…) Death threats and abduction are also often used to terrorise and silence journalists. High-profile journalists used to be the main targets of such intimidation but nowadays it is also used against lesser-known journalists". And on indicator 'Economic context': "Media funding is closely tied to political affiliation; the greater a political party's resources, the more influential its affiliated media outlet. Many media outlets have abandoned editorial independence because of a lack of funds, or have simply stopped operating (…)".

In 2020 until October, again four reporters in Iraq had been killed. Human Rights Watch, a U.S.-based non-governmental organization, is also closely criticizing the lack of engagement of Iraqi governments in safeguarding journalists and media organisations, who regularly report to have been attacked or threatened, even by state forces.

=== Corruption ===
In 2008, the U.S. anti-corruption coordinator in Baghdad stated that many Iraqi government officials considered the Iraqi corruption "a serious problem"; an Iraqi official had estimated the cost of Iraqi state corruption over the year 2007 at $18 billion. In a survey in 2019, 30% of Iraqis said that in more than 50% of the instances they needed a government official to perform a service for them, they were required to pay a bribe; 34% of respondents considered it acceptable to bribe to get a job or a promotion.

The Israeli–U.S. Middle East Media and Research Institute (MEMRI) in September 2020 citing The New York Times stated that the Iraqi Central Bank functioned as "the sewage system of Iraqi corruption" by its daily auctions of foreign currencies allowing Iraqi private banks to convert Iraqi dinars into dollars to finance imports by local businessmen. Most Iraqi political leaders, especially those associated with Iran, had established their own banks which they used for money laundering and channeling corruptly procured money into Iran. Other researchers have estimated in 2020 that between US $125 billion and $300 billion illegally acquired Iraqi money was held by Iraqis abroad. Another example of corruption, revealed in 2020: the previous Minister of Electricity ostensibly 'hired' 82,555 daily workers at a cost of about $12 billion, but most of those workers didn't really exist; the money presumably was pinched.

In May 2021, the Iraqi President Barham Salih estimated that 15% of the Iraqi oil revenues since the 2003 U.S. invasion of Iraq—which totalled about one thousand billion dollars—had been "stolen" and "smuggled out of Iraq" in corrupt deals and therefore he submitted a draft Corrupt Funds Recovery Act to the Iraqi Parliament.

Transparency International defines corruption as: "Abuse of entrusted power for private gain". Over the year 2010, Transparency International gave Iraq the score 1.5 on their Corruption Perceptions Index (showing a perception among experts and businesspeople), where 10 means 'very clean' and 0 means 'highly corrupt': at that time worldwide surpassed negatively only by Afghanistan, Myanmar and Somalia. In 2013, Iraq's score was nearly unchanged: 16 on a scale from 0 to 100. In the years up to 2021, Iraq's score improved to 23, which means that the Iraqi public sector was still seriously corrupt but improving. In 2022 again, Iraq's score was 23, leaving behind them 19 countries in the world performing worse on corruption while 156 countries were considered less corrupt.

== See also ==
- Federal government of Iraq
- Elections in Iraq
- Politics of Iraq
- History of Iraq
