= Foundation of Martyrs (Iraq) =

Government-owned foundation in Iraq

- مؤسسة الشهداء

Government agency overview
- Formed: January 1, 2005; 21 years ago
- Headquarters: Baghdad, Iraq
- Employees: More than 500
- Website: alshuhadaa.gov.iq

The Foundation of Martyrs (Arabic: مؤسسة الشهداء) is a governmental institution of the Iraqi Council of Ministers, established in 2005. Its mission is to deal with the general situation of the martyrs families and to compensate them materially and morally currently headed by Najeha Abdul-Amer al- Shemary.

== See also ==
- Politics of Iraq
