= Political Prisoners Foundation (Iraq) =

Institute of Political Prisoners
- The Political Prisoners Foundation مؤسسة السجناء السياسيين

Government agency overview
- Formed: January 1, 2005; 21 years ago
- Headquarters: Baghdad, Iraq
- Employees: More than 500
- Website: www.ppf.gov.iq

The Political Prisoners Foundation (Arabic: مؤسسة السجناء السياسيين) is a governmental institution of the Iraqi Council of Ministers, established in 2005 to deal with the general situation of political prisoners and detainees before 2003 and to compensate them financially and morally, currently headed by Hussein Ali Khalil Al-Sultani.

== See also ==
- Politics of Iraq
