= Judiciary of Iraq =

The judiciary of Iraq is composed of apex courts, provincial-level lower courts, the public prosecutor as well as supervisory, advisory and cooperation authorities. The affairs of the judiciary are administered by the Supreme Judicial Council, and the Judicial Institute is responsible for training Iraqi judges.

The judiciary of Iraq was altered after the 2003 invasion and subsequent federalization of the country. However, since 2017, a trend of systematic reversal of post-2003 federalization has been occurring in favour of centralization.

The current head of the judiciary is Faiq Zaidan.

== Supreme Judicial Council ==
The Supreme Judicial Council manages and supervises the affairs of the federal judiciary. It oversees the affairs of the various judicial committees, nominates the Chief Justice and members of the Court of Cassation, the Chief Public Prosecutor, and the Chief Justice of the Judiciary Oversight Commission, as well as lower courts and drafts the budget of the judiciary. In 2013, the Council of Representatives passed the Iraqi Federal Supreme Court Act, which forbids the Chief Justice of the Supreme Court from also being the head of the Supreme Judicial Council, and replaced him with the Chief Justice of the Court of Cassation.

== Apex Courts ==
=== Court of Cassation ===
According to the Judicial Authority Law of 1963, the Court of Cassation is the apex court of Iraq within the remit of ordinary law; it is the supreme court for all civil courts. It is headquartered in Baghdad and consists of a chief justice, a sufficient number of deputy chief justices, permanent judges (not less than fifteen permanent judges) as well as delegated judges or rapporteur judges as needed.

=== Supreme (Constitutional) Court ===
The Supreme Court is an independent judicial body that has the exclusive authority to interpret the constitution and determines the constitutionality of laws and regulations. By effect, it is Iraq’s constitutional court; the apex court in the remit of constitutional law, and its verdicts within this remit are binding and not subject to appeal. Furthermore, it settles disputes amongst or between the federal government and the regions and governorates, municipalities, and local administrations, and settles accusations directed against the President, the Prime Minister and the Ministers. It also ratifies the final results of the general elections for the Council of Representatives. In November 2022, the president of the Supreme Judicial Council, Chief Justice Faiq Zaidan described the name "Federal Supreme Court" as a misnomer, and suggested that the name be changed to "Constitutional Court" befitting its authorities.

== Lower Courts ==
=== Courts of Appeal ===
The courts of appeal are the highest judicial authority at the provincial level, there is at least one in each governorate. They handle criminal appeals. The heads of the courts of appeal are appointed by the SJC based on career progression and years of service.

=== Central Criminal Court ===
The Central Criminal Court is the main criminal court of Iraq, based on an inquisitorial system and consists of two chambers: an investigative court, and a criminal court. It is based in Baghdad.

=== Criminal Courts ===
The criminal courts investigate crimes with penalties over five years' imprisonment, and their decisions are subject to review by the Court of Cassation. There is at least one in each governorate.

=== Misdemeanor Courts ===
The misdemeanor courts handle crimes that carry penalties between 3 months to 5 years' imprisonment and their decisions are subject to appeal at the local court of appeal. There are several of these in each governorate.

=== Courts of Inquiry ===
The courts of inquiry, also known as investigative courts, are tasked with handling all felonies that carry a penalty of more than five years’ imprisonment, as well as misdemeanors that carry a maximum penalty of five years’ imprisonment, including less serious offences carrying a penalty of 24 hours’ to three months’ incarceration. These courts usually handle cases submitted by the police. They consist of one judge with a member of the Public Prosecution Service. There are multiple courts of this type in each governorate.

== Judicial Oversight Commission ==
The commission monitors judicial conduct of courts and investigates cases of corruption involving judges and the employees of Iraqi courts. Its current head is Laith Jaber Hamzah.

== Public Prosecution Department ==
The department monitors decisions issued by judges and represents public interests. The current Chief Public Prosecutor is Adil Khudayr Abbas.

== Council of State ==
The Council of State's role is to provide legal advice to the legislative and executive authorities. The current head is Karim Khamis Khasabak. It became independent from the Ministry of Justice in 2017.

== NCIJC ==
The National Center for International Judicial Cooperation (NCIJC) established in 2024 is Iraq's central authority for international judicial matters. NCIJC exchanges information and evidence in cases of international crimes, financing of terrorism and cases involving serious violations of human rights. It also provides useful information to international partners such as EUROJUST in order to prevent terrorist attacks and locate suspects. It is headed by Judge Ali al-Tameemi.

On 12 May 2026, NCIJC reported that through a coordinated effort with German authorities, a planned terrorist attack against "civilian gatherings" in Hamburg was successfully thwarted after NCIJC provided the Germans with crucial information on the suspects and their planned attack.

== Institutes ==
=== Judicial Institute ===
The Judicial Institute, based in Baghdad, is responsible for the training of Iraq's judges and higher diploma certification in judicial sciences. Its current dean is Fatin Muhsin Hadi. Until 2017, the Judicial Institute was under the jurisdiction of the Ministry of Justice.

=== Judicial Development Institute ===
The Judicial Development Institute provides training and advice through workshops and programs designed to develop the professional profile of judges. The current director is Hassan Ali Abdul-Hadi.

== Special Courts ==
=== Supreme Iraqi Criminal Tribunal ===
The Supreme Iraqi Criminal Tribunal (formerly the Iraqi Special Tribunal) is a body established to try Iraqi nationals or residents accused of genocide, crimes against humanity, war crimes or other serious crimes committed between 1968 and 2003. It organized the trials of Saddam Hussein, Ali Hassan al-Majid ("Chemical Ali"), former Vice President Taha Yassin Ramadan, former deputy Prime Minister Tariq Aziz and other former senior officials of the deposed Ba'athist regime. The Court was set up by the Coalition Provisional Authority and reaffirmed later by the Iraqi Interim Government. In 2005 it was renamed after the constitution banned "special or exceptional courts".
