= Federalism in Iraq =

The 2005 Constitution of Iraq defined Iraq as a federal country for the first time.

== History ==
After the defeat of the Ottoman Empire in 1919, Iraq became a League of Nations mandate under temporary British control. Mahmud Barzanji led a Kurdish revolt against the British and in 1922 attempted to establish a state in northern Iraq. In 1924 the British defeated Mahmud, and the Mosul region was incorporated into the Kingdom of Iraq. After the British occupation, Kurdish leaders continued to press for autonomy within Iraq. In 1970 the Iraqi government agreed to create the Kurdistan Region covering three provinces of northern Iraq.

After the end of the Gulf War in 1991 the Kurdish region rose up against President Saddam Hussein and gained de facto independence under the protection of a no fly zone. After the US-led invasion of Iraq in 2003, the short-lived Transitional Administrative Law recognised the existing Kurdish regional government and defined Iraq for the first time as a federal country.

== Article 118 ==
Article 118 of the constitution of Iraq provided that no new region may be created before the Iraqi National Assembly has passed a law that provides the procedures for forming the region. This law was passed in October 2006 after an agreement was reached with the Iraqi Accord Front to form the constitutional review committee and to defer implementation of the law for 18 months. Legislators from the Iraqi Accord Front, Sadrist Movement and Islamic Virtue Party all opposed the bill.

== Sources ==
- Iraqi Constitution (PDF) (Constitution). 2005. Archived from the original (PDF) on 28 November 2016.
