= Official Gazette of Iraq =

The Official Gazette of Iraq (Arabic: الوقائع العراقية / ALA-LC: al-Waqā’i‘ al-‘Irāqiyah) has been the official source for the laws and resolutions passed by the Council of Representatives of Iraq since August 1922. Article 125 of the Constitution mandates that laws shall be published in the gazette and shall take effect on the date of their publication, unless stipulated otherwise. It is published by the Ministry of Justice.

In September 2008, the Iraqi Legal Database was launched by the United Nations Development Programme (UNDP) through its Programme on Governance in the Arab Region (POGAR).
