= Faiq Zaidan =

Head of Iraq's judiciary

- فائق زيدان

President of the Supreme Judicial Council of Iraq
- Incumbent
- Assumed office 23 January 2017
- Preceded by: Hassan Ibrahim Humairi

Chief Justice of the Court of Cassation of Iraq
- Incumbent
- Assumed office 6 February 2016
- Preceded by: Medhat al-Mahmoud

Personal details
- Born: Faiq Zaidan Khalaf Sheikh Farhan al-Aboudi; 1967 (age 58–59) Baghdad, Iraq
- Education: University of Baghdad (LL.B.); Judicial Institute, Baghdad (Higher Diploma); Islamic University of Lebanon (LL.M., PhD)
- Occupation: Lawyer, judge, professor

Faiq Zaidan al-Aboudi (Arabic: فائق زيدان العبودي; born 1967) is an Iraqi judge who has been chief justice of the Federal Court of Cassation since 2016. He assumed the position of president of the Supreme Judicial Council in 2017. During his tenure, he has established strong bilateral relations with the judiciaries of the United Kingdom, the UAE, France, Spain and others.

== Early life and education ==
Faiq Zaidan Khalaf Sheikh Farhan al-Aboudi was born in 1967, in Baghdad, originally from Al-Shatrah District in Dhi Qar Governorate in southern Iraq.

Zaidan graduated with a bachelor's degree in Law from the University of Baghdad in 1991, then worked as a lawyer for six years. Following two years of studying judicial sciences, at the Judicial Institute in Baghdad, Zaidan graduated with a higher diploma and became a judge in 1999. He started his career as a judge at the civil and criminal courts in Baghdad.

In 2017, he graduated with a master's degree in international law from the Islamic University of Lebanon and in 2020, he graduated with a PhD in public law from the same university.

== Career ==
Following the invasion of Iraq and the fall of the Ba'athist regime, Zaidan was among the first judges to be appointed in senior positions in the new Iraqi state. In 2005, he was named the president of the Iraqi Central Investigation Court Specialising in Combating Terrorism and Major Crimes. Then in 2012, he became a member of the Iraqi Court of Cassation (the apex court), then its vice-president in 2014 and finally its president in 2016.

On 23 January 2017, the Iraqi Council of Representatives passed the Supreme Judicial Council Law No. 45 which stipulated that the president of the Court of Cassation shall assume the position of president of the Supreme Judicial Council ex officio. Zaidan then subsequently became the head of Iraq's Supreme Judicial Council, which is the foremost judicial body in the country, responsible for managing all affairs of the judiciary.

In January 2021, Zaidan issued an arrest warrant for the United States president Donald Trump, charging him with orchestrating the assassination of Iranian General Qasem Soleimani and Iraqi militia leader Abu Mahdi al-Muhandis. He described it as "a treacherous and cowardly crime that has no moral basis". The warrant, issued under Article 406 of Iraq's Penal Code, accuses Trump of premeditated murder, a crime punishable by death. The arrest warrant was later withdrawn.

In November 2021, Faiq Zaidan reportedly directly intervened in a marriage contract involving a 12-year old girl from Baghdad, by revoking it. On 10 November 2021, the American University of Iraq - Baghdad (AUIB) appointed Zaidan as Distinguished Professor of Law, honoris causa, at the AUIB College of Law.

In 2022, Faiq Zaidan was accused by some American commentators of politicizing Iraq's judiciary, and influencing verdicts to align with the interests of the ruling Coordination Framework, which is mostly composed of pro-Iran parties. According to Alhurra, Michael Knights from the pro-Israeli Washington Institute for Near East Policy alleged that Zaidan guided a 2022 Federal Supreme Court ruling that altered the requirement for electing Iraq's president from a two-thirds majority vote to a two-thirds quorum, thereby empowering pro-Iranian forces. Furthermore, Michael Knights also claimed to have knowledge about an alleged secret meeting between former Prime Minister Nouri Al-Maliki, Iranian Quds Force commander Esmail Qaani (who was later reportedly accused of being an Israeli spy) and Zaidan to secure the ruling, effectively undermining the election results. Thus, the Coordination Framework successfully thwarted Muqtada al-Sadr's efforts to form a 165-seat majority government with the participation of Sunni Arab and Kurdish factions.

In April 2023, Zaidan visited the French National Assembly and met with its deputy president Valérie Rossi as well as the French minister of justice Éric Dupond-Moretti and discussed ways of cooperation between the two countries.

In August 2023, Zaidan met with United States ambassador to Iraq Alina Romanowski and discussed legal issues of common interests. This was followed by another meeting in November 2023, where they discussed joint efforts to achieve security stability in Iraq and the role of the judiciary in imposing the rule of law.

On 27 June 2024, U.S. Representative Mike Waltz claimed on the social media platform X (formerly Twitter) that "Faiq Zaidan is a tool of Iranian influence", describing him as being "at the center of Iran's plot to turn Iraq into a client state". The Iraqi Ministry of Foreign Affairs categorically rejected and condemned the comment made by Waltz describing it as a "blatant interference in Iraqi internal affairs", and the US ambassador Romanowski met with Zaidan shortly after on 2 July 2024, to reiterate US support for the Iraqi judiciary, stating: "Today, I met with SJC President Judge Faiq Zaidan as part of our good and growing relationship with the Iraqi Judiciary to continue our work on important legal matters of mutual interest." Mike Waltz (a member of the Kurdish American Caucus) was reportedly among those American politicians allegedly lobbied by KDP against certain influential Iraqi figures, foremost of them Zaidan due to his central and decisive role in the Iraqi judiciary — one that the KDP has extensively criticised due to its role in curbing Kurdistan Region's authorities and curtailing its autonomy by creating the legal ground for Baghdad to consolidate power, effectively facilitating the return of centralism and the demise of federalism adopted in 2005. Hemin Hawrami, senior KDP member and previous head of KDP foreign relations, writing for the Paris-based European Institute for Studies on the Middle East and North Africa, concluded his lambasting of the Iraqi judiciary by reiterating what the KDP political politburo stated on 18 March 2024, namely: “[T]o prevent [the Iraqi] politicized judicial institution… is also an international, and particularly an American responsibility”, claiming that it is incumbent upon the United States to intervene on behalf of the Kurds.

On 9 May 2025, Zaidan visited Madrid, Spain, and met with Isabel Perelló, the Spanish president of the Supreme Court and the General Council of the Judiciary and Álvaro García Ortiz, the attorney general of the Prosecution Ministry as well as the president of Audiencia Nacional. The meeting included discussing ways to strengthen the bilateral relationship between the two judiciaries especially in joint work, judicial cooperation and exchange of experiences in legal matters.

On 25 June 2025, Zaidan visited the United Kingdom and met with the Foreign, Commonwealth and Development Office's under-secretary of state Hamish Falconer, with whom Zaidan signed a memorandum of understanding for judicial cooperation in combating terrorism. Zaidan also visited the House of Lords and met with its legal experts, as well as baroness Emma Nicholson who gave him a tour of the House and briefed him on the nature of its work. They also discussed Iraq's judicial system. Zaidan also met with former UK ambassador to Iraq, Stephen Hickey and Iraq's current ambassador to UK, Mohammad Jafar al-Sadr. On 26 June, Zaidan visited the Royal Institute of International Affairs (Chatham House) where he met with a number of researchers and legal specialists. Zaidan headed a discussion session that addressed the nature of the work of the Iraqi judiciary and a number of other legal issues of international interest.

On 23 July 2025, Zaidan issued an official statement in support of a law passed by the Iraqi Council of Representatives in 2013 concerning a 2012 bilateral treaty signed between Iraq and Kuwait regarding maritime navigation in the Khawr Abd Allah estuary along the current borders of the two countries, as well as joint management of environmental matters, (per Pacta sunt servanda), after the Federal Supreme Court of Iraq ruled the treaty's enactment as unconstitutional. The treaty's controversial nature stems from issues related to incomplete Iraqi–Kuwaiti maritime border demarcation and possible implications related to Iraq's rights to natural resources in the Arabian Gulf; namely, the Durra gas field that Kuwait, Saudi Arabia and Iran lay claim to.

In December 2025, after several armed groups announced their willingness to disarm, Zaidan thanked Popular Mobilisation Forces faction leaders for heeding his advice to "coordinate together to enforcing the rule of law, restrict weapons to state control, and transition to political action after the national need for military action has ceased", in a separate announcement, the Supreme Judicial Council stated that the chief justice's intervention was to remind political actors to uphold Article 9 of the Iraqi constitution, which "prohibits the formation of armed militias outside the framework of the state".

On 15 October 2026, Zaidan stated that there were issues regarding the implementation of certain provisions of the constitution, which expose the necessity for amendments. He gave the examples of parliamentary majority, the election of the president of the republic, and the designation of the 'largest bloc' in parliament.

On 10 November 2026, Zaidan visited the United Kingdom to take part in the Iraq Initiative conference held by Chatham House as well as hold meetings with a number of senior politicians, such as former UK prime minister Tony Blair and the ambassador of the United States to Turkey, Tom Barrack. During his meeting with Barrack, they discussed important issues related to Iraq's political situation and ways to resolve them. Zaidan stated that Iraq's political problems which he said arise from the application of the current constitution, cannot be resolved without amending the constitution. Zaidan also said that the failure of Iraq's parliamentary system, not the political system itself, is a result of "the Iraqi people's dissatisfaction with the results achieved in Iraq since 2003", and that the solution is to return to the pre-2003 presidential system.

== Thwarted assassination plot ==
On 17 August 2026, the Iraqi National Security Service (INSS) thwarted a plan to assassinate Zaidan. The terror cell planned to launch weaponised drones against his motorcade or residence. Iraqi security forces confiscated explosive materials as well as remote-control and surveillance equipment during raids conducted across several Iraqi provinces. 15 individuals linked to the plot were arrested, while the sophistication of the confiscated materials indicated "external logistical support". As the head of the Iraqi judiciary, Zaidan has played the central role in the prosecution of individuals related to corruption and financing of terrorism. He has also been an advocate for arms control (supporting the Iraqi government in disarming militias) to the detriment of pro-Iran militias.

== Personal life ==
In an interview conducted by Al Sharqiya in April 2021, Zaidan was asked about his relationship with the former Chief of Staff of the Iranian-backed paramilitary group PMF - Abu Mahdi al-Muhandis, who was assassinated alongside Qassem Soleimani by a targeted U.S. drone strike in January 2020. Zaidan answered: "Abu Mahdi is my brother whom my mother did not give birth to. We used to share a strong relationship of friendship and brotherhood, only. In terms of any other claims made in the media [such as Zaidan's daughter being married to Abu Mahdi's son], never."
