= Constitution of Iraq =

National constitution

Iraqi Constitution

Overview
- Jurisdiction: Iraq
- Created: Summer 2005
- Presented: 18 September 2005
- Ratified: 15 October 2005
- Date effective: 28 December 2005
- System: Federal parliamentary republic

Government structure
- Branches: Three (Executive, Legislative and Judiciary)
- Head of state: President of Iraq
- Chambers: Council of Representatives of Iraq; Federation Council of Iraq
- Executive: Prime Minister of Iraq and Council of Ministers
- Judiciary: Supreme Judicial Council of Iraq; Court of Cassation; Supreme Court of Iraq; Public Prosecution Department; Judiciary Oversight Commission; Central Criminal Court of Iraq
- Federalism: Yes
- Electoral college: Independent High Electoral Commission

The Constitution of the Republic of Iraq (Arabic: دستور جمهورية العراق Kurdish: دەستووری عێراق) is the fundamental law of Iraq. The first constitution came into force in 1925. The current constitution was adopted on 18 September 2005 by the Transitional National Assembly of Iraq, and confirmed by constitutional referendum, held on 15 October 2005. It was published on 28 December 2005 in the Official Gazette of Iraq (No. 4012), in Arabic original, and thus came into force. An official translation into English for international use was produced in cooperation between Iraqi state authorities and the United Nations' Office for Constitutional Support. Since 2006, several proposals for adoption of various constitutional amendments were initiated. The Kurdish language is official at state level.

== History ==
Iraq's first constitution, which established a constitutional monarchy, entered into force under the auspices of a British military occupation in 1925 and remained in effect until the 1958 revolution established a republic. Interim constitutions were adopted in 1958, 1964, 1968, and 1970, the last remaining in effect de jure until the Transitional Administrative Law was adopted in 2003 after the fall of Saddam Hussein. In 1990, a draft constitution was prepared but never promulgated due to the onset of the Gulf War.

The current constitution was approved by a referendum that took place on 15 October 2005. The constitution was drafted in 2005 by members of the Iraqi Constitution Drafting Committee to replace the Law of Administration for the State of Iraq for the Transitional Period (the "TAL"). The TAL was drafted between December 2003 and March 2004 by the Iraqi Governing Council, an appointed body that was selected by the Coalition Provisional Authority after the Iraq War and Occupation of Iraq by the United States and Coalition forces.

Under a compromise brokered before the referendum, it was agreed that the first parliament elected pursuant to the new constitution would institute a Constitutional Review Committee with a view to determine whether the constitution should be amended. Any amendments agreed would have to be ratified by a referendum similar to the one that originally approved it. After this agreement was entered into, the Sunni-majority Iraqi Islamic Party agreed to back a Yes vote in the referendum that took place on 15 October 2005. The Constitutional Review Committee was constituted by the Iraqi parliament on 25 September 2006.

Electoral Commission officials said at a news conference that 78 percent of voters backed the charter and 21 percent opposed it. Of the 18 provinces, two recorded "No" votes greater than two thirds, one province short of a veto. A two-thirds rejection vote in three of the country's 18 provinces (of which three—Mosul, Anbar, and Salahaddin—are thought to include Sunni majorities) would have required the dissolution of the Assembly, fresh elections, and the recommencement of the entire drafting process. Turnout in the referendum was 63 percent, according to commission officials.

The drafting and adoption of the new Constitution was not without controversy, however, as sectarian tensions in Iraq figured heavily in the process. The chairman of the drafting committee, Humam Hamoudi, regularly made statements which were interpreted as meaning that there would be no compromises on Sunni demands. The deadline for the conclusion of drafting was extended on four occasions because of the lack of consensus on religious language. In the end, only three of the 15 Sunni members of the drafting committee attended the signing ceremony, and none of them signed it. Sunni leaders were split as to whether to support the constitution. Saleh al-Mutlaq, the chief Sunni negotiator, urged followers of his Hewar Front to vote against it, but the biggest Sunni block, the Iraqi Accord Front did support the document after receiving promises that it would be reviewed and amended, taking into account their views. A Constitution Amendment Committee has been set up in this regard, but the progress has been slow. Notably, the same figure who chaired the drafting committee, Humam Hamoudi, is chairing the amendment committee as well.

=== Drafting and adoption ===
The Transitional National Assembly of Iraq, which was elected in January 2005 pursuant to the Coalition Provisional Authority's Transitional Administrative Law, appointed a Constitutional Committee for the purpose of preparing a draft constitution by 15 August 2005. The Committee was initially made up of 55 members, all of whom were drawn from the Transitional National Assembly, but its membership was eventually expanded beyond the Assembly's numbers, in order to allow representatives from the Sunni Arab community to participate (given that the latter had boycotted the elections that gave rise to the Transitional National Assembly).

According to the Transitional Administrative Law, the Constitutional Committee was obliged to complete its work by 15 August 2005, and for the draft to be submitted to a referendum by 15 October 2005. However, by the beginning of August 2005, all parties were in agreement that a final agreement on some of the Constitution's most important elements, including federalism, was still far from complete. As a result, the Committee was effectively dissolved and replaced by an ad hoc body (referred to as the "Leadership Council"), which was composed of approximately 6 members and which continued to negotiate the constitution's final terms until three days before the referendum date.

The first draft of the proposed constitution was presented to the Transitional National Assembly on Sunday 28 August 2005. It described the state as a "democratic, federal, representative republic" (art. 1) (however, the division of powers is to be deferred until the first parliament convenes), and a "multi-ethnic, multi-religious and multi-sect country" (art. 3). The draft was approved, but political negotiations continued, in order to reach a compromise that would also ensure the support of Sunni groups, thus leading to consequent revisions and redrafting of several articles.

On 18 September 2005, the Transitional National Assembly of Iraq approved and adopted the final constitutional draft, that was then put to the public. The Constitution was finally adopted on 15 October 2005, in a national referendum. The Constitution was published on 28 December 2005, in the Official Gazette of Iraq (No. 4012), in Arabic original, and thus came into force.

Since there were several unofficial translations of previous drafts and proposals, that were created earlier, during the summer of 2005, an official translation of the Constitution, for international use (in English language) was produced, in cooperation between state authorities Iraq and the United Nations' Office for Constitutional Support.

=== Proposed changes ===
Under a compromise brokered before the referendum, it was agreed that the first parliament that was to be elected pursuant to the new constitution would institute a Constitutional Review Committee with a view to determine whether the constitution should be amended. Any amendments agreed would have to be ratified by a similar referendum to the one that originally approved it. After this agreement was entered into, the Sunni-majority Iraqi Islamic Party agreed to back a Yes vote in the referendum that took place on 15 October 2005. The Constitutional Review Committee was constituted by the Iraqi parliament on 25 September 2006.

== Overview ==
=== Basic principles ===
The Constitution sets out a multitude of basic assertions (unfortunately because of last minute changes to the constitution, most of the footnote references below to specific articles in the constitution are inaccurate):

- The Republic of Iraq is a single, independent and fully sovereign state.
- The system of government is a democratic, federal, representative, parliamentary republic.
- Islam is the state religion and a basic foundation for the country's laws, and no law may contradict the established provisions of Islam.
- No law that contradicts the principles of democracy may be established.
- No law that contradicts the rights and basic freedoms may be established.
- The Islamic identity of the majority of the Iraqi people and the full religious rights for all individuals and the freedom of creed and religious practices is guaranteed.
- Iraq is part of the Islamic world and is a founding and active member of the Arab League and is committed to its charter.
- Iraq is a multiethnic, multi-religious and multi-sect country and Arabic and Kurdish are the official languages. Iraqis are guaranteed the right to educate their children in their mother tongues, such as Turkmen, Chaldean, and Assyrian, in government educational institutions, or any other language in private educational institutions, according to educational regulations.
- The Turkomen, Chaldean, and Assyrian languages will be official in the areas where they are located. Any region or province can take a local language as an additional official language if a majority of the population approves in a general referendum.
- Entities or trends may not advocate, instigate, justify or propagate racism, terrorism, "takfir" (declaring someone an infidel), or sectarian cleansing. The "Saddamist Ba'ath Party", regardless of the name that it adopts, is specifically banned.
- The country has a military and security services under the command of the civil authority, and will not interfere in politics, or be used in the transfer of authority. Militias are prohibited. Military officials may not hold office.
- The constitution is the highest law of the land. No law may be passed that contradicts the constitution.

=== Rights and freedoms ===
The Constitution defines many rights and freedoms, and incorporates laws in many subject areas into the Constitution. It guarantees the rule of law, equality before the law, equal opportunity, privacy, inalienable nationality and dual nationality, judicial independence, the prohibition on criminal ex post facto laws, right to counsel, a public trial unless the court decides to make it a secret trial, a presumption of innocence, the right to participate in public affairs and the right to vote, to elect and to nominate, freedom from extradition, political asylum, "economic, social and cultural liberties", the right to work, the right to join trade unions, ownership of personal property, eminent domain powers, rights similar to the Four Freedoms (European Union), minimum wage, universal health care, free education, dignity, freedom from psychological and physical torture and inhumane treatment and the right to compensation, freedom from "compulsory service", limited freedom of expression, freedom of the press, and freedom of assembly, the right to engage in sports, limited freedom of forming and of joining associations and political parties, requirement of warrants for wiretaps, freedom of religion, freedom of thought, conscience and belief.

=== The Federal Government ===
The federal government is composed of the executive, legislative, and judicial branches, as well as numerous independent commissions.

==== Legislative branch ====
The legislative branch is composed of the Council of Representatives and the Federation Council.

===== Council of Representatives =====
The Council of Representatives is the main elected body of Iraq. The Constitution defines the "number of members at a ratio of one representative per 100,000 Iraqi persons representing the entire Iraqi people." The members are elected for terms of 4 years.

The council elects the President of Iraq; approves the appointment of the members of the Federal Court of Cassation, the Chief Public Prosecutor, and the President of Judicial Oversight Commission on proposal by the Higher Juridical Council; and approves the appointment of the Army Chief of Staff, his assistants and those of the rank of division commanders and above, and the director of the intelligence service, on proposal by the Cabinet.

===== Federation Council =====
The Federation Council is composed of representatives from the regions and the governorates that are not organized in a region. The council is regulated in law by the Council of Representatives.

==== Executive branch ====
The executive branch is composed of the President and the Council of Ministers.

===== President =====
The President of the Republic is the head of state and "safeguards the commitment to the Constitution and the preservation of Iraq's independence, sovereignty, unity, the security of its territories in accordance with the provisions of the Constitution." The President is elected by the Council of Representatives by a two-thirds majority, and is limited to two four-year terms. The President ratifies treaties and laws passed by the Council of Representatives, issues pardons on the recommendation of the Prime Minister, and performs the "duty of the High Command of the armed forces for ceremonial and honorary purposes."

There also exists a Vice President which shall assume the office of the President in case of his absence or removal.

The Presidency Council is an entity currently operating under the auspices of the "transitional provisions" of the Constitution. According to the Constitution, the Presidency Council functions in the role of the President until one successive term after the Constitution is ratified and a government is seated.

===== Council of Ministers =====
The Council of Ministers is composed of the Prime Minister and his cabinet. The President of Iraq names the nominee of the Council of Representatives bloc with the largest number to form the Cabinet. The Prime Minister is the direct executive authority responsible for the general policy of the State and the commander-in-chief of the armed forces, directs the Council of Ministers, and presides over its meetings and has the right to dismiss the Ministers on the consent of the Council of Representatives.

The cabinet is responsible for overseeing their respective ministries, proposing laws, preparing the budget, negotiating and signing international agreements and treaties, and appointing undersecretaries, ambassadors, the Chief of Staff of the Armed Forces and his assistants, Division Commanders or higher, the Director of the National Intelligence Service, and heads of security institutions.

==== Judicial branch ====
The federal judiciary is composed of the Supreme Judicial Council, the Court of Cassation, Supreme Court, the Public Prosecution Department, the Judiciary Oversight Commission, and other federal courts that are regulated by law. One such court is the Central Criminal Court.

===== Supreme Judicial Council =====
The Supreme Judicial Council manages and supervises the affairs of the federal judiciary. It oversees the affairs of the various judicial committees, nominates the Chief Justice and members of the Court of Cassation, the Chief Public Prosecutor, and the Chief Justice of the Judiciary Oversight Commission, and drafts the budget of the judiciary.

===== Court of Cassation =====
According to the Judicial Authority Law of 1963, the Court of Cassation is the apex court of the judiciary. The Court of Cassation is the supreme judicial body for all civil courts. It is headquartered in Baghdad and consists of a president, a sufficient number of vice-presidents, permanent judges, not less than fifteen permanent judges, delegated judges or rapporteur judges as needed.

===== Supreme Court =====
The Federal Supreme Court is an independent judicial body that interprets the constitution and determines the constitutionality of laws and regulations. It settles disputes amongst or between the federal government and the regions and governorates, municipalities, and local administrations, and settles accusations directed against the President, the Prime Minister and the Ministers. It also ratifies the final results of the general elections for the Council of Representatives. In November 2022, the president of the Supreme Judicial Council, Chief Justice Dr. Faiq Zaidan described the name "Federal Supreme Court" as a misnomer, and suggested that the name be changed to "Constitutional Court" befitting its authorities.

===== Central Criminal Court =====
The Central Criminal Court of Iraq is the main criminal court of Iraq. The CCCI is based on an inquisitorial system and consists of two chambers: an investigative court, and a criminal court.

==== Independent commissions and institutions ====
The Independent High Commission for Human Rights, the Independent High Electoral Commission, and the Commission on Public Integrity are independent commissions subject to monitoring by the Council of Representatives. The Central Bank of Iraq, the Board of Supreme Audit, the Communications and Media Commission, and the Shiite Endowment Office and Sunni Endowment Office are financially and administratively independent institutions. The Foundation of Martyrs is attached to the Council of Ministers. The Federal Public Service Council regulates the affairs of the federal public service, including appointment and promotion.

=== Powers of the Federal Government ===
The federal government has exclusive power over:

- Foreign policy and negotiation
- Fiscal and customs policy, currency, inter-regional and inter-governorate trade policy, monetary policy, and administering a central bank
- Standards and weights, naturalization, the radio spectrum, and the mail
- The national budget
- Water policies
- The Census
- Welfare programs
- Management of oil and gas, in cooperation with the governments of the producing regions and governorates

Powers shared with regional authorities:

- regional customs
- electrical power
- environmental policy
- public planning
- health, and education

All powers not exclusively granted to the federal government are powers of the regions and governorates that are not organized in a region. Priority is given to regional law in case of conflict between other powers shared between the federal government and regional governments.

=== Regions ===
Chapter Five, Authorities of the Regions, describes the form of Iraq's federation. It begins by stating that the republic's federal system is made up of the capital, regions, decentralized provinces, and local administrations.

- Part One: Regions

The country's future Regions are to be established from its current 18 governorates (or provinces). Any single province, or group of provinces, is entitled to request that it be recognized as a region, with such a request being made by either two-thirds of the members of the provincial councils in the provinces involved or by one-tenth of the registered voters in the province(s) in question.

- Part Two: Provinces not organized into a Region

Provinces that are unwilling or unable to join a region still enjoy enough autonomy and resources to enable them to manage their own internal affairs according to the principle of administrative decentralization. With the two parties' approval, federal government responsibilities may be delegated to the provinces, or vice versa. These decentralized provinces are headed by Provincial Governors, elected by Provincial Councils. The administrative levels within a province are defined, in descending order, as districts, counties and villages.

- Part Three: The Capital

Article 120 states that Baghdad is the Capital of the Republic, within the boundaries of Baghdad Governorate. The constitution makes no specific reference to the status of the capital and its surrounding governorate within the federal structure, stating merely that its status is to be regulated by law.

- Part Four: Local Administrations

Consisting solely of Article 121, Part Four simply states that the constitution guarantees the administrative, political, cultural, and educational rights of the country's various ethnic groups (Turkmens, Assyrians, etc.), and that legislation will be adopted to regulate those rights.

== See also ==
- Iraqi Local Governance Law Library
- Coalition Provisional Authority
