= 2005 Iraqi constitutional referendum =

- 15 October 2005

Results
Choice	Votes	%
Yes	7,742,796	78.59%
No	2,109,495	21.41%
Valid votes	9,852,291	97.99%
Invalid or blank votes	201,809	2.01%
Total votes	10,054,100	100.00%
Registered voters/turnout	15,568,702	64.58%
- Results by governorate Yes: 50-60% 60-70% 70-80% 90-100% No: 50-60% 80-90% 90-100%

The electorate of Iraq went to the polls on 15 October 2005 to vote in a referendum on whether or not to ratify the proposed constitution of Iraq. After 10 days of counting votes, the country's electoral commission announced that the constitution had been approved by a wide margin nationwide. A number of mainly Sunni critics like future deputy prime minister Saleh al-Mutlaq alleged massive irregularities, saying that soldiers broke in to polling stations and changed votes to yes in the crucial province of Nineveh, which was expected by them to provide the third (and deciding) "no" vote.

== Background and campaign ==
Article 61 of Iraq's Interim Constitution, in effect since 28 June 2004, laid down the rules for the approval of the proposed permanent constitution. The proposed constitution would have been approved in the referendum if both a majority of voters nationwide voted "yes" and there were no more than 2 of the country's 18 governorates where two-thirds of the voters voted "no." On 2 October 2005, the National Assembly weakened the second requirement such that it would only fail to be fulfilled if two-thirds of registered voters—rather than actual voters—in three governorates voted "no." Opponents of the Draft Constitution reacted angrily to this reinterpretation of Article 61 of the Interim Constitution. Critics had also pointed out that such an interpretation reads the term "voter" differently in both requirements; the first requirement is still simply fulfilled if a majority of actual voters nationwide votes yes. After much international criticism, the decision was reversed on 5 October.

The possibility of veto by supermajorities of three or more governorates was originally written into the interim constitution to ensure that the permanent constitution would be acceptable to Iraq's Kurdish minority. However, support for the constitution was weakest among Iraq's Sunni Arab community, and some observers thought that the Sunni vote would result in the constitution's rejection. While the exact ethnic distribution of the Iraqi population by governorate is unknown, because the country had not had an official census for 15 years, governorates that include substantial Sunni populations include Baghdad, Al Anbar, Salah ad Din, Nineveh and Diyala. In the event, Al Anbar, Saladin, and Nineveh all saw majorities vote against ratification, though the vote in Nineveh did not result in the two-thirds "no" supermajority required to scuttle the constitution.

== Conduct ==
Voting took place as planned on 15 October. All civilian cars were banned from streets due to heavy security. Attacks against polling stations were reported in Bagdad, with low casualties. Initially, Iraqi election officials had hoped that results of the balloting would be made public by 19 October. On 17 October, however, election officials announced that questions concerning the turnout in some provinces required that the vote be audited, which delayed release of the final figures. A sandstorm in central Iraq has also contributed to the delay. Although Sunni politician Saleh al-Mutlaq has alleged fraud, election monitors from the United Nations said that the vote "went well."

During this election, security detainees held by coalition forces and the Ministry of Interior were given the opportunity to vote. This is the first time in the modern history of the Middle East that detainees of this nature were allowed to vote in any election.

== Results ==
On 25 October, Electoral Commission officials released the final results, which indicated that the constitution had been approved. Overall, 79% of voters backed the charter and 21% opposed it. Of 18 governorates, only two recorded "No" votes greater than two thirds—one province short of a veto.

Choice	Votes	%
For	7,742,796	78.59
Against	2,109,495	21.41
Total	9,852,291	100.00
Valid votes	9,852,291	98.00
Invalid/blank votes	201,089	2.00
Total votes	10,053,380	100.00
Registered voters/turnout	15,568,702	64.57
Source: IFES

=== By governorate ===
Governorate	Demographics	Votes	% For	% Against
1 Baghdad	Capital and surrounding area	2,120,615	77.7	22.3
2 Salah ad Din	Sunni Arab majority, claimed partly by, but not yet part of, Kurdistan Autonomous Region	510,152	18.25	81.75
3 Diyala	Sunni Arab majority, claimed partly by, but not yet part of, Kurdistan Autonomous Region	476,980	51.27	48.73
4 Wasit	Shi'a Arab majority	280,128	95.7	4.3
5 Maysan	Shi'a Arab majority	254,067	97.79	2.21
6 Al Basrah	Shi'a Arab majority	691,024	96.02	3.98
7 Dhi Qar	Shi'a Arab majority	462,710	97.15	2.85
8 Al Muthanna	Shi'a Arab majority	185,710	98.65	1.35
9 Al Qadisyah	Shi'a Arab majority	297,176	96.74	3.32
10 Babil	Shi'a Arab majority	543,779	94.56	5.44
11 Al Karbala	Shi'a Arab majority	264,674	96.58	3.42
12 An Najaf	Shi'a Arab majority	299,420	95.82	4.18
13 Al Anbar	Sunni Arab majority	259,919	3.04	96.96
14 Nineveh	Mostly Sunni Arabs, claimed partly by, but not yet part of, Kurdistan Autonomous Region	718,758	44.92	55.08
15 Dahuk	Part of Kurdistan Autonomous Region	389,198	99.13	0.87
16 Arbil	Part of Kurdistan Autonomous Region	830,570	99.36	0.64
17 At Ta'min (now Kirkuk)	Claimed by, but not yet part of, Kurdistan Autonomous Region	542,688	62.91	37.09
18 As Sulaymaniyah	Part of Kurdistan Autonomous Region	723,723	98.96	1.04
Total		9,852,291	78.59	21.41

== Aftermath ==
With the approval of the constitution, elections for a permanent government must be held no later than 15 December 2005, with the new government assuming office no later than 31 December 2005. If the constitution had been rejected, the National Assembly would have been dissolved, and a new transitional government would have been elected to attempt to write another permanent constitution.

== See also ==
- Federalism in Iraq
