= Federal Supreme Court of Iraq =

Constitutional court of Iraq

- Arabic: المحكمة الاتحادية العليا; Kurdish: دادگای باڵای ئيتيحادى
- Established: 2005
- Jurisdiction: Iraq
- Location: Green Zone, Baghdad
- Composition method: see Composition
- Authorised by: Constitution of Iraq, Executive Order No. 30 of 2005 as amended by Federal Supreme Court Law (No. 25 of 2021)
- Judge term length: Mandatory retirement at age 72
- Number of positions: 9
- Website: iraqfsc.iq

President
- Currently: Mundhir Ibrahim Hussein
- Since: 30 June 2025

The Federal Supreme Court of Iraq (Note: Arabic: المحكمة الاتحادية العليا, Al-Mahkamah al-Ittihādiyah al-‘Ulyā; Kurdish: دادگای باڵای ئيتيحادى) (FSC) is a financially and administratively independent judicial body and one of Iraq's two apex courts. As the final court of appeal having the exclusive jurisdiction to interpret the provisions of the Constitution of Iraq, it effectively functions as the constitutional court.

In addition to determining the constitutionality of laws and regulations, FSC reviews the application of federal laws, as well as settles disputes between the federal government, federal regions, governorates, municipalities, and local administrations. It also settles accusations directed against the President, the Prime Minister and the Ministers, and ratifies the final results of the general elections for the Council of Representatives. Since 2024, the court has expanded its authorities to include the power to amend regional legislation, such as those passed by the Kurdistan Region Parliament.

== Composition ==
The Federal Supreme Court Law No. 25 of 2021, gives the heads of the following: Supreme Judicial Council, Federal Supreme Court, Public Prosecutor’s Department, and Judicial Oversight Commission together the authority to select and designate its members. The law does not give the parliament veto power and includes a clause that permits bypassing the President of the Republic in case the presidential decree for the selected members is not issued regardless of the reason, granting the judiciary complete autonomy.

FSC is composed of a president, a deputy, and seven primary members. The law also stipulates that proportional representation of the main components of Iraqi society must be guaranteed in the court's composition. In practice, this has meant that it is composed of five Shi’i Arabs, two Sunni Arabs, and two Kurds.

As of April 2026, FSC is composed of the following members:

1. Judge Mundhir Ibrahim Hussein Abd Ali (Chief Justice)
2. Judge Samir Abbas Muhammad Antar (Deputy Chief Justice)
3. Judge Ghalib Aamir Shanin Madhlum
4. Judge Haydar Jabir Abd Jasim
5. Judge Haydar Ali Nouri Hassun
6. Judge Khalaf Ahmad Rajab Shaykh
7. Judge Ayyub Abbas Salih
8. Judge Abdur-Rahman Sulayman Ali
9. Judge Diyar Muhammad Ali Muhammad

In addition to the following reserve members:

1. Judge Adil Abdul-Razzaq Abbas Muhammad
2. Judge Khalid Taha Ahmad Dhahir

== History ==
In 2005, the prime minister of the Interim Iraqi Government, Ayad Allawi, issued an executive order titled Executive Order No. 30 of 2005, granting the FSC extensive powers to determine the constitutionality of legislative and regulatory acts, arbitrate disputes between Baghdad and the regions and governorates, validate parliamentary election results, and assert exclusive jurisdiction over prosecutions against top government authorities. The court was also given several guarantees of independence, including at the administrative and financial levels. Due to the fact that the Supreme Court at the time was established by an executive order before the adoption of the new Iraqi constitution and the subsequent formation of the Council of Representatives, a separate law passed by the Council (by supermajority) that formally defines the court's status was required to be passed, per Article 92 of the Constitution of Iraq. However, in June 2021, after a string of failed attempts to reach a compromise between Iraqi political parties representing different components of the society, the simple majority of the Council of Representatives passed a law (Federal Supreme Court Law No. 25 of 2021) that amended Executive Order No. 30. Instead of passing a new law stipulated by the constitution, which would've required a supermajority, a legal loophole was found in amending the previous law issued by interim prime minister Allawi, by simple majority.

== See also ==
- Supreme Judicial Council of Iraq
