= Supreme Judicial Council of Iraq =

Judicial authority

Supreme Judicial Council
- مجلس القضاء الاعلى
- Coat of arms of Iraq
- Formation: 2005; 21 years ago
- Headquarters: Green Zone, Baghdad, Iraq
- President: Faiq Zaidan
- Website: sjc.iq

The Supreme Judicial Council of Iraq (SJC; Arabic: مجلس القضاء الأعلى) is the highest judicial organisation of Iraq. It is currently composed of 23 high ranking judges of the foremost judicial bodies. It manages all affairs related to the judiciary of Iraq. It is headed by the chief justice of the Court of Cassation, Faiq Zaidan.

== Composition ==
As of April 2026, the Supreme Judicial Council is composed of:

=== President ===
Faiq Zaidan, the Chief Justice of the Court of Cassation (Note: The President of the Supreme Judicial Council ex officio)

=== Members ===
Deputy Chief Justices of the Court of Cassation

- Zaidun Sadun Bashar al-Saidi (1st)
- Najm Ahmad Abdullah Khidr al-Dulaymi (2nd)
- Kadhim Abbas Habib Ali al-Khafaji (3rd)
- Hassan Fuad Munim Raheem al-Khafaji (4th)

Chief Public Prosecutor

- Adil Khudayr Abbas

President of the Judicial Oversight Commission

- Laith Jabr Hamzah Salman Al Hamid

Presidents of the provincial Courts of Appeal

- Imad Khudhayr Muhammad al-Jabiri (Baghdad-Rusafah)
- Khalid Taha Ahmad Dhahir al-Mashhadani (Baghdad-Karkh)
- Adil Abdul-Razzaq Abbas al-Miyahi (Basrah)
- Raid Hameed Hussain Muslih al-Kartani (Nineveh)
- Hamid Mahdi Tomas (Babylon)
- Qassim Muhammad Sulaiman Matar al-Azzawi (Kirkuk)
- Ali Abdul-Ghani Jallab Yaqub al-Attabi (Dhi Qar)
- Hassan Sudi Hassan al-Ziyadi (Najaf)
- Ali Daih Jarayan (Anbar)
- Muhammad Handhal Aziz Barghash al-Dawari (Wasit)
- Walid Ahmad Kurdi al-Dulaymi (Salah al-Din)
- Hussain Kadhim Wasmi al-Zuhaidi (Diyala)
- Muhammad Haydar Hussain Dawud al-Lami (Missan)
- Radhi Abu Hasanah Hassan Atiyah al-Yaqubi (Muthanna)
- Ahmad Hadi Hussain al-Mansuri (Karbala)
- Talib Hassan Hasbi (Qadisiyyah)

Presidents of the Judicial Councils of the federal regions

- Vacant (Kurdistan Region)

== Responsibilities ==
The Supreme Judicial Council Law (Law No. 47 of 2017) grants the Council the following authorities:

- Managing the affairs of judicial bodies.
- Proposing the annual budget of the federal judiciary and submitting it to the Council of Representatives for approval.
- Nominating the members of the Federal Supreme Court from among the judges. (Note: Following the amendment of the Supreme Court Law in 2021, the Chief Justices of the Supreme Judicial Council, Supreme Court, Judicial Oversight Commission and Public Prosecutor’s Department were granted the authority to nominate and instate the Chief Justice of the Federal Supreme Court. The amendment also includes a clause that allows the bypassing of the President of the Republic, granting the aforementioned Chief Justices complete autonomy in this matter.)
- Nominating the President of the Federal Court of Cassation, its judges and the head of the Judicial Supervisory Authority and sending the nominations to the Council of Representatives for approval.
- Nominating those eligible for appointment as Vice President of the Federal Court of Cassation, President of the Federal Court of Appeals, and Vice President of the Judicial Supervisory Commission, and sending the nominations to the Council of Representatives for approval.
- Nominating those eligible for appointment as judges and sending the nominations to the Presidency of the Republic to issue a republican decree.
- Promoting judges in the federal courts, transferring them, assigning them, reassigning them, and managing their career affairs in accordance with the law.
- Extending the service of judges and retiring them in accordance with the law.
- Formation of judicial bodies and committees in the federal courts.
- Proposing draft laws related to the affairs of the federal judiciary.
- Ratifying judicial treaties and following up on their implementation in coordination with the Ministry of Justice.
- Forming the Judicial Affairs Committee in accordance with the law.

== See also ==
- Federal Supreme Court of Iraq
- Law of Iraq
