= List of members of the Kurdistan Region Parliament (2013–2019) =

Kurdistan Parliament پەرلەمانی كوردستان Perlemanî Kurdistan

Structure
- Seats: 111 Seats in the Assembly
- Political groups: Parties Represented in Parliament: KDP (38); Gorran (24); PUK (18); Yekgirtû (10); KIK (6); Others (4); Reserved for minorities (11)

The members of the Kurdistan Region Parliament for Fourth Term were elected on 21 September 2013.

== Members of the Kurdistan Region Parliament ==
Party	Name
Kurdistan Democratic Party (38)	Umed Abulrahman Hassan
Kurdistan Democratic Party (38)	Awaz Hamid Hussain
Kurdistan Democratic Party (38)	Edris Ali Islam
Kurdistan Democratic Party (38)	Tahssin Ismael Ahmed
Kurdistan Democratic Party (38)	Shirin Hassani Ramazan
Kurdistan Democratic Party (38)	Zozan Sadig Saed
Kurdistan Democratic Party (38)	Seraj Ahmed Muhammed
Kurdistan Democratic Party (38)	Shilan Jaafer Ali
Kurdistan Democratic Party (38)	Farhan Jawher Qader
Kurdistan Democratic Party (38)	Muhammed Sadiq Saed
Kurdistan Democratic Party (38)	Madinah Eyob
Kurdistan Democratic Party (38)	Hiva Haji Merxan
Kurdistan Democratic Party (38)	Vian Abbas Omar
Kurdistan Democratic Party (38)	Ari Hamad Abdulrahem
Kurdistan Democratic Party (38)	Anas Muhammed Sharif Taher
Kurdistan Democratic Party (38)	Bashar Musher Ismael
Kurdistan Democratic Party (38)	Jaafar Emaki
Kurdistan Democratic Party (38)	Abdullah Jasim Rajab
Kurdistan Democratic Party (38)	Ziyad Hussain Abdulkarim
Kurdistan Democratic Party (38)	Shamo Shikho Naemo
Kurdistan Democratic Party (38)	Abbas Gazali Merxan
Kurdistan Democratic Party (38)	Firsat Sofi Ali
Kurdistan Democratic Party (38)	Mohammedali Yaseen Taha
Kurdistan Democratic Party (38)	Nazim Kabir Muhammed
Kurdistan Democratic Party (38)	Valla Farid Ibrahim
Kurdistan Democratic Party (38)	Amina Zakri Saed
Kurdistan Democratic Party (38)	Ibrahim Ahmmed Sammo
Kurdistan Democratic Party (38)	Bayar Taher Saed
Kurdistan Democratic Party (38)	Jamal Ossman Karasol
Kurdistan Democratic Party (38)	Hayat Majed Qader
Kurdistan Democratic Party (38)	Dilshad Shaeban Qafar
Kurdistan Democratic Party (38)	Saleh Bashar Saleh
Kurdistan Democratic Party (38)	Shwan Ahmmed Numman
Kurdistan Democratic Party (38)	Ali Ali Hallu
Kurdistan Democratic Party (38)	Firz Taha Abdukhalq
Kurdistan Democratic Party (38)	Mardan Khader Mustafa
Kurdistan Democratic Party (38)	Najat Muhammed Abdullah
Kurdistan Democratic Party (38)	Vamman Faysal Saleem
Movement for Change (24)	Birzo Majeed
Movement for Change (24)	Anwar Qader Mustafa
Movement for Change (24)	Eyvar Ibrahim Hussain
Movement for Change (24)	Pari Salih Hamid
Movement for Change (24)	Raboon Maroof
Movement for Change (24)	Adel Aziz Shuker
Movement for Change (24)	Omar Enayaat
Movement for Change (24)	Mahmmud Haji Omar
Movement for Change (24)	Biston Fayeq Muhammed
Movement for Change (24)	Eyob Abdullah Ismael
Movement for Change (24)	Bahar Mahmmud Fatah
Movement for Change (24)	Jwan Ismael Aziz
Movement for Change (24)	Zulfa Mahmmud Abdullah
Movement for Change (24)	Abdulrahman Ali Reza
Movement for Change (24)	Fayeq Mustafa Rassul
Movement for Change (24)	Munira Osman Ali
Movement for Change (24)	Rozha Mahmmud Ossman
Movement for Change (24)	Umid Hama Ali
Movement for Change (24)	Perwa Ali Hama Muhammed
Movement for Change (24)	Hassan Salih Muhammed
Movement for Change (24)	Shirko Hama Amin
Movement for Change (24)	Ali Hama Salih
Movement for Change (24)	Qahrama Qadir Fatah
Movement for Change (24)	Yousif Muhammed
Patriotic Union of Kurdistan (18)	Daler Mustafa Hassan
Patriotic Union of Kurdistan (18)	Pigard Dilshad Shukrallah
Patriotic Union of Kurdistan (18)	Zana Abdullrahman Abdullah
Patriotic Union of Kurdistan (18)	Sarkawt Sarhad Khalifa
Patriotic Union of Kurdistan (18)	Ezzat Sabir Ismael
Patriotic Union of Kurdistan (18)	Gasha Dara Jalal
Patriotic Union of Kurdistan (18)	Rewaz Fayeq Hussain
Patriotic Union of Kurdistan (18)	Talar Latif Muhammed
Patriotic Union of Kurdistan (18)	Salar Mahmmud Murad
Patriotic Union of Kurdistan (18)	Salih Faqih Muhammed
Patriotic Union of Kurdistan (18)	Farhad Hama Salih
Patriotic Union of Kurdistan (18)	Goran Azad Muhammed
Patriotic Union of Kurdistan (18)	Awaz Janki Burhan
Patriotic Union of Kurdistan (18)	Khalaf Ahmmed Maeroof
Patriotic Union of Kurdistan (18)	Saed Muhammed Saed
Patriotic Union of Kurdistan (18)	Abbas Fattah Saleh
Patriotic Union of Kurdistan (18)	Qader Ossman Rassul
Patriotic Union of Kurdistan (18)	Maryam Samed Abdi
Kurdistan Islamic Union (10)	Abubakir Omar Abdullah
Kurdistan Islamic Union (10)	Bahar Abdulrahman Muhammed
Kurdistan Islamic Union (10)	Saham Omar Qader
Kurdistan Islamic Union (10)	Omar Saleh Omar
Kurdistan Islamic Union (10)	Kazhal Hadi Faqih
Kurdistan Islamic Union (10)	Sehrab Mikael Muhammed
Kurdistan Islamic Union (10)	Garib Mustafa Hama Khan
Kurdistan Islamic Union (10)	Bahzad Darwesh Darwesh
Kurdistan Islamic Union (10)	Shirko Jawdat Mustafa
Kurdistan Islamic Union (10)	Kanaan Najemdeen Ahmed
Kurdistan Islamic Group (6)	Fakher Aldeen Qader Aref
Kurdistan Islamic Group (6)	Hussain Ismael Hussain
Kurdistan Islamic Group (6)	Soran Omar
Kurdistan Islamic Group (6)	Najeba Latef Ahmed
Kurdistan Islamic Group (6)	Shukriyah Ismael Mustafa
Kurdistan Islamic Group (6)	Hawraman Hama Shareef Hama Rashid
Kurdistan Islamic Movement (1)	Omar Mustafa Bawa Meer
Kurdistan Socialist Democratic Party (1)	Abdullah Mahmmud Muhammed
Azadi List (1)	Abdulrahman Fares Abdulrahman
Kurdistan Toilers' Party (1)	Bapir Kaka Mala Sleman

=== Seats reserved for Turkmen ===
Party	Name
Turkmen Development List (2)	Jawdat Jarjis Latif Fatah
Turkmen Development List (2)	Muna Nabi Nadir
Erbil Turkmen (1)	AMajed Ousman Tofiq Sleman
Advance Turkman (1)	Mani Nabi Nadir Abdullah
Iraqi Turkmen Front (1)	Aydn Maruf Salim Ahmad

=== Assyrian minority reserved seats ===
Party	Name
Al-Rafidain List (2)	Lina Azarya Bahram Shabu
Al-Rafidain List (2)	Yaqub Gorgis Yaqo Klya
Chaldean Syriac Assyrian Popular Council (2)	Kamal Yalda Marquez Dmjnos
Chaldean Syriac Assyrian Popular Council (2)	Wahed Yako Hormuz
Sons of Mesopotamia (1)	Surod Saleem Mutta Yousef

=== Armenian minority reserved seat ===
Party	Name
Armenian list (1)	Burwant Nissan Markus Butres
