= Kurdistan Coalition =

Political coalition in Iraq (2021)

Kurdistan Coalition: هاوپەیمانیی کوردستان (Sorani Kurdish); تحالف کوردستان (Arabic)
- Leader: Qubad Talabani
- Founded: 2 July 2021; 5 years ago
- Dissolved: After the election
- Member parties: Patriotic Union of Kurdistan (PUK); Gorran Movement
- Slogan: Together, we are stronger
- Country: Iraq
- Seats in the Iraqi Council of Representatives (2021): 18 / 329

The Kurdistan Coalition or The Kurdistan Alliance (Sorani Kurdish: هاوپەیمانیی کوردستان / Arabic: تحالف كوردستان) was coalition formed between the Patriotic Union of Kurdistan (PUK) and the Gorran Movement (Movement for Change) for the 2021 Iraqi parliamentary election.

== Formation ==
=== Announcement ===
In may, 1 2021 PUK-Affiliated media, PUKmedia announced that for the 2021 Iraqi parliamentary election the Patriotic Union of Kurdistan will run alongside the Gorran Movement on a joint list.

=== Signing the Agreement ===
On June 20, 2021, The co-presidents of the PUK, Bafel Talabani and Lahur Sheikh Jangi alongside the general coordinator of Gorran, Omar Said Ali held a ceremony in Sulaymaniyah. In the ceremony the party leaders signed the agreement and officially announced the Coalition.

=== Leader ===
On July 29, 2021, in a meeting in the PUK political office in Sulaymaniyah. Where a co-president of the PUK, Bafel Talabani and the general coordinator of the Gorran Movement, Omar Said Ali were present they agreed on electing Qubad Talabani as the Leader of the Coalition for the 2021 Iraqi parliamentary election.

=== Slogan ===
The coalition's official slogan was "بە یەکەوە بەهێزترین" in Sorani Kurdish. which is "Together, we are Stronger" in English.

== Outcome ==
In the 2021 Iraqi parliamentary election, the coalition received 368,226 votes and secured 17 seats in the Iraqi Council of Representatives.

=== Change of seats ===
The coalition originally had 15 but after appeals, Iraq's electoral commission announced that there had been seat changes in Erbil, Mosul as well as 3 other provinces. following these changes the coalition gained 2 seats and their seats shiftes from 15 to 17.

Later on, the coalition went on to achieve one more seat with Kirkuk-based Independent seat holder, Dilan Ghafour announcing that she is Coalition-Affiliated. This made the coalition secure their 18th seat.

=== Gorran disappointment ===
Although the coalition secured 17 seats, all 17 seats were PUK-Affiliated and Gorran Affiliates had 0 seats.

== Gorran after the election ==
Following Gorran's defeat in the election and them winning 0 seats, the entire Gorran Executive Assembly including the general coordinator, Omar Said Ali resigned. A new Executive Assembly temporarily took over.
