= Rebwar Karim =

Iraqi Kurdish politician and academic

Rebwar Karim Mahmood
- ڕێبوار کەریم مەحمود
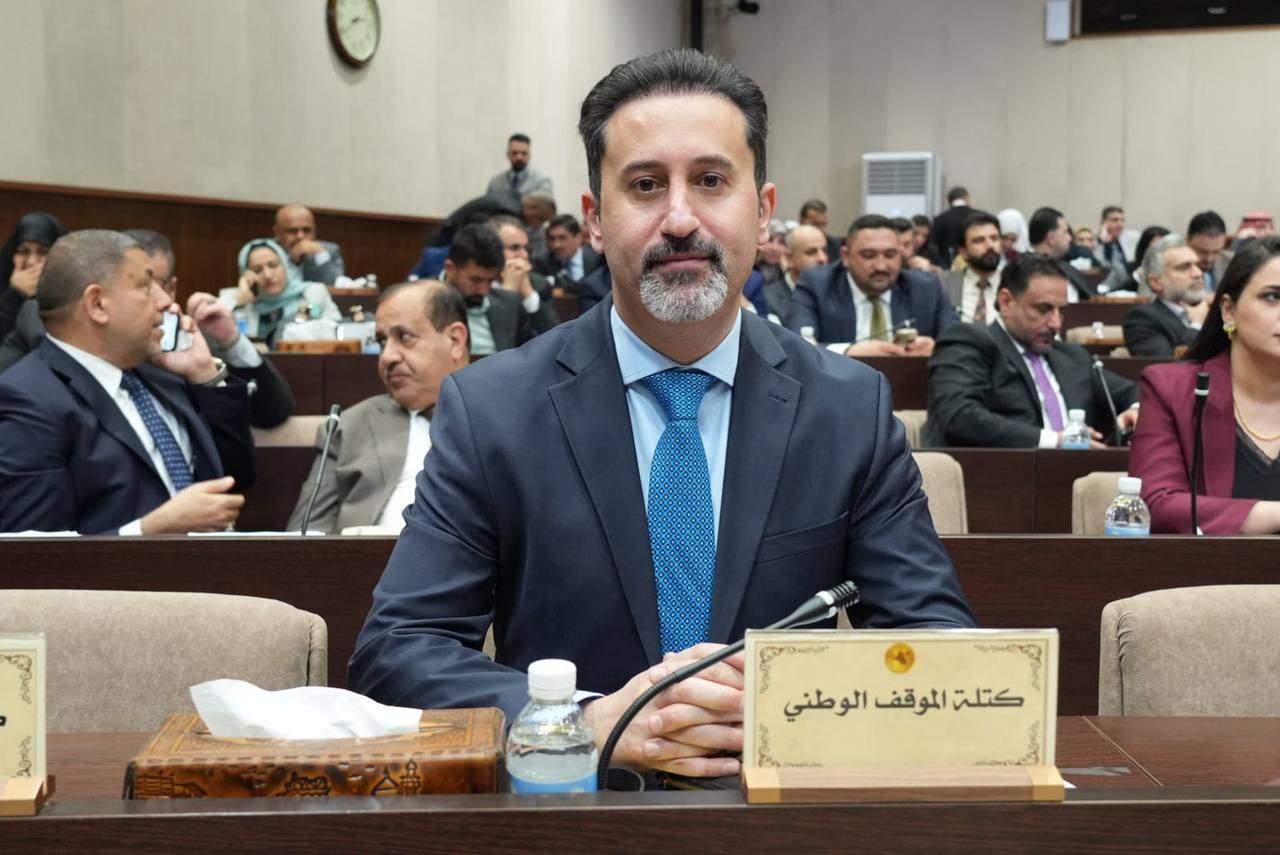
- Rebwar Karim in the Iraqi parliament

Member of the Council of Representatives
- Incumbent
- Assumed office 2025
- Parliamentary group: National Stance Movement
- Constituency: Sulaymaniyah
- In office 2018–2021
- Parliamentary group: Coalition for Democracy and Justice
- Constituency: Sulaymaniyah

Personal details
- Born: Rebwar Karim Mahmood; March 17, 1981 (age 45) Sulaymaniyah, Iraq
- Party: National Stance Movement
- Other political affiliations: Coalition for Democracy and Justice
- Education: Salahaddin University-Erbil (BA); University of Baghdad (MA); University of Sulaimani (PhD); Syracuse University
- Occupation: Politician, academic, author

Rebwar Karim Mahmood (Sorani Kurdish: ڕێبوار کەریم مەحموود, romanized: Rêbwar Kerîm Mehmûd; born 17 March 1981) is an Iraqi Kurdish politician, academic and author. He is a member of the Council of Representatives of Iraq and a member of the National Stance Movement (Halwest). He previously served as a member of the Iraqi parliament from 2018 to 2021.

== Early life and education ==
Rebwar Karim Mahmood was born on 17 March 1981 in Sulaymaniyah, Iraq.

He received a bachelor's degree in political science from the College of Law and Politics at Salahaddin University-Erbil in 2003. He subsequently obtained a master's degree in international relations from the University of Baghdad in 2006. In 2011, he received a PhD in political science and international relations from the University of Sulaimani.

== Political career ==
=== Coalition for Democracy and Justice ===
Mahmood became involved in the Coalition for Democracy and Justice (CDJ), a political party led by former Iraqi Kurdistan Prime Minister Barham Salih. He served as a spokesperson for the party and was involved in discussions concerning opposition cooperation ahead of the 2018 elections.

During the 2018 Iraqi parliamentary election, Mahmood was a candidate for the CDJ in Sulaymaniyah Governorate. He was elected to the Council of Representatives of Iraq and served during the parliament's fourth term.

=== 2025 parliamentary election ===
Mahmood contested the 2025 Iraqi parliamentary election as a candidate for the National Stance Movement in Sulaymaniyah Governorate. He received 6,441 votes and was elected to the Council of Representatives.

=== Candidacy for second deputy speaker ===
On 29 December 2025, Mahmood contested the election for the position of second deputy speaker of the Iraqi parliament.

In the first round, Mahmood received 153 votes, while Shakhawan Abdullah received 119. Neither candidate secured the required majority, resulting in another round of voting.

Mahmood subsequently faced Farhad Atrushi of the Kurdistan Democratic Party in the final contest. Atrushi was elected second deputy speaker, while Mahmood was defeated.

== Publications ==
Mahmood has published articles concerning political parties, civil society, democracy, Iraqi politics, the Kurdistan Region and international relations.

== See also ==
- Ali Hama Saleh
- National Stance Movement
- Coalition for Democracy and Justice
