= Bahdinan prisoners =

Arrest of four journalists and an activist in the Kurdistan region of Iraq

Bahdinan Prisoners Case
- Court: Hewler (Erbil) Court of Crimes
- Full case name: Kurdistan Regional Government vs. Sherwan Sherwani et al.
- Decided: 16 February 2021

Case history
- Prior action: Arrest of defendants in 2020
- Subsequent actions: Public and international backlash

Keywords
- Freedom of the press; Spying; Journalism; Kurdistan Region; Political repression

Bahdinan prisoners is used to refer to the arrest of a group of four journalists and an activist in the Bahdinan area of Kurdistan Region. The term only became used when the group were convicted of spying by the KDP on 16 February 2021. The term was used by the speaker of parliament Rewaz Faeq to refer to the trial whilst the president of the current government Necirvan Barzani only referred to the case "punished Bahdinis". The best known journalist amongst them is Sherwan Sherwani whom CPJ has highlighted his case before the trial. Sherwani was editor-in-chief of Bashur (in Bahdini) magazine, was arrested in the early hours of October 7, 2020, at home in Sabiran (village outside Erbil).

== Conviction ==
The trial was a two day session at Hewler Court of Crimes. According to Ali Hamasaleh who was at the trial, the group were accused of having collaborated on a Facebook Messenger chat group exchanging information which the KDP authorities say were "spying" for foreign powers. The group of five are:

- Sherwan Amin Sherwani
- Ayas Akram
- Guhdar Mohammed Zebari
- Hariwan Issa
- Shivan Saeed Berozhky

== Backlash ==
The trial comes at a time when the region itself is going through protests against corruption and cutting public servant salaries by the Kurdish government. The CPJ as well as other organisations have release statements denouncing the sentence and the process. The US consulate in Erbil (Kurdistan Region capital) where the trial took place also released a statement. The internal pressure is known even from Barzani family with the press release by Necirvan Barzani.
