= Maroof =

Maroof is a masculine given name. It is derived from the Arabic word "ma'ruf" (Arabic: معروف) or "miftahul ma'ruf", an Islamic term meaning that which is commonly known or acknowledged. Notable people with the name include:

== Given name ==
- Maroof Afzal (died 2020), Pakistani civil servant
- Maroof Raza (1959–2026), Indian Army officer

== Surname ==
- Bismah Maroof (born 1991), Pakistani international cricketer
- Rabun Maroof (born 1976), Iraqi Kurdish politician

== Places ==
- Maroof, Gujrat
