= Change List =

Change List may refer to:

- Change List (Revision Control), the set of changes made in a single commit in a revision control system
- Change List, an Iraqi Kurdish political party, also known as Movement for Change (Kurdish: Lîstî Gorran) or Gorran ("Change")
