= Dilan Ghafour =

Iraqi Kurdish Politician (Born 28 June 1980)

- دیلان غەفور

Member of the Iraqi Parliament
- Incumbent
- Assumed office 2025
- Parliamentary group: Patriotic Union of Kurdistan
- Constituency: Kirkuk
- In office 2021–2025
- Parliamentary group: Kurdistan Coalition (Ran independently, announced affiliation with the Kurdistan Coalition later)
- Constituency: Kirkuk
- In office 2018–2021
- Parliamentary group: Patriotic Union of Kurdistan
- Constituency: Kirkuk

Personal details
- Born: June 28, 1980 (age 46) Kirkuk, Ba'athist Iraq
- Party: Patriotic Union of Kurdistan (PUK)
- Other political affiliations: Kurdistan Coalition (2021-2025 parliament term) (PUK-affiliated)
- Occupation: Politician
- Nickname: Dilan Mamosta Ghafour

Dilan Ghafour Salih (Sorani Kurdish: دیلان غەفور ساڵح / Arabic: دیلان غفور صالح) or known as simply Dilan Ghafour (Sorani Kurdish: دیلان غەفور / Arabic: ديلان غفور) (Born 28 June 1980) is an Iraqi Kurdish politician who has served in the Iraqi Council of Representatives since 2018. Ghafour is also an active member of the Patriotic Union of Kurdistan.

== Early life ==
Ghafour was born on June 28, 1980, in Kirkuk, Ba'athist Iraq.

== Political career ==
Ghafour has served as a member of the Iraqi Council of Representatives for three terms.

=== 2018 Iraqi parliamentary election ===
In the 2018 Iraqi parliamentary election, Ghafour was a candidate for the Patriotic Union of Kurdistan in Kirkuk Governorate. She received 12,509 votes and secured a seat in the Iraqi parliament.

==== Economy & Investments Committee ====
For the Fourth term of the Iraqi parliament, on November 10, 2018, Ghafour was elected as a member of the Economy & Investments Committee in the Parliament.

=== 2021 Iraqi parliamentary election ===
For the 2021 Iraqi parliamentary election Ghafour ran as an independent candidate She received 21,510 votes and secured a seat in the parliament.

Although Ghafour ran independently for the election she later on announced that she is affiliated with the Kurdistan Coalition between the Patriotic Union of Kurdistan and the Gorran Movement.

==== Foreign Relations committee ====
On May 11, 2022, Ghafour was elected as a member of the Foreign Relations Committee for the fifth term in the Iraqi parliament.

On January 29, 2023, Ghafour was elected as the chairperson of the committee, with Jabar al-Kinnani and Wasi al-Aasi and her deputies.

=== 2025 Iraqi parliamentary election ===
For the 2025 Iraqi parliamentary election Ghafour was candidate number 7 for the Patriotic Union of Kurdistan (PUK) in Kirkuk. Ghafour received 6,865 votes and secured a seat in the Iraqi parliament.

==== Finance Committee ====
On April 9, 2026, Ghafour was elected as a member of the Finance Committee in the Iraqi parliament.
