= Dana Ahmed Majid =

Iraqi Kurdish politician (Born 1957)

General coordinator of The Gorran Movement
- Incumbent
- Assumed office 16 February 2026
- Preceded by: Himself (Acting)
- Acting General Coordinator of Gorran
- In office 28 September 2024 – 16 February 2026
- Preceded by: Omar Said Ali
- Succeeded by: Himself

Governor of Sulaymaniyah
- In office 28 May 2005 – 7 December 2009
- Preceded by: None
- Succeeded by: Behroz Kashan

Head of Asayish
- In office 1 October 2003 – 31 April 2005
- Preceded by: None
- Succeeded by: Sarkoat Kubba

Personal details
- Born: 1957 (age 68–69) Sulaymaniah, Iraq
- Party: Movement for Change
- Other political affiliations: Patriotic Union of Kurdistan
- Education: University of Sulaimani
- Profession: Geologist

Dana Ahmed Majid (born 1957) (Sorani Kurdish: دانا ئەحمەد مەجید / Arabic: دانا أحمد مجيد) is an Iraqi Kurdish politician, he is the General Coordinator of The Gorran Movement. he served as the acting general coordinator of The Gorran Movement from September 28, 2024 until February 16, 2026, when he was officially elected and appointed as the General Coordinator of The Gorran Movement. he previously served as The Governor of Sulaymaniah and The Head of Asayish (Security forces in Kurdistan Region).

== Early life ==
Dana Ahmed Majid was born on March 6, 1956, in Malkandi Neighborhood in Sulaymaniyah.

in 1974 he studied geology at The University of Sulaimani but stopped after 2 years due to political and fighting reasons

== Career ==
=== Serving as a peshmarga ===
in 1974, Dana Ahmed Majid became a peshmarga and served for a long time. in the 1980s he took on the role as a commander in multiple fighting teams.

in 1986 until 1988 he was the supervisor for Patriotic Union of Kurdistan (PUK) relations in Yakhmasar. and after Anfal until 1991 he was responsible for PUK relations with Iran in Kermanshah.

=== Political career ===
After The Uprising in 1991, Dana Ahmed Majid took on many diplomatic and governmental positions.

- from 1993 until 2001 he was the supervisor of PUK relations in Syria.
- on October 1, 2003, he was appointed as the Head of Asayish (Security Forces of Kurdistan Region). He served until April 31, 2005.
- on May 28, 2005, after The 2005 Kurdistan Region parliamentary election he was appointed as The Governor of Sulaymaniyah. he served as The Governor until December 7, 2009.

=== General coordinator of gorran ===
he was appointed as the acting general coordinator of The Gorran Movement on September 28, 2024 and served until February 16, 2026, when he was officially appointed as the General Coordinator.
