= Operation Fath 1 =

1986 Iraqi defeat in the Iran–Iraq War

- Part of Iran–Iraq War – Northern Front
Date	11–12 October 1986 (2 days)
Location	Kirkuk area, northern Iraq
Result	Iranian and Kurdish victory

Belligerents
Iraq	Iran; Patriotic Union of Kurdistan (PUK)

Commanders and leaders
	(Iran) Yahya Rahim Safavi (deputy commander of IRGC) (Iran) Mohammad-Baqer Zolqadr (IRGC commander of the operation); Jalal Talabani (leader of PUK); Nawshirwan Mustafa (Peshmerga commander of the operation)

Strength
Unknown	Iran: IRGC: 400 (not all of them engaged); PUK: Peshmerga: 2,000 partisans

Casualties and losses
600 killed and wounded, dozens captured 1 helicopter destroyed	Iran: None, several lightly wounded PUK: Unknown, but minimal

Operation Fath 1 (Persian: عملیات فتح 1, meaning "conquest"), also known as Operation Wahdat (the Kurdish code-name), was a joint Iranian and Iraqi Kurdish military operation conducted during the Iran-Iraq War by Iran's IRGC special forces and Kurdish separatist militants of the Patriotic Union of Kurdistan (PUK) in 11 and 12 October 1986 in Kirkuk area of northern Iraq. The Iranian and Kurdish forces infiltrated into the area and successfully attacked economic and military targets with minimal losses of their own.

== The operation ==
The operation was planned after an alliance between Iran and the Patriotic Union of Kurdistan (PUK) of Iraqi Kurdistan, which was opposed to Saddam Hussein's government. It was the first major joint operation between Iranian and Iraqi Kurdish forces, and the first of the series of "Fath" joint operations conducted by the extraterritorial Ramazan Headquarters of IRGC and Iraqi Kurdish fighters. One of the main aims of these operations in the Northern Front was to avoid concentration of Iraqi military in the Southern Front.

IRGC forces and Peshmerga partisans conducted a well-planned infiltration and a surprise attack against important industrial and military infrastructures in Kirkuk area. Several facilities of the Kirkuk Oil Refinery, Petroleum Production Unit Number 1, Kirkuk Thermal Power Station, three SAM sites, Jambur, Jabal Bur, and Shwaru oil and gas separation facilities at south Kirkuk, an eavesdropping, signals intelligence and parasite site at Saqqezli, Darman military base, and a train station were destroyed, and headquarters of the Iraqi Army I Corps, 8th Division, Iraqi Intelligence Service, and MeK came under fire. 600 Iraqi forces were killed or wounded according to Iran. There was no Iranian casualties. IRGC field commanders had planned to destroy the Kirkuk Refinery using C4 explosives, but it was decided by top commanders to reduce the mission to attack from the nearby hills, since corpses of Iranian forces on the ground could be used by Iraqi government for propaganda purposes.

The 150 tonnes of military equipment and their 300 IRGC operators were transferred from Iran to Kirkuk behind enemy lines in a covert operation lasting for 40 days. The equipment was as follows:

Weapon	Quantity
Kalashnikov rifle	1,500
B.K.C machine gun	40
DShK	15
RPG-7	60
120 mm mortar	3
81 mm mortar	2
120 mm mortar shells	1,500
81 mm mortar shells	1,000
60 mm mortar shells	500
60 mm gun rounds	500
107 mm gun rounds	2,000
RPG rockets	7,354
Kalashnikov rounds	21,500
B.K.C rounds	10,000
DShK rounds	12,000

Various vehicles as well as mules were used for the transportation of the equipment from north-western Iran to near the Kirkuk through highlands. The route was 150 km long. All of the equipment was transferred back by the IRGC forces to Iran after the operation. Iranian forces scattered in Iraqi Kurdistan and then returned to Iran.

== Units ==
=== Iran ===
Islamic Revolutionary Guard Corps:

- Ramazan Headquarters:
  Commanded by Mohammad-Baqer Zolqadr
  - 66th Airborne Special Brigade
    Commanded by Mohsen Shafaq
    - 7 platoons, 20 demolition units (230 personnel), supposed to be commanded by Sadegh Mahsouli
  - 75th Zafar Special Brigade
  - Equipment Group
    Commanded by Gholam Pakrooh
  - Active Protection System Group
    Commanded by Booyaghchi
  - Engineering Demolition Group
    Commanded by Mohammad Asipoor
  - Medical Services Group
    Commanded by Naderi
  - Communication Group
    Commanded br Bifan

=== PUK ===
Peshmerga:

- تیپ21 کرکوک به فرماندهی کاک سیروان.
- تیپ25 خلفان به فرماندهی کاک ملا ارس.
- تیپ93 کوی سنجق به فرماندهی کاک ملا ابراهیم.
- تیپ23 یورداش به فرماندهی کاک نبغه.
- تیپ78 قره‌چرخ به فرماندهی کاک صفین.
- تیپ68 دشت هوله به فرماندهی کاک مام غفور.
- تیپ برانتی به فرماندهی کاک هیمن.
- تیپ51 گرمیان به فرماندهی کاک محمود لنگاوی.
- تیپ53 تیروانه به فرماندهی کاک عادل.
- تیپ57 سیگرمه به فرماندهی کاک آزاد.
- تیپ55 قره‌داغ به فرماندهی کاک آوات.

و دو تیپ حفاظتی مالبند (منطقه‌ی) 1و2 اتحادیه*

== In popular culture ==
Kirkuk Operation (Persian: عملیات کرکوک) is a 1991 Iranian movie directed and written by Jamal Shoorjeh.
