= Sherwan Sherwani =

Kurdish investigative journalist

- شێروان شێروانی
- Born: 1983 (age 42–43); Akre, Kurdistan Region, Iraq
- Occupation: Investigative journalist
- Organization: Bashur
- Criminal charges: Espionage; Incitement to protest
- Criminal penalty: Six years imprisonment
- Criminal status: Detained

Sherwan Sherwani (Kurdish: شێروان شێروانی; born 1983) is a Kurdish journalist known for his work investigating corruption within the Government of the Kurdistan Region, the executive body of the Kurdistan Region in Iraq. He has been detained since 2020 and has had his original six-year prison sentence increased on multiple occasions, most recently in August 2025.

== Biography ==
Sherwani was born in Akre.

Sherwani rose to prominence as a noted independent journalist in Duhok Governorate writing for outlets including Awena, Livin and Hawlaty. Sherwani was the founder and editor-in-chief of Bashur, a monthly magazine which published investigations into corruption cases, as well as the murders of journalists and writers, in the Kurdistan Region, publishing in both Sorani and Kurmanji. Sherwani also reported on prisoners' rights, particularly those held in prisons run by Asayish, a Kurdish security and intelligence organisation.

In addition to his journalism, Sherwani was also an active member of 17 Shubat for Human Rights, a human rights organisation based in Erbil.

Sherwani was first arrested in 2012 and detained for six days after publishing an article in Bashur exposing a corruption case involving a municipal officer in Duhok. After he was released, Sherwani was sued for defamation.

In 2019, Sherwani was arrested while covering a protest at the Iraq–Turkey border.

In October 2020, Sherwani was arrested, alongside four other journalists and activists, by Asayish officers, on charges of "espionage" and "incitement to protest and destabilise the region" after taking part in protests against corruption. It was alleged that Sherwani was tortured during the investigation. On 16 February 2021, Sherwani was sentenced to six years in prison by the Erbil Criminal Code for multiple offences, including spying on behalf of foreign agents (including the Kurdish Workers Party) and putting at risk the lives of senior Kurdish regional and foreign officials.

On 2 March 2022, Sherwani's sentence was reduced following a presidential decree by Nechirvan Barzani, the President of the Kurdistan Region. In July 2023, shortly before Sherwani's planned release, he was sentenced to an additional four years' imprisonment on charges of falsifying a document for a fellow imprisoned journalist, Guhdar Zebari. Zebari wrote a statement in which he stated he had given Sherwani permission to sign a petition on his behalf; this evidence was dismissed by the judge. At the same time, Sherwani was also given a six-month custodial sentence for allegedly altering the logo of his car.

On 19 August 2025, Sherwani was sentenced to an additional four years and five months' imprisonment for threatening a police officer by the Bnaslawa Misdemeanour Court in Erbil; he had been due to be released from prison on 9 September 2025. Sherwani's lawyer stated that this stemmed from a June 2022 complaint filed by a prison officer at the Erbil Adult Prison in which they accused Sherwani of threatening him and his family. Sherwani was found guilty of breaking article 229 of the Iraqi Penal Code which made a crime threatening or assaulting state employees. The evidence against Sherwani was solely the statement by the officer as well as statements from two other officers who were witnesses. Sherwani denied making the threat. Witnesses stated that there had been physical altercations between security forces and members of Sherwani's family at the hearing.

The additional charges levied against Sherwani since his initial arrest in 2020 have been criticised by local and international human rights organisations. Amnesty International described Sherwani's initial trial in 2021 as "grossly unfair", and stated his 2025 trial was "a blatant ruse by the authorities to keep him behind bars", further adding that the trial had been marred by a "complete lack of due process". The Committee to Protect Journalists called on Kurdish authorities to immediately release Sherwani.

Community Peacemaker Teams – Iraqi Kurdistan called the 2023 charges against Sherwani as being politically motivated. CPT-IK observed his 2025 trial and published a report describing it as containing "major violations" including a lack of proper evidence and procedures, the defence being prevented from challenging the validity of the evidence, unjust sentencing, the militarisation of the court room, and the use of plainclothes officers to "agitate and assault" civilians waiting outside the court room.

Ali Hama Saleh, a member of the Kurdistan Region Parliament from the National Stance Movement, observed Sherwani's 2025 trial and stated that there was "no evidence" against him.

The United Nations Assistance Mission for Iraq raised concerns that Sherwani's 2025 sentence may have been "disproportionate" and "arbitrary", stating that the court did not provide evidence of the "aggravating circumstances" used to justify the severity of Sherwani's sentence. Ihsan Abdul Rahman, the director general for prison reforms at the Ministry of Labour and Social Affairs of the Government of the Kurdistan Region, stated he could not comment on the sentence until he had met with Sherwani, but denied reports that he had been prevented from speaking to his lawyer or to his family.

In 2025, Sherwani was nominated for the Nobel Peace Prize, alongside Syrian Kurdish politician Îlham Ehmed. In September 2025, a group of 17 non-governmental organisations, including the Committee to Protect Journalists, Reporters Without Borders, Community Peacemaker Teams, MENA Rights Group, Democracy for the Arab World Now, Cartoonists Rights Network International and the Egyptian Initiative for Personal Rights, called for Sherwani's immediate release.

As of January 2026, Sherwani is being held at Gewran Prison in Erbil. On 22 April 2026, he announced he had started a hunger strike after prison authorities rejected his application for temporary leave to return home, and for a transfer to the Sulaymaniyah Correctional Institution.
