= Rozhnama =

- Type: Daily newspaper
- Format: Compact
- Owner(s): Wusha corp
- Editor: Azad Chalak
- Founded: 2007
- Political alignment: Centrist (sometimes said to be center-left)
- Language: Kurdish
- Headquarters: Sulaimaniyah, Iraqi Kurdistan
- Price: Iraqi Dinars 500
- Website: Official website

Rozhnama (English: Daily Paper) is a Kurdish daily newspaper, it hopes to become the first Kurdish newspaper of record.

Rozhnama was founded in 2007 at the behest of Nawshirwan Mustafa, who claimed he wanted a daily newspaper in the Kurdistan region which had complete editorial independence. The newspaper is printed using the latest Heidelberg press.
