= Nawshirwan Mustafa =

Iraqi Kurdish politician

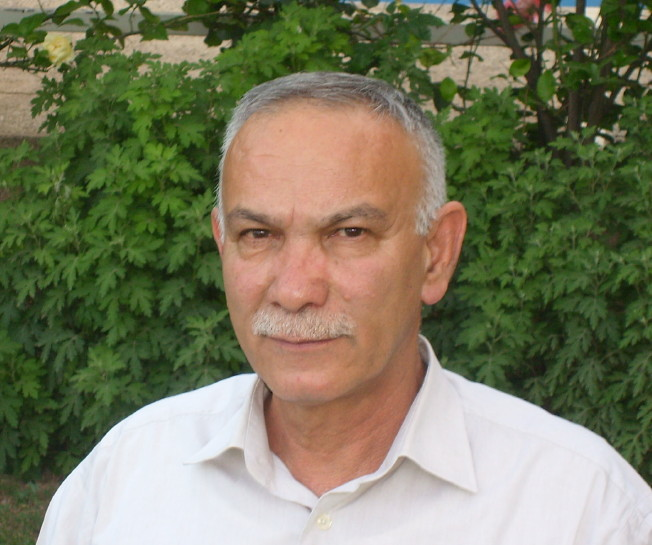
- Nawshirwan Mustafa

General coordinator of the Movement for Change (Gorran)
- In office 1 April 2009 – 19 May 2017
- Preceded by: Position established
- Succeeded by: Omar Said Ali

Deputy Secretary General of the Patriotic Union of Kurdistan
- In office 1 November 1976 – 30 November 2006
- Preceded by: Kosrat Rasul Ali

Personal details
- Born: 22 December 1944 Sulaymaniyah, Kingdom of Iraq
- Died: 19 May 2017 (aged 72) Sulaymaniyah, Kurdistan Region, Iraq
- Citizenship: Iraq & UK
- Party: Movement for Change
- Other political affiliations: Patriotic Union of Kurdistan; Kurdistan Democratic Party (Youth Branch)
- Occupation: Politician
- Profession: Historian, Author, Scholar, Revolutionary, Peshmerga (Guerilla) Commander

Military service
- Allegiance: Patriotic Union of Kurdistan
- Branch/service: Peshmerga
- Battles/wars: Iran–Iraq War; Operation Fath 1; Operation Zafar 7; Kurdish–Turkish conflict; Operation Northern Iraq

Nawshirwan Mustafa (22 December 1944 – 19 May 2017) (Kurdish: نەوشیروان مستەفا) was an Iraqi Kurdish politician who served as the General Coordinator of the Movement for Change and the leader of the opposition in the Kurdistan Region from 1 April 2009 to his death on 19 May 2017.

== Early life ==
Nawshirwan Mustafa was born on 22 December 1944 in the old quarter of Sulaymaniyah, Iraq, the son of Mustafa Émin Khider. Sulaymaniyah has been home to the Mustafa Émin Khider family since the city was established in 1784. Unlike Kurdistan's other prominent political leaders Masoud Barzani and Jalal Talabani, Mustafa hails from a city, not a village, and is not a member of a tribe, Nawshirwan built his reputation on being a republican who opposed family rule and hereditary political parties.

Mustafa attended the Royal King Faisal school in Sulaymaniyah and was also taught foreign languages by private tutors at an early age. He went on to study political science at Baghdad University and international law at Vienna University.

He also spoke German, English, Arabic and Persian.

== Political, military and media career 1960–2017 ==
=== Kurdistan Democratic Party ===
Mustafa joined KDP in 1960 where he was active in the youth branch. He allied himself with Barzani's opponents in the politburo and resigned from the party before the KDP split, he did not accept hereditary nature of the party.

=== Razgari Magazine ===
Mustafa published the Razgari magazine in 1968, which represented the views of nationalists calling for greater autonomy for Kurds.

=== Komala Ranjdaran ===
Mustafa was Secretary General of the clandestine Komalai Ranjdaran also known as Revolutionary Organization of Toilers of Kurdistan or Kurdistan Toilers League which was dissolved into the PUK in 1992. Komala was influenced by Marxism–Leninism and Maoism. In 1970 Mustafa was sentenced to death by the Revolutionary Court in Baghdad. As a result, he went into exile in Austria.

=== Patriotic Union of Kurdistan ===
PUK represented three different movements: the "Green Line", consisting mainly of Talabani's personal followers, the Marxist–Leninist Komala, and the Socialist Movement of Kurdistan, the most influential of these groups was Mustafa's Komala Randjaran.

During the late 1970s through the early '90s, Mustafa was the commander in chief of Peshmerga forces, conducting a guerrilla war against the Iraqi Ba'athist army and government. After inflicting serious damage on the better equipped Iraqi army, the Ba'athist government turned to chemical warfare. Using biological weapons such as nerve gas and mustard gas, Saddam Hussein initiated the Anfal Campaign in early 1987, with sustained use of chemical weapons and the mass genocide of hundreds of thousands of Kurdish civilians.

In 1988, Mustafa, with Talabani and the leadership of PUK, decided to initiate a tactical retreat to the Iranian border in the hope that Saddam would end the Anfal Campaign. Over the course of the next three years, Mustafa oversaw the reorganisation of the Peshmerga Forces whilst creating sleeper cells within the major Iraqi Kurdish cities of As-Sulaymaniyah, Arbil, Mosul and Kirkuk. During this period, Mustafa made plans for a popular uprising, which would be initiated by the sleeper cells, and supported by the newly organised Peshmerga battalions which were placed along the Iraqi/Iranian border.

In the spring of 1991, Mustafa, initiated his plan and on 5 March the town of Rania was liberated from Iraqi forces. Mustafa oversaw and conducted the operation, which resulted in the liberation of all the major cities, ending with the liberation of Kirkuk on 21 March 1991. Mustafa is known as the architect of the uprising because he oversaw the liberation of Kurdistan of Iraq for the first time since the creation of the state of Iraq. This subsequent autonomy has led to the current Kurdistan Regional government which is an autonomous region in Northern Iraq.

In the 1980s, he had the primary role in the PUK's numerous attacks on the communist groups. In 1983, Mustafa led the PUK forces to attack the Communist Party of Iraq's main base in the village Piştaşan, killing 150 communists.

In July 2000, the Patriotic Union of Kurdistan attacked the bases of Worker-communist Party and organizations close to it. During the attacks five were killed and some injured, also hundreds of party members were arrested. In 2011 Worker-communist Party of Kurdistan filed a lawsuit against Nawshirwan Mustafa and four other PUK senior members at that time as the responsible for the attacks.

=== Media ===
Mustafa has had a long history of pushing for free media in the region. In an interview with the London-based Asharq Al-Awsat on 31 May 2003, he stated Iraq and Kurdistan need to "enact news laws that live up to the spirit of the age and are in line with the principles of human rights and civil society."

In March 2007, Mustafa established the Wusha Corporation in Sulaimaniyah. When asked why he had established such a vast media outlet, he stated, "We have attempted to change Kurdish politics from the inside, now let us attempt it from the outside."

He established the Wusha Corporation which consisted of, Kurdish News Network, TV news channel, Rozhnama, weekly newspaper, Sbeiy.com, news website, Dangi Gorran, Kurdish–Arabic radio station.

The company's newspaper, Rozhnama, heavily criticized Jalal Talabani for deciding in March 2008 to sack party members from the PUK for speaking out against politicians in the press.

=== Movement for Change ===
Mustafa founded Gorran in 2009 and was its leader until 2017.

Mustafa in 2011 called for holding new elections, dissolution of the Kurdistan regional government, dissolution of parliament, separating the armed forces from politics and returning illegally acquired wealth by parties and individuals to the people.

=== Republicanism and rivalry with the Barzanis and Talabanis ===
Nawshirwan built his reputation on being a republican who opposed family rule and hereditary political parties. Mustafa challenged not only Talabanis but also Barzanis, by describing them as outmoded tribal leaders and that they run the Kurdistan Region along the same dictatorial lines of an ex-Soviet republic and is, in effect, a one-party state in control of every aspect of life. Both Barzanis and Talabanis stood accused by Mustafa of turning the regional government into a family business, empowering and enriching members of their own families, relatives, close associates, and party members and alienating nonpartisan Kurds. Mustafa disapproved of Talabanis close alliance with Barzani and also disliked Barzanis for historical and ideological reasons and accused the Barzanis of enriching themselves from Kurdistans economy.

KDP controlled Erbil court issued an arrest warrant for Mustafa, after he attempted to topple Barzani from the KRG presidency by amending the presidency law through parliament, the charges were called politically motivated and fabricated by his party at the time. The KDP also expelled four of his ministers from the KRG cabinet and the speaker of parliament was barred from entering the capital Erbil as well as ordering the closure of Gorran's TV channel KNN in the cities of Erbil and Duhok in retaliation for Mustafas attempt to change the presidency law.

In November 2011, Jalal Talabani sent a delegation to "seek reconciliation" with Mustafa. The delegation was told that "Talabani should reconcile with the People, not with Gorran" and that "we do not have any personal issue with Talabani." The speedy attempt at reconciliation by Talabani was seen as a fearful response to Mustafa's one on one meeting with Barzani, in which Talabani was fearful that Barzani may seek Mustafa as his new political ally. Mustafa has refused to meet Talabani despite his various requests. The relationship between the one time friends had reached a low after the two traded accusations about each other's actions during the Kurdish revolution in the media.

=== Arrest warrant and defamation lawsuit ===
An Erbil court under KDP Barzani instruction issued an arrest warrant for the General Coordinator of Gorran (Change Movement) Nawshirwan Mustafa. Nawshirwan also faced a defamation lawsuit from the KDP that was aimed at setting a precedent that will negatively affect the press in the region and would have a negative effect on journalists.

=== Death and legacy ===
Mustafa died in his hometown of Sulaymaniyah in the early hours of 19 May 2017 and was buried on 20 May 2017. While it hasn't been confirmed, he is thought to have died of pneumonia.

Mustafa's legacy has been tainted by his two sons Nma and Chia who have been embroiled in multiple corruption scandals and are held largely responsible for Gorran's demise by former and current members. Gorran has become everything Nawshirwan was against, for example he was against corrupt, family-run political parties, and political parties becoming a family based company.

== Publications ==
- La kanārī Dānubawa bo khaṛī Nāwzang:political events in Iraqi Kurdistan from 1975 to 1978. Kurdistan: Zargata. 1997.
- Panjakan yaktari ashkenin: political events in Iraqi Kurdistan from 1979 to 1983. Kurdistan: Zargata. 1997. ISBN 3-9806140-3-4.
- Khulāna la bāznadā: the inside story of events in Iraqi Kurdistan 1984-1988. Kurdistan: Meľbenî Awedanî Kurdistan. 1999. ISBN 3-9806140-3-4.
- Kurd u Ejam. Kurdistan: Zargata. 1992.
- Hukumati Kurdistan: Kurd le gemey Sovieti da. Kurdistan: K.I.B. 1993. ISBN 90-900635-6-0.
- Mīrāyatī Bābān lah nǐwān bardāshī R̮ǔm ū ʻAjamʹdā. Kurdistan: Melbendî Awedanî Kurdistan. 1998. ISBN 3-9806140-1-8.
- Kurdistanî ʻÊraq: serdemî qełem u muraceʻat, 1928-1931. Kurdistan: Zargata. 2000.
- Jian: Be tementirîn rōjnamey kurdî 1926 - 1938. Kurdistan: Zargata. 2002.
- Jian: Çend lapereyek le mêjûy rojnamewaniy Kurdî, 1938-1958: rojnamewaniy nihênî. Kurdistan: Zargata. 2004.
- Karesati Hekari. Kurdistan: Zargata. 1981.
- Kêşey Partî û Yekêtî. Kurdistan: Zargata. 1995.
- Ême û Ewan. Kurdistan: Zargata. 2009.
- Edeb û Tarikhi Kurdi. Kurdistan: Zargata. 2012.
