= Ali Hama Saleh =

Iraqi Kurdish politician

- عەلی حەمە ساڵح تەها
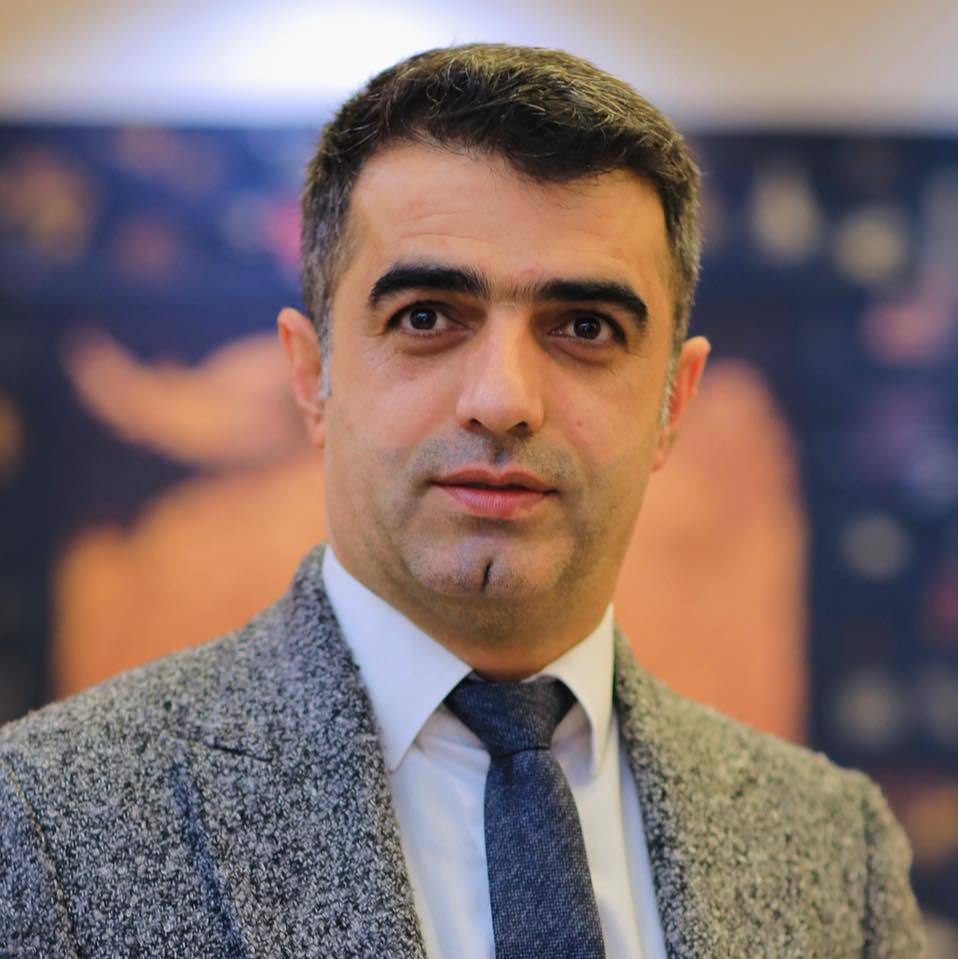

Member of the Kurdistan Region Parliament
- 6th term: Kurdistan Region Parliament
- Parliamentary group: National Stance Movement
- Constituency: Sulaymaniyah

Leader of the National Stance Movement
- Incumbent
- Assumed office 19 March 2024
- Preceded by: Position established

Personal details
- Born: 16 April 1984 (age 42) Darbandikhan, Slemani
- Party: Halwest
- Other party: Gorran Movement

Ali Hama Saleh Taha (Kurdish: عەلی حەمە ساڵح تەها, romanised: Elî Heme Saleh Teha, born 16 April 1984) is an Iraqi Kurdish politician, anti-corruption activist and former television presenter. He was a member of the Kurdistan Region Parliament during its fourth and fifth terms between 2013 and 2023, and founded the National Stance Movement (Halwest) party in 2024.

== Biography ==
Saleh became known as a television show host on Nawshirwan Mustafa's Kurdish News Network. He gained the nickname "The Calculator" for detailed financial breakdowns of land and oil deals and parliamentary benefits that he alleged to represent corruption.

He was elected to the Kurdistan Region Parliament as a member of the Gorran Movement in 2013 with 139,000 votes. At the time of the 2018 corruption scandal in the party, provoked by the seizure of party assets by its late founder Nawshirwan Mustafa's American- or British-educated sons Çiya and Nima, he was reported to be close to Mustafa's sons and publicly contested the allegations against them.

He was regarded as the most active and reputable MP during the fifth term of the Kurdistan Region Parliament (2019–2023). In 2021, he attended the trial of journalist Sherwan Sherwani in Erbil and spoke out against Sherwani's conviction on the charges of "gathering classified information and passing it covertly to foreign actors in exchange for substantial sums of money" (he also attended Sherwani's new trial in 2025). In April 2022, he joined the Erbil protests against Turkey's Operation Claw-Lock as a private citizen, citing the parliament's failure to condemn Turkish invasion of the region.

After leaving the Gorran Movement, Saleh founded a new opposition party called the National Stance Movement on 19 March 2024. The party is centered around the fight against corruption. Saleh repeatedly declared his refusal to discuss entering government coalitions with either the Kurdistan Democratic Party (KDP) or the Patriotic Union of Kurdistan (PUK), and his party joined an opposition front led by the Kurdistan Islamic Union following the 2024 Kurdistan Region parliamentary election.

At the time of the 2025 Iraqi parliamentary election, he described the National Stance Movement, with its reliance on social media, as "a party that campaigned through mobile phones, competing with two very large parties". He demanded ministerial portfolios for opposition Kurdish parties in the federal government of Iraq to pursue oil interests as well as those of civil servants and farmers.

In late January 2026, shortly after the ceasefire extension in the Syrian transitional government's offensive against the Democratic Autonomous Administration of North and East Syria (DAANES), Saleh led a delegation of members of the Kurdistan Region Parliament and political party representatives from the Kurdistan Region with a shipment of medical aid to Qamishli in the DAANES. In a speech at the Kurdish Red Crescent headquarters there, he called on the Kurdish community internationally to "set aside our differences and unify our stance", and promised more aid to come.
