= Soran Omar =

Iraqi Kurdish politician

- سۆران عومه‌ر سه‌عید ئەحمەد
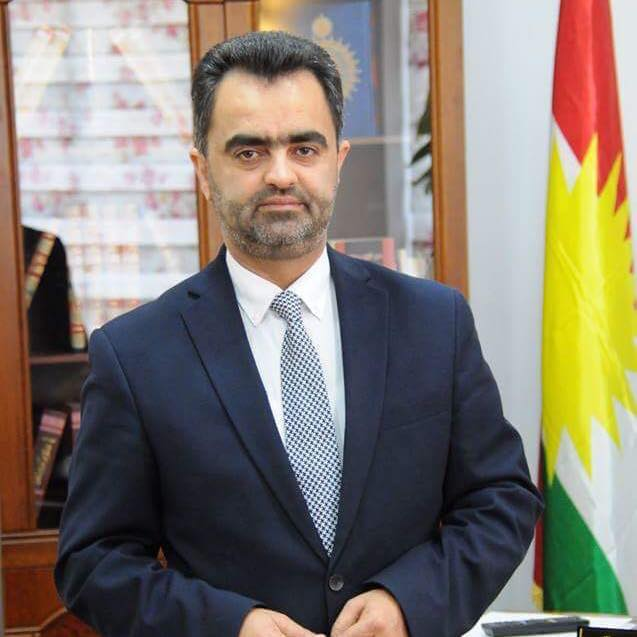
- Soran Omar in 2020

Member of the Council of Representatives of Iraq
- Incumbent
- Assumed office 2020
- Parliamentary group: Kurdistan Justice Group
- Constituency: Kurdistan Region

Member of the Kurdistan Parliament
- In office 2009–2020
- Parliamentary group: Kurdistan Justice Group
- Constituency: Sulaymaniyah Governorate

Soran Omar Saeed Ahmed (Kurdish: سۆران عومه‌ر سه‌عید ئەحمەد, romanised: Soran Umer Seîd Ehmed, born 12 December 1978) is an Iraqi Kurdish politician of the Kurdistan Justice Group. He was born in Qaradagh, Sulaymaniyah Governorate. He currently serves as an MP in the Iraqi Council of Representatives.

He resigned as a member of the Kurdistan Parliament in 2020. Within the same year, parliamentary immunity was removed from him so that legal charges could be brought against him due to his involvement in the Kheli Hama massacre.

== Relations with Mullah Krekar ==
Soran Omar was a communist as a young man, although he would meet Mullah Krekar and later join his Islah wing of the Kurdish mujahideen. He then became the editor of the magazine called Mawa, which Mullah Krekar owned. They cut ties in 2009 over Soran Omar publishing an image which Mullah Krekar warned him not to publish.
