= Najeba Latef Ahmed =

Iraqi politician

Najeba Latef Ahmed (Kurdish: نه‌جیبه‌ له‌تیف ئه‌حمه‌د; born 1 July 1969) is an Iraqi Kurdish politician of the Kurdistan Islamic Group. She was born in Sulaymaniyah.
