= Omar Said Ali =

Iraqi Kurdish politician

- عومەر سەید عەلی

General coordinator of Gorran Movement
- In office July 25, 2017 – September 28, 2024
- Preceded by: Nawshirwan Mustafa
- Succeeded by: Dana Ahmed Majid

Personal details
- Born: 1945 Sulaymaniyah
- Party: Gorran Movement
- Other political affiliations: Patriotic Union of Kurdistan (1979-2009)
- Occupation: Politician

Omar Said Ali (Sorani Kurdish: عومەر سەید عەلی Arabic: عمر سید علي (born 1945) is an Iraqi Kurdish Politician who served as the general coordinator of The Gorran Movement after the passing of founder Nawshirwan Mustafa, he served as general coordinator from July 25, 2017 until September 28, 2024.

== Early life ==
Omar said ali was born in 1945 in Sulaymaniyah

== Career ==
in 1974 Omar Said Ali became a peshmarga and 2 years later in 1976 he was sentenced to jail for 6 years but was released after 3 years.

Omar Said Ali left Kurdistan in 1980 because of an injury after a bombing by iraqi aircraft in mount kewa rash. he later on supervised Patriotic Union of Kurdistan organizations in Europe.

Later on Omar Said Ali was elected as a member of the leadership council and then the political bureau of The Patriotic Union of Kurdistan. and in 1992 he was elected as a member in the Kurdistan Parliament.

Omar Said Ali resigned from The Patriotic Union of Kurdistan in 2009 and became one of the co-founders of The Gorran Movement.

in July 25 2017 Omar Said Ali was elected as The General Coordinator for The Gorran Movement after the passing of Nawshirwan Mustafa and in September 14 2019 he was reelected as the general coordinator of The Gorran Movement in September 28 2024 he stepped down as the general coordinator and handed over duties to Dana Ahmad Majid

== See also ==
- Nawshirwan Mustafa
- Gorran Movement
- Patriotic Union of Kurdistan
- Dana Ahmed Majid
