= National Stance Movement =

Kurdish political party in Iraqi Kurdistan

National Stance Movement: ڕەوتی هەڵوێستی نیشتمانی (Sorani Kurdish); حركة الموقف الوطني (Arabic)
- Leader: Ali Hama Saleh
- Founded: 19 March 2024; 2 years ago
- Split from: Gorran Movement
- Headquarters: Sulaymaniyah, Kurdistan Region
- Ideology: Anti-corruption; Kurdish nationalism; Reformism
- Political position: Centre
- Colors: Purple
- Council of Representatives of Iraq: 5 / 329
- Kurdistan Region Parliament: 4 / 100

The National Stance Movement (Sorani Kurdish: ڕەوتی هەڵوێستی نیشتیمانی, romanized: Rewtî Helwêstî Nîştimanî; Arabic: الموقف, romanized: al-Mawqif, abbreviated as Halwest) is a political party in the Kurdistan Region of Iraq. It was founded on 19 March 2024 with a congress held in Sulaymaniyah. The party includes former members of the Gorran Movement, among them the party leader Ali Hama Saleh, as well as of the National Coalition. The party was also joined by disgruntled teachers who have been protesting the repeated failure by authorities to pay their salaries over the last few years.

At the founding conference, Ali Hama Saleh was elected as leader of the new party. Apart from Saleh, the party's executive committee consists of Bedel Berwarî, Rêbwar Kerîm Mehmûd, Xalib Mihemed, Karwan Hama Saleh, Xanzad Mihemed, Serdar Qadir, Selîm Koyî and Mamosta Fûad. After the conference, Saleh said that the goals of the party are not just to participate in elections and that the attempts to prevent the regional election from taking place could lead the region into a "very dark tunnel".

For the 2024 election, the party submitted a list containing 62 candidates, most of whom are running in Silêmanî Governorate. Draw Media also reported that there was internal conflict at the foundational conference and that prominent founding members like Yûsif Mihemed and Mesûd Ebdulxaliq withdrew.

== Positions and statements ==
On 2 April 2024, the party released a statement supporting the linking of public servants' salaries to the Iraqi salary system, at the expense of the authority of the Government of Kurdistan Region. It explained this position with the failure of the regional authorities to provide these monthly salaries on time and criticized that the ruling parties would have used the salaries as a political card to apply pressure. The party also said that this shift of responsibilities would not weaken the Kurdistan Region but instead that the region has been weakened by corruption, partisanship in institutions like the Peshmerga and the prevention of clean elections.

According to Herş Ebdulrehman, one of the members of the party, the aim is to combat nepotism and corruption in the Kurdistan Region and not to go the same way as the Gorran Movement which he sees as part of the political parties that "suck the blood of this nation". The aim is also to create a united front of dissidents. He claims that the party doesn't want its candidates to use the parliament as a source of livelihood and self-enrichment and says that those who become candidates within the National Stance Movement have their own capital and businesses. He also characterizes those who founded the party as the "voice of the protest against oppression of the ruling parties", who defended themselves against the oppression of freedom of expression, including the assassination of journalists, over the last three decades.

The party's portrayal in Iranian state media and its regular contacts with pro-Iranian figures have been interpreted as signals that "the movement may be functioning as a conduit for Iranian influence aimed at fracturing Kurdish political cohesion". Halwest was also said to manifest "admiration" for Turkey's Justice and Development Party. On 7 December 2025, following the 2025 Iraqi parliamentary election, it joined a united Islamist front with the Kurdistan Islamic Union and the Kurdistan Justice Group at a meeting in Erbil.

== Prominent party members ==
The party leader Ali Hama Saleh was an MP of the Gorran Movement well known for his economic expertise and his criticism of the Kurdistan Region government's policies regarding oil and income. For his concise breakdowns of alleged corrupt deals over land, benefits and oil, also on his own show on the newschannel KNN, he became known as "The Calculator".

Among other former Gorran members who joined the new party are the prominent personalities Serdar Qadir, Xalib Mihemed, Behar Mehmûd and Daban Mihemed.

The National Stance Movement also was joined by Islamist personalities like Selîm Koyî, a former leading figure within the Kurdistan Justice Group, who had argued for a united opposition front between his party and the Gorran Movement in 2018. Koyî is part of the party's executive committee.

Furthermore, prominent formerly independent politicians and activists joined the party. Among them is Bedel Berwarî, a teacher and protest organizer from Duhok, who was arrested in May 2020 without warrant or explanation why he was arrested and where he was taken to by local security forces. Later this month, he was released on bail for protesting without permission, despite having had applied to the local authorities in time. On 21 October 2021, after spending over a year behind bars without conviction, he was found guilty by an Erbil court for breaching a law about inciting violence and planning violent protests. However, as the time he had already spent in pre-trial detention was longer than the actual sentence, he was released that day. Independent observers also noted that the court presented no evidence for Berwarî actually planning a violent protest. Another formerly independent figure in the National Stance Movement is Rêbwar Kerîm Mehmûd, a politician from Silêmanî.

== Election results ==
=== Council of Representatives elections ===
Election	Leader	Votes	%	Seats	+/–	Position	Government
2025	Ali Hama Saleh	156,995	1.40%	5 / 329	New	▲19th	TBA
