= Rabun Maroof =

Iraqi Kurdish politician

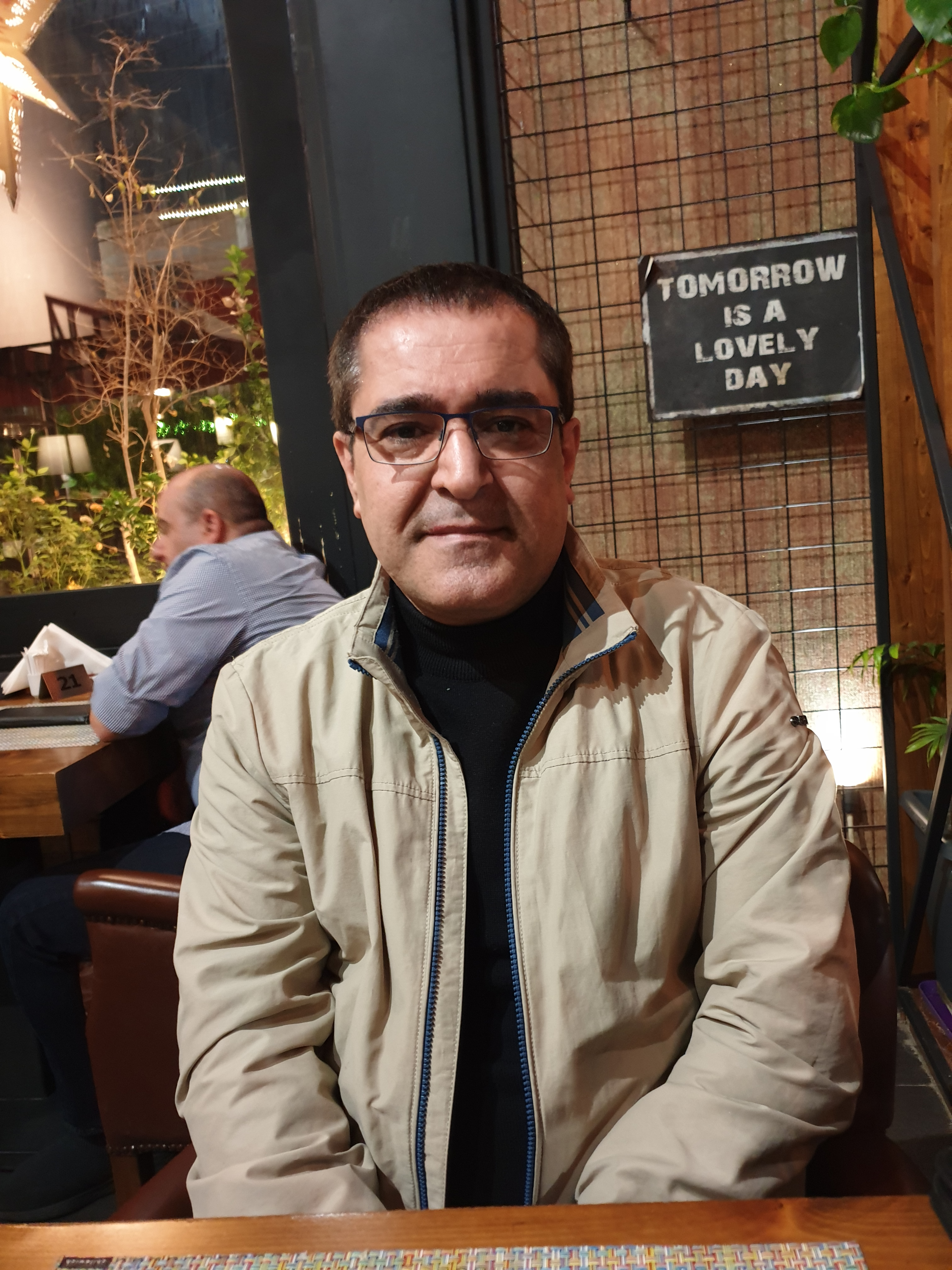
Rabun Maroof

Raboon Tawfiq Maroof Khuder (Kurdish: رابوون مه‌عروف, born 1 July 1976) is an Iraqi Kurdish politician of the New Generation Movement. Maroof was born in Kirkuk, Iraq.
