= Gorran Movement =

Kurdish political party in Iraqi Kurdistan

Gorran Movement بزووتنه‌وەی گۆڕان
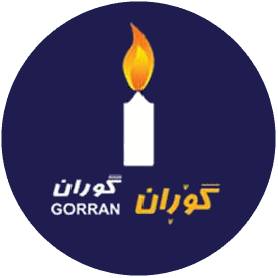
- Leader: Dana Ehmed Mecîd
- Founder: Newşîrwan Mustefa
- Founded: 2009
- Split from: Patriotic Union of Kurdistan
- Headquarters: Zargata Hill, Slemani, Iraqi Kurdistan
- Ideology: Reformism; Kurdish nationalism; Social liberalism; Secularism; Federalism; Regionalism
- Political position: Centre to centre-left
- Colors: Royal Blue
- Council of Representatives of Iraq: 0 / 329
- Kurdistan Region Parliament: 1 / 100

Website
- gorran.net

The Gorran Movement (Kurdish: Bizûtinewey‌ Gorran / بزووتنەوەی گۆڕان, lit. Movement for Change) or just Gorran (Change) is a Kurdish political party in the Kurdistan Region of Iraq. The party is led by Dana Ehmed Mecîd, it was formerly under the leadership of Umer Seyid Elî, and was founded in 2009 by Newşîrwan Mustefa and Qadir Hacî Elî. Gorran is the sixth largest party in the Kurdistan Region, having lost almost all of its voters (95%) since its foundation, and is now no longer represented in the Iraqi parliament.

== Gorran under Nawshirwan Mustafa ==
According to the BBC Gorran had "already shaken the political landscape in Kurdish areas" in March 2010. Support for the Movement for Change "stems from the simple fact that it is the new, dynamic, fresh option in Kurdistan" and its "calls for an end to monopoly control of power." One of Gorran's main objectives is to "uproot rampant corruption." The party is particularly popular with the youth of Kurdistan and campaigns against patronage. It consists of a mix of (former) PUK/KDP members, Pêşmerge, and academics. Gorran supporters have often faced "violent intimidation." Gorran have stated in The Economist that "the KDP and PUK have done a poor job of promoting the Kurds’ interests at the federal parliament in Baghdad." The party in the 2009 and 2010 elections "won in the city and the province of Sulaimaniyah."

=== 2009 Kurdistan Region parliamentary election and 2010 Iraqi parliamentary election ===
The Change List won a total of 25 seats in the July 2009 elections, making it the second-most successful list in the election after the Kurdistani List. The party viewed the election results as a huge victory. The movement's platform for the 2009 election was to de-politicise the regional government, strengthen the judiciary, limit political interference in the economy and make the budget more transparent. Supporting federalism for Iraq, it said disputes with the central government could be solved through dialogue based on the Iraqi Constitution. Considered to be the main opposition to Kurdistan List, particularly in areas dominated by the Patriotic Union of Kurdistan. The campaign focused on addressing what it sees as corruption undertaken by the Kurdistan Democratic Party and Patriotic Union of Kurdistan. It managed to win eight seats.

=== 2013 Kurdistan Region parliamentary election and 2014 Iraqi parliamentary election ===
Gorran won 24 seats in the 2013 Kurdistan Region parliamentary election and 9 seats in the 2014 Iraqi parliamentary election.

=== 2011 Kurdish protests in Iraq ===
In 2011 the party called for the resignation of the Cabinet and the disbanding of the Kurdistan Regional Government during the protests in Kurdistan that followed the 2011 Egyptian protests. This was accompanied by protests against the Kurdistan Regional Government and the Kurdistan Democratic Party. Some have criticized the party for causing unnecessary unrest, arguing that there is no need for the Kurdish government to step down. Amnesty International and the Human Rights Watch have urged protests to be allowed. February 17, 2011, Human Rights Watch reported security guards firing on protesters in Sulaymaniyah, killing at least one person and wounding more than 33 others after the crowd threw rocks at the political headquarters of the KDP. Since there were shootings which led to deaths, Amnesty International and Human Rights Watch called for an independent investigation into the killings.

== Gorran under Umer Seyid Elî ==
Following death of the party leader, Newşîrwan Mustefa, in May 2017, an internal ballot was held to elect a new leader, Umer Seyid Elî, and six other executive assembly members.

=== 2018 Kurdistan Region parliamentary election and 2018 Iraqi parliamentary election ===
Under the leadership of Umer Seyid Elî, Gorran failed to present a lasting challenge to the KDP-PUK duopoly and the movement's popularity has been declining. As a result, Gorran suffered a harsh blow winning only 12 seats in the 2018 Kurdistan parliamentary election and only 5 seats in the 2018 Iraqi parliamentary election. The total number of votes for Gorran has shrunk by 60 percent since previous elections and Gorran has lost a significant number of followers and prominent members. Gorran officials are also concerned to an extent about the future of the party, saying it “faces a deadly failure” and has been dogged with infighting. Gorran leadership was criticised for their handling of the referendum, as they had initially opposed the timing of the referendum but eventually supported holding it in September 2017 amid intense political pressure. New Generation, a movement founded by Şaswar Abdulwahîd, has taken in Gorran defectors, New Generation has been described as stepping forward as Gorran has fallen back.

The biggest crisis facing Gorran and the source of many of its recent failings and resulting loss of popularity is the ongoing dispute over the parties assets worth hundreds of millions of dollars and include shares in several ongoing projects, including Gasin cement company and metro supermarket as well as 305,000 square meters of land property including the Gorran party headquarters which were secretly seized by Newşîrwan Mustefa's two sons after his death during the funeral while party supporters were in mourning. The brothers’ ownership of the property is seen by many in a negative light and drew allegations of hypocrisy and nepotism, one of the things Gorran was established against. The decision caused a public and political backlash when it was exposed in the independent newspaper Awêne, and a growing number of middle- and high-ranking officials as well as grass-roots supporters are adding their voices to the uproar within the party. Merîwan Kani, a former supporter of the party, has said their claims have damaged the principles of the party and this issue could lead to a disaster which will bring Gorran to its political end.

As a result of Gorran's political direction and subsequent failings after the death of Newşîrwan Mustefa, the party is now split between two main rival factions. The first faction is responsible for all decisions post-19 May 2017 and is seen as wanting to turn Gorran into a family-based party led by Umer Seyid Elî, Mustefa Seyid Qadir, Mehemed Tewfîq Rehîm and Newşîrwan's two sons. The second faction rejects Gorran becoming a family-based party and is led by Usman Hacî Mehmûd, Qadir Hacî Elî, Aram Ehmed, Dr. Yûsif Mehemed, Elî Heme Salih and Abdulay Mela Nûrî.

Corruption of Çiya Newşîrwan and Nima Newşîrwan within Gorran have been exposed in the media, prominent members have called for their expulsion from the party by Umer Seyid Elî "for the sake of Gorran’s interest and staying on the right path", the dirty deals have been facilitated by members of the KRG cabinet, one such corrupt deal has been identified concerns two valuable pieces of land belonging to the government which are 75,000 m2 and 125,000 m2 in size. Kemal Salim Gorran's Minister of Trade and Industry in the KRG cabinet has signed the deals for Çiya and Nima who are accused of betraying and selling out their father Newşîrwan Mustefa. In another example of Çiya Newşîrwan and Nima Newşîrwan's ongoing corruption scandals, their links with Silêmanî Provincial Council member Muhemed Şeyx Wehab has been exposed, Wehab under Article 289 of the Iraqi Penal Code, which criminalizes falsifying official documents is facing charges of falsifying customs bills worth $10 million in which Nima and Çiya are implicated. Çiya Newşîrwan was born in Iran and holds a bachelor's degree in economics and master's degree in Politics and International Relations both from Harvard University.

== Gorran under Dana Ehmed Mecîd ==
Dana Ehmed Mecîe became the new leader and General Coordinator of Gorran on the 18th of September 2024 according to Independent High Electoral Commission. In a peaceful transition of power Umer Seyid Elî handed over the Gorran flag to Dana Ehmed Mecîd in a ceremony. His first act as party leader was to officially remove the Gorran head quarters out of the Zargata hill, the location of HQ has been a major source of problems in past years over continued disputed ownership of the hill. Dana Ehmed Mecîd is only the third person to hold the Gorran leadership position.

== Gorran 2021 Iraqi parliamentary election ==
Gorran suffered a humiliating defeat of not winning a single seat in the 2021 Iraqi parliamentary elections, the movement and the disastrous election campaign was led by Umer Seyid Elî and the two sons of founder Newşîrwan Mustefa. On 13 October 2021 leadership decided to step down. Political observers have said the election result was a fatal blow for Gorran “Gorran was born in 2009 but died in 2021”. The scale of Gorran's demise is represented by a 95% percent decrease in votes and it is now the sixth largest political party in the Kurdistan Region. Those identified with Gorran's collapse by the public are Umer Seyid Elî, Çiya and Nima Newşîrwan, Mustefa Seyd Qadir, Celal Cewher and Heval Ebû Bekir. Former Gorran supporters have held protests against Umer Seyid Elî and Çiya Nawşîrwan demanding they leave Gorran Headquarters and return the property held by them. It is rumoured that Usman Hacî Mehmûd and Dr. Yûsif Mehemed will jointly take over Gorran. Historian David McDowall states "In the end Gorran changed nothing".

== 2024 member exits to new parties ==
After having left Gorran, former MP Elî Heme Salih founded a new opposition party by the name of National Stance Movement on 19 March 2024. The party is centered around the combat against corruption. Among the founders of the party were other prominent former Gorran members like Serdar Qadir, Ğalib Mehemed, Behar Mehmûd and Daban Mehemed.

Another former Gorran MP, Ednan Usman, joined Lahur Şeyx Cengî's People's Front and was elected to be a candidate on the party's list in the 2024 Kurdistan Region parliamentary election.

== Gorran party structure ==
=== Executive Assembly ===
- Dana Ehmed Mecîd, general coordinator of Gorran.
- Vacant, coordinator of internal chambers.
- Vacant, coordinator of national assembly.
- Vacant, coordinator of public assembly.
- Vacant, coordinator of Parliament factions.
- Vacant, coordinator of regional representatives.
- Vacant, coordinator of public relations.

=== National Assembly ===
The national assembly's (Jivat) role is policy. It consists of leaders of Gorran blocs in Iraqi and Kurdish parliaments, coordinators of Gorran departments, district officials and representatives who were successful in Gorran's internal elections.

=== General Assembly ===
The general assembly's (Jivat) role is advisory. It consists of former Gorran leaders who have held office and are now retired.

Notable Members

- Vice President Mustefa Sayid Qadir
- MP Dr. Ğalib Mehemed
- MP Kawe Mehemed
- MP Yûsif Mehemed Sadiq

== Electoral results ==
=== Iraqi Parliament ===
Election	Votes	%	Seats	+/–	Position	Government
2010	476,478	4.13%	8 / 325	New	5th	Opposition
2014	451,858	3.47%	9 / 328	▲1	▼9th	Opposition
2018	201,684	1.94%	5 / 329	▼4	▼10th	Support
