= Prime Minister of Iraq =

Head of government

Prime Minister of the Republic of Iraq
- رئيس وزراء جمهورية العراق (Arabic)
- Coat of arms of Iraq

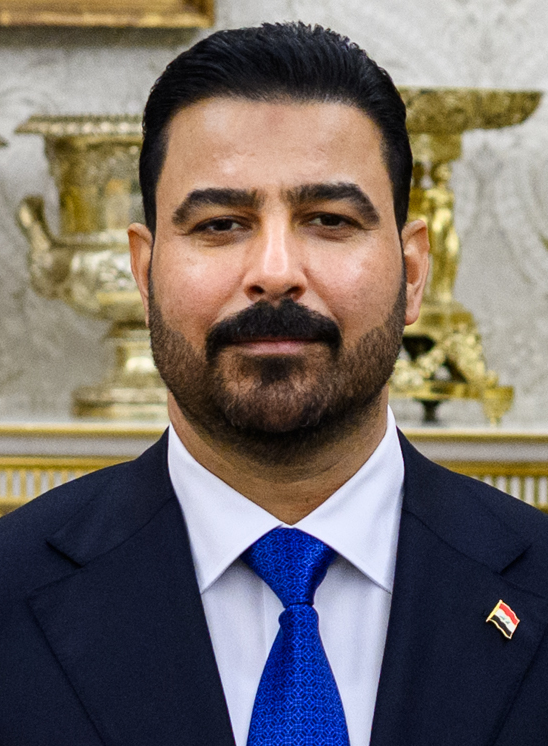
- Incumbent; Ali al-Zaidi since 14 May 2026
- Council of Ministers; Executive branch of the Federal Government of the Republic of Iraq
- Style: His Excellency
- Type: Head of government
- Residence: Republican Palace, Baghdad
- Seat: Al Zaqura Building
- Appointer: President
- Term length: Four-year term, renewable
- Formation: 11 November 1920
- First holder: Abd Al-Rahman Al-Gillani
- Salary: 140,000,000 Iraqi dinars/96,552 USD annually
- Website: Official website

The prime minister of the Republic of Iraq is the foremost executive of the Iraqi government and the commander-in-chief of the Iraqi Armed Forces. The premier is responsible for the general policy of the state and directs the Council of Ministers, with the power to dismiss and name any senior executive, including ministers and generals. In addition to the MoD armed forces, the premier is the chairman of the National Security Council and has direct authority over all of those intelligence and security agencies under the jurisdiction of the Office of the Commander in Chief, such as the CTS and the INIS.

Under the informally adopted ethno-sectarian quota system known as Muhasasa, the position of prime minister is reserved for a Shia Muslim.

On 14 May 2026, Ali al-Zaidi became the prime minister.

== History ==
The prime minister was originally an appointed office, subsidiary to the head of state, and the nominal leader of the Iraqi parliament. Under the 2005 constitution the prime minister is the country's active executive authority. Nouri al-Maliki (formerly Jawad al-Maliki) was selected to be prime minister on 21 April 2006. On 14 August 2014, al-Maliki agreed to step down as prime minister of Iraq to allow Haider al-Abadi to take his place. On 25 October 2018, Adil Abdul-Mahdi was sworn into office five months after the 2018 elections until his resignation in 2019. He was once again appointed, this time as a caretaker prime minister due to political dispute. Abdul-Mahdi was replaced by Mustafa Al-Kadhimi, who was approved by the parliament on 7 May 2020. Al-Kadhimi was replaced by Al-Sudani after the 2021 Iraqi parliamentary election.

== Appointment ==
After an election, the Council of Representatives elects the Presidency Council of Iraq, including the president of the Council of Ministers. The Presidency Council must then name a prime minister unanimously within two weeks. If it fails to do so, then the responsibility of naming the prime minister reverts to the Council of Representatives. In that event, the Council of Representatives must confirm the nomination by an absolute majority. If the prime minister is unable to nominate his Council of Ministers within one month, the Presidency Council must name another prime minister.

== Agencies directly subordinate ==
The Counter Terrorism Bureau, National Intelligence Service, National Security Service, and Popular Mobilization Commission report to the prime minister directly. The CTB oversees the Counter Terrorism Command, a formation that includes all Iraqi Special Operations Forces. In June 2009, there were ongoing efforts to make the Iraqi CTB a separate ministry.

== Seat ==
The prime minister's office is located in the Al Zaqura Building in the Green Zone, Baghdad.

== See also ==
- List of kings of Iraq
- List of presidents of Iraq
