= Republican Palace =

Republican Palace or Presidential palace is the official residence of the Head of the State. Republican Palace can be

- Republican Palace (Iraq)
- Republican Palace (Sudan)
