= Baghdad Clock =

Coordinates: 33.3026°N 44.3750°E

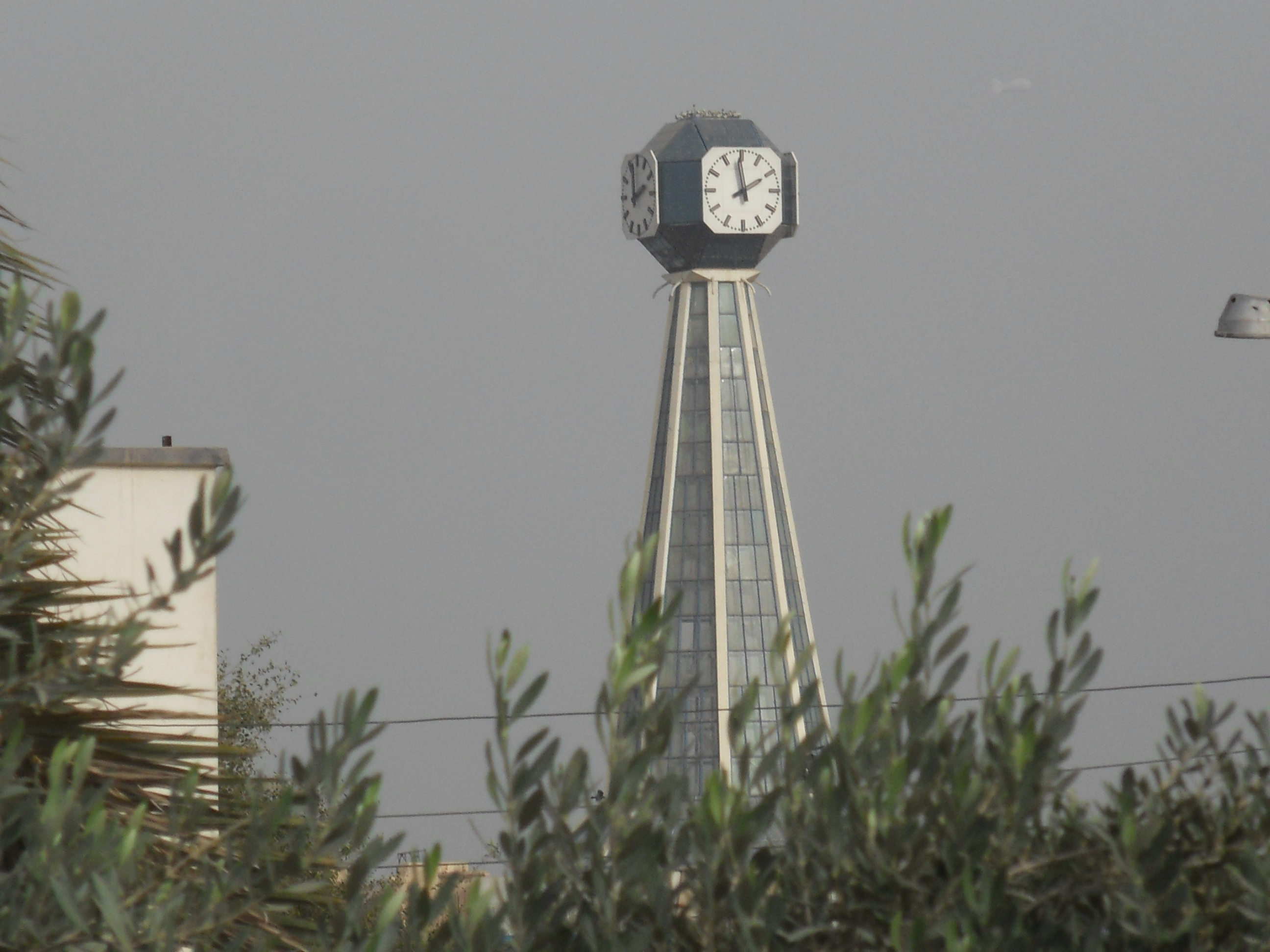
- Baghdad Clock (2010)
- Interactive map of the Baghdad Clock area

General information
- Status: Reconstructed
- Type: Public Building
- Location: Green Zone, Baghdad, Iraq

The Baghdad Clock is a public building located in the Green Zone, in Baghdad, Iraq. Prior to 2003 the building was employed as a museum and featured a large clock tower. However, the building was heavily damaged during the 2003 invasion of Iraq. It was reconstructed later and is now the seat of the Supreme Court of Iraq.

The building's museum has seven halls where gifts given to former Iraqi President Saddam Hussein are displayed.
