= Al Zaqura Building =

Iraqi government building

Coordinates: 33°18′55″N 44°24′06″E

Al-Zaqura Palace
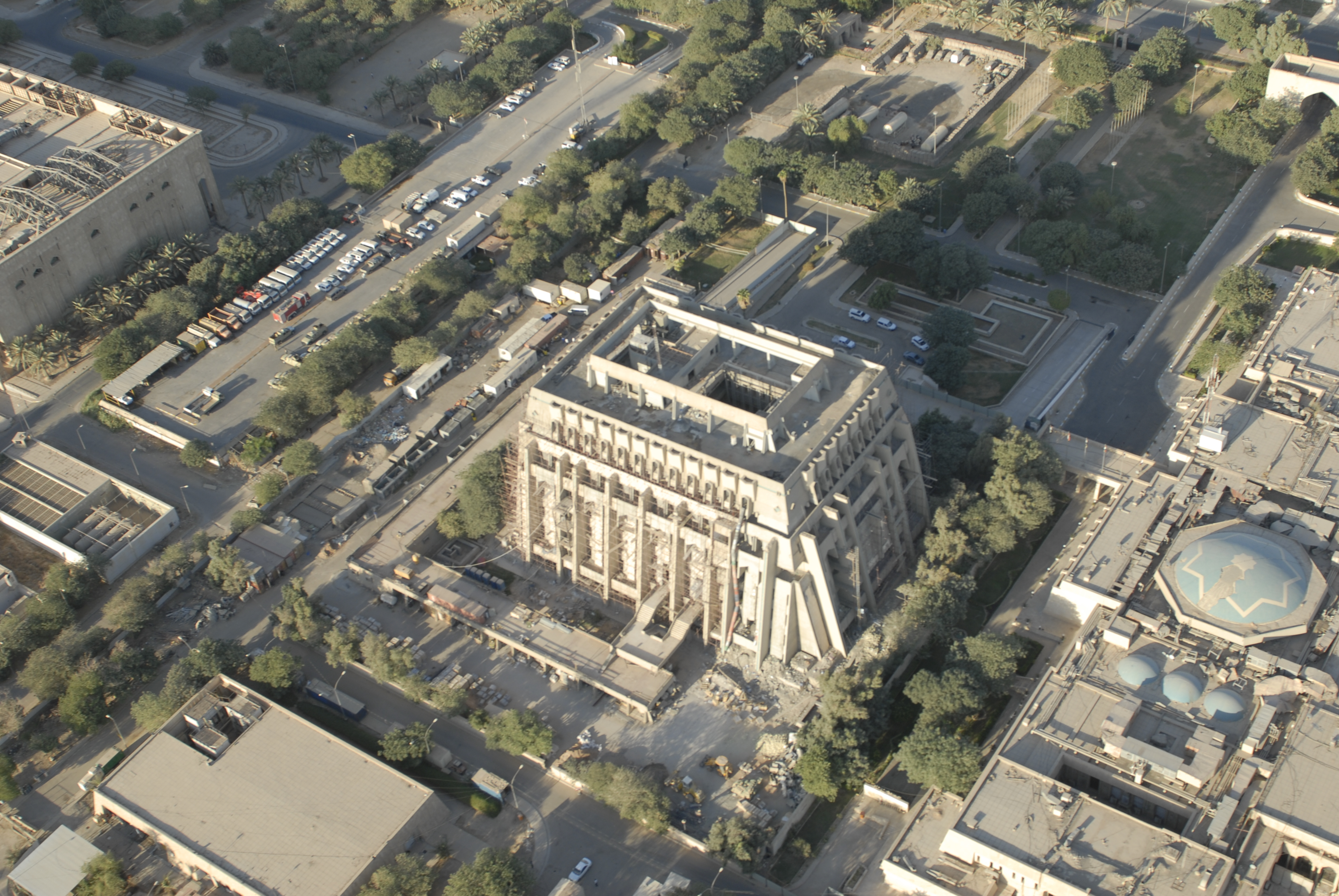
- Al Zaqura Building in Baghdad (2011)
- Interactive map of the Al-Zaqura Palace area

General information
- Architectural style: Brutalist architecture
- Location: Green Zone, Baghdad, Iraq
- Year built: 1975
- Renovated: 2003 (renovated by Harlow International)
- Owner: Government of Iraq

Technical details
- Material: Concrete (Brutalist style)

Design and construction
- Architects: Saeed Ali Madhlum, CP Kukreja Associates

Al-Zaqura Palace (Arabic: قصر الزقورة) is an Iraqi government building situated in the Green Zone in the capital Baghdad. Maintained by the office of the Prime Minister of Iraq, it is occupied by the office of the prime minister.

== History ==
The building was commissioned under the presidency of Ahmed Hassan al-Bakr. It was built in 1975 by Saeed Ali Madhlum and CP Kukreja Associates as the building for the Council of Ministers, or cabinet.

The building's exterior is in the Brutalist architecture style, the exterior reminiscing an ancient Ziggurat (in Arabic: Al Zaqura). Brutalist style uses one material on the exterior, which is concrete, and is massive in appearance. Although the exterior was inspired by ancient Mesopotamia and a mix of Islamic elements, the inside is decorated in the style of Islamic architecture.

The building was targeted during the Iraq War by Coalition forces in aerial bombardment and sustained heavy damage in 2003, which external damage shows in a photograph taken in 2003. It was renovated by the Iraqi conglomerate Harlow International.
