= Red Zone (Iraq) =

Term used during the Iraq War

- Term/Designation
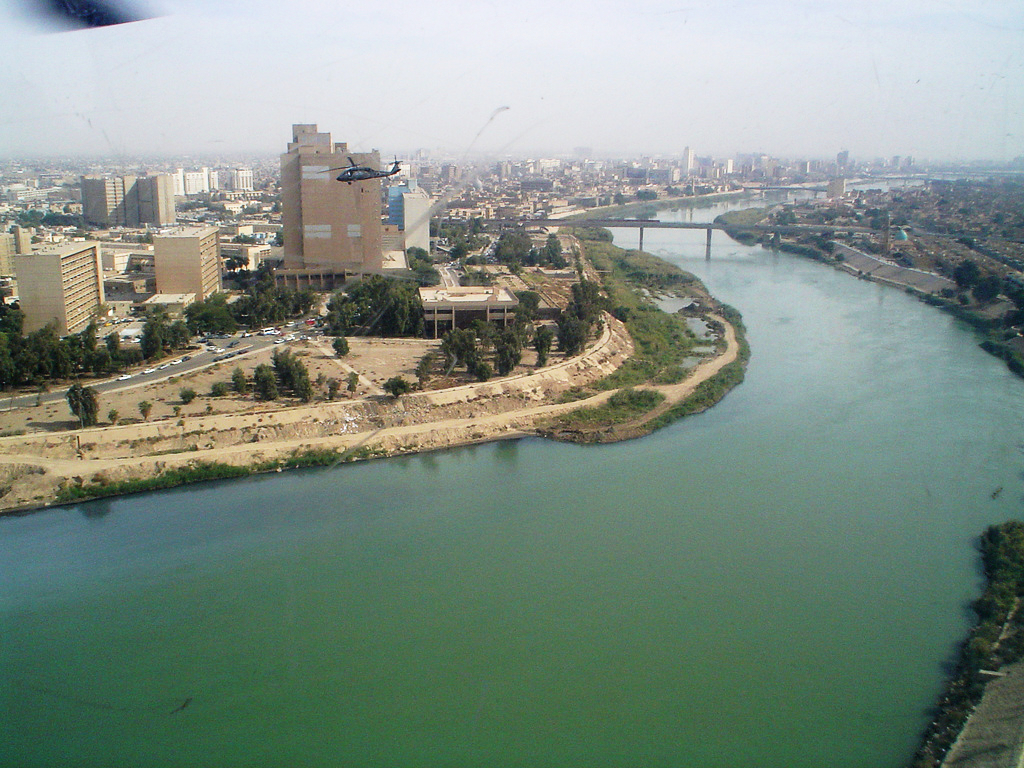
- Partial view of the Red Zone taken from the Baghdad Corniche hotel, across the Tigris River, 2010

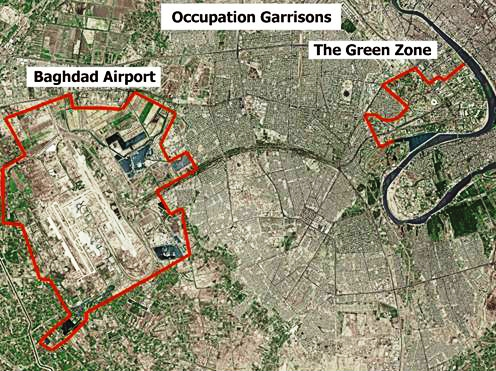
- Map showing the Baghdad Airport and the Green Zone outlined red. The other areas of Baghdad were considered to be within the Red Zone.
- First designated: after Occupation of Iraq (2003)
- Named for: Areas outside of Green Zone, Baghdad Proper in Iraq

“Red Zone” was a term used during the occupation of Iraq to designate the unsafe areas of Baghdad, namely all parts of the city outside the Green Zone. It came into use following the 2003 invasion and subsequent occupation by the United States, the United Kingdom, and allied forces (MNF-I). This area was generally off-limits to most U.S. citizens, as well as to U.S. military personnel, due to security concerns.

== Terminology ==
The name "Red Zone" originated from the military designation used to describe an unsecured area, which in the case of Baghdad was every other area other than the Green Zone (also known as the International Zone), which is a high-security area in Baghdad. Foreign residents of Baghdad, as of 4 October 2015, still sometimes refer to it as such.

== Works about the Red Zone ==
U.S. journalist Steven Vincent, who was murdered in Basra in August 2005, published a book titled In the Red Zone: A Journey into the Soul of Iraq (2004), based on his blog by the same title.

Oliver Poole, a British journalist and author, published the book Red zone: Five Bloody Years in Baghdad in January 2008.

In October 2011, My war in Iraq: Red Zone Baghdad was published by Marcus Fielding.

== See also ==
- Green Zone
- Battle of Haifa Street

External videos
- A video about the Green and Red Zones
- "Inside Iraq's Green Zone", Discussion – Woodrow Wilson International Center for Scholars
