= Green Zone Cafe =

Former Western-based Cafe in Baghdad, Iraq

Green Zone Café
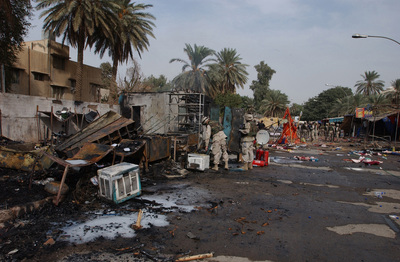
- U.S. soldiers examining the debris of the Green Zone Café after its destruction

General information
- Destroyed: 2004-10-14

The Green Zone Café was a restaurant in the northeast corner of the Green Zone (International Zone) in Baghdad, Iraq. The restaurant was housed in a fabric and metal-frame building established in the parking lot of a former filling station. It was a popular and successful business, primarily serving the Western inhabitants of the Green Zone and featuring Arab cuisine. It also offered alcohol and hookahs.

On October 14, 2004, the restaurant was destroyed, one patron was killed, and five wounded by a backpack bomb. The restaurant reopened briefly a year later, along with a liquor store that was primarily patronized by security contractors in October 2005, but was closed when the Iraqi government confiscated the property.
