= Green Zone =

Area in Baghdad, Iraq

Karradat Mariam كرادة مريم
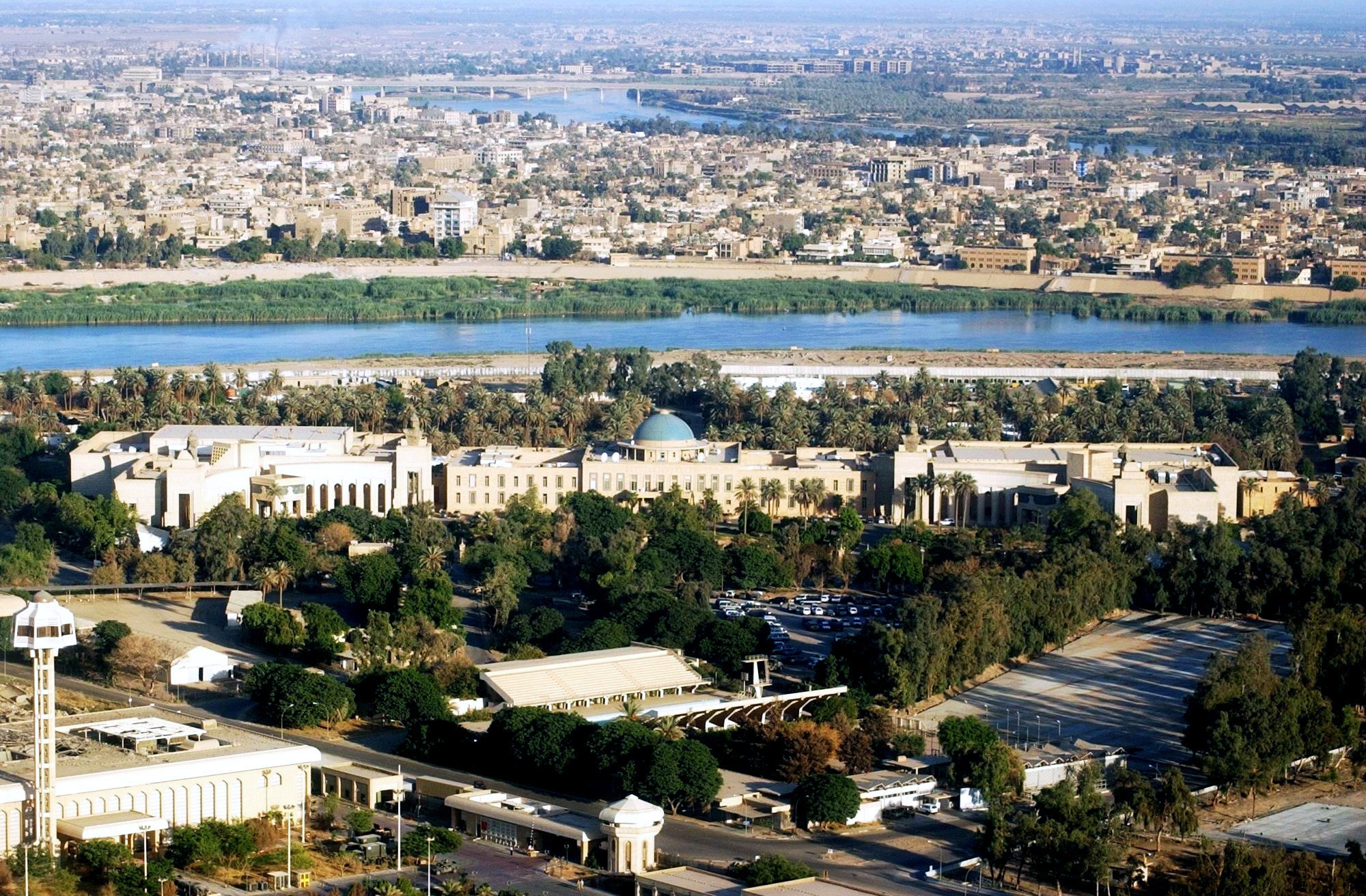
- View of Karradat Mariam in Baghdad in 2005
- Nickname: The Green Zone
- Interactive map of Karradat Mariam
- Coordinates: 33.307577°N 44.390259°E
- Country: Iraq
- City: Baghdad
- District: Karkh
- Seat of Government: Iraqi Government

The Baghdad International Zone (or colloquially the Green Zone) (Arabic: المنطقة الخضراء, romanized: al-minṭaqah al-ḫaḍrā), formally Karradat Mariam (Arabic: كرادة مريم), is a 10-square-kilometer (3.9 sq mi) area in the Karkh district of central Baghdad, Iraq. It is the seat of the government of Iraq, home to government offices, ministries, state institutions, diplomatic missions, and palaces.

== History ==
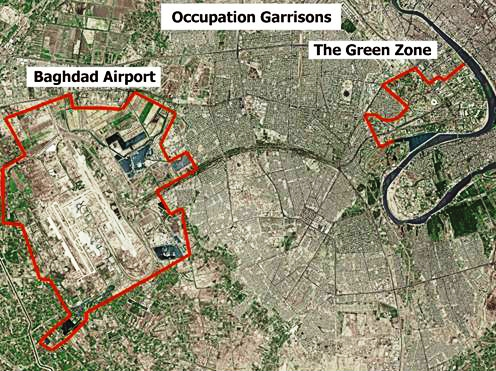
Aerial view and map of the Green Zone

The International Zone was a heavily fortified zone in the center of the Iraqi capital that served as the headquarters of successive Iraqi regimes. It was the administrative center for the Ba'ath Party. The area was not originally home to the villas of government officials, though it was the location of a number of military bases, government ministries, and presidential palaces inhabited by Saddam Hussein and his family. The largest of these was the Republican Palace that was President Saddam Hussein's primary seat of power. The area is also known as Karradat Mariam.

The area was taken by US military forces in April 2003 in some of the heaviest fighting during the capture of Baghdad. In the lead-up to the US invasion of Iraq, Saddam and many high status residents of the area were evacuated because of the anticipated aerial bombardment of the area by US forces. Most of the remaining residents fled as US ground forces closed in on the Iraqi capital out of a fear of arrest by Coalition forces or possible reprisals by disgruntled Iraqis. Some of the original inhabitants who did not flee continued to live in the area but many are also undocumented squatters referred to as the "215 Apartments". Coalition airstrikes at the outset of the fighting left a sizable number of buildings in central Baghdad abandoned. The Coalition Provisional Authority administrators who arrived on the heels of the forward invading forces decided they were ideal for use by Coalition administrators. Jay Garner, head of the reconstruction team, set up his headquarters in the former Republican Palace; other villas were taken by groups of government officials and private contractors. Eventually some five thousand officials and civil contractors settled in the area. The abandoned buildings were not only attractive to Coalition forces, but also to homeless Iraqis. Among these were individuals who had lost their homes in the conflict, but most were urban poor who had been homeless or lived in slums before the war and saw moving into the abandoned houses as a sizable increase in their standard of living. They felt that since they were not Ba'athist, they had as much right to the vacated houses as the Coalition authorities. As of 2009, there continued to be some five thousand of these Iraqis living in the International Zone. The area came to be known as the Green Zone during the occupation to refer to an area under the full control of the Coalition Forces, in contrast to the Red Zone. The Green Zone was the governmental headquarters of the Coalition Provisional Authority that oversaw the public administration of the country from April 2003 until June 2004, when it was succeeded by the Iraqi Interim Government. The latter facilitated the first elections held after the US-led invasion, in 2005. Entry to the Green Zone was under the control of a small garrison of American troops who manned the various checkpoints. They were typically a battalion of soldiers at FOB Prosperity, under the command of the Multi-National Division – Baghdad. Additionally, a battalion of coalition soldiers from the Republic of Georgia also manned the entry checkpoints. The Green Zone was completely surrounded by high concrete blast walls, T-Walls and barbed wire fences with access only available through a handful of entry control points, all controlled by Coalition troops. It is this security that made the Green Zone the safest area of Baghdad, and gave its name colloquially as "the bubble". The southern and eastern side of the zone is protected by the Tigris River – the only entrance to the zone from this side is the Arbataash Tamuz (July 14) Bridge (named for the date that the former regime came to power). The Green Zone was frequently shelled by insurgents with mortars and rockets, though these attacks caused few casualties. In October 2004 it was hit by two suicide bombings, which destroyed the bazaar and the Green Zone Cafe. On April 12, 2007, a bomb went off in the Iraqi Parliament cafeteria, killing Mohammed Awad (a member of the Sunni National Dialogue Front) and injuring 22, including one of the vice presidents. The Green Zone was shelled with rocket and mortar fire almost daily from March 23, 2008, until May 5, 2008, causing numerous civilian and military casualties; as stated in a USA Today article, a high percentage of the rocket and mortar fire originated in Sadr City. On April 6, 2008, two U.S. soldiers were killed and 17 more wounded when a rocket or mortar attack struck inside the Green Zone. On July 22, 2010, three Triple Canopy security guard contractors (two Ugandans and one Peruvian) were killed and 15 more wounded (including two U.S. nationals) when a rocket attack struck inside the International Zone.

Since the handover of sovereignty to Iraqis, many of the facilities in the Green Zone have been turned over to the new Iraqi government. A number of embassies are located there. The largest embassy in the world, namely, the U.S. embassy is located in the southern part of the International or "Green" Zone overlooking the Tigris River. On 1 January 2009, full control of the International Zone (formerly "Green Zone") was handed over to Iraqi security forces, though the Zone remained off-limits to the public. This changed on 4 October 2015, when it was opened to the public with certain restrictions, and again on 10 December 2018, when parts of the Green Zone were opened to the public without restrictions for the first time in over 15 years.

On 8 January 2020, following the assassination of Qasem Soleimani and Abu Mahdi Al-Muhandis, two Katyusha rockets struck within the Green Zone.

=== 2026 Anti-corruption Operation ===
In a dawn raid on the 28th of June, Iraqi security forces closed off the Green Zone to conduct an anti-corruption operation, resulting in 47 arrests.

== Notable sites ==
=== Palaces ===
- Republican Palace
- Baghdad Palace
- Zaqura Palace

=== Public administration ===
- Council of Representatives
- Council of Ministers (The General Secretariat)
- Supreme Judicial Council
- Federal Supreme Court
- National Security Council
- CTS headquarters
- Independent High Electoral Commission main office
- Commission of Integrity
- Unfinished addition to Ba'ath Party Headquarters (Location of trial of Saddam Hussein) – pictured in gallery, below

=== Embassies ===
- U.S Embassy (largest embassy in the world)

=== Gates ===
- Assassins' Gate
- Al Quds Gate (or Jerusalem Gate)

=== Hotels and resorts ===
- Royal Tulip Al Rasheed Hotel
- Rixos Baghdad (under construction)
- Mövenpick Baghdad

=== Landmarks and squares ===
- Unknown Soldier
- Victory Arch
- Grand Festivities Square
- Baghdad Clock

== Gallery ==
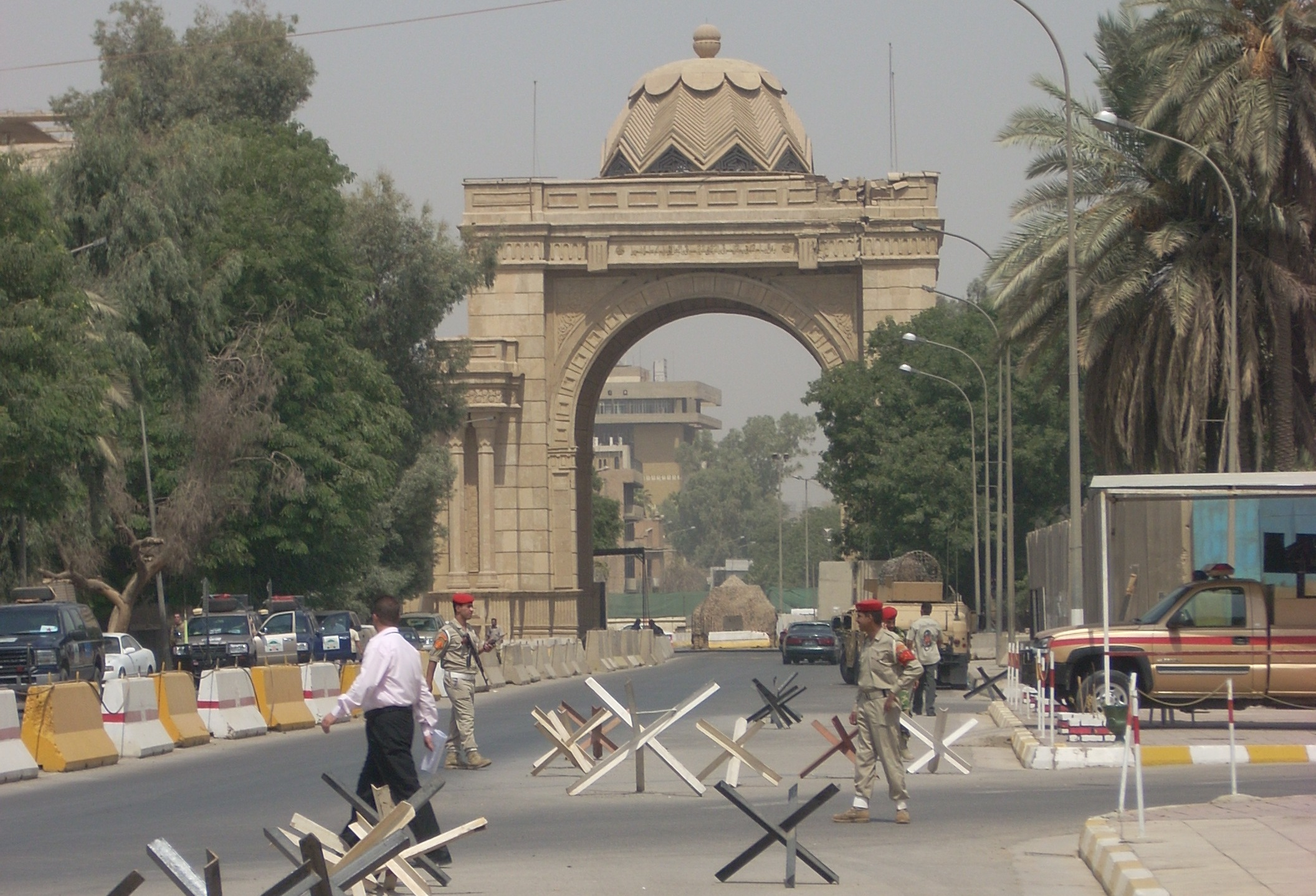
Assassins' Gate

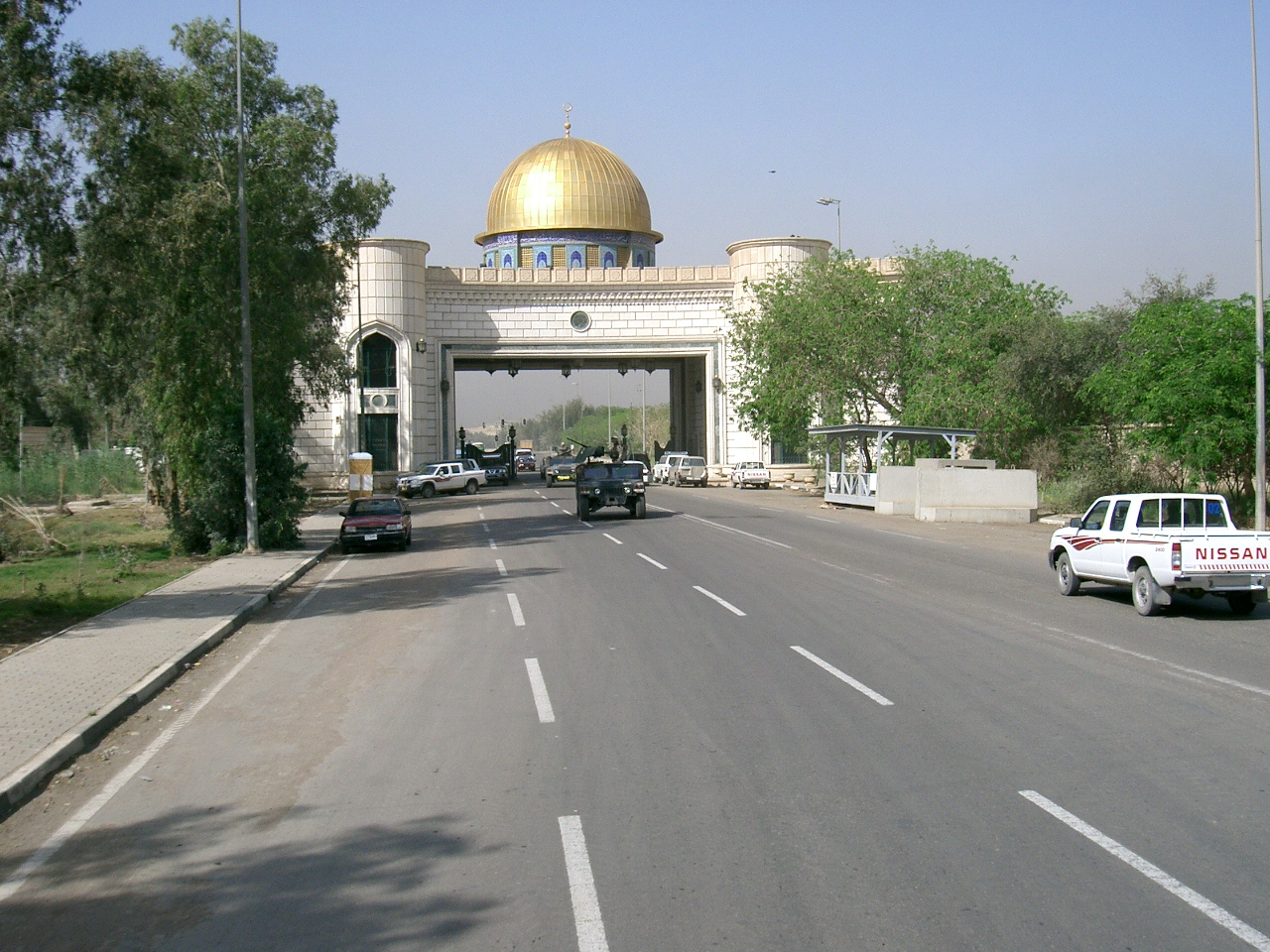
Al Quds Gate

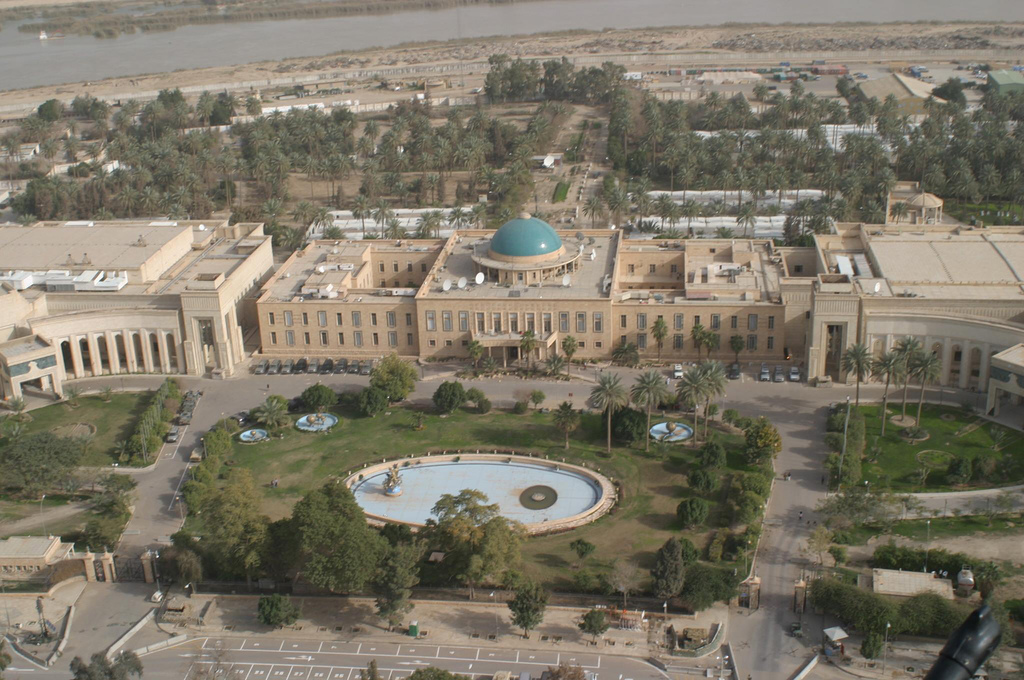
Republican Palace

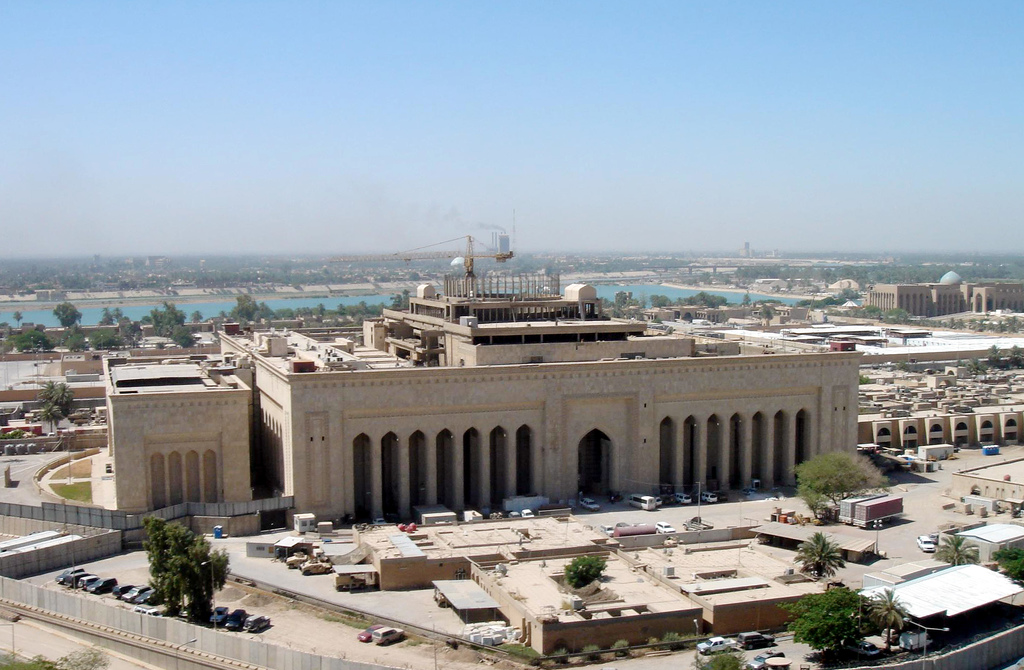
Unfinished addition to Ba'ath Party Headquarters (location of the trial of Saddam Hussein)

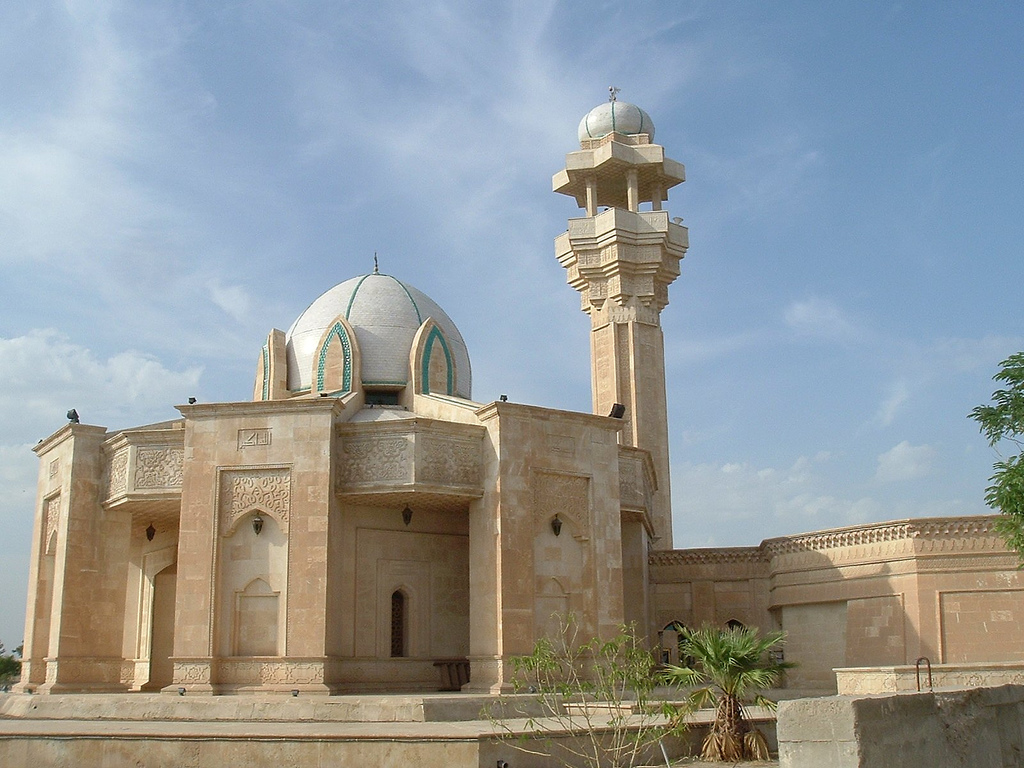
Mosque inside Green Zone

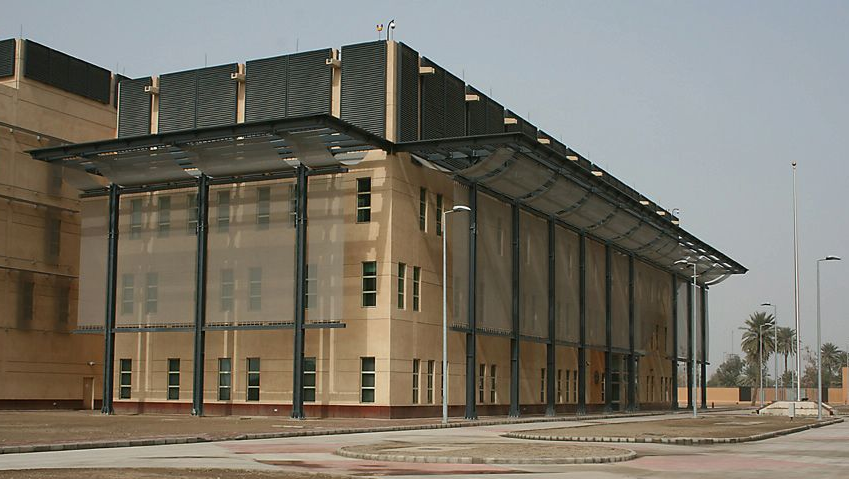
U.S. Embassy

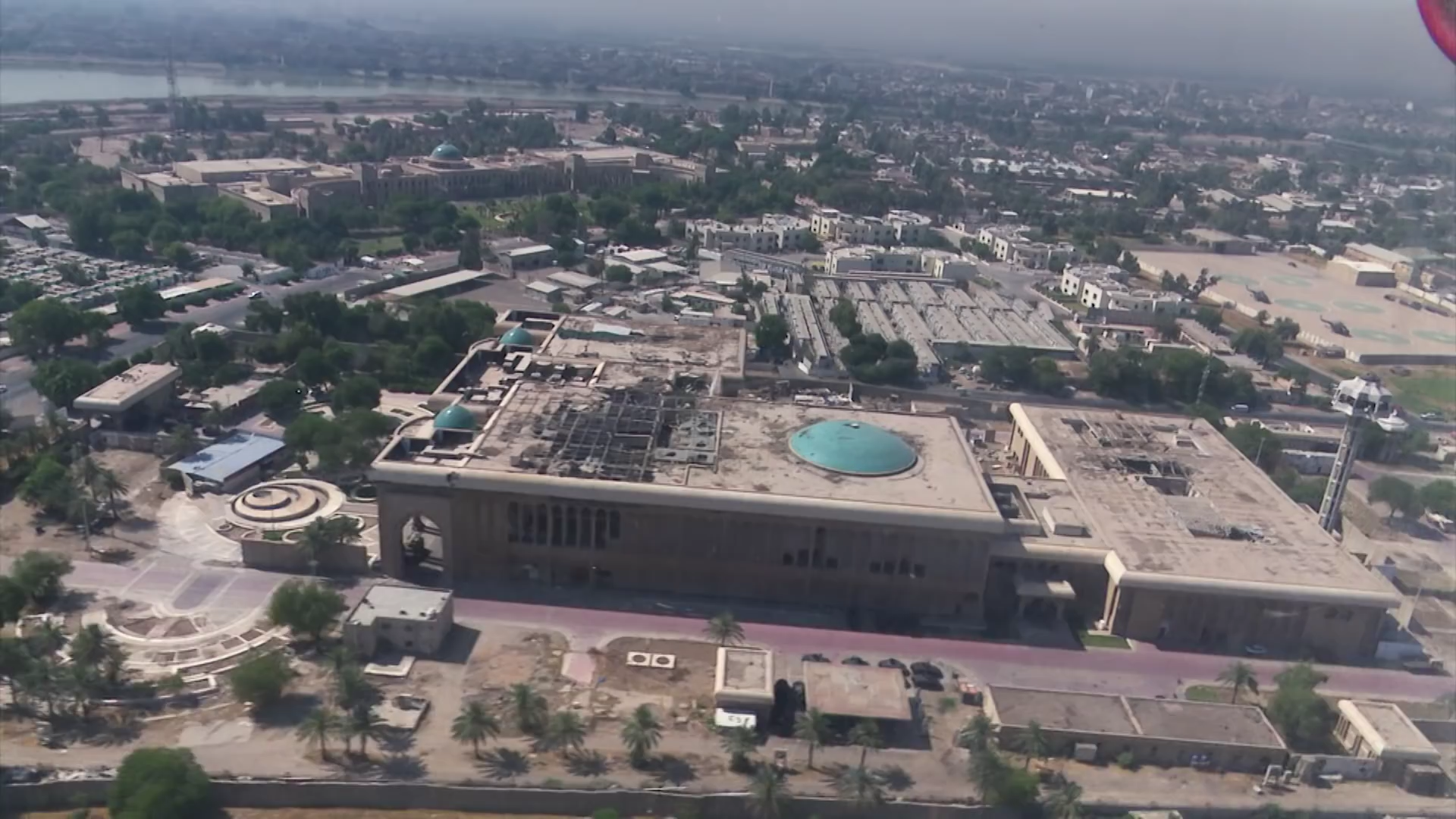
The damaged former Arab Socialist Ba'ath Party Headquarters, 2020
