= Republican Palace, Baghdad =

Residence of the prime minister of Iraq

Coordinates: 33°18′15″N 44°24′31″E

Republican Palace
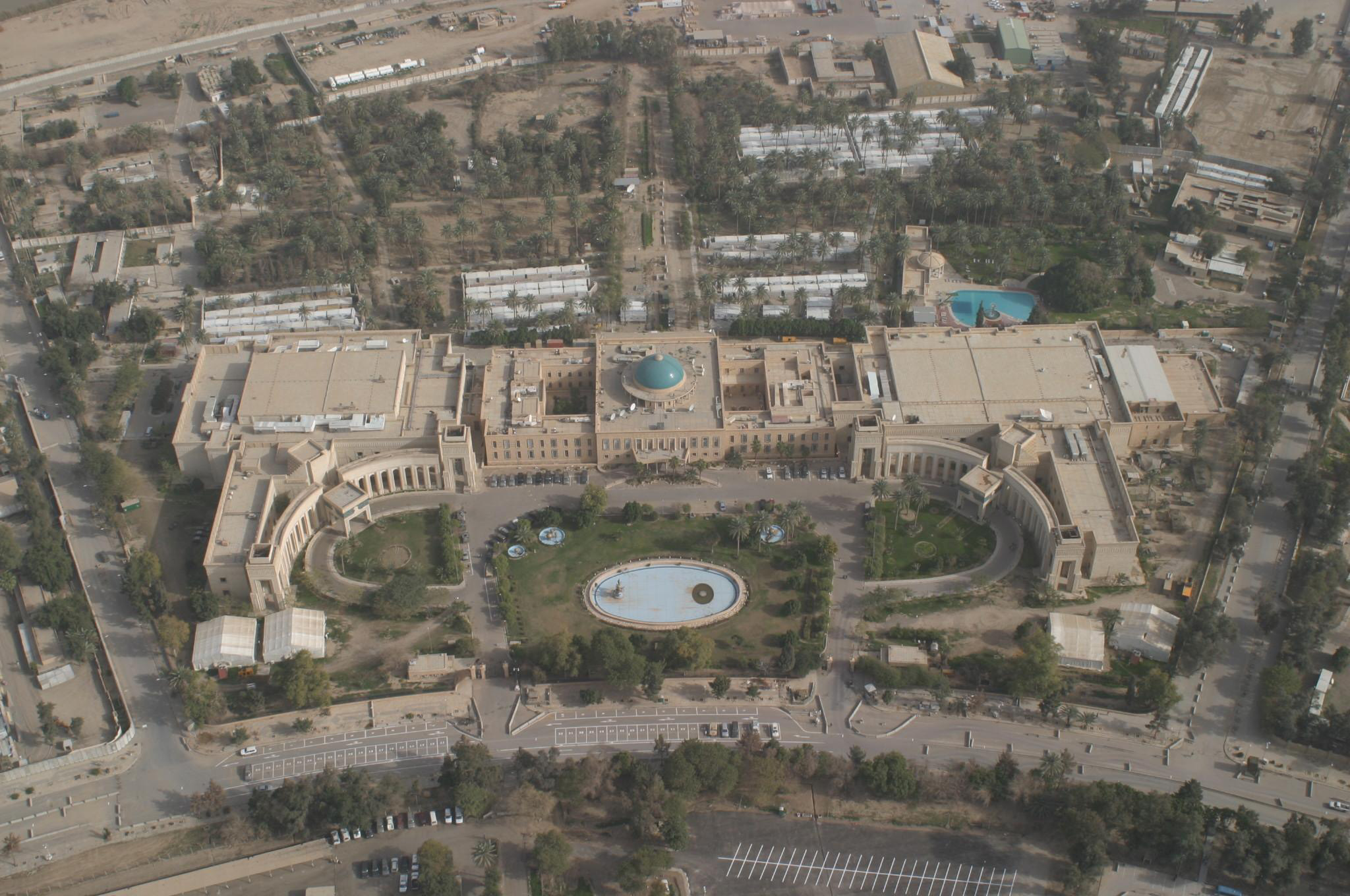
- The Republican Palace in 2007

General information
- Architectural style: Modernist
- Location: Baghdad, Iraq
- Year built: 1950s
- Completed: 1958
- Renovated: 2011
- Owner: Government of Iraq

Technical details
- Material: Concrete, Stone, Bronze

Design and construction
- Architect: J. Brian Cooper
- Known for: Bush shoeing incident

The Republican Palace (Arabic: القصر الجمهوري, al-Qaṣr al-Jumhūriy) is a palace in Baghdad, Iraq, constructed on the orders of King Faisal II and completed in the early 1960s. It was the third royal palace built during the Hashemite Kingdom of Iraq after Al-Rehab Palace and Al Zohour Palace. The palace was the administrative location of the Iraqi Presidency starting with the presidency of Abdul Salam Arif in 1963 until Saddam Hussein in 2003.

The palace was spared during the 2003 invasion of Iraq and was used as the Multi-National Force – Iraq coalition headquarters during the U.S. Occupation of Iraq as well as the American diplomatic mission in Iraq until 1 January 2009 when it was returned to the Iraqi Presidency. The area around the palace became known as the Green Zone.

== History ==
=== Early history ===
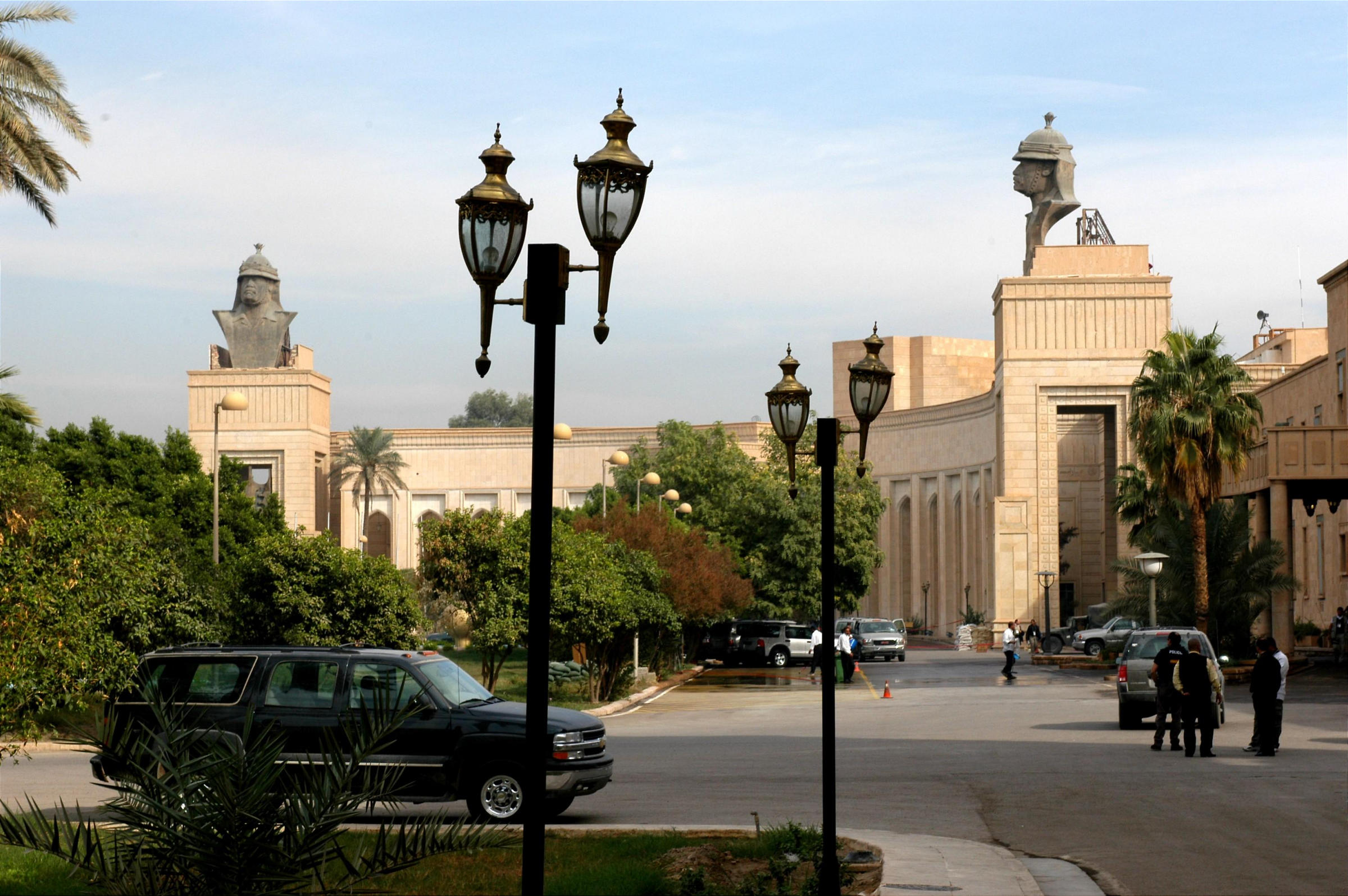
View of the front of the Iraqi Republican Palace prior to removal of the "Saddam the Warrior" bronze heads from the rooftop

The palace was officially commissioned by King Faisal II of Iraq in the 1950s to replace the Al-Rehab Palace as the new principal royal residence following his planned wedding to Egyptian Princess Sabiha Fazila Khanim Sultan. The architect was J. Brian Cooper of Birmingham, England, renowned for his modernist designs. The architect's watercolour, drawn by Lawrence Wright, shows that the then Royal Palace was originally designed to be only the central section under the dome with two wings. The rest of the building, extending out from these three sections, was added under Saddam Hussein, including large bronze portrait heads on the roof. The fountain in front of the Royal Palace was part of the original design. The young King would never live in the palace, as he was assassinated before his wedding in the 1958 coup. The palace was thus renamed the Republican Palace.

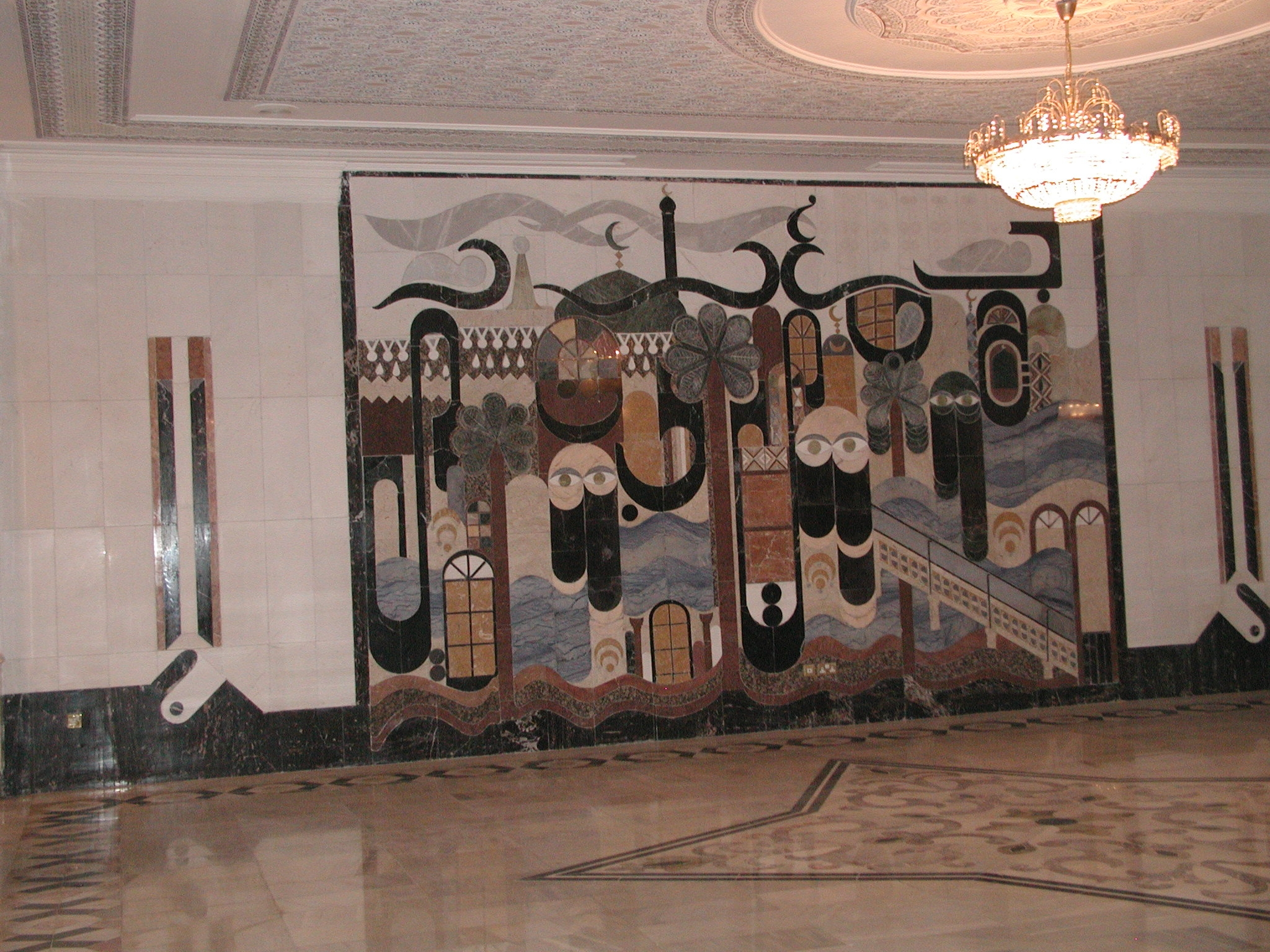
The Baghdad My Beloved (as it says at the top) mural, designed by Nahla in May 2003

In the early 1990s, Saddam sponsored a competition for original works of art for his palaces. Nahla, an Iraqi artist, architect, and member of the Iraqi National Symphony Orchestra, submitted a work on paper for a mural. She won first prize in the competition and her work was realized as shown, in the north wing of the Republican Palace, in stone, by other craftsman. She was allowed no part in the development of the mural and in fact, to this day, she has not seen it in person. Her first view of the completed mural was a photograph on a website. Nahla is currently living in exile in Paris, France.

Nahla's title of the piece, included in Arabic across the face of the mural, is Baghdad My Beloved.

=== Recent history ===
Before the new denizens moved in, the Palace was completely vacant and somewhat emptied by looters as some of the heavy brass gilded doors had been taken. This building in particular was not the reason that 4/64 Armor (3rd Infantry Division) and 1/6 Infantry (1st Armored Division) were securing this area. This entire area was home and office to all of the key Ba'ath Party officials and most of the documents and items being sought by the coalition forces. When the coalition forces rolled into this area on April 9, 2003, most of the occupants simply fled as fast as they could, taking only what they could carry.

==== Palace use ====
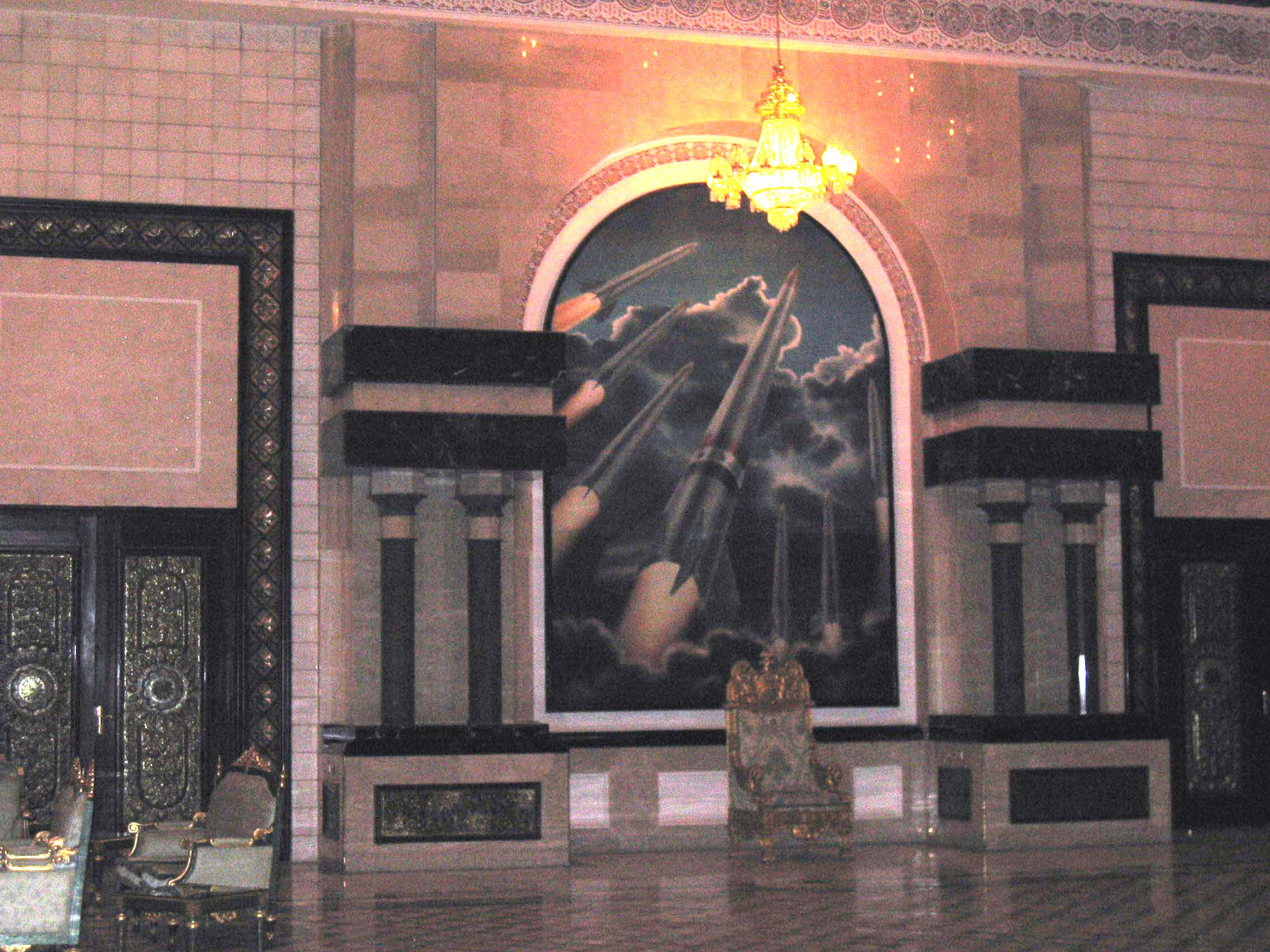
View of the Grand Dining Hall inside the Republican Palace in August 2003

As early as April 2003, some of the first tenants had started to occupy office space in the Palace, such as Andrew Goledzinowski (ORHA), of the Australian Foreign Affairs Council, charged with the task of setting up the new Iraqi Ministry of Justice. However, in May 2003, the Republican Palace was still mostly vacant as, until then, no one had realized that it was uncontrolled and space was available on a first-come, first-served basis. Charlie company 3/124 infantry of the Florida Army National Guard settled among the orange groves behind the palace and successfully provided security for the palace and a large portion of the sector from April 2003 to February 2004.

The influx of civilians to the Palace was immediate beginning with ORHA, US Department of Defense personnel, US State Department, and their respective contractors including the civilian life-support/logistics contracting company. In about a week, the Palace filled to absolute capacity with people commandeering any and every niche they could find to work in. Because there was not yet any central control of the building itself there were cases where people laid claim to the broom and supply closets. Work spaces doubled as sleeping space, except when the office was already filled. It was a frequent sight when walking the hallways to see someone sleeping on the floor. Because of the heat, it became common to see men and women in various states of undress as they slept while others worked only feet away. Halliburton was eventually contracted to convert the palace into use as an office space.

==== Moving out ====
During the time that the ORHA was reorganized into the Coalition Provisional Authority (CPA), new housing areas were assembled in the Palace grounds. People readily moved their sleeping areas out of the offices and halls and into small two-person units at the back of the Palace towards the river. When the changeover of power occurred in June 2004, the CPA went away and the US State Department assumed administrative control of what was now seen as a US asset. The palace now became the temporary US Embassy in Baghdad while the new embassy was being constructed down the road.

==== PCO offices ====
In addition to housing office space for the US Embassy staff, the palace also served as headquarters for the Army's Program Management Office (PMO), later Project and Contracting Office (PCO), while the PCO's off-site location was under construction. This lasted for quite some time as there were problems getting their own compound built. For this reason, the relatively new annex on the south wing of the Palace was dubbed the "PCO Annex." This was the same annex that a rocket struck on the night before the first elections in January 2005. The rocket fatally wounded two PCO members even though it did not explode. The PCO moved to their own compound elsewhere in the Green Zone in October 2005.

Up until mid-2005, there were many organizations using the Palace for office space but it was not for reasons of centralization at all - far from it. The place was crammed with people and information flow was inefficient at best. The main reason is that it was the only large hard-structure building that provided better protection from incoming mortars and at the same time was on a compound that is relatively easy to secure at a respectable distance from the building itself.

==== Dining facility ====
Until July 2005, there was a central dining facility inside one of the ballrooms. This caused many problems as the Palace was not designed for the foot-traffic flows in excess of 10,000 people a day. Prior to the invasion the palace included only Saddam Hussein's private dining room and kitchenettes for servants. There was rarely a meal served where the central-south wing of the first floor was not crammed with people, as this was the only dining facility (DFAC) that the coalition forces had set up for a long time. This was not a ballroom; it was the Republican Congress meeting room. It had a round table encompassing the entire room. This was removed and converted into a mess hall in the fall of 2003. It primarily served Southern food such as grits, cornbread, hot dogs, pork chops, and sausage. All of the food and water in the building was transported in from outside Iraq, and no Iraqis were hired as staff. Halliburton hired mostly Indian and Pakistani migrant workers from Kuwait. The extensive use of pork caused controversy since it is haram in Islam.

=== Renovation ===
In 2011, the Republican Palace was renovated for the 2011 Arab League Summit. Renovation work was done by a Turkish firm.

== Pool ==
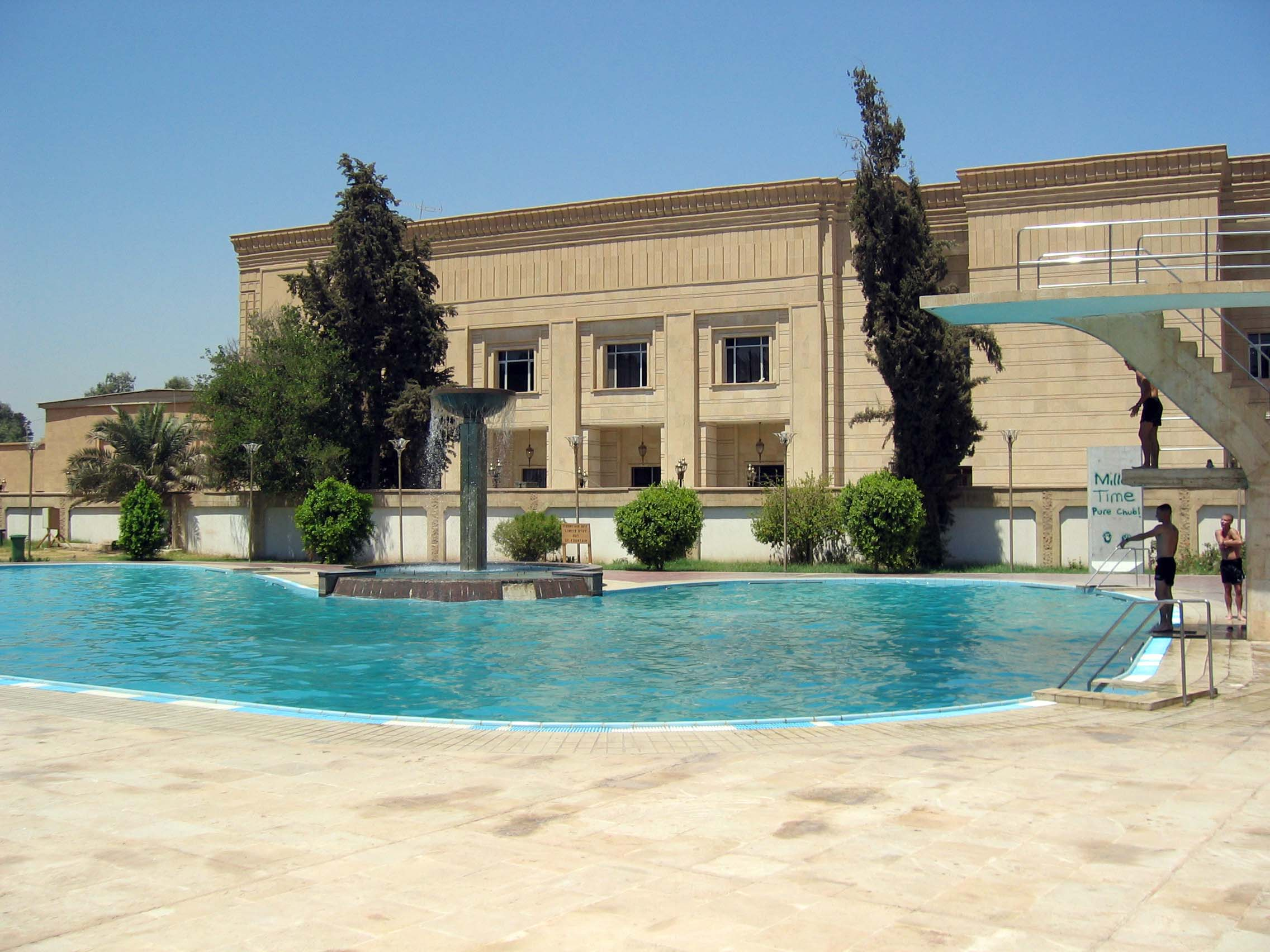
View of the rear of the palace with pool area

Behind the Republican Palace is a semi-kidney-shaped swimming pool, designed to serve as a luxurious private retreat. The pool features a multi-level diving platform, providing different levels for diving and relaxing. Adjacent to the pool is a stone cabana/pool house, which was intended to offer a shaded area for relaxation and entertainment. The pool area was originally built as part of the palace's lavish amenities and remains a distinctive feature of the palace grounds.

The pool area is located in the rear section of the palace, providing a quiet and secluded spot away from the main areas of the palace. It reflects the grandeur and opulence associated with Saddam Hussein’s era, showcasing his interest in maintaining an extravagant lifestyle.
