= 2013 Saladin governorate election =

2013 Saladin Governorate election
← 2009	20 April 2013	2017 →

All 29 seats for the Saladin Governorate council
Governor of Saladin before election
Mutashar al-Aliwi
Tawafuq
Subsequent Governor
Ahmed Abdullah al-Jubouri

The Saladin Governorate election of 2013 was held on 20 April 2013 alongside elections for all other governorates outside Iraqi Kurdistan, Kirkuk, Anbar and Nineveh.

== Results ==
Summary of the 20 April 2013 Saladin governorate election results
Party/Coalition	Allied national parties	Leader	Seats	Change	Votes
Iraqi People's Coalition		Ahmed Abdullah al-Jubouri	7		95,338
Muttahidoon	al-Hadba; Iraqi Islamic Party	Usama al-Nujayfi	5		79,705
Iraq's Authenticity Coalition			5		66,549
Al Iraqia National and United Coalition		Ayad Allawi	3		46,287
Salahuddine National Alliance			3		39,447
Equality Front					27,654
Arabian Al Iraqia			2		24,167
Salahuddine Unified Coalition			2		23,497
Brotherhood and Coexistence Alliance List	KDP; PUK		1		21,373
Salahuddine Turkmen's list			1		18,395
Iraq's Benevolence and Generosity List					6,099
Reformers Gathering					6,041
Iraq for Everyone National Bloc					4,243
Citizenship and Change Movement					3,117
Iraq's Light Movement					3,023
Iraqi Justice and Democracy Alliance					774
Islamic Advocates' Party					553
Law Advocate Knights' Bloc					468
Revolution Forces' Alliance in Iraq					461
Total			29	▲1	467,191
Sources: al-Sumaria – Salahuddin Coalitions, ISW, IHEC

Following the election Ahmed Abdullah al-Jubouri was re-elected as governor. In December 2013 Juburi was suspended by Prime Minister Nouri al-Maliki for at least two months while allegations of corruption were investigated.
