= 2013 Nineveh governorate election =

- 20 June 2013

All 39 seats for the Nineveh Governorate council
- Turnout: 37.5% (▼22.5%)
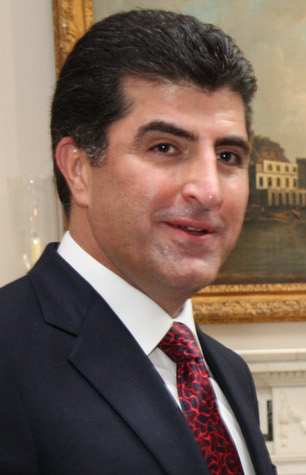

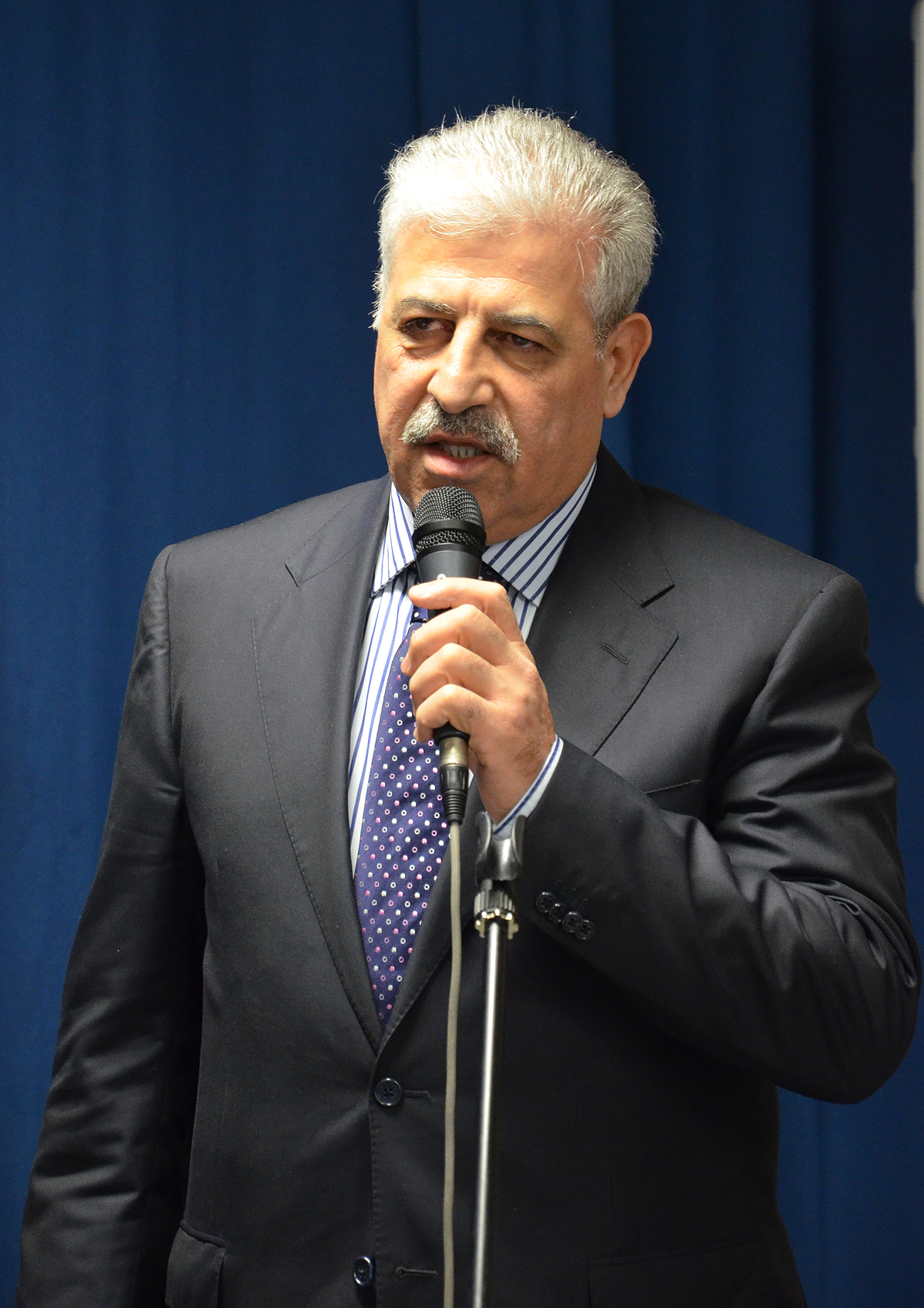
	First party	Second party
Leader	Nechervan Barzani	Atheel al-Nujaifi
Party	Kurdistani List	Muttahidoon
Last election	12	22
Seats won	11	8
Seat change	▼1	▼14
Popular vote	173,687	129,556
Percentage	29.87%	22.28%
Swing	▲2.39%	▼27.54%
- Elections in Nineveh and Al Anbar, marked in bright red, were delayed due to the deteriorating security situation.
Nineveh governor before election
Atheel al-Nujaifi
Al-Hadba
Subsequent governor
Atheel al-Nujaifi
Muttahidoon

The 2013 Nineveh Governorate election in Iraq was held on 20 June with elections for the Al Anbar Governorate. Due to security problems, turnout was less than half that of the 2009 election. This election saw Sunni Arab parties lose a number of seats to minority parties.

== Background ==
Nineveh is one of Iraq's most demographically-diverse governorates. Out of a population of about 2.8 million, 2013 estimates cited by Niqash claim about 300,000 Turkmen, (primarily in Tal Afar and Rashidiya. A similarly-sized population of Yazidis live in the districts of Shekhan and Sinjar and near the town of Bashiqa. Some 250,000 Shabaks live in villages north and east of Mosul, and 200,000 Assyrians live in Bashiqa, Bartella and Bakhdida. There is a sizable Kurdish population, with many Yazidis also identifying as Kurds. Although elections for 13 of Iraq's 18 governorates were held on 20 April, elections in Al Anbar and Nineveh were delayed due to security concerns in the ongoing insurgency and Sunni-led protests.

== Violence ==
As of 14 June there were eight attacks on provincial-council candidates in Nineveh, resulting in six deaths (including Muhanad Ghazi, a Sunni Arab candidate for the Iraqi Republican Gathering—a party supporting Prime Minister Nouri al-Maliki). Ghazi was shot dead by unknown gunmen whilst walking home from the East Mosul mosque.

Another local politician, Younis al-Rammah (leader of the moderate United Iraqi Gathering party), was killed on 19 June—the day before the election. Rammah was hosting a family gathering at a residence in Hadhar when a man embraced him, detonating a suicide vest and killing Rammah and four relatives. No group claimed responsibility for the attack, although Iraqi officials blamed it on attempts by the Islamic State of Iraq to disrupt the political process and return to sectarian violence. There was also violence on election day, with four Iraqi soldiers wounded by mortar rounds and roadside bombs in the Mosul area.

== Results ==
Summary of the 20 June 2013 Nineveh Governorate election results
Party/coalition	Allied national parties	Leader	Seats	Change	Votes	%	±%
Brotherhood and Coexistence Alliance List	KDP; PUK		11	▼1	173,687	29.87%	▲2.39%
Muttahidoon	al-Hadba; Iraqi Islamic Party	Usama al-Nujayfi	8	▼14	129,556	22.28%	▼27.54%
Loyalty to Nineveh List	Iraqi National Dialogue Front al-Hal	Ghanim al-Baso; Saleh al-Mutlaq; Jamal al-Karbouli	4		66,517	11.44%	
United Nineveh		Abdullah al-Yawer	3		45,971	7.91%	
Iraqi Construction and Justice Gathering		Dildar Zebari	3		39,126	6.73%	
Al Iraqia National and United Coalition		Ayad Allawi	2		31,276	5.38%	
Nineveh’s Bravery Coalition			1		23,361	4.02%	
Nineveh’s National Alliance			1		22,734	3.91%	
Oum Rabih Tribes’ National Gathering		Hassan Khulayf	1		21,349	3.67%	
Al Shabak Freemen Council			1		12,689	2.18%	
Yazidi Movement for Reform and Progress			1		10,397	1.79%	▲1.17%
Chaldean Syriac Assyrian Gathering Coalition	Gathered Force Movement; Chaldean National Congress; Chaldean Syriac Assyrian Popular Council; Assyrian National Party; Rafidain List; National Bet-Nahrain Union		1		8,635	1.49%	
Iraqi People’s Coalition			1		8,633	1.48%	
Iraq’s Benevolence and Generosity List		Dr Rushdi Said	1		8,076	1.39%	
Iraqi Freemen Coalition							
Iraq’s Advocates for State Support							
Reformers Gathering							
National Moderation Front							
United National Christian Assembly							
Iraq’s Unified Gathering		Younis al-Rammah					
Oum Rabih National Independent Gathering							
United Democratic ِArabic Movement							
Yuhanna Youssef Tuma Buta							
Future Path for Yazidis Party							
Free Yazidi Gathering							
Yazidi Democratic Front							
Yazidi Progress Party							
Shabak Independent Party							
Total			39	▲2	581,449		

== Analysis ==
The Uniters List, composed of al-Hadba and the Iraqi Islamic Party, had won 49.82 percent of the vote and 22 of 37 seats in the Nineveh Governorate Council in 2009. The party held eight of 39 council seats after the 2013 election. The local Arab parties lost control of the council, although Atheel al-Nujaifi remained governor. The new council president was Bashar Kiki, a Kurd; the new vice-president, Nour ad-Din Qabalan, was a Turkmen. Nujaifi's deputy, Abdul Qader Battoush, is also Kurdish. His second deputy, Hassan al-Allaf, is an Arab and one of three politicians elected from Mosul (which had produced a large number of Arab politicians in the previous election).

According to local political scientist Hamza Hussein, the number of seats won by minorities demonstrated popular discontent and lack of confidence in the previous council. Local activist Rabea Mustafa said that opposition to the previous council arose largely from resentment of its fractured nature, which hampered its ability to deliver basic services. Mustafa also said that the election result was due to minorities being driven out of Mosul because of violence; these minorities then settled elsewhere in Nineveh. Voter turnout in Mosul was low, due to security problems and a lack of confidence in the political process and the previous council. Candidates were better able to canvass outside Mosul due to better security, and many Mosul-based candidates withdrew from the election. Voter turnout was about half that of 2009: 581,449, compared to 995,169 in the previous election.
