= Iraqi National Movement =

al-Iraqiya List al-Haraka al-Wataniya al-Iraqiyya
- Iraqi National Movement logo
- Leader: Iyad Allawi
- Founded: October 2009
- Dissolved: December 2012
- Succeeded by: Muttahidoon; Al-Wataniya; Al-Arabiya Coalition; White Bloc
- Ideology: Iraqi nationalism; Secularism; Nonsectarianism
- Political position: Centre-right

The Iraqi National Movement (INM) (Arabic: الحركة الوطنية العراقية al-Ḥaraka al-Waṭaniya al-Iraqiyya), more commonly known as the al-Iraqiya List, was an Iraqi political coalition formed to contest the 2010 parliamentary election by Iraqi Vice President Tariq al-Hashimi's Renewal List, the Iraqi National Accord led by former Prime Minister Iyad Allawi and the Iraqi National Dialogue Front led by Saleh al-Mutlaq. The party included both Shi'a leaders (such as Allawi) and Sunni leaders (such as al-Mutlaq and al-Hashimi) and claimed to be secular and non-sectarian.

With 2,849,612 votes (24.7%) and 91 seats the Iraqiya List became the biggest list in the elections, winning two seats more than Nouri al-Maliki's State of Law Coalition, which won 89 seats and 2,792,083 votes (24.2%).

== 2010 parliamentary election ==
In the 2010 parliamentary election the coalition consisted of the following parties:

- Iraqi National Accord – led by former Prime Minister Iyad Allawi
- Iraqi National Dialogue Front – led by Saleh al-Mutlaq but due his ban it was led in the election by his brother Ibrahim al-Mutlaq
- Renewal List – led by Vice President Tariq al-Hashimi
- Iraqi Turkmen Front – led by Saadeddin Arkej, who did not run for the elections
- al-Hadba – led by Nineveh governor Atheel al-Nujayfi but for the election, by his brother Usama al-Nujayfi
- National Movement for Development and Reform (al-Hal) – led by Jamal Al-Karboli
- The Iraqis – led by ex-President Ghazi al-Yawer
- National Future Gathering – led by Deputy Prime Minister Rafi al-Issawi
- Iraqi Arab Gathering – led by Abdul Karim Abtan al-Jubouri
- Assembly of Independent Democrats – led by Adnan Pachachi
- Numerous Independent politicians

=== Results ===
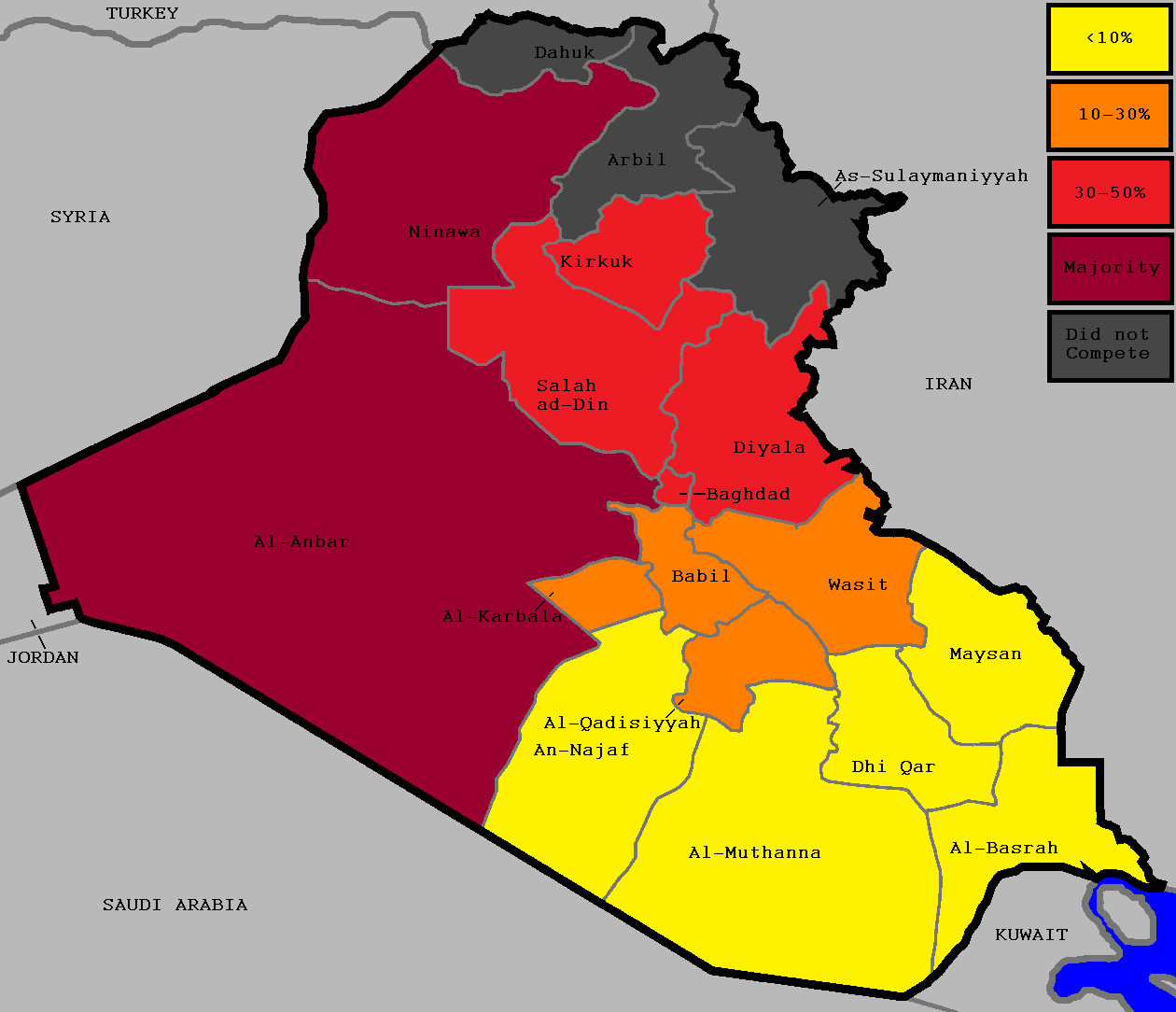
Performance of the al-Iraqiya List for the 2010 Iraqi Elections, per Governorate

Governorate	Votes	Percentage	Seats won	Total seats
Anbar	294,420	62.3%	11	14
Babil	104,746	17.9%	3	16
Baghdad	841,755	33.1%	24	68
Basra	75,387	9.3%	3	24
Dhi Qar	43,706	7.6%	1	18
Diyala	245,025	48.7%	8	13
Karbala	36,061	10.8%	1	10
Kirkuk	211,675	38.0%	6	12
Maysan	15,913	5.8%	0	10
Muthanna	17,712	7.7%	0	7
Najaf	29,652	7.2%	0	12
Nineveh	593,936	56.3%	20	31
Qadisiyyah	55,030	14.7%	2	11
Saladin	233,591	47.8%	8	12
Wasit	51,003	13.5%	2	11
Compensatory seats			2	7
Total:	2,849,612	24.8%	91	325

Party	Seats
Iraqi National Accord	28
Iraqi National Dialogue Front	16
al-Hal	13
al-Hadba	9
National Future Gathering	8
Renewal List	7
The Iraqis	6
Iraqi Turkmen Front	3
Iraqi Arab Gathering	1

== Post-election ==
Following the election the party was beset by political infighting in the post election period, with 8 MPs leaving in early March 2011 in order to set up the White Iraqiya Bloc.

Following the formation of the White Bloc, another 20 members of the Iraqi National Movement announced the formation of a new party within the list, under the name Youth of Iraq, headed by Talal Zobaie.

In April 2011, a further 5 MPs left the list in order to found the Free Iraqiya party.

The reasons for the many splits within the list were numerous, but some of the most often cited reasons were that a handful of list members had monopolised power and ignore the thousands of party members, a problem that is exacerbated by the fact that the party has no clear ideology or policies. These rifts have led to possible discussions between State of Law leader Prime Minister Nouri al-Maliki, and Saleh al-Mutlaq and Usama al-Nujayfi, of forming an electoral alliance for the 2013 Iraqi governorate elections, although some members of the Iraqi National Movement contend that the rumours over its internal problems are merely attempts by other parties to undermine it.

== See also ==
- Iraqi List
- Iraqi National List
