= 2013 Baghdad governorate election =

2013 Baghdad Governorate election
- 20 April 2013

All 58 seats for the Baghdad Governorate council
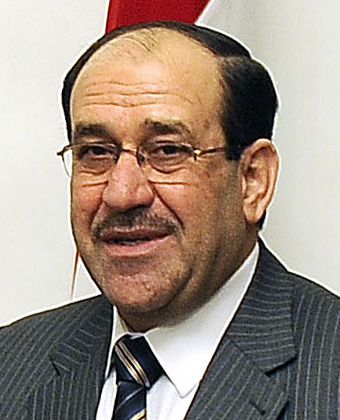

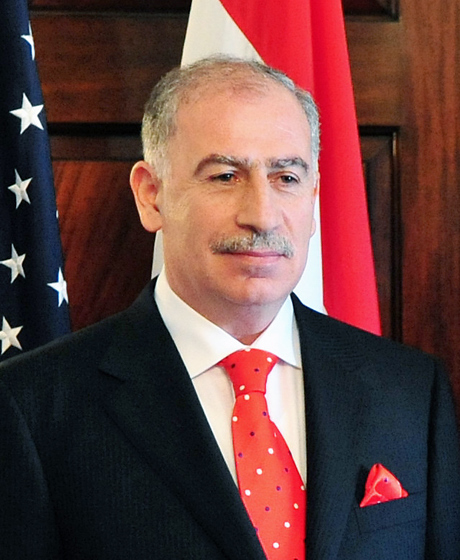

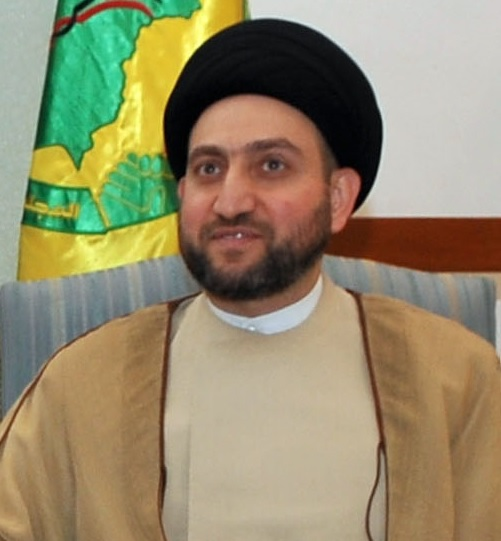
	First party	Second party	Third party
Leader	Nouri al-Maliki	Usama al-Nujayfi	Ammar al-Hakim
Party	State of Law	Muttahidoon	Al-Mehraab Martyr List
Last election	28	0	0
Seats before	28	0	3
Seats won	20	7	6
Seat change	▼8	▲7	▲3
Popular vote	569,178	183,716	163,022
Percentage	36.3%	11.7%	10.4%
Swing	▼1.6	▲11.7%	▲5%
	Fourth party
Leader	Muqtada al-Sadr
Party	Sadrist Movement
Last election	5
Seats before	5
Seats won	5
Seat change	No change
Popular vote	137,808
Percentage	8.8%
Swing	▼0.1
Governor of Baghdad before election
Salah Abd al-Razzaq
State of Law
Subsequent Governor
TBD

The Baghdad governorate election of 2013 was held on 20 April 2013 alongside elections for all other governorates outside Iraqi Kurdistan, Kirkuk, Anbar, and Nineveh.

== Results ==
Summary of the 20 April 2013 Baghdad governorate election results
Party/Coalition	Allied national parties	Leader	Seats	Change	Votes
State of Law Coalition		Nouri Al-Maliki	20	▼8	569,178
Muttahidoon		Usama al-Nujayfi	7	▲7	183,716
Citizens Alliance		Ammar al-Hakim	6	▲3	163,022
Liberal Coalition		Muqtada al-Sadr	5	-	137,808
Al Iraqia National and United Coalition			3	▼2	80,066
National Independent Elite Movement			3	▲3	78,429
Arabian Al Iraqia		Saleh al-Mutlaq	3	▼1	70,644
Citizenship State Bloc			2	▲2	48,605
National Partnership Gathering			1	▲1	31,889
Islamic Dawa Party - Iraq Organization			1	▲1	24,339
Iraqi Justice and Democracy Alliance	Iraqi Communist Party People's Party (Iraq) National Democratic Party (Iraq) Social Democratic Current	Faiq Al Sheikh Ali	1	▲1	23,388
Free Iraqi Coalition			1	▲1	15,957
Iraq's Benevolence and Generosity List			1	▲1	15,162
People's Will					10,595
New Dawn Bloc					10,559
Urban Civil Tribes Gathering					8,966
Feylis Kurds Brotherhood List; Kurdish Minority seat			1		8,675
Iraqi Civil State Coalition					7,567
Civilians Are Coming Coalition					7,209
Iraq's Integrity Gathering					6,834
Arabs' Frontier					6,330
Iraq's Advocates for State Support					5,594
National Flag Gathering					5,346
Iraq Cadres Bloc					5,292
National Moderation Front					4,463
Hajj Hamid Ibrahim Abdul Karim	Independent				4,443
National Tribal Movement in Iraq					4,127
Islamic Advocates' Party					3,246
Equitable State Movement					2,922
Haydar Kathem Makawi	Independent				2,903
The Iraqi Conservative Secretaries' Party Future List					2,881
Iraq's Party for Freedom Nabil Al Aaraji					2,543
Baghdad's Image					2,208
Law Advocate Knights' Bloc					1,999
Independent Iraqi Qualifications Gathering					1,954
Baghdad Turkmen list Turkmen Minority seat			1		1,947
Chaldean Syriac Assyrian Popular Council; Christian Minority seat			1		1,513
The Advocate's Party					1,179
United National Christian Assembly					1,066
Feylis Kurds Pledge Bloc					1,032
Raed Jabar Saleh; Sabian Minority seat	Independent		1		781
Iraqi Authentic Renaissance Movement					692
Dakhel Yussef Aamara					630
Total			58	▲1	1,567,699
Sources: ISW, al-Sumaria - Baghdad Coalitions, IHEC Baghdad Results Archived 2013-09-03 at the Wayback Machine
