= Mohammed Tawfiq Allawi =

Former Prime Minister-designate of Iraq

- محمد توفيق علاوي
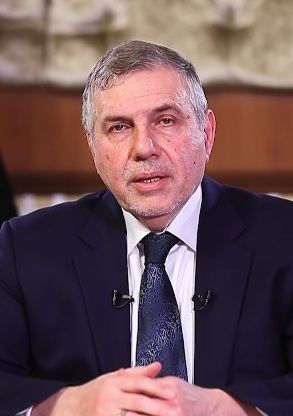

Member of the Council of Representatives
- In office January 2005 – May 2006

Minister of Communications
- In office May 2006 – August 2007
- In office 2010–2012

Personal details
- Born: Mohammed Tawfiq Allawi; 1 July 1954 (age 72) Baghdad, Kingdom of Iraq
- Citizenship: Iraq, United Kingdom
- Education: University of Baghdad (BA unfinished); American University of Beirut (BA)
- Website: mohammedallawi.com

Mohammed Tawfiq Allawi (Arabic: محمد توفيق علاوي; born 1 July 1954) is an Iraqi politician who served as Minister of Communications in the Al Maliki government from May 2006 until August 2008 and from 2010 to 2012. Both times he resigned from his position in protest against al-Maliki's sectarian agenda and political interference. In February 2020, during a time of political deadlock brought on by nationwide protests, he was nominated to the position of Prime Minister of Iraq as a compromise candidate but withdrew after Parliament failed to reach a quorum.

== Education ==
Allawi studied Architectural Engineering at Baghdad University, when he left mid-way through his studies as he was wanted by the government of Saddam Hussein. He went into exile and moved to Lebanon in 1977, where he completed his education and obtained a degree in Architecture from the American University of Beirut in 1980. He then moved to the United Kingdom, where he gained citizenship.

== Business ==
While in higher education he co-founded the Tawfiq Allawi Cable & Electric Wire Factory which manufactured various raw materials including marble, concrete and PVC. His factories were confiscated by the Iraqi government in 1997. Allawi went on to found a cereal bar factory and a software company in England and to work in property development in Lebanon, Morocco and the real estate market in the UK.

== Interfaith International ==
Allawi joined Interfaith International, a Swiss based NGO that supported the human rights of Muslim minorities during the Yugoslav Wars.

== Politics ==
Allawi participated in the Salah Al-Din Conference of opposition parties in 1992 and the London Conference in 2002. He was elected to the Council of Representatives of Iraq in the Iraqi parliamentary election of January 2005. He is a cousin of Ayad Allawi who founded the opposition Iraqi National Accord and went on to be the interim Prime Minister of Iraq from 2004 to 2005.

In May 2006, Allawi was appointed Minister of Communications in the Al Maliki government. After fifteen months he withdrew from the government, citing the Prime Minister's practice of making appointments on a sectarian basis. He rejoined parliament and remained in opposition for the remainder of the government's term. He returned as Minister of Communications in the newly formed government in 2010, but also resigning after citing the interference of prime minister Nouri al-Maliki in his ministry.

He has since remained as a public commentator on Iraqi political affairs, with a series of articles published in Iraqi media outlets and on his blog.

=== Minister of Communications ===
Allawi was twice minister of communications, from May 2006 until August 2007, and from 2010 to 2012. Both times he left the position with a resignation. In 2007 he resigned and rejoined the parliament to replace a deceased member. In 2012, he resigned in protest against al-Maliki's agenda, describing it as sectarian and corrupt.

One of Allawi's key policies was rooting out corruption. As communications minister, he implemented a policy that imposed strict anti-bribery terms on every company contracting with the ministry. These terms included that if the company was discovered to have paid a bribe to anyone in the ministry, a fine worth 30% of the contract would be imposed on the contracting company and the company would be blacklisted (preventing it from contracting with any government entity for three years).

=== 2020 Prime Minister appointment ===
Allawi was appointed prime minister of Iraq on 1 February 2020 in the context of the Iraqi protests of 2019–20, replacing Adil Abdul-Mahdi, who had remained as caretaker prime minister for two months after resigning in response to the protests.

Allawi's appointment as prime minister came as a result of nearly 4 months of Iraqi protests which were marred by more than 600 deaths amongst unarmed peaceful protestors outcried by the Iraqi civil society and the international community alike. His appointment was met with a popular uproar amongst Iraqi protesters for his perceived affiliation with the same root causes that triggered the October 2019 Iraqi protests including ' dissatisfaction with the country's political elite's mismanagement of the Iraq's economy and multiple catastrophic security disasters over a 16 year span including the rise of Islamic State of Iraq and the Levant and systemic widespread corruption which resulted in Iraq's rank as one of the most corrupt governments in the world for nearly 16 consecutive years. On 1 March 2020, Allawi withdrew his candidacy after parliament failed for the second time in a week to approve his cabinet.

== Personal life ==
He is a cousin of Ayad Allawi.
