= Aisha Ghazal Mahdi =

Iraqi politician

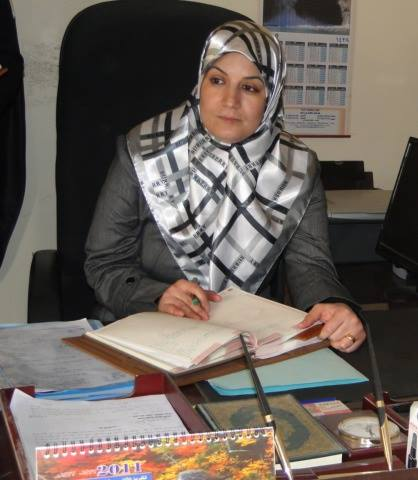
- Born: 1971 (age 54–55)
- Occupation: Politician

Aisha Ghazal Mahdi (Arabic: عائشة المساري) (born 1971), is an Iraqi politician, member of the Council of Representatives since 2014 representing the Baghdad Governorate with the Muttahidoon between 2014 and 2018 and with National Coalition since 2018, being member of the Services and Constructions Committee. She got a bachelor's degree in Education and a certificate of higher qualification in Management. Previously served as a member of the Baghdad Provincial Council (2009-2014).
