= Renewal List =

Renewal Movement قائمة تجديد Tajdeed
- Leader: Tariq al-Hashimi
- Founded: 2009
- Split from: Iraqi Islamic Party
- Seats in the Council of Representatives of Iraq: 0 / 328
- Seats in the Governorate Councils: 0 / 601

Website
- tajdeediq.net

The Renewal List (Tajdeed) is an Iraqi political party founded by the Sunni Arab Vice President of Iraq, Tariq al-Hashimi in 2009 to contest the Iraqi legislative election of 2010.

Hashimi was the leader of the Iraqi Islamic Party, a Sunni Arab religious party that won the largest number of seats of any Sunni Arab party in the Iraqi legislative election of December 2005. He was elected vice president in 2006.

In 2009 he stepped down as leader of the IIP and announced the new party, which he said would "include academics, intellectuals and tribal leaders" and would be "above sectarian and ethnic divisions"

== Electoral performance ==
| Election | Number of votes | Share of votes | Seats | Affiliation | Outcome of election |
|---|---|---|---|---|---|
| 2010 | | | 7 / 325 | Iraqi National Movement | State of Law victory |
