= 2002 Iraqi opposition conference =

- Native name: مؤتمر المعارضة العراقية کۆنگرەی ئۆپۆزسیۆنی عێراق
- Date: December 14–17, 2002
- Location: London, United Kingdom
- Theme: "To Save Iraq and Achieve Democracy"

An Iraqi opposition conference was held in London, United Kingdom, from 14 to 17 December 2002. The gathering was attended by more than 300 participants representing various political parties, organizations, and independent Iraqi figures.

The proceedings were dedicated to examining the phase following the overthrow of President Saddam Hussein. Ahmed Chalabi, a member of the conference leadership, affirmed that the objective was not the formation of a government-in-exile, but a national unity government that rejects the imposition of foreign rule as desired by the United States. The conference opened at a major London hotel under stringent security measures. The United States sent a delegation led by Zalmay Khalilzad, who had recently been appointed as Special Envoy for his country to the 'Free Iraqis'.

The final statement of the conference called for the transformation of Iraq into a democratic, parliamentary, pluralistic, and federal state. The participants committed to repealing all administrative measures enacted by the regime since 1968 that affected the demographic composition of Iraqi Kurdistan.

Ayad Allawi, leader of the Iraqi National Accord, urged military and tribal forces to play an active role in bringing the regime to an end. Speaking for him, Salah al-Shaikhly noted that the opposition’s inability to topple the regime independently necessitated the involvement of the international community. He emphasized that the U.S.-led international factor was now of major importance in supporting the transition.

== Attendees ==
- Ahmed Chalabi, head of the Iraqi National Congress
- Sharif Ali bin al-Hussein, leader of the Iraqi Constitutional Monarchy
- Ayad Allawi, Secretary-General of the Iraqi National Accord
- Masoud Barzani, leader of the Kurdistan Democratic Party
- Jalal Talabani, leader of the Patriotic Union of Kurdistan
- Zalmay Khalilzad, U.S. Special Envoy to the 'Free Iraqis'
