= 2013 Iraqi governorate elections =

3rd Iraqi governorate elections

- 20 April 2013

447 seats comprising 14 of the 18 governorates of Iraq
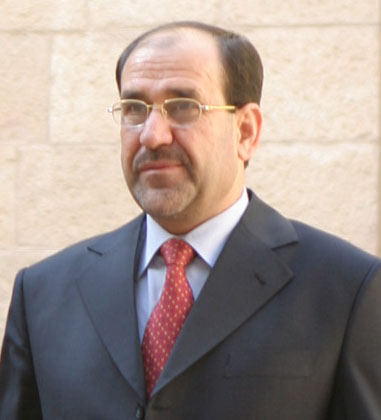

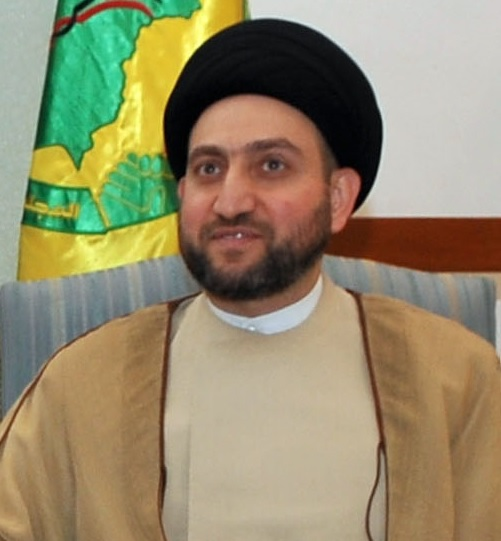
	First party	Second party	Third party
Leader	Nouri al-Maliki	Ammar al-Hakim	Muqtada al-Sadr
Party	State of Law	Muwatin coalition	Sadrist Movement
Last election	126	52	43
Seats won	102	65	60
Seat change	▼24	▲13	▲17
Popular vote	1,890,567	943,646	653,763
Percentage	26.21%	13.08%	9.06%
Swing	▼24	▲13	▲17
- Colours show the largest list in every governorate State of Law Coalition Shiite List Liberal Coalition Muttahidoon Kurdistan Alliance Independents/Local List Elections not held

Provinces holding election are green; Al Anbar and Nineveh (red), Kirkuk (blue) and Iraqi Kurdistan (dark red) postponed their elections.

Governorate or provincial elections were held in Iraq on 20 April 2013, to replace the local councils in the governorates of Iraq that were elected in the Iraqi governorate elections of 2009. Elections took place in 12 of Iraq's 18 governorates. Elections didn't take place in the 3 governorates forming the Kurdistan Region or Kirkuk, Anbar, or Nineveh, meaning that a total of 378 provincial council seats were up for election.

The Iraqi government later decided on 19 March to delay the elections in the governorates of Anbar and Nineveh due to ongoing instability caused by the insurgency and the ongoing protests, prompting criticism from Muqtada al-Sadr and John Kerry. Elections for Anbar and Nineveh were held on 20 June.

== Electoral Law ==
There have been several disputes about the electoral law that is to be used for the election. The current electoral law, which was also used in the 2009 election, states that if certain parties don't get enough votes, their votes and seats are given to the larger parties. In the 2009 election this led to many smaller parties failing to take any seats. Because of the disproportionate affect this law had on smaller parties, the Supreme Court of Iraq declared the law unconstitutional, as it restricted democracy.

In spite of this ruling, and mostly due to the fact that because the law benefits the largest parties they have little incentive to change it, the law has yet to be changed. If not changed, the unconstitutional nature of the law however would make the 2013 election results vulnerable to a legal challenge. As a result, although this does not currently effect the work of the Independent High Electoral Commission, IHEC has been calling on the Iraqi government to pass changes to the law.

In response to this, on 13 December 2012 the Iraqi parliament voted to adopt the Sainte-Laguë method as the new electoral method.

== Participants ==
Parties and candidates wishing to stand for election had to register by the deadline of 25 November 2012. By the time of the deadline 243 entities, including 16 independent candidates, had registered, with some of the entities registering to participate for the first time. As a result of the large number of applications submitted for the registration of political coalitions for the election, IHEC decided to extend the deadline for submissions from the 13th to the 18th of December.

One of the biggest changes to the political coalitions taking part is the fact that the State of Law Coalition has expanded from its traditional supporters, with former opponents such as the Badr Organization, the National Reform Trend, the Islamic Virtue Party, and the secular Shiite White Iraqiya Bloc all joining the coalition for the election. Despite the massive size of the coalition, it is exclusively Shiite.

According to IHEC, a total of 8,224 candidates registered to run in the elections, including 131 candidates who have since been barred by IHEC from running due to their ties to the Iraqi Ba'ath Party.

== Preliminary results ==
According to preliminary results from the 12 governorates were elections were held, Nouri al-Maliki's expanded State of Law Coalition would come in first place with 115 seats, second would come ISCI with 80 seats and Sadr Movement would win 50.

With 87-90% of the vote counted, the results were as following:

Province	Maliki	Hakim	Sadr	Allawi	Nujaifi	Mutlaq	Kurds	Pan-Shi'a	Local
Basra	46.3%	19.6%	9.6%	2.0%	1.6%				5%
Maysan	32.4%	22.9%	33.1%						
Dhi Qar	32.4%	23.0%	15.3%						9.5%
Muthanna	30.2%	26.0%	12.5%						10.7%
Qadisiyyah	29.6%	17.1%	13.4%						8.3%
Babil	20.5%	20.8%	9.3%	4.4%					12.4%
Najaf	14.4%	15.4%	8.5%						22.1%
Karbala	23.1%	9.1%	12.2%						9.4%
Wasit	26.3%	24.2%	17.7%						8.3%
Baghdad	37.1%	10.4%	7.7%	5.0%	12.3%	4.9%			
Saladin	-	-	-	6.5%	12.0%	3.2%	2.5%	6.1%	12.6%
Diyala	-	-	-	4.5%			3.1%	11.8%	24.8%
Source: Al Monitor,

== Results ==
=== Total seats ===
Party	Total votes	Percentage	Total seats	Party leader
State of Law Coalition	1,890,567	26.21%	102	Nouri al-Maliki
Citizens Alliance	943,646	13.08%	66	Ammar al-Hakim
Liberal Coalition	653,763	9.06%	60	Muqtada al-Sadr
Muttahidoon	518,968	7.19%	35	Atheel al-Nujaifi
Arabian Al Iraqia			18	Saleh al-Mutlaq
Kurdistan List	255,362	3.54%	17	Barham Salih
Al Iraqia National and United Coalition	298,198	4.13%	16	Ayad Allawi
Civil Democratic Alliance			11	Ali Khathem Aziz
Loyalty to Najaf	118,310	1.64%	9	Adnan al-Zurufi
Islamic Dawa Party – Iraq Organisation			7	Hashim Al-Mosawy
Iraqi People's Coalition			8	
Hope of Rafidain			3	
Iraq's Benevolence and Generosity List	65,634	0.91%	3	Dr Rushdi Said
National White Bloc	44,765	0.62%	2	Hassan Alawi
Other Parties			99	-
Total	7,214,146	100%	447	-
Source: ISW, Gulf Analysis, IHEC, Musings on Iraq

=== Al Anbar Governorate ===
Party	Total votes	Percentage	Seats	Party leader
Muttahidoon	115,605	27.89%	8	Osama al-Nujaifi
Aabiroun Coalition	62,581	15.10%	5	Qasim Al-Fahdawi
Arabian Al Iraqia	57,332	13.83%	4	Saleh al-Mutlaq
Al Iraqia National and United Coalition	39,500	9.53%	3	Ayad Allawi
Al Anbar United Coalition	35,214	8.49%	3	Kamil al-Dulaymi
National Cooperation Coalition	32,718	7.89%	2	Ali Farhan
People’s Will Project	25,210	6.08%	2	Sheikh Mohamad Daham Al Farhan
Iraq’s Affluents	10,785	2.60%	1	Sheikh Jamal Al Jadaan
Amiroun Coalition	9,220	2.22%	1	Ahmad Raja
Valiants of Iraq Bloc	8,932	2.15%	1	Sheikh Majed Ali Al Sulayman
Other parties	17,457	4.21%	-	
Total	414,554	100%	30	
Sources: al-Sumaria – al-Anbar Coalitions, IHEC

=== Babil Governorate ===
Party	Total votes	Percentage	Seats	Party leader
State of Law Coalition	142,568	25.98%	8	Nouri al-Maliki
Citizens Alliance	115,188	20.99%	7	Ammar al-Hakim
Independent Iraqi Qualifications Gathering	69,087	12.59%	4	Hamed Ahmad Aboud Radi
Liberal Coalition	51,869	9.45%	4	Muqtada al-Sadr
Babil Civil Alliance	30,578	5.57%	2	Akil Jaber Hamza Saleh
Al Iraqia National and United Coalition	24,227	4.42%	1	
Iraq’s National Coalition	20,755	3.78%	1	
Islamic Dawa Party – Iraq Organisation	19,527	3.56%	1	Hashim Al-Mosawy
National Partnership Gathering	18,565	3.38%	1	Mohamed Fadel Obeid Omran
Al Amin Coalition	16,865	3.07%	1	
Iraqia Babel	12,754	2.32%	1	Osama al-Nujaifi; Saleh al-Mutlaq
Other parties	26,688	4.86%	-	
Total	548,671	100%	31	
Sources: ISW, al-Sumaria – Babil Coalitions, IHEC Babil Results

=== Baghdad Governorate ===
Party	Total votes	Percentage	Seats	Party leader
State of Law Coalition	569,178	36.31%	20	Nouri al-Maliki
Muttahidoon	183,716	11.72%	7	Osama al-Nujaifi
Citizens Alliance	163,022	10.40%	6	Ammar al-Hakim
Liberal Coalition	137,808	8.79%	4	Muqtada al-Sadr
Al Iraqia National and United Coalition	80,066	5.12%	3	Ayad Allawi
National Independent Elite Movement	78,429	5.00%	3	
Arabian Al Iraqia	70,644	4.51%	3	Saleh al-Mutlaq
Citizenship State Bloc	48,605	3.10%	2	
National Partnership Gathering	31,889	2.03%	1	
Islamic Dawa Party – Iraq Organisation	24,339	1.55%	1	Hashim Al-Mosawy
Iraqi Justice and Democracy Alliance	23,388	1.49%	1	
Free Iraqi Coalition	15,957	1.02%	1	
Iraq’s Benevolence and Generosity List	15,162	0.97%	1	Dr Rushdi Said
Feylis Kurds Brotherhood List; Kurdish Minority seat	8,675	0.55%	1	
Baghdad Turkmen list Turkmen Minority seat	1,947	0.12%	1	
Chaldean Syriac Assyrian Popular Council; Assyrian Minority seat	1,513	0.10%	1	
Raed Jabar Saleh; Sabian Minority seat	781	0.05%	1	-
Other parties	112,580	7.18%	-	
Total	1,567,699	100%	58	
Sources: ISW, al-Sumaria – Baghdad Coalitions, IHEC Baghdad Results

=== Basra Governorate ===
Party	Total votes	Percentage	Seats	Party leader
State of Law Coalition	292,658	45.17%	16	Nouri al-Maliki
Citizens Alliance	121,875	18.81%	6	Ammar al-Hakim
Liberal Coalition	58,312	9.00%	3	Muqtada al-Sadr
Basra Independent Coalition	29,384	4.54%	2	
Gathering of Justice and Unity	24,513	3.78%	1	al-Faiz
Al Barsa’s Civil Alliance	17,541	2.71%	1	
Alternative Movement	15,643	2.41%	1	
Islamic Dawa Party – Iraq Organisation	15,493	2.39%	1	Hashim Al-Mosawy
Will of Iraq Movement	13,940	2.15%	1	
Al Iraqia National and United Coalition	13,319	2.06%	1	Ayad Allawi
Muttahidoon	10,386	1.60%	1	Osama al-Nujaifi
Other parties	34,873	5.38%	-	
Total	647,937	100%	35	
Sources: ISW, al-Sumaria – Basra Coalitions, IHEC Basra Results

=== Dhi Qar Governorate ===
Party	Total votes	Percentage	Seats	Party leader
State of Law Coalition	176,861	33.11%	10	Nouri al-Maliki
Citizens Alliance	122,088	22.84%	7	Ammar al-Hakim
Liberal Coalition	81,338	15.22%	7	Muqtada al-Sadr
Solidarity with Iraq	50,363	9.43%	3	Talib Qathem Abdul Karim Al Hassan
National Loyalty Bloc	43,369	8.12%	3	Habib Nour Mahdi Nehme
National Partnership Gathering	26,670	5.00%	2	Hamid naim Khudayr Abdullah
Civil Democratic Coalition	17,906	3.35%	1	Shahid Ahmad Hassan Mohamed
Other parties	15,720	2.93%	-	
Total	534,315	100%	31	
Sources: ISW, al-Sumaria – Dhi Qar Coalitions, IHEC Dhi Qar Results

=== Diyala Governorate ===
Party	Total votes	Percentage	Seats	Party leader
Diyala’s National Alliance	170,292	37.08%	12	Nouri al-Maliki
Iraqi Diyala	149,535	32.56%	10	
Feylis Kurds Brotherhood List	49,415	10.76%	3	
Al Iraqia National and United Coalition	27,670	6.02%	2	Ayad Allawi
Determined to Build	17,935	3.90%	1	
Diyala’s New Coalition	13,980	3.04%	1	
Other parties	30,484	6.64%	-	
Total	459,311	100%	29	
Sources: ISW, al-Sumaria – Diyala Coalitions, IHEC Diyala Results

=== Karbala Governorate ===
Party	Total votes	Percentage	Seats	Party leader
State of Law Coalition	84,447	26.43%	7	Nouri al-Maliki
Liberal Coalition	43,945	13.58%	4	Muqtada al-Sadr
Al Liwa	33,614	10.39%	3	
Citizens Alliance	33,362	10.31%	3	Ammar al-Hakim
Hope for the Mesopotamia	32,527	10.03%	3	
Equitable State Movement	32,454	10.03%	3	
National Moderation Front	18,501	5.72%	2	
Iraq’s Advocates for State Support	13,102	4.05%	1	
Iraqi Justice and Democracy Alliance	8,559	2.64%	1	
Other parties	23,288	6.85%	2	
Total	323,726	100%	27	
Sources: ISW, al-Sumaria – Karbala Coalitions, IHEC Karbala Results

=== Maysan Governorate ===
Party	Total votes	Percentage	Seats	Party leader
Liberal Coalition	89,906	33.01%	9	Muqtada al-Sadr
State of Law Coalition	77,917	28.61%	8	Nouri al-Maliki
Citizens Alliance	63,060	23.15%	6	Ammar al-Hakim
Honesty and Generosity	11,605	4.26%	1	Sajed Abdul Wahed Karim Said
National Partnership Gathering	10,771	3.95%	1	Jasem Saheb Obeid Sadkhan
National Flag Gathering	9,814	3.60%	1	Naser Hussein Jabbar Ghadib
Islamic Dawa Party – Iraq Organisation	5,615	2.06%	1	Hashim Al-Mosawy
Other parties	3,665	1.35%	-	
Total	272,353	100%	27	
Sources: ISW, al-Sumaria – Maysan Coalitions, IHEC Maysan Results

=== Muthanna Governorate ===
Party	Total votes	Percentage	Seats	Party leader
State of Law Coalition	76,777	30.61%	9	Nouri al-Maliki
Citizens Alliance	67,203	26.79%	7	Ammar al-Hakim
Liberal Coalition	31,290	12.47%	3	Muqtada al-Sadr
Independent Iraqi Qualifications Gathering	27,065	10.79%	3	Adel Nazek Abdul Saheb Ali
Gathering for Al Muthana	24,931	9.94%	2	Mohamd Radi Sultan Ashlukh
Al Muthanna Alliance for Change & Reconstruction	17,561	7.00%	2	Ghazi Mussa Kathem Abdul Hussein
Other parties	6,029	2.40%	-	
Total	250,856	100%	26	
Sources: ISW, al-Sumaria – Muthanna Coalitions, IHEC Muthanna Results

=== Najaf Governorate ===
Party	Total votes	Percentage	Seats	Party leader
Loyalty to Najaf	118,310	29.33%	9	Adnan al-Zurufi
Citizens Alliance	82,020	20.34%	6	Ammar al-Hakim
State of Law Coalition	76,519	18.97%	5	Nouri al-Maliki
Liberal Coalition	45,167	11.20%	4	Muqtada al-Sadr
Equitable State Movement	25,889	6.42%	2	
Najaf Province’s Change Coalition	14,464	3.59%	1	
National Partnership Gathering	14,314	3.55%	1	
Renaissance and Building Gathering	8,521	2.11%	1	
Islamic Dawa Party – Iraq Organisation	7,571	1.88%	1	Hashim Al-Mosawy
Other parties	10,546	2.61%	-	
Total	403,321	100%	29	
Sources: ISW, al-Sumaria – Najaf Coalitions, IHEC Najaf Results

=== Nineveh Governorate ===
Party	Total votes	Percentage	Seats	Party leader
Brotherhood and Coexistence Alliance List	173,687	29.87%	11	
Muttahidoon	129,556	22.28%	8	Osama al-Nujaifi
Loyalty to Nineveh List	66,517	11.44%	4	Saleh al-Mutlaq
United Nineveh	45,971	7.91%	3	Sheikh Abdullah al-Yawer
Iraqi Construction and Justice Gathering	39,126		3	Deldar Zebari
Al Iraqia National and United Coalition	31,276		2	Ayad Allawi
Nineveh's Bravery Coalition	23,361		1	
Nineveh's National Alliance	22,734		1	
Oum Rabih Tribes' National Gathering	21,349		1	Hassan Khulayf
Al Shabak Freemen Council	12,689		1	
Yazidi Movement for Reform and Progress	10,397		1	
Iraqi People's Coalition	8,633		1	
Chaldean Syriac Assyrian Gathering Coalition	8,635		1	
Iraq's Benevolence and Generosity List	8,076		1	Dr Rushdi Said
Other parties				
Total	581,449	100%	39	
Sources: al-Sumaria – Nineveh Coalitions, IHEC

=== Al-Qādisiyyah Governorate ===
Party	Total votes	Percentage	Seats	Party leader
State of Law Coalition	114,697		8	Nouri al-Maliki
Citizens Alliance	66,691		5	Ammar al-Hakim
Liberal Coalition	50,544		4	Muqtada al-Sadr
Al Diwaniyah People's Independent Coalition	49,831		4	Jaafar Mussa Zaalan Hachem
National White Bloc	33,092		2	Khudayr Sharif Khudayr Razam
Islamic Dawa Party – Iraq Organisation	29,517		2	Hashim Al-Mosawy
Loyalty to Iraq Coalition	11,207		1	Baqer Ali Shaalan Salman
Al Diwaniyah's Civil Alliance	9,472		1	Ali Fawzi Zaydan Kitn
Equitable State Movement	8,141		1	Ghanem Mekled Jalub Aziz
Other parties				
Total		100%	28	
Sources: ISW, al-Sumaria – Al-Qādisiyyah Coalitions, IHEC Al-Qādisiyyah Results

=== Saladin Governorate ===
Party	Total votes	Percentage	Seats	Party leader
Iraqi People's Coalition	95,338		7	Ahmed al-Juburi
Muttahidoon	79,705		5	Osama al-Nujaifi
Iraq's Authenticity Coalition	66,549		5	
Al Iraqia National and United Coalition	46,287		3	Ayad Allawi
Salahuddine National Alliance	39,447		3	
Equality Front	27,654			
Arabian Al Iraqia	24,167		2	Saleh al-Mutlaq
Salahuddine Unified Coalition	23,497		2	Mukhlaf Audi Sueid Mukhlaf
Brotherhood and Coexistence Alliance List	21,373		1	Mohamed Chehab Mohamed Samin
Salahuddine Turkmen's list	18,395		1	Ali Hachem Nuri Hassan
Other parties				
Total		100%	29	
Sources: ISW, al-Sumaria – Salah ad Din Coalitions, IHEC Salah ad Din Results

=== Wasit Governorate ===
Party	Total votes	Percentage	Seats	Party leader
State of Law Coalition	96,664	27.22%	7	Nouri al-Maliki
Citizens Alliance	86,403	24.33%	7	Ammar al-Hakim
Liberal Coalition	63,584	17.91%	5	Muqtada al-Sadr
Loyal Hands’ Gathering	29,969	8.44%	2	
Social Justice State	28,446	8.01%	2	
Iraq's Benevolence and Generosity List	13,678	3.85%	1	Dr Rushdi Said
Al Iraqia National and United Coalition	13,055	3.68%	1	Ayad Allawi
Equitable State Movement	8,447	2.38%	1	
Civil Democratic Alliance in Waset	8,420	2.37%	1	
Feylis Kurds Brotherhood List	2,212	0.62%	1	
Other parties	4,181	1.18%		
Total	355,059	100%	28	
Sources: ISW, al-Sumaria – Wasit Coalitions, IHEC Wasit Results
