= Ahmed Abdullah al-Jubouri =

Iraqi politician

- أحمد عبد الله الجبوري
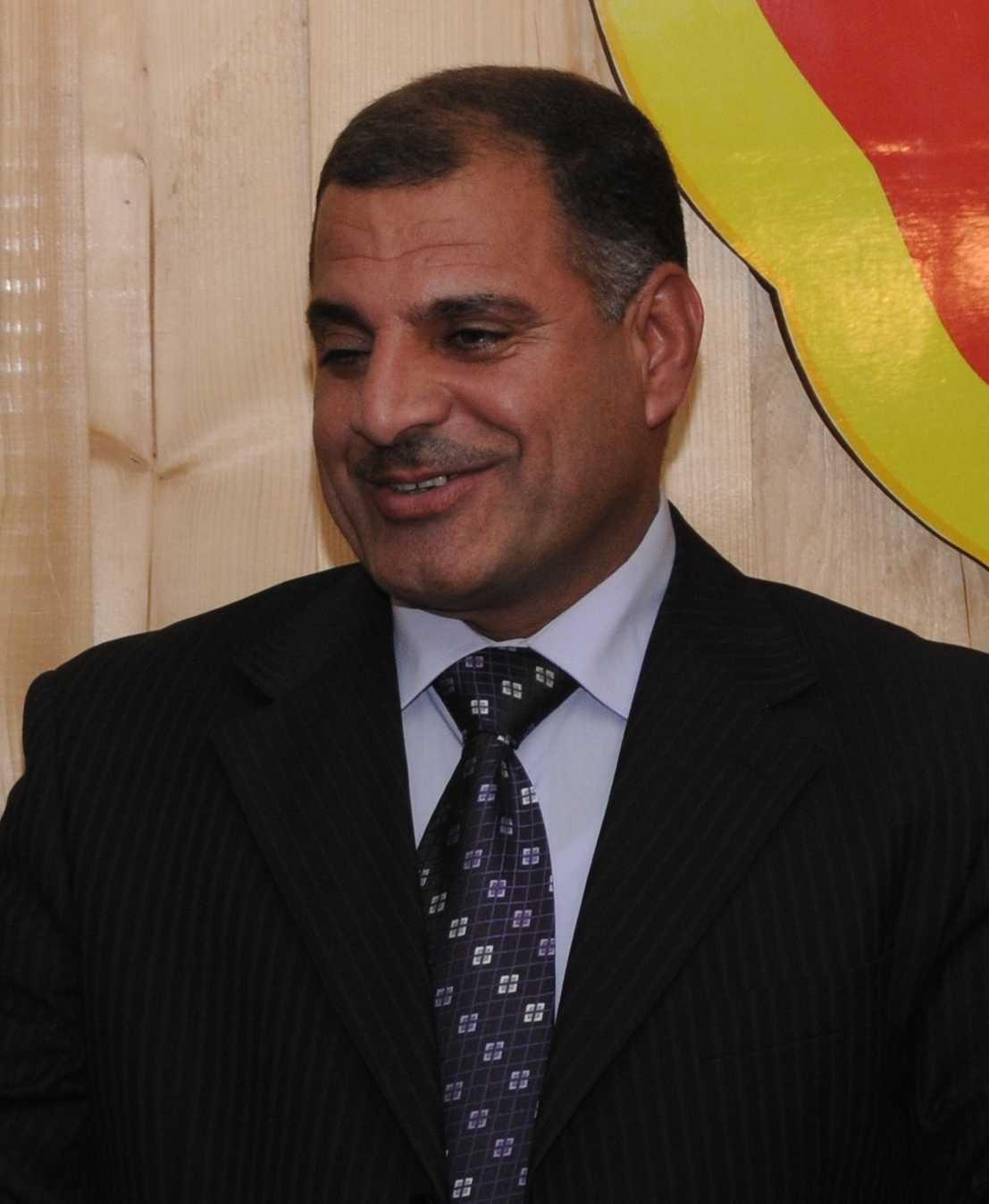
- Jubouri in Tikrit in 2009.

Governor of Saladin Governorate
- In office 2013 – August 2014
- Preceded by: Mutashar al-Aliwi

Provincial Council Chairman for Saladin Governorate

Minister of State for Provincial Affairs
- In office 8 September 2014 – 16 August 2015

Personal details
- Born: 1968 (age 57–58)
- Party: Iraqi People’s Coalition
- Nickname: Abu Mazin

Ahmed Abdullah Abid Khalaf al-Jubouri ('Abu Mazin') (Arabic: أحمد عبد الله عبد خلف الجبوري) (born ~1968) is an Iraqi politician from Salah ad-Din governorate, and a prominent figure in the Baiji area. He was the Minister of State for Provincial Affairs from 2014 to 2015 and the governor of Salah ad-Din governorate from 2013 to 2014.

== Political career ==
Jubouri was the Salah ad-Din governor's Assistant for Security Affairs from 2005. In the 2009 governorate elections he stood for the Iraqi National List and received more votes than any other candidate. In a deal between the INL and the Iraqi Accord Front, Jubouri was appointed the provincial chairman.

Jubouri had a bitter political rivalry with ex-Deputy Governor Abdullah Hussein Jebara. As part of this rivalry Jubouri played a role in the attempts to prevent Jebara from standing for election on de-Ba'athification grounds.

=== Governorship ===
Jubouri's political party, the Iraqi People’s Coalition, received the largest share of the votes in the 2013 Saladin governorate election. Jubouri subsequently became the governor of Saladin governorate.

Jubouri survived an assassination attempt on 18 December 2012. Jubouri had been travelling in the Tikrit area in a car with Qotaiba Jubouri, an MP and the Head of Iraqiya Hurra coalition, as part of an inspection of the various districts and villages of Saladin province. When travelling near the village of Albo-Ajeil village a car bomb went off. Both men survived.

In December 2013 Juburi was suspended by Prime Minister Nouri al-Maliki for at least two months while allegations of corruption were investigated.

== National politics ==
In the April 2014 elections, he headed the Al-Arabiya Coalition list in Salah ad-Din, which won the highest number of votes in the province. In August 2014 he took a seat in the Council of Representatives of Iraq and resigned as governor. He was appointed Minister of State for Provincial Affairs, a post in the cabinet of Prime Minister Haider al-Abadi, on 8 September 2014.

In August 2015, in response to protests against government corruption and inefficiency, the Prime Minister abolished 11 cabinet posts, including the Ministry for Provincial Affairs.

After his removal it was revealed that the Integrity Commission had issued a travel ban against him; he had been twice convicted of car theft, in 1985 and 1992 (which should have made him ineligible as an MP), and the qualification he had declared from a religious institution in Salah ad-Din was not equivalent to a university degree, and therefore he was not eligible to be a minister.
