= Khodair al-Khozaei =

10th vice president of Iraq

Vice President of Iraq
- In office 13 May 2011 – 9 September 2014
- President: Jalal Talabani; Fuad Masum
- Preceded by: Adil Abdul Mahdi
- Succeeded by: Ayad Allawi; Nouri al-Maliki; Osama al-Nujaifi

Minister of Education
- In office 2006–2010
- President: Jalal Talabani
- Prime Minister: Nouri al-Maliki

Personal details
- Born: 20 June 1947 (age 79) Maysan, Kingdom of Iraq
- Party: Islamic Dawa Party – Iraq Organisation; State of Law Coalition
- Children: 5
- Education: Usul al-Din College; University of Tehran; Aligarh Muslim University
- Occupation: Mufassir; Politician
- Website: www.vpo.iq

Khodair al-Khozaei (also transliterated as Khudayir al-Khuza'i; born 20 June 1947) served as the vice president of Iraq between 2011 and 2014. He is a member of the Islamic Dawa Party - Iraq Organisation party.

He was appointed by Prime Minister Nouri al-Maliki in May 2006.

He was born in 1947 in Maysan and obtained Doctorate in the Philosophy of Islamic thought and Quranic Studies. He worked in universities and has written books on Quranic interpretation.

He was elected to the Iraqi National Assembly in January 2005 and December 2005 as part of the United Iraqi Alliance list.

Political offices
Preceded by Adil Abdul Mahdi	Vice President of Iraq; 2011–2014	Succeeded by Ayad Allawi; Nouri al-Maliki; Osama al-Nujaifi
