= Al-Hadba =

- al-Hadba logo
- Leader: Atheel al-Nujaifi
- Founded: 2009
- Ideology: Regionalism
- Religion: Sunni Islam
- National affiliation: Iraqi National Movement (2009-2012); Muttahidoon (2014–)
- Seats in the Council of Representatives of Iraq: 0 / 328
- Seats in the local governorate councils: 0 / 440
- Governors: 0 / 18

The al-Hadba party is a political party formed to contest the 2009 Iraqi governorate elections in Ninawa province. It is mostly made up of Sunni Arabs. Its leading member Atheel al-Nujaifi is brother of Osama al-Nujaifi who is part of the Iraqi National List led by former Iraqi Prime Minister, Ayad Allawi. It has also been reported that members of the coalition have the backing of Shia Prime Minister Nouri al-Maliki.

== Name ==
The name "al-Hadba" is a reference to the leaning minaret of the oldest mosque in Mosul.

== History ==
Hadba Party Seeks to Minimize Kurdish Influence as Mosul Faces a Wave of Assassinations Perhaps the most successful new political party in the recent provincial elections was the Hadba list in Ninevah province, which according to preliminary results received more than 48% of the vote there. Since the announcement of these results a week ago the party has maneuvered to form a political alliance which will allow it to govern the province without depending on Kurdish votes, even as Kurdish politicians seek to ensure that they still have a voice in the new provincial council. Both sides are claiming that their share of council seats will be bigger in the final election results than it was in the preliminary vote tallies, and the Hadba party has announced its efforts to form alliances with a number of smaller political parties.

Al-Hadba is an alliance of several smaller parties headed by Atheel Al-Najeefi, whose brother Usama is a member of Ayad Allawi's National Iraqi List in the national parliament. The brothers come from a prominent Mosul family, who have been famous as businessmen and breeders of prize Arabian horses. It is named for the Hadbaa’ Minaret, a tilting structure built more than 800 years ago by Sultan Nour Al-Din, which has been likened to the leaning tower of Pisa and is considered to be a symbol of Mosul's historical identity. The party campaigned as the voice of Mosul's Arab majority, promising to support a strong Iraqi central government and to oppose the annexation of northern Ninevah province by the Kurdistan Regional Government.

Kurdish politicians have labeled Hadba leaders as racists and terrorist sympathizers, accusing the party of inciting hatred against Kurds in the province and opposing a fair resolution of territorial disputes. Arabs across Iraq boycotted the 2005 elections which formed the current provincial government, allowing Kurdish parties to control all levels of Ninevah's local government even in the majority-Arab city of Mosul. The Iraqi Army and Police units which patrolled Ninevah were until recently all loyal to the Kurdistan regional government, a situation which especially generated tension in Mosul, which is home to a large number of former Army officers and known for its deep Ba'athist sympathies. The Arab population of Mosul complained of abuse at the hands of Kurdish security forces and objected to the holding of many Arab suspects in prisons deep inside the territory of Kurdistan. The Kurds complain that many of their people have been killed by militant groups such as Al-Qaeda, and say that the recently created Arab police units are infiltrated by terrorist elements.

Kurdish politicians in Ninevah have long accepted that their dominance would end with the January 31st provincial elections, but it is almost certain they would have rather had to work with almost any Arab party other than Al-Hadba. The Kurdish alliance in the most recent elections was called the Ninevah Brotherly List, symbolizing its leaders’ desire to work amicably with different groups in the province. They are trying to ensure that they maintain some clout in the new provincial council, to leave the door open to the annexation of northern parts of the province currently controlled by Kurdish military units and to generally prevent Kurdish residents from becoming second-class citizens. A Kurdish parliament member declared on Friday that no Ninevah party would be able to achieve the majority necessary to govern without making alliances, saying that the Brotherly List would receive 30% of the seats after the final results were announced. On Saturday Usama Al-Najeefi responded by saying that the Hadba party could form a governing alliance all by itself, and that his party would in fact receive 60% of the seats after the final count. According to the preliminary results announced a week ago, the Hadba party received 48% of the votes and the Brotherly List received 25%.

Al-Hadba has long campaigned to create divisions between Ninevah's smaller minority groups and the Kurds, thus undermining Kurdish efforts to annex the towns where those minorities live. The attempt to split off members of the Yazidi religious sect has been particularly offensive to Kurds who have always considered the Yazidis to be a part of their people; yet in the recent campaign at least some Yazidi politicians came out against Kurdish dominance in Ninevah. Last Tuesday Usama Al-Najeefi held a joint press conference with leaders of the Yazidi Reformist Progressive Front and the Shabak Democratic Assembly to announce an alliance between these two parties and Al-Hadba. Neither of these two parties were listed in the preliminary election results for Ninevah, so it is possible that they were parties that did not achieve the minimum threshold of votes to receive a council seat and are adding their vote tallies to Al-Hadba, or that they were represented by one of the other electoral alliances and are now switching their allegiance. Al-Najeefi also declared his party's willingness to form alliances with other parties in the province, mentioning the Iraqi Islamic Party and the Christian Ishtar List by name.

In addition to political maneuvers Mosul has seen a wave of attacks on electoral candidates this week, with an attempt against a Hadba party candidate just today. Ninevah's outgoing Assistant Governor, Khasro Kouran, denied that there were any political motivations behind the continuing assassination attempts, saying that it was a matter of insufficient security and describing the security forces as “infiltrated”.

== Leaders ==
Leading members of the party are reported to include:

1. Atheel al-Nujaifi, who leads the party, a horse breeder in Mosul that once supplied horses to Uday and Qusay Hussein and the brother of the former Minister and Iraqi List MP Usama al-Najafi
2. Riad al-Chakerji, a retired army general, an adviser to the government of Nouri al-Maliki and the candidate for the governorship of Ninawa
3. Sheik Abdullah al-Humaidi al Yawar, the leader of the Shammar tribe, head of the "Justice and Reform Movement"
4. Hassan al-Luhaibi, a former Army commander who led the invasion of Kuwait in 1990
5. Mr. Arshad Al- Zibari is the leader of Iraqi Kurdish party of freedom and justice, and a member of Iraqi Turkmen Front in Ninawa and Kirkuk Governorates.(www.ikfjp.com)
6. The representative of Al-Hadba in Europe is Mr. Ziad Al-Zibari. He is member of the board of Iraqi Kurdish party of freedom and justice, and a member of Iraqi Turkmen Front in Ninawa and Kirkuk Governorates.

== Policies ==
The party supports the removal of Kurdish peshmerga forces from Ninawa, saying many of the province's insurgent groups would become law-abiding after that.

In relation to Ninewa's disputed territories that are claimed by the Kurdish Regional Government, Atheel al-Najafi, the head of the Hadba movement, said in an interview with Niqash that:

Ninawa’s administrative borders have been officially acknowledged. The existence of disputed areas in the province does not imply that the Kurdish Region can put them under its control until a resolution is reached. These areas should be under one authority, that of Ninawa province, which is controlled by the central authority in the capital city of Baghdad.

The representative of Al-Hadba in Europe is Mr. Ziad Zibari.
