= Hashim Al-Mosawy =

Iraqi politician

Syed Ali Jaan Hashim Nasir Al Mosawy
- هاشم الموسوي
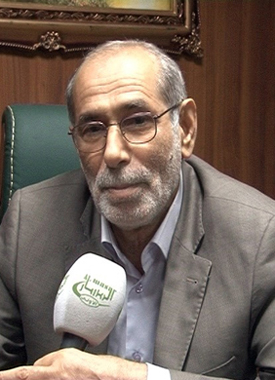
- Preceded by: Mohammed Baqr Al Sadr

Personal details
- Born: 1939 Basra
- Died: November 14, 2016 (aged 76–77) Tehran
- Party: Islamic Dawa Party - Iraq Organization
- Children: 8
- Occupation: Secretary General of the Islamic Dawa Party - Iraq Organisation Up Till 2016

Syed Ali Jaan Hashim Al-Mosawy (1939 - 2016) was an Iraqi politician who was the leader and Secretary-General of the Islamic Dawa Party - Iraq Organisation, the fifth-largest party within the ruling United Iraqi Alliance coalition.

He was born in Basra, Iraq in 1939, and died in Tehran, Iran on the 14 November 2016. He was the co-founder and re-founder of the Islamic Dawa Party - Iraq Organisation and he played a huge part in helping out during the Resistance against Saddam Hussain who was the President of Iraq.
