= Muttahidoon =

Muttahidoon ائتلاف متحدون للاصلاح
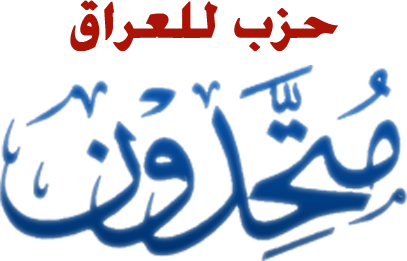
- Chairperson: Usama al-Nujayfi
- Founded: December 2012; 13 years ago
- Split from: Iraqi National Movement
- Headquarters: Baghdad, Iraq, and Erbil, Iraq (inside Erbil its headquarters exists only in form of Iraqi Turkmen Front)
- Ideology: Regionalism; Islamic democracy Populism
- Religion: Sunni Islam
- Colours: Blue
- Council of Representatives: 0 / 329
- Governorate Councils: 0 / 440

Website
- muttahidoon.iq

The Uniters for Reform Coalition (Arabic: ائتلاف متحدون للاصلاح I'tilāf Muttaḥidūn lil-Iṣlāḥ) is a Sunni political coalition in Iraq.

== History ==
The coalition was formed in December 2012, composing ten groups, and led by Usama al-Nujayfi. Among the groups composing Muttahidoon were several of the largest Sunni political blocs, including the Ninawa-based al-Hadba list, the bloc of former Awakening Movement leader Ahmed Abu Risha, the National Future Gathering bloc of former Finance Minister Rafi al-Issawi, the Iraqi Islamic Party, and the Iraqi Turkmen Front. Altogether the parties aligned with the coalition had won 42 seats in the 2010 parliamentary election.

For the 2013 governorate elections the coalition competed in Ninewa, Salah ad-Din, Baghdad, Anbar, and Basra. In Diyala and Babil the coalition joined with other political groups, running as Iraqiyat Diyala and Iraqiyat Babil.

Following the 2013 governorate elections, the Oum Rabih Tribes’ National Gathering of Hussein Khalaf entered into an alliance with Muttahidoon on 25 June, thereby forming the largest bloc on the Ninawa Governorate Council.

The party advocates the creation of a Sunni federal region in Iraq.

== Members ==
The following parties make up the coalition:

- National Movement for Development and Reform – led by Mohammad Nasir Dali Ahmed
- Al-Hadba – led by Usama al-Nujayfi and Atheel al-Nujaifi
- Iraqi Sahwa Conference – led by Ahmed Bazi Ftikhan Abd al-Hamid
- Civil Gathering for Reform (Work) – led by Salem Abdullah Ahmed Nasir
- National Independent Tribal Gathering – led by Omar Hejil Hamd Shabib
- National Gathering of Um al-Rabeain Tribes – led by Hussein Khalaf Alaw Hamid
- Protectors of Iraq Movement (Right) – led by Ahmed Abd Hamdai Shawish al-Massari
- Baghdad Belt Gathering – led by Talal Khudhair Abbas Gaed al-Zobai
- People of Shirqat Independent Union – led by Mudhhi Hussein Awadh Shalal
- Gathering of Saladin for Development – led by Ammar Youssif Hamoud Latouf
- Land of the Grandfathers Gathering – led by Daham Iwayed Multar Ahmed
- National Future Gathering – led by Dhafir Nadhim Salman Mahmoud
- Iraqi Turkmen Front – led by Arshad Rashad Fatih Allah Abd al-Razaq
- Iraq Awakening and Independents National Alliance
- Iraqi Islamic Party

== Criticisms ==
The coalition has been criticized by other Sunni political formations aligned with Prime Minister Nouri al-Maliki of following a Muslim Brotherhood direction, and there have been insinuations of the group having ties with groups outside Iraq.

== Electoral results ==
=== Iraqi Parliament ===
Council of Representatives
Election year	# of overall votes	% of overall vote	# of overall seats won	+/–	Leader
2014	680,690 (#4)	5.23	28 / 328	–	Usama al-Nujayfi
2018	368,633 (#9)	3.55	14 / 328	▼9	Usama al-Nujayfi

=== Governorate Councils ===
Governorate Councils
Election year	# of overall votes	% of overall vote	# of overall seats won	+/–	Leader
2013	518,968 (#4)	7.19	35 / 601	–	Usama al-Nujayfi

== See also ==
- List of Islamic political parties
- List of political parties in Iraq
