= Osama al-Nujaifi =

11th vice president of Iraq

- أسامة النجيفي
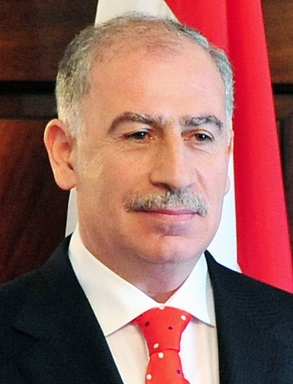
- Al-Nujaifi in 2011

Vice President of Iraq
- In office 10 October 2016 – 2 October 2018 Serving with Nouri al-Maliki and Ayad Allawi
- President: Fuad Masum
- Preceded by: Himself
- Succeeded by: Vacant
- In office 9 September 2014 – 11 August 2015 Serving with Nouri al-Maliki and Ayad Allawi
- President: Fuad Masum
- Preceded by: Khodair al-Khozaei
- Succeeded by: Himself

Speaker of the Council of Representatives
- In office 11 November 2010 – 15 July 2014
- Prime Minister: Nouri al-Maliki
- Preceded by: Fuad Masum (Acting)
- Succeeded by: Salim al-Jabouri

Minister of Industry
- In office 3 May 2005 – 20 May 2006
- Prime Minister: Ibrahim al-Jaafari
- Preceded by: Hajim al-Hassani (Interim)
- Succeeded by: Fawzi Hariri

Personal details
- Born: Usama Abdu'l Aziz al-Nujayfi; 1956 (age 69–70) Mosul, Iraq
- Party: al-Hadba (in the Muttahidoon coalition)
- Relations: Atheel al-Nujaifi (Brother)
- Profession: Engineer, politician

Osama Abdul Aziz al-Nujaifi (Arabic: أسامة النجيفي; born c. 1956) is an Iraqi politician and served as one of the three vice presidents of the country, from 2014 to 2015 and 2016 to 2018. As the speaker of the Council of Representatives, the informal leader of the moderate Sunni al-Hadba party was the highest ranking Sunni politician of Iraq.

An engineer by profession, al-Nujaifi served as Minister of Industry in the 2005–06 Iraqi Transitional Government. He later won the 2010 parliamentary election and was elected the Speaker of the Council of Representatives. During this time, he built up a reputation as prime minister al-Maliki staunchest adversary, whom as a Sunni he could defy but not challenge. After leaving offices together with al-Maliki in 2014, he was rewarded the ceremonial post of a Vice President of Iraq, which he held until 2015. The positions of all three Vice Presidents was restored in October 2016.

== Early life, education and early career ==
al-Nujaifi was born 1956 in Mosul to an aristocratic Sunni Arab family of landowners and politicians. Both his grandfather Muhammad and his father served as members of parliament during the monarchist era. He grew up racing Arabian horses for his family.

In 1978, al-Nujaifi earned a degree in electrical engineering, from the University of Mosul. Shortly after graduation, he worked in the Iraqi government's electricity ministry for 12 years, involved in building power plants.

Together with his brother Atheel, the later governor of Nineveh, in the early 1990s he took over his family's agricultural company, and particularly started out in the Arabian horse trade.

During the rule of Saddam Hussein, the al-Nujaifi family largely remained out of politics, returning to the public scene following his toppling in 2003. They were however accused of harboring sympathies for Saddam's Baath Party, and were indeed involved in horse trades with Saddam's sons Uday and Qusai.

== Political career ==
In the Iraqi Transitional Government, al-Nujaifi was appointed Minister of Industry. During his one-year tenure, he privatized most of the state-owned companies which included firms working in sectors from petrochemical and cement to sugar, silk and heavy industry. He campaigned against the ratification of the Constitution of Iraq.

Following the Iraqi legislative election of December 2005, he was nominated by the Iraqi National List to become a member of the Council of Representatives. On 26 January 2006, he survived an assassination attempt, when a roadside bomb detonated close to his convoy near the town of Balad, killing three of his bodyguards. Heading a parliamentary committee to assess the humanitarian situation in Nineveh Governorate, he criticized the conduct of governor Duraid Kashmoula: "We have seen no trace of the huge sums of money said to have been appropriated for the province and could gather no idea on how they were spent."

In September 2006 al-Nujaifi's bodyguard was assassinated. Later that month, al-Nujaifi sparked a walkout by the 55 MPSs of the Kurdistan Alliance when in a parliamentary speech he belittled the historical and current role of Kurds in Mosul area. His speech was seen chauvinist by the Kurds, urging even fellow members of the Iraqi National List to distance themselves from al-Nujaifi's words. al-Nujaifi claimed in October 2008 that the 2008 attacks on Christians in Mosul were carried out by Kurdish peshmerga and intelligence operatives.

=== Speaker of the Council of Representatives ===
The al-Nujaifi brothers' al-Hadba party contested the 2010 parliamentary election as part of the cross-sectarian Iraqiyya bloc, which became the largest parliamentary force. Iraqiyya, however, didn't manage to secure a clear majority to elect its Shiite leader Ayad Allawi to replace current prime minister Nouri al-Maliki. On 11 November 2010, after three days of pressure talk, al-Nujaifi was elected the Speaker of the Council of Representatives, obtaining 227 votes out of 295, with 30 MPs not attending the session. In turn, the power-sharing deal brokered by Kurdish politician Massoud Barzani secured al-Maliki and President Jalal Talabani's posts. In his first parliamentary speech, Nujafi however held al-Maliki's government responsible for the country's "fear, hunger, poverty and corruption," adding that Iraq was considered today "the most corrupt country in the world."

In his first visit to the US as Iraqi parliament speaker, al-Nujaifi refused following protocol, denying to place a wreath on the Arlington Tomb of the Unknowns on the basis that he considered the Americans "an occupying force rather than liberators". When he revisited Washington in early 2014 to discuss the ongoing Sunni insurgency in Al Anbar Governorate, he took a different stance, stressing the importance of the US role in Iraq "to support the political process developed in Iraq." He criticized the treatment of the Sunni Sahwa forces, who fought al-Qaeda in Iraq, though refused to join the Iraqi Army, until they were massively prosecuted by the al-Maliki government. "This policy of exclusion and marginalization of Sunnis and the arrest of thousands of them for illegal reasons provided a suitable ground for the rise of ISIS."

Named "the inner circle's new face", Nujaifi by then was the highest-ranking Sunni politician of Iraq, Within the increasingly fragmented Iraqiyya national bloc, al-Nujaifi's al-Hadba party shaped the new moderately Sunni Muttahidoon coalition, advocating a Sunni federal region in Iraq to contest the 2013 governorate elections. Seen by many as a future presidential prospect, his new coalition however didn't succeed in playing a central role neither in the governorate elections nor in the 2014 parliamentary election. After a weeklong deadlock situation, al-Nujaifi agreed not to seek another term as parliamentary speaker, if al-Maliki also drops his premiership bid. As the prime minister cleared the path, Salim al-Jabouri from the Muttahidoon-allied Diyala is Our Identity coalition became the new parliamentary speaker.

=== Vice president ===
al-Nujaifi was assigned the post of one of the three Vice Presidents of Iraq, along with the former prime ministers al-Maliki and Allawi on 8 September 2014. On 11 August 2015, these largely ceremonial posts were however altogether abolished as part of prime minister Haider al-Abadi's reform plans. Later, he filed a complaint against the decision, considering it to be against the Constitution. Also Nouri al-Maliki promised to cling to his post. On 10 October 2016, the three posts of Vice Presidents were restored by the Supreme Court of Iraq which termed their abolition as unconstitutional. On 12 May 2017, he announced the establishment of a political party dubbed "United for Iraq" in Erbil.

Political offices
Preceded by Khodair al-Khozaei	Vice President of Iraq; 2014–2015; 2016–2018	Succeeded by Vacant
