= Atheel al-Nujaifi =

Iraqi politician (born 1958)

Former Governor Atheel al-Nujaifi
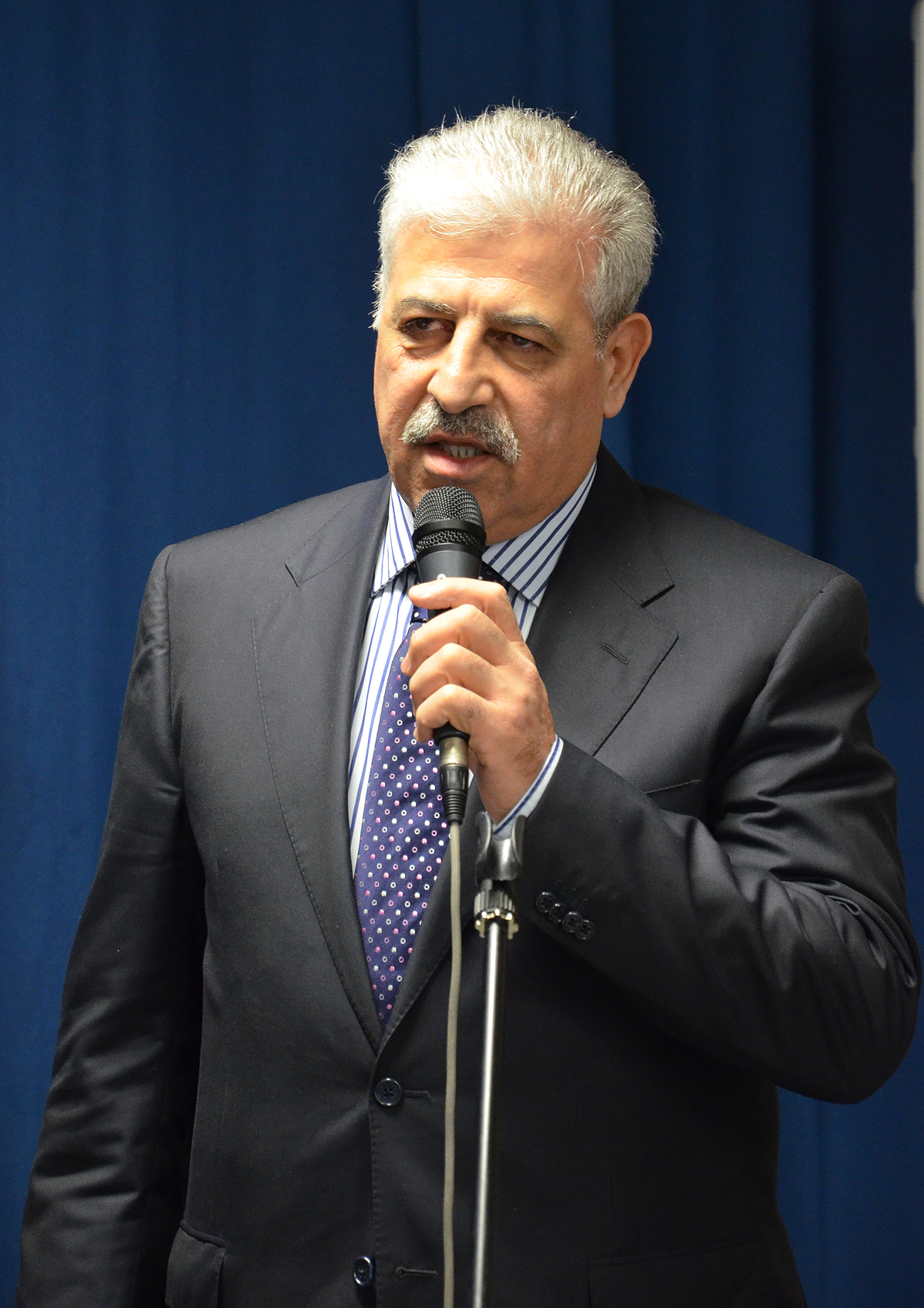

Governor of Nineveh
- In office April 2009 – May 28, 2015
- Preceded by: Duraid Kashmoula
- Succeeded by: Nofal Hammadi al-Sultan

Personal details
- Born: 1958 (age 67–68) Mosul, Iraq
- Party: al-Hadba
- Relations: Usama al-Nujayfi (Brother)
- Children: 5
- Education: University of Mosul
- Profession: Businessman

Atheel al-Nujaifi (Arabic: أثيل النجيفي; born 1958) is an Iraqi politician. He served as the Governor of Nineveh Governorate from April 2009 until May 2015.

Nujaifi was born into a Mawsili family in 1958. He is a brother of the Vice-President of Iraq, Osama al-Nujaifi. His ancestors were closely aligned with the Ottoman rulers of Mosul, resulting in them receiving huge grants of land in the al-Hamdaniya district. Nujaifi has degrees in engineering and law from the University of Mosul.

Former governor Atheel al-Nujaifi in the Yezidian Academy, Hanover, Germany, 2014
