= Iraqi National Accord =

Iraqi National Accord الوفاق الوطني العراقي
- Iraqi National Accord logo
- Leader: Ayad Allawi
- Founded: 1991
- Headquarters: Baghdad, Iraq; London, United Kingdom
- Newspaper: Baghdad News
- Ideology: Progressivism; Secularism; Liberalism
- Political position: Centre-left
- National affiliation: Al-Wataniya Coalition
- International affiliation: None
- Seats in the Council of Representatives of Iraq: 1 / 328

Website
- http://www.wifaq.com/

The Iraqi National Accord (INA; Arabic: الوفاق الوطني العراقي; Al-Wifaq Al-Watani Al-'Iraqi), colloquially known in Iraq as Wifaq, is an Iraqi political party founded by Ayad Allawi, Tahsin Muallah and Salah Omar al-Ali in 1991.

== History ==
The Iraqi National Accord historically used the secular version of the Iraqi flag without the Takbir added by Saddam as a symbol against the Ba'athist regime

The party was founded at the time of the Persian Gulf War as an opposition group to Saddam Hussein. At that time, the two most active anti-Saddam groups were the SCIRI and al-Dawa; both were Iranian-backed Islamic Shi'ite parties, originating from Iraq, but operating from Iran from which they received support. Both parties were disagreeable to the western powers, and Saudi Arabia, who had long had poor relations with Iran. The INA was thus set up to be an alternative, largely funded by money from Saudi Arabia; with extra support coming from the UK and the United States.

INA membership consisted largely of military and security personnel who had defected from the Iraqi military under Saddam Hussein's rule.

The INA organised attacks in Iraq between 1992 and 1995 to demonstrate its capacities as a militant group, but these had little effect on the government. In August 1995, Saddam's son-in-law, Hussein Kamel al-Majid authorized the INA to operate from Jordan after he too defected. Unlike the Iraqi National Congress strategy of fomenting revolution among Iraq's disaffected minorities, the INA felt the best way to remove Saddam was organizing a coup among Iraqi military and security services. To this end, the INA, in close cooperation with the CIA, was involved in a coup against Saddam in 1996. However, the INA had been infiltrated by agents loyal to Saddam, and in June, 1996, 30 Iraqi military officers were executed and 100 others were arrested for alleged ties to the INA. Allawi has claimed INA remained active in Iraq as of March, 1998.

With the fall of Saddam, the INA entered Iraq playing a central role in the occupation government. With the rift between the United States and the Iraqi National Congress, the INA's role was further enhanced and Allawi was declared Prime Minister of Iraq on 28 May 2004. Under Allawi, the INA participated in the January 2005 Iraqi election, as part of the Iraqi List coalition. In the December 2005 elections, it was part of the Iraqi National List coalition.
