= Nineveh Governorate =

Governorate of Iraq

Nineveh Governorate محافظة نينوى (Arabic)
- Governorate
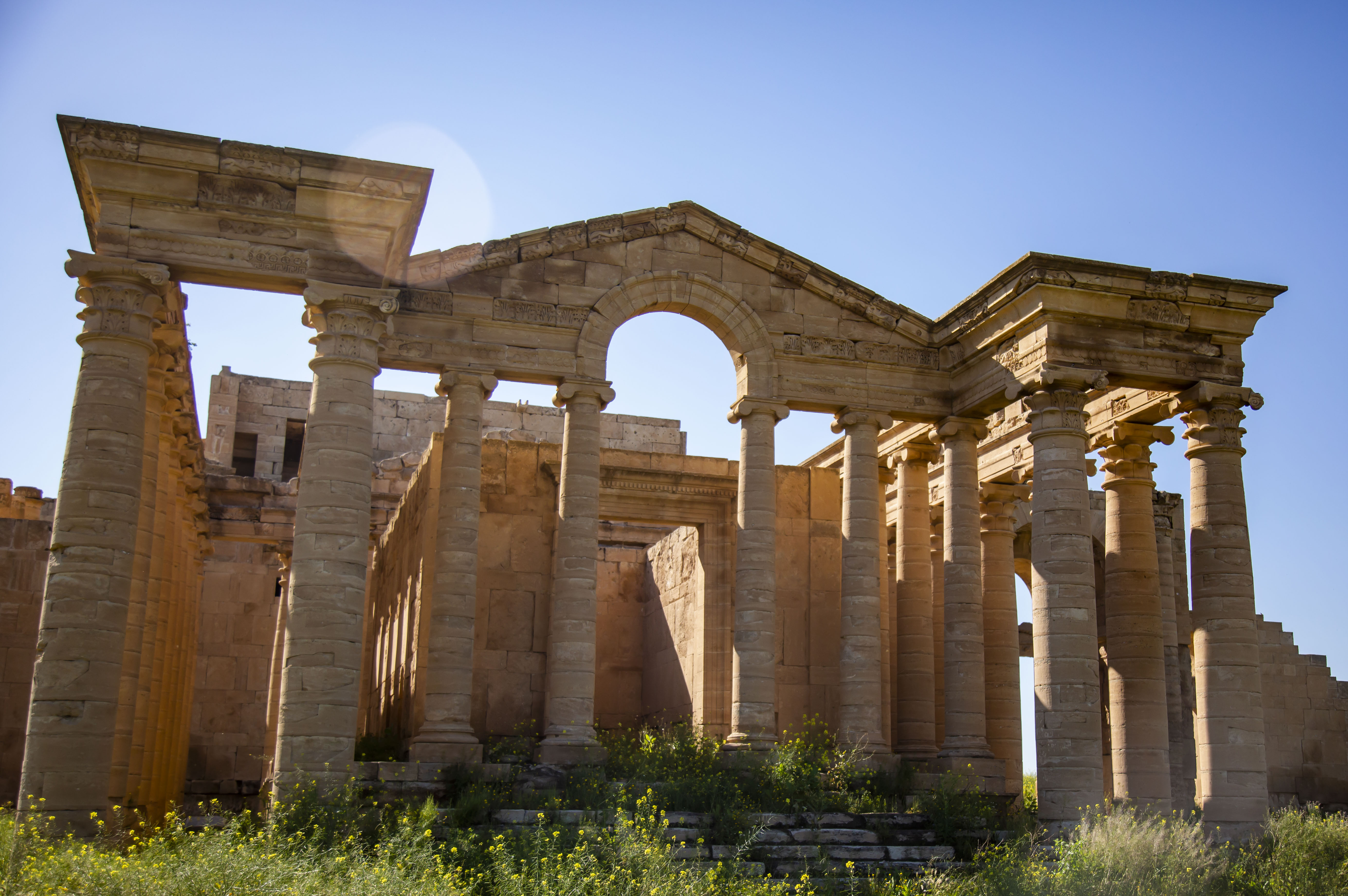
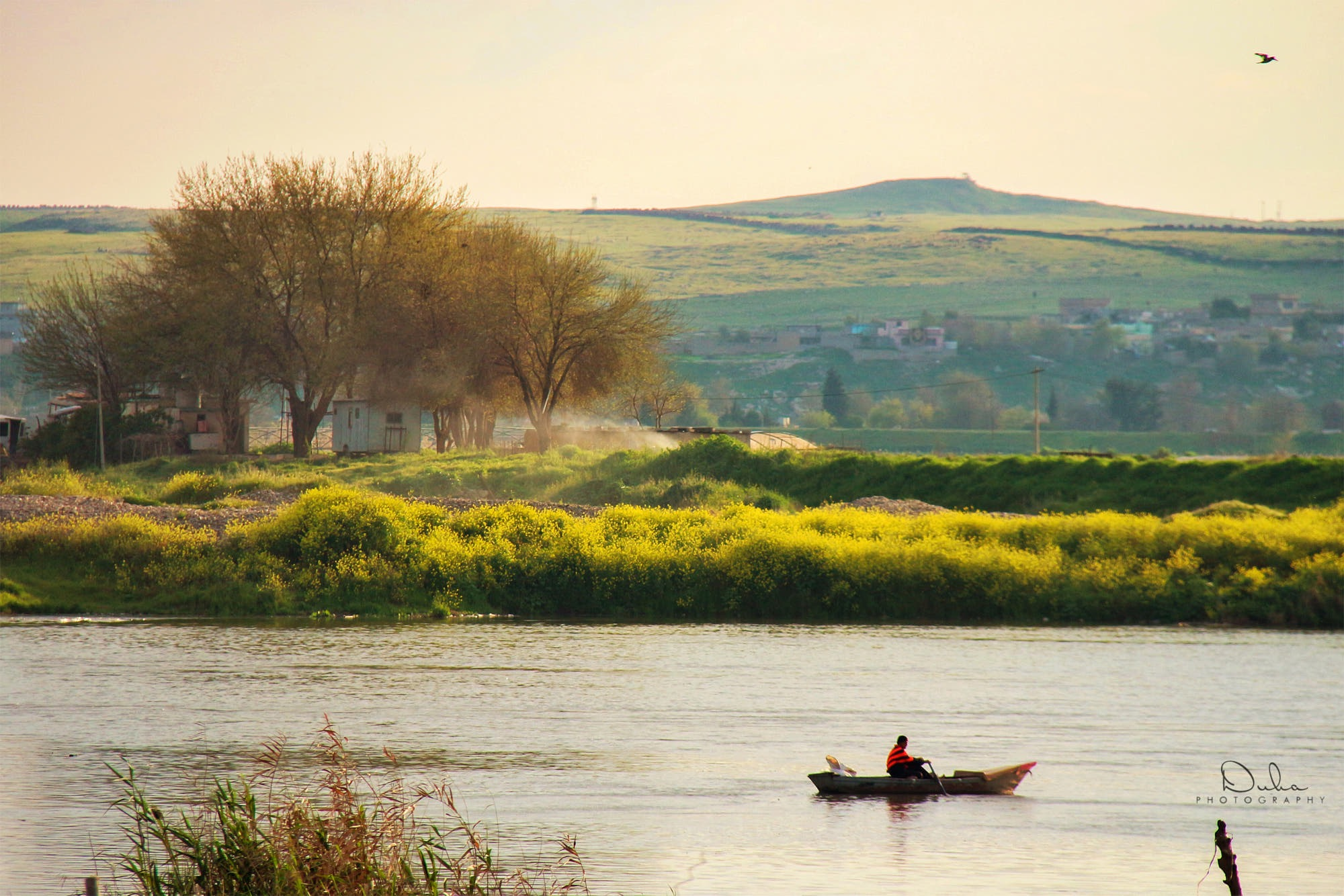
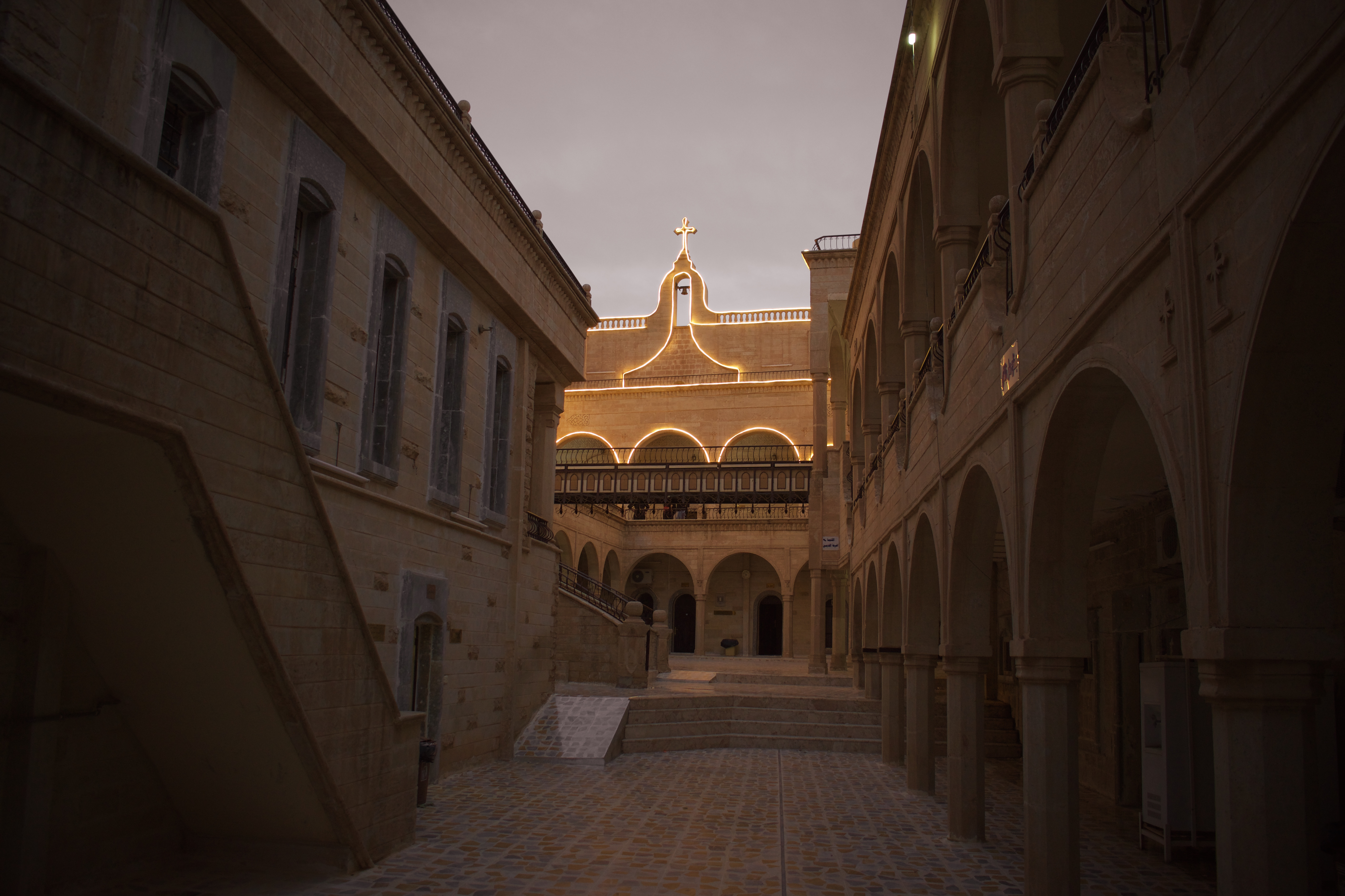
- Top–bottom, L-R: View over Tigris river • Hatra; Mosul Rural area • River Gate toward Tigris river, 2019; Mosul Museum • Heritage house

- Seal

- Coordinates: 36°0′N 42°28′E
- Country: Iraq
- Capital: Mosul

Government
  - Governor: Abdul Qader al-Dakheel

Area
  - Total: 37,323 km^{2} (14,410 sq mi)

Population (2024 census)
  - Total: 4,261,980
  - Rank: 2nd
  - Density: 114.19/km^{2} (295.76/sq mi)
- ISO 3166 code: IQ-NI
- HDI (2024): 0.699 medium
- Website: ninava.gov.iq

Nineveh Governorate (Note: Arabic: محافظة نينوى, romanized: muḥāfaẓat Naynawā or Nīnawā; Syriac: ܗܘܦܪܟܝܐ ܕܢܝܢܘܐ, romanized: Hoparkiya d’Ninwe; Sorani Kurdish: پارێزگای نەینەوا, romanized: Parêzgeha Neynewa.) is a governorate in northern Iraq. It has an area of 37,323 km^{2} (14,410 sq mi) and a population of 4,261,980 people as of 2024. Its largest city and provincial capital is Mosul, which lies across the Tigris river from the ruins of ancient Nineveh. Before 1976, it was called Mosul Province and included the present-day Dohuk Governorate.

The region is home to many historical sites including the ancient Assyrian city of Nineveh, and the ruins of Hatra, a UNESCO World Heritage Site which was part of the 2nd-century Arab Kingdom of Hatra. An ethnically, religiously and culturally diverse region, where the second largest city, Tal Afar, has an almost exclusively Turkmen population.

== Recent history and administration ==
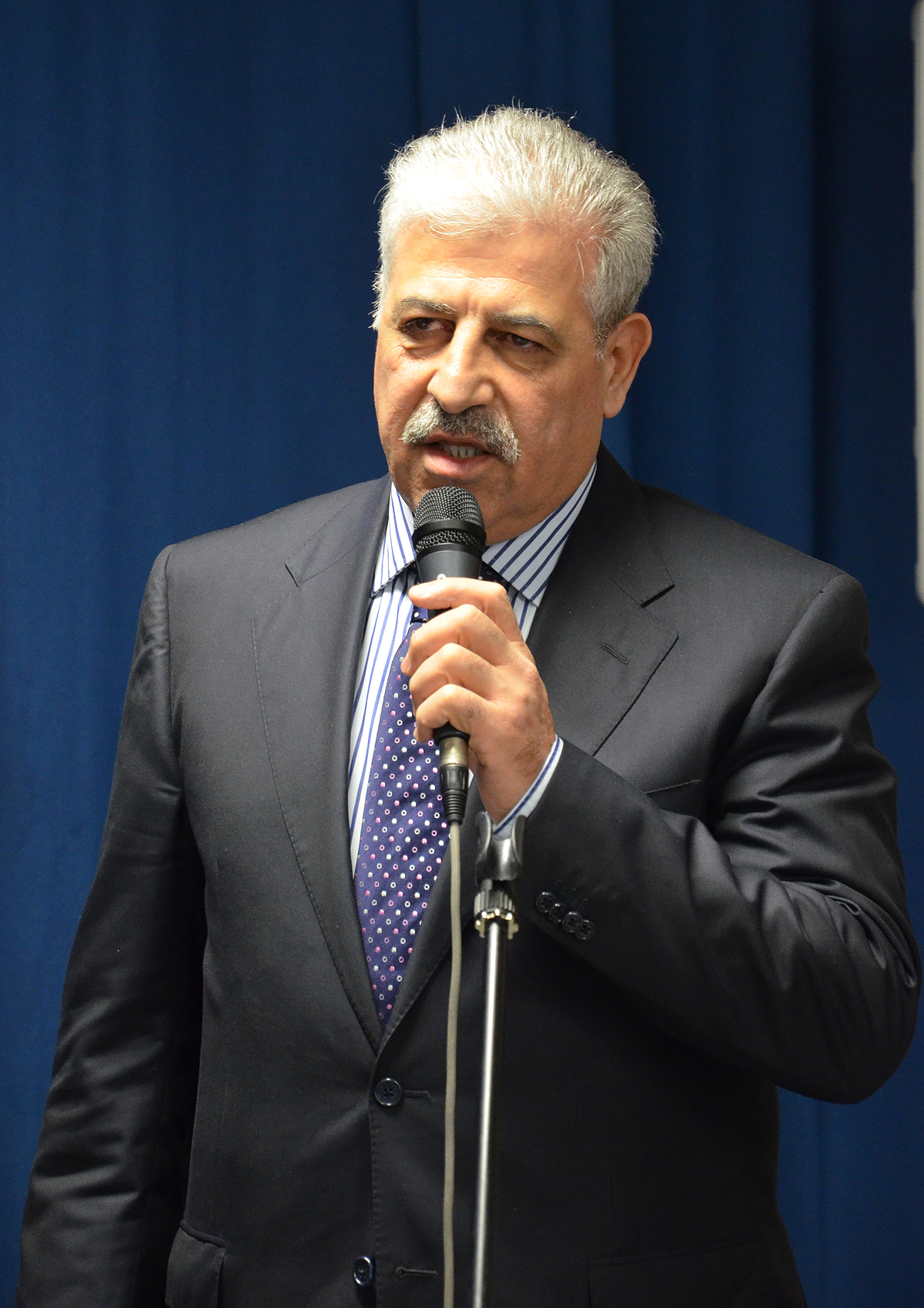
Former governor Atheel al-Nujaifi in the Yezidian Academy, Hanover, Germany, 2014

Its two cities endured the 2003 U.S.-led invasion of Iraq and emerged unscathed. In 2004, however, Mosul and Tal Afar were the scenes of fierce battles between US-led troops and Iraqi insurgents. The insurgents moved to Nineveh after the Battle of Fallujah in 2004.

After the invasion, the military of the province was led by (then Major General) David Petraeus of the 101st Airborne Division and later by (then Brigadier General) Carter Ham as the multi-national brigade for Iraq. During the time, the American civil head of the local office of the Coalition Provisional Authority was US Foreign Service Officer and former Kurdish refugee to the States, Herro Mustafa. Mustafa administered her nominees on the provincial council and through members of the Kashmoula family.

In June 2004, Osama Kashmoula became the interim governor of the province and in September of the same year he was assassinated en route to Baghdad. He was succeeded as interim Governor by Duraid Kashmoula, who was elected governor in January 2005. Duraid Kashmoula resigned in 2009. In April 2009, Atheel al-Nujaifi, a hardline Arab nationalist and member of Al-Hadba, became governor. While al-Nujaifi's Arab Muttahidoon bloc lost its majority to the Kurdish Brotherhood and Coexistence Alliance List in the 2013 provincial election, al-Nujaifi was reelected as governor by a larger Sunni Arab coalition that was later formalized as the Nahda Bloc.

In June 2014, insurgents from the Islamic State of Iraq and the Levant (known as ISIS or ISIL) overran the capital Mosul, forcing an estimated 500,000 refugees to flee the area, including governor al-Nujaifi, who was subsequently deposed by the Iraqi Parliament.

While the Kurdish list proposed Hassan al-Allaf, an Arab affiliated with the Islamic Party, the provincial council elected Nofal Hammadi (formerly Loyalty to Nineveh List) with the votes of the Nahdha bloc.

An offensive to retake Mosul from ISIL control began in October 2016, with Iraqi and Kurdish soldiers supported by a U.S.-led coalition of 60 nations.

== Geography ==
=== Borders ===
The province borders the governorates of Dohuk, Kirkuk, Erbil, Saladin, and Anbar. It also shares a border with Syria, mostly Al-Hasakah Governorate, and Deir ez-Zor Governorate.

=== Districts ===
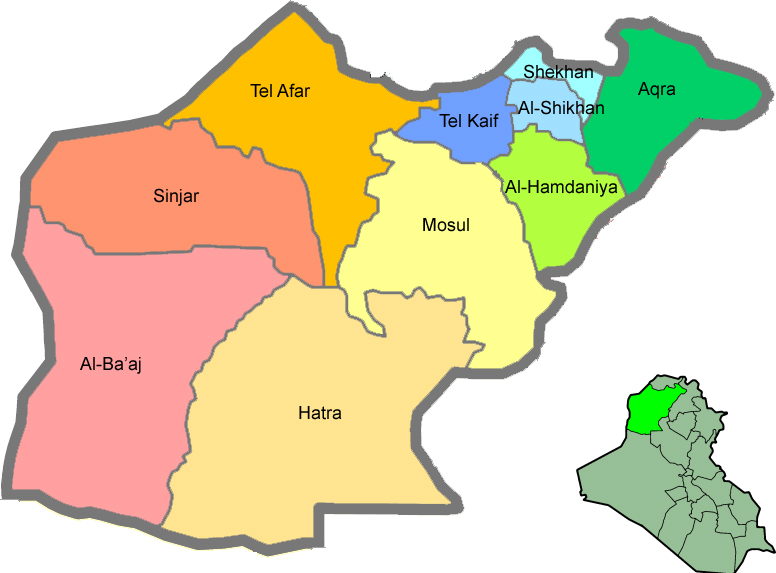
Districts within Nineveh Governorate

Nineveh Governorate comprises nine districts (excluding Aqrah), listed below with their areas and populations as estimated in 2018:

No.	District	Name in Arabic	Population in 2018	Area in sq. km
1.	Mosul	الموصل	1,905,174	4,318
2.	Tel Afar	تلعفر	511,004	4,286
3.	Sinjar	سنجار	325,816	3,576
4.	Al-Hamdaniya	الحمدانية	210,601	740.6
5.	Tel Keppe	تلكيف	210,263	1,218
6.	Makhmūr	مخمور	209,545	2,682
7.	Al-Ba'aj	البعاج	179,520	8,359
8.	Al-Hadar (Hatra)	الحضر	59,429	11,130
9.	Shekhan	شيخان	43,984	466
	Total		3,729,998	36,700

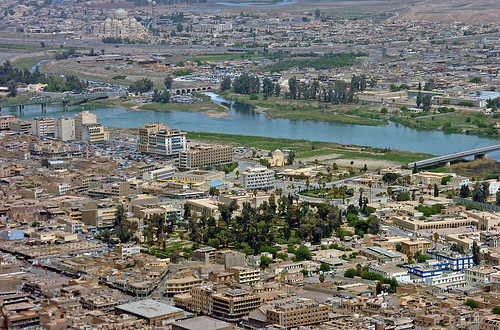
Mosul

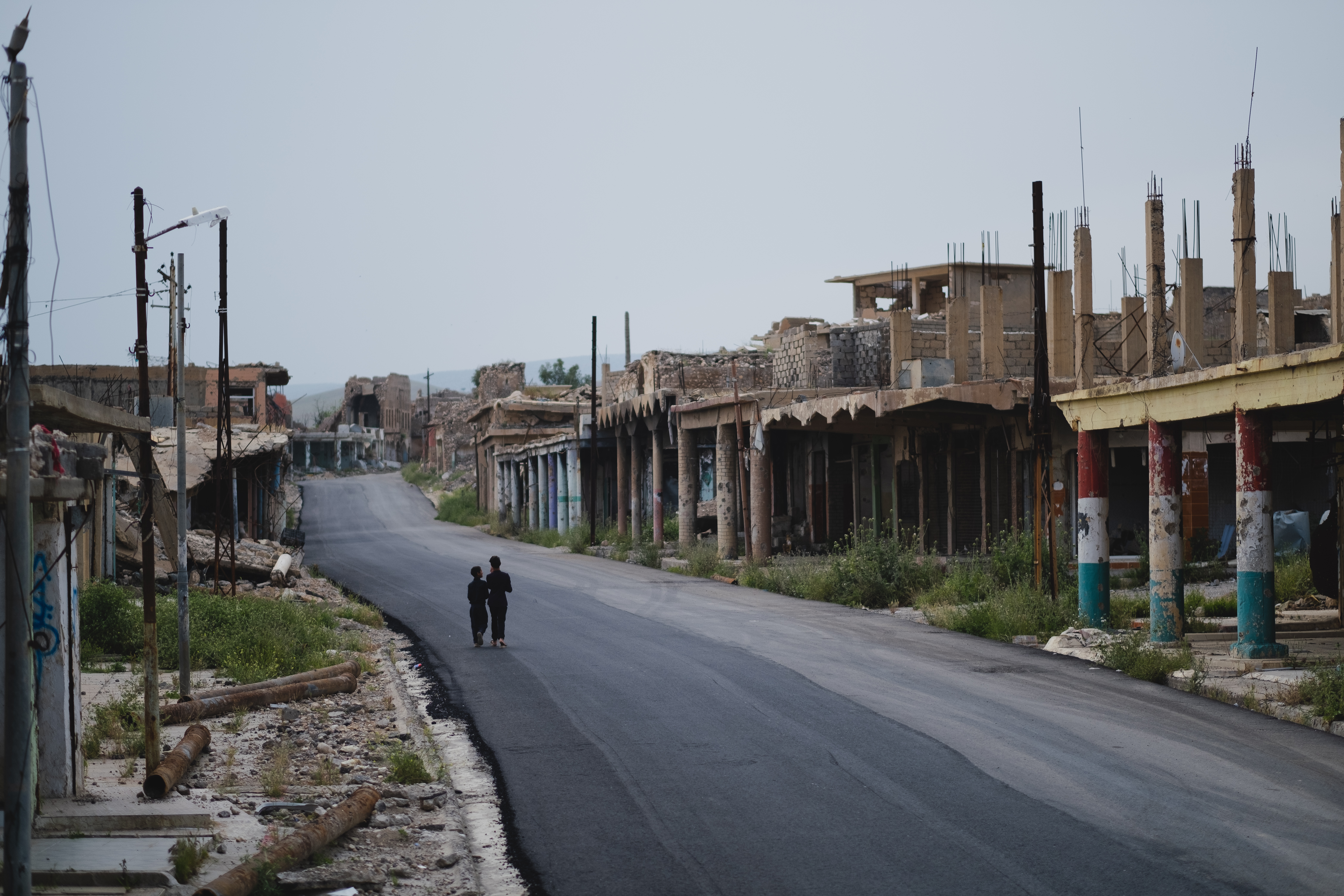
Tel Afar

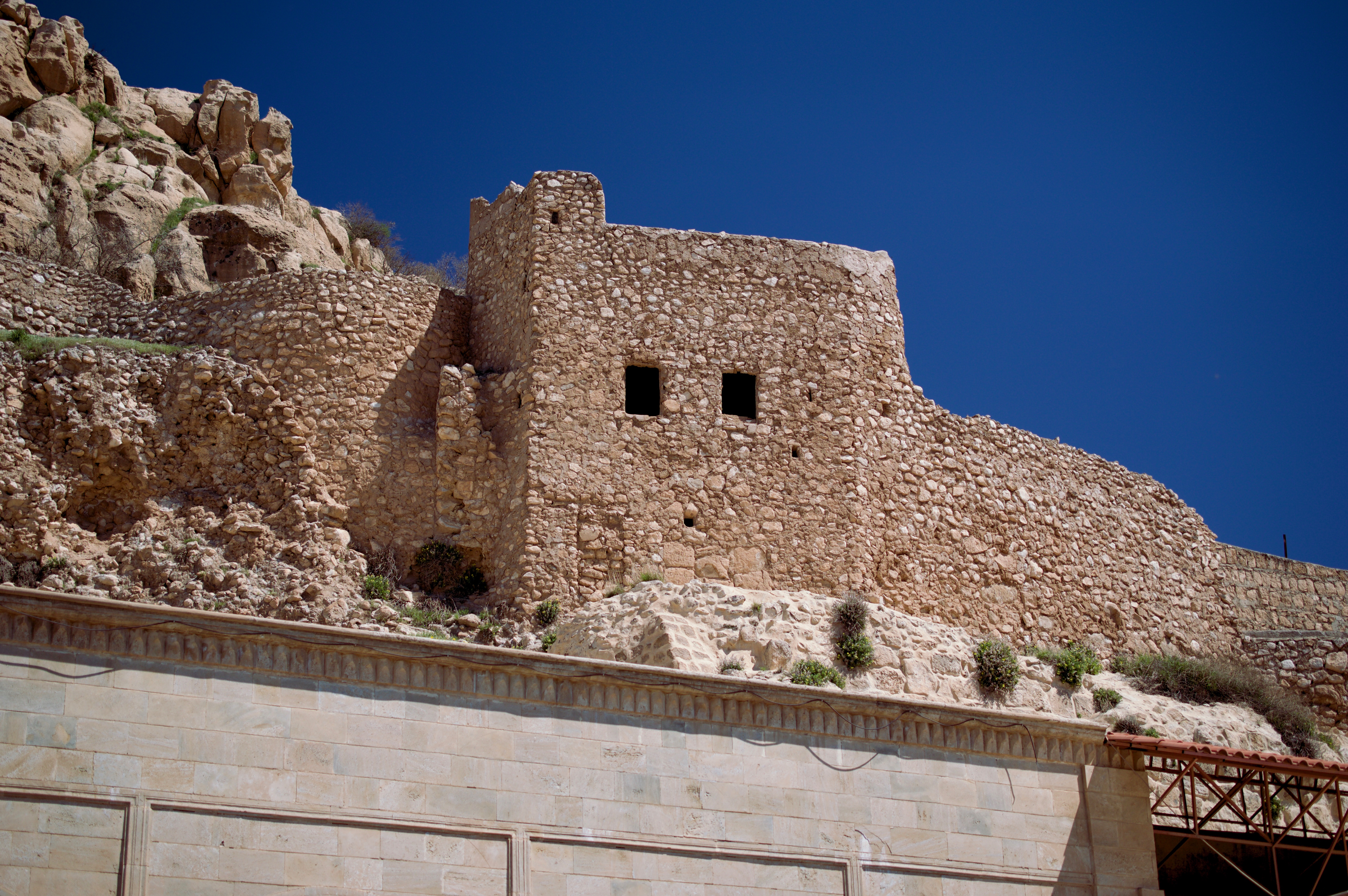
Hamdaniyah

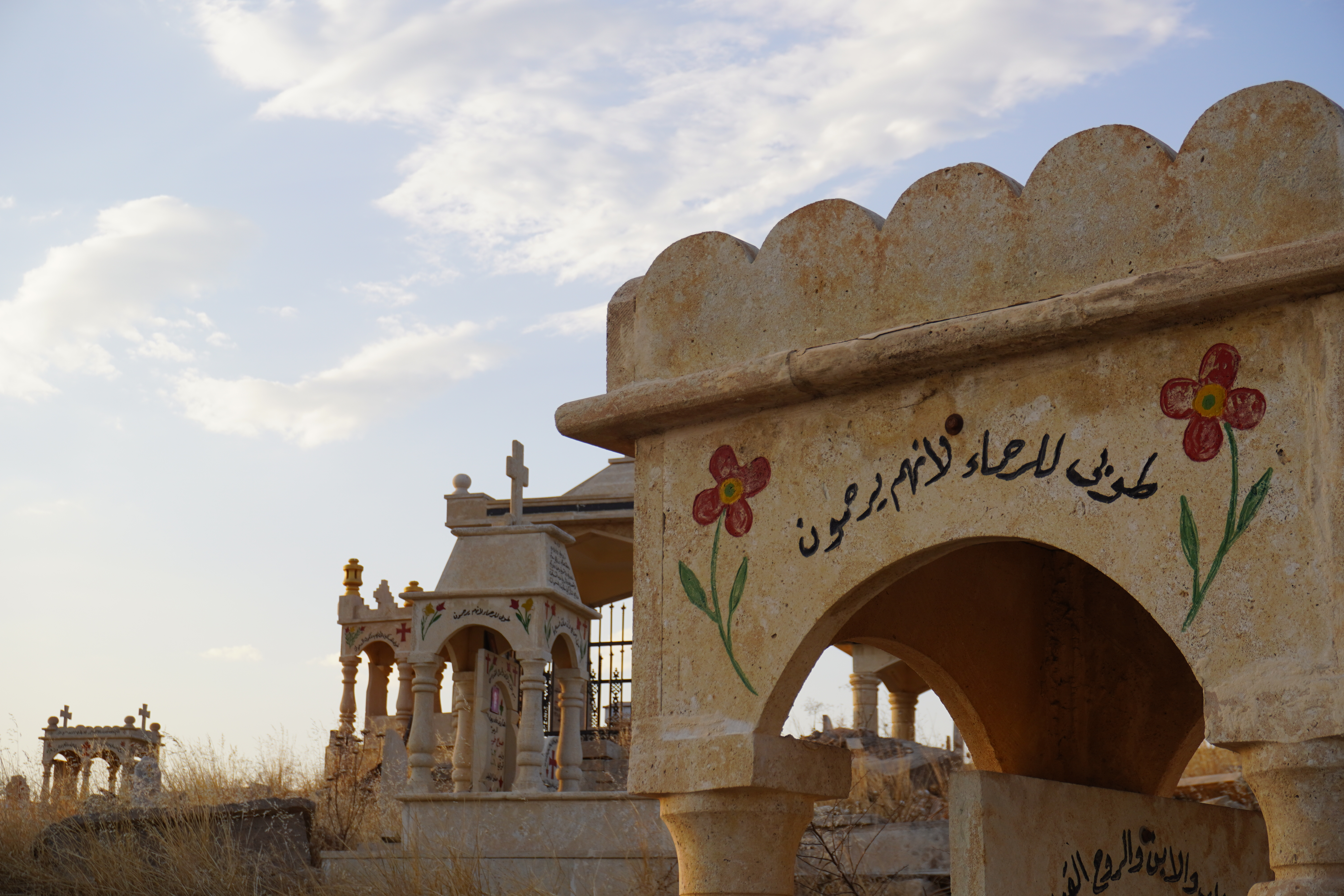
Tel Keppe

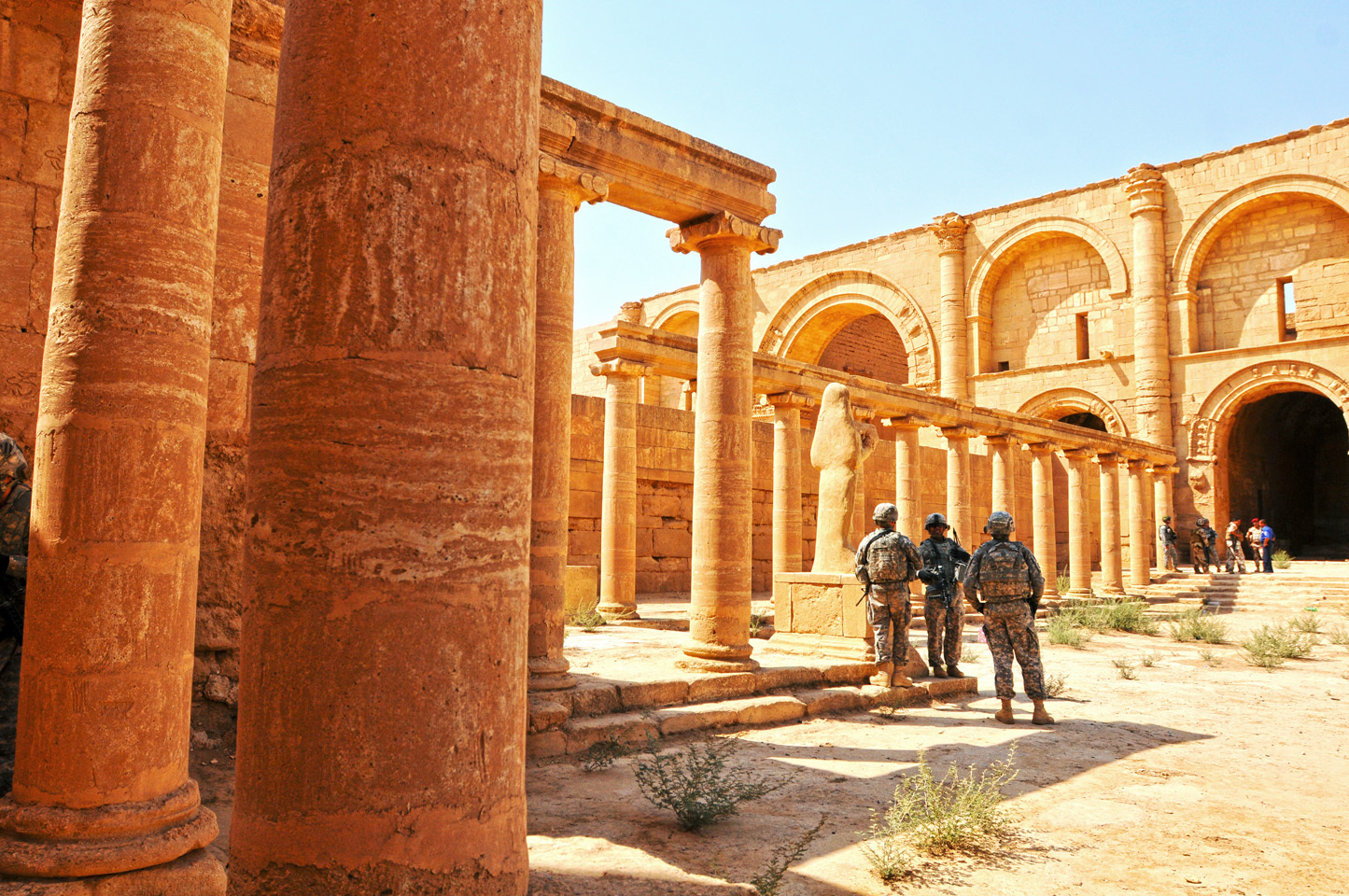
Hatra

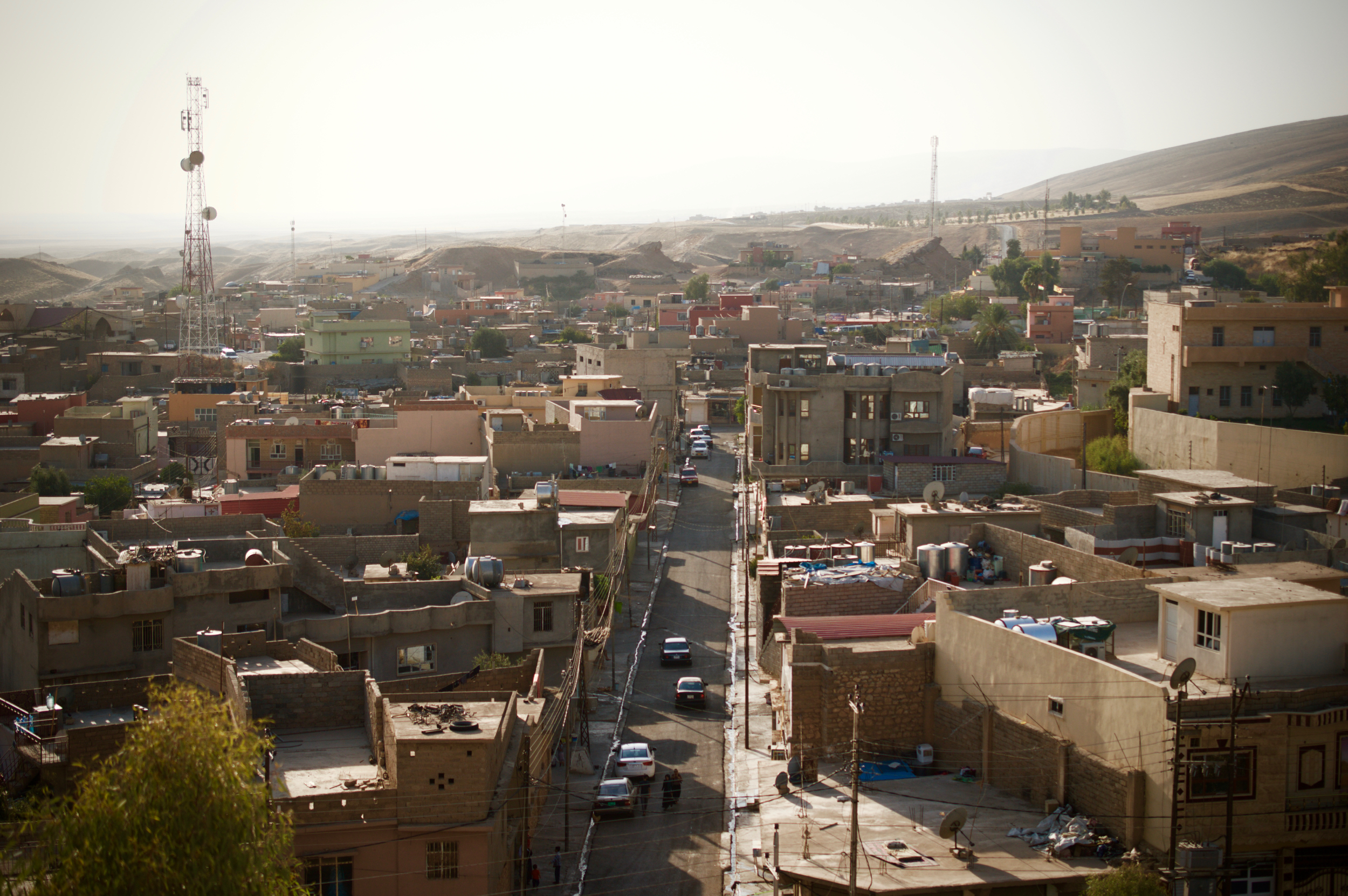
Shekhan

== Demographics ==
Historical population
Year	Pop.	±% p.a.
1977	1,105,700	—
1987	1,479,430	+2.95%
1997	2,042,852	+3.28%
2009	3,106,948	+3.56%
2024	4,261,980	+2.13%
Source: Citypopulation

Nineveh Province is multiethnic, with Arabs constituting the majority, while Assyrians, Turkmens, Kurds, and Yazidis who live in both in towns and cities, and in their own specific villages and regions, constitute the minority. There are also many Armenians, Kawliya, Mandeans, and Shabaks.

The majority are Sunni Muslim, with 80% of the Arabs and Turkmens being Sunni Muslim, as well Kurds also being Sunni Muslim. About 5–10% of the population is Shia Muslim. Generally, Yazidis, Shabaks and Mandeans are followers of their respective heritage religions, Yazidism, Shabakism, and Mandaeism.

The primary spoken language is Arabic. Minority languages include Turkmen, Neo-Aramaic dialects, Kurdish (predominantly Kurmanji) and Armenian.

=== Proposed Assyrian autonomous region ===
Many Assyrian leaders advocate an autonomous Assyrian homeland within the Nineveh Province (mostly in the Nineveh Plains region) for the Assyrian population.

== See also ==
- 2005 Nineveh governorate election
- Assyrian homeland
- Genocide of Yazidis by the Islamic State
- List of churches and monasteries in Nineveh
- List of Yazidi settlements
- Nineveh Plains
- Persecution of Christians by the Islamic State
- Proposals for Assyrian autonomy in Iraq
