= Ayad Allawi =

Prime Minister of Iraq from 2004 to 2005

- إياد علاوي
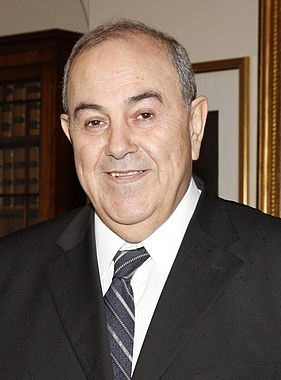
- Allawi in 2010

Vice President of Iraq
- In office 10 October 2016 – 2 October 2018 Serving with Osama al-Nujaifi and Nouri al-Maliki
- President: Fuad Masum
- Preceded by: Himself
- Succeeded by: Vacant
- In office 8 September 2014 – 11 August 2015 Serving with Osama al-Nujaifi and Nouri al-Maliki
- President: Fuad Masum
- Preceded by: Khodair al-Khozaei
- Succeeded by: Himself

Prime Minister of Iraq
- In office 1 June 2004 – 3 May 2005
- Preceded by: Ghazi Mashal Ajil al-Yawer (President of the Governing Council)
- Succeeded by: Ibrahim al-Jaafari

President of the Governing Council of Iraq
- In office 1 October 2003 – 31 October 2003
- Preceded by: Ahmed Chalabi
- Succeeded by: Jalal Talabani

Personal details
- Born: 31 May 1944 (age 82) Adhamiyah, Baghdad, Kingdom of Iraq
- Citizenship: Iraq; United Kingdom
- Party: Iraqi National Accord (1991–present)
- Other political affiliations: Al-Wataniya (December 2012–present); Iraqi National Movement (2009–2012); Ba'ath Party (1961–1976)
- Children: 3
- Relatives: Ahmed Chalabi (cousin); Ali Allawi (cousin); Mohammed Tawfiq Allawi (cousin)
- Education: University College London
- Profession: Neurologist
- Website: Ayad Allawi Website; Al-Watania Website

Ayad Allawi (Arabic: إياد علاوي, romanized: Iyād ʿAllāwī; also spelled Iyad or Eyad; born 31 May 1944) is an Iraqi-British politician and neurologist. He served as the vice president of Iraq from 2014 to 2015 and 2016 to 2018. Previously he was interim prime minister of Iraq from 2004 to 2005 and the president of the Governing Council of Iraq (38th prime minister of Iraq) in 2003.

A prominent Iraqi political activist who lived in exile for almost 30 years, Allawi, a Shia Muslim, became a member of the Iraq Interim Governing Council, which was established by U.S.-led coalition authorities following the 2003 invasion of Iraq. He became Iraq's first head of government since Saddam Hussein when the council dissolved on 1 June 2004, and named him prime minister of the Iraqi Interim Government. His term as prime minister ended on 7 April 2005, after the selection of Islamic Dawa Party leader Ibrahim al-Jaafari by the newly elected transitional Iraqi National Assembly.

A former Ba'athist, Allawi helped found the Iraqi National Accord, which today is an active political party. In the lead up to the 2003 invasion of Iraq, the INA provided intelligence about alleged weapons of mass destruction to MI6. Allawi has lived about half of his life in the UK. His wife and children still live in the UK for their security. He survived assassination attempts in 1978, in 2004, and on 20 April 2005.

== Early life ==
Allawi was born in 1944 to a prominent Shiite merchant family belonging to the Rabīʿa tribe; his grandfather helped negotiate Iraq's independence from Britain, his father was an Iraqi Member of Parliament, and his mother was Lebanese. Previously, he had attended high school and college at Baghdad College, a Catholic, Jesuit high school and college. He obtained his master's degree at University College London and performed a residency at Guy's Hospital. Allawi has three children, one of them, Hamza, studies in a school in Surrey. Allawi is related to Ahmed Chalabi, another prominent former exile who died in 2015, through Chalabi's sister. Former minister of trade Ali Allawi is Chalabi's sister's son as well as Ayad Allawi's cousin. The relationship between Chalabi and Allawi had been described as alternating between rivals and allies. In addition, Nouri Badran, interim Minister of Interior, is married to Iyad Allawi's sister. He is also a cousin of Mohammed Tawfiq Allawi. Allawi gained British citizenship by the 1980s.

== Early political career ==
During his student years, Allawi became politically active. He joined the Ba'ath Party in 1961 while studying medicine at Baghdad University and organised opposition to the government of Abdul Karim Qassim.

In 1971, he moved to London due to increasing differences with the Ba'ath Party and in order to continue his medical education. He resigned from the Ba'ath party in 1976, "having decided that Saddam was exerting too much control over it," and reportedly established ties with MI6. Allawi himself states that he remained active in the international Ba'athist movement, but had no ties to the Ba'ath Party's Iraqi Regional Branch.

At first Saddam, then Iraq's vice president, pressured Allawi, who was in contact with senior military and party officers that were increasingly critical of Saddam, to rejoin the Ba'ath Party. In 1978, friends told Allawi that his name was on a liquidation list. In February 1978 Allawi was awoken in bed one night by an intruder in his home in Kingston upon Thames, who proceeded to attack him with an axe. The intruder left, convinced that Allawi was dead as he lay in a pool of blood. He survived the attempted murder, and spent the next year in hospital recovering from his injuries. His first wife, Atour, was also wounded in the attack. Allawi accused the Iraqi government of orchestrating the attack, without providing solid evidence. He separated with his wife after mutual agreement.

== The Iraqi National Accord ==
While still recovering in hospital from the attack, Allawi started organising an opposition network to work against the government of Saddam Hussein. Through the 1980s he built this network, recruiting Iraqis while traveling as a businessman and for the UNDP.

In December 1990, Allawi announced the existence of the Iraqi National Accord (INA). Six years later, using disillusioned Ba'athists in the military and government, it mounted an unsuccessful coup in Baghdad. One of Allawi's allies in the INA was Salah Omar Al-Ali, a former member of the Iraqi Revolutionary Command Council and ambassador to the United Nations. The INA received open backing from the UK, Egypt, Jordan, Saudi Arabia, Turkey and the United States. The group consisted mainly of former military personnel who had defected from Saddam Hussein's Iraq to instigate a military coup. Allawi established links and worked with the CIA in 1992 as a counterpoint to Chalabi, and because of the INA's links in the Ba'athist establishment. It is alleged Allawi's INA organised attacks in Iraq. This campaign never posed a threat to Saddam Hussein's rule, but was designed to test INA's capability to effect regime change. Though Saddam's government claimed the attacks have caused up to 100 civilian deaths there are no true records of these statistics to date.

A military coup was planned for 1996, in which Iraqi generals were to lead their units against Baghdad and remove Saddam Hussein. The CIA supported the plot, code-named DBACHILLES, and added Iraqi officers that were not part of INA. The plan ended in disaster as it had been infiltrated by agents loyal to Saddam. US support was also questionable - requests by the CIA station chief in Amman for American air support were refused by the Clinton administration. Many participants were executed. Lands and factories belonging to the Allawi family were confiscated. Even their graveyard in Najaf was seized, although it was later returned. According to Allawi, his family lost $250M worth of assets. US support for INA continued, receiving $6 million in covert aid in 1996 and $5 million in 1995 (according to books by David Wurmser as well as Andrew and Patrick Cockburn).

The INA channelled the report from an Iraqi officer claiming that Iraq could deploy its supposed weapons of mass destruction within "45 minutes" to British Intelligence. This claim featured prominently in the September Dossier which the British government released in 2002 to gain public support for the Iraq invasion. In the aftermath of the war, the "45 minute claim" was also at the heart of the confrontation between the British government and the BBC, and the death of David Kelly later examined by Lord Hutton. Giving evidence to the Hutton Inquiry, the head of MI6 Richard Dearlove suggested that the claim related to battlefield weapons rather than weapons of mass destruction.

== Post-Saddam ==
Shortly after the fall of Saddam Hussein in 2003, the Coalition Provisional Authority (CPA) was established by the occupying forces in order to administer the country until sovereignty could be restored. The CPA decided to establish a grouping of senior Iraqi politicians to carry out some administrative responsibilities, with a view to giving the occupation a more "Iraqi face". This grouping was referred to as the Governing Council, and was made up of 25 Iraqis that were appointed by the CPA. Allawi was one of those selected to serve on the Governing Council, and held the position of Minister of Defence (although his real responsibilities in that regard were limited considering Iraq remained under occupation). He held the rotating presidency of the interim governing council during October 2003. In April 2004, Allawi reportedly resigned as head of the IGC security committee over concerns of US bombing in Fallujah, according to a letter published in INA's newspaper.

In December 2003, he flew to CIA headquarters in Langley together with fellow INA official Nouri Badran to discuss detailed plans for setting up a domestic secret service. The agency was to be headed by Badran, a former Ba'athist who served Saddam as an ambassador until 1990, and, controversially, recruited several agents for Saddam's Mukhabarat. When the Iraqi National Intelligence Service was set up in March 2004, its designated director was Mohammed Abdullah Mohammed al-Shehwani, another former Ba'athist exile with ties to INA.

== Interim Prime Minister ==
On 28 May 2004, Allawi was elected unanimously by the Governing Council to be the Interim Prime Minister of Iraq to govern the country beginning with the United States' handover of sovereignty (30 June 2004) until national elections, scheduled for early 2005. Although many believe the decision was reached largely on the advice of United Nations special envoy to Iraq, Lakhdar Brahimi, The New York Times reported that Brahimi only endorsed him reluctantly after pressure from U.S. officials. (In response to a question about the role of the U.S. in Allawi's appointment, Brahimi replied: "I sometimes say, I'm sure he doesn't mind me saying that, Bremer is the dictator of Iraq. He has the money. He has the signature. Nothing happens without his agreement in this country.") Two weeks later, Brahimi announced his resignation, due to "great difficulties and frustration".

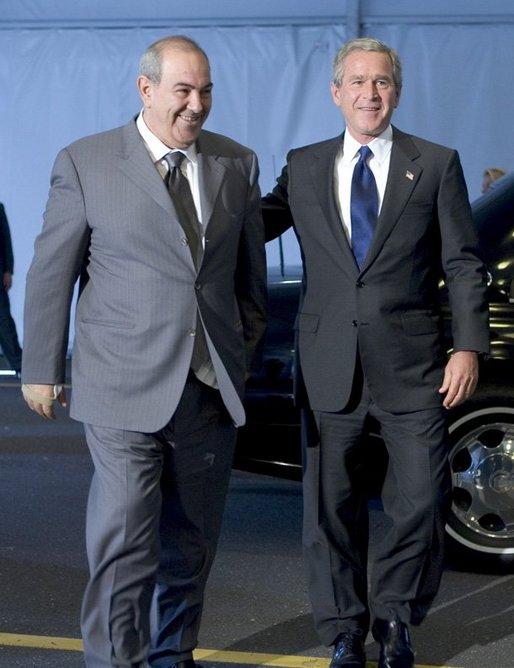
Allawi meets with U.S. President George W. Bush in New York, 21 September 2004

At the time of his nomination, Allawi was often described in the US mainstream media as a moderate Shia, a member of Iraq's majority faith, chosen for his secular, national views. On 28 June 2004 (two days early), the U.S.-led coalition handed over power to Allawi and the Iraqi Interim Government, who were sworn in later that same day. After his interim government assumed legal custody of Saddam Hussein and re-introduced capital punishment, Allawi gave assurances that he would not interfere with the trial and would accept any court decisions. In an interview with Dubai-based TV station Al Arabiya he said: "As for the execution, that is for the court to decide—so long as a decision is reached impartially and fairly."

Allawi's government also wrote a new emergency regulation, which allows the executive branch to declare martial law, impose curfews and detain suspects. Paul Bremer's aides said Allawi lacked the power to impose martial law, and Secretary of State Colin Powell warned that the U.S. would not support such a move. "The last thing we want", says a senior U.S. official, "is for the world to think we're foisting a new strongman on Iraq". Though, in addition to the stick of martial law, the government planned to offer a carrot of a broad amnesty for insurgents who have taken up arms against the U.S.-led occupation forces. Allawi himself has made clear that his government will reach out to Iraqi insurgents who have fought the Coalition for "patriotic motives" while seeking to isolate and destroy foreign elements such as the network led by the Jordanian jihadist Abu Musab al-Zarqawi. Allawi knew that both the Sunni insurgency and the one waged by supporters of Shiite firebrand Moqtada Sadr have significant popular support, while his own government has yet to win the loyalty of Iraqis. On 18 July, Iraqi militants offered a $285,000 reward for anyone who could kill Iyad Allawi.

During the summer of 2004, Allawi made several decisions seen as controversial at the time, but later worked in his interest as they demonstrated to Iraqis that Allawi did not favour one sect over another, and that he was a strong leader not afraid to use force to bring back the rule of law. Most notably, his decision to support the military incursions of both Najaf and Falluja made him extremely unpopular amongst some Iraqis at the time. He also announced the creation of General Security Directorate, a domestic spy agency, whose main role is to counteract terrorist groups and the Iraqi insurgency.

Allawi led the Iraqi National Accord during the January 2005 Iraqi election. His campaign was mainly characterised by his attempt to combat the character assassination that was led by Iranian-sponsored groups. His campaign suffered when he visited the Imam Ali shrine in Najaf on 4 December 2004, where an unknown group attacked him. Allawi claimed that it was an assassination attempt.

The INA came in at third place in the first elections, with 14% of the vote, which on a party versus coalition makes him head one of the largest represented parties. In the 2010 elections, Allawi's list won the most votes and beat incumbent Prime Minister Nuri al-Maliki by 2 seats.

=== Assassination attempt ===
On 3 December 2004 Rafik Yousef and two other men, all members of Ansar al-Islam were arrested, and later convicted, of planning to assassinate Allawi.

In one tape in August 2004, a speaker identified as Abu Anas al-Shami (second man of Zarqawi and leader of Jama'at al-Tawhid wal-Jihad made up mostly by foreigners) said the militants planned to kill Iraqi prime minister Ayad Allawi, soldiers and police officers.

== Post Premiership ==
In preparation for the next parliamentary elections that took place in Iraq in December 2005, Allawi formed an alliance between many groups, including secular Sunni and Shia groups and the Iraqi Communist Party under one electoral list (the Iraqi National List).

The Iraqi National List was represented in the coalition government led by Nouri al-Maliki, but Allawi himself did not take a Cabinet post. The party eventually boycotted the government in 2007. In preparation for upcoming national elections, Allawi formed a new coalition with leading Shia politician Iskander Witwit (one of the leaders of the 1991 uprising against Saddam), Shia tribal Sheikh Hussein al-Shalan, the deputy Prime Minister Rafi al-Issawi, Sunni politician Saleh Mutlaq and Sunni Vice President Tariq al-Hashemi called the Iraqi National Movement.

The 2010 parliamentary election ended with a weeks-long wait for an announcement of results by the Iraqi election commission. When the results finally came on 26 March 2010, Allawi's Iraqiya bloc was declared the biggest winner of the parliamentary election with two seats more than Allawi's rival al-Maliki's party in the Assembly.

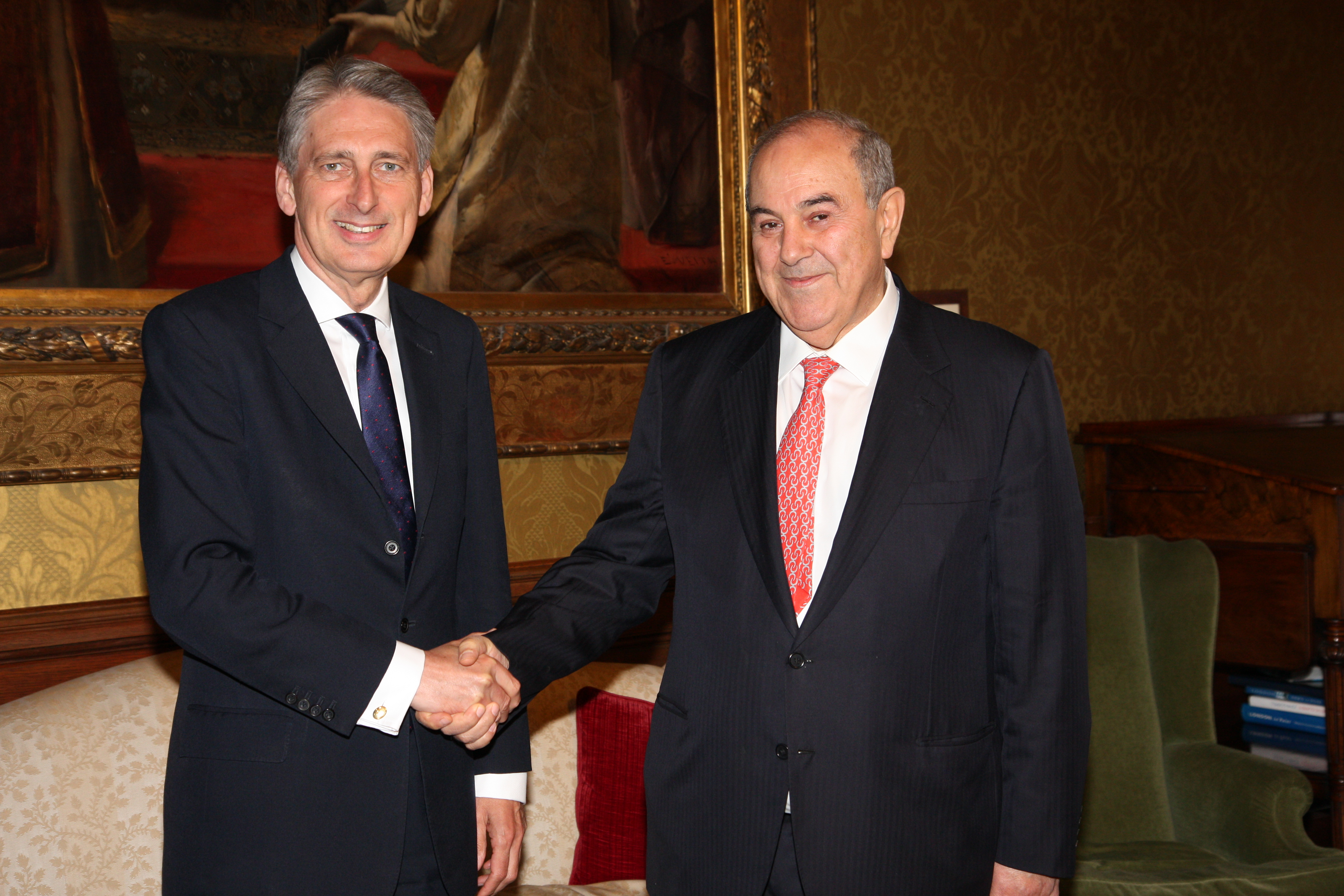
Allawi meets with Foreign Secretary Philip Hammond in London on 8 June 2015.

He was appointed one of the three Vice Presidents of Iraq by new Prime Minister Haider al-Abadi on 8 September 2014. On 11 August 2015, the Parliament approved a reform package by Prime Minister al-Abadi that foresaw, among other measures, the elimination of the three vice president posts. However, following a lawsuit filed by fellow Vice President Usama al-Nujayfi, al-Maliki declared in September 2015 that he was still holding his office because removing the post was not in line with the Iraqi Constitution. Osama al-Nujaifi filed a complaint against the decision in November 2015, calling it unconstitutional. On 10 October 2016, the three posts of Vice Presidents were restored by the Supreme Court of Iraq which termed their abolition unconstitutional.

Allawi stated on 17 April 2017, that he had received information from Iraqi and regional contacts knowledgeable about Iraq that the Islamic State of Iraq and the Levant group was in talks with al-Qaeda about a possible alliance. He added that even if the group lost all of its territory, its insurgency in the form of sleeper cells will continue.

Allawi stated that "the Iraqi people are longing for the days of Saddam Hussein".

== Personal life ==
Allawi has faced several assassination attempts in England and throughout the Middle East, purportedly by agents of Saddam's regime.

According to Mossack Fonseca documents that came to light in the Panama Papers release by the International Consortium of Investigative Journalists in 2016, Allawi had Mossack Fonseca supply a nominee director to stand in for him and shield his ownership of the Panama-registered company IMF Holdings. This company was dissolved in 2013; it had owned a $1.5 million house near London. A second offshore, Moonlight Estates, registered in the British Virgin Islands, also held a property in London on his behalf. His media contact confirmed his sole ownership of the two companies and of Foxwood Estates as well, saying IMF was set up to own real estate for security reasons based on legal advice following an assassination attempt, and added that any income from the properties was reported, and taxes paid "promptly and on time".

He is the cousin of Ahmed Chalabi, Ali Allawi and Mohammed Tawfiq Allawi.

Allawi has two daughters and one son: Sarah (born 1988), Najat (born 1989) and Alhamza (born 1996).

Political offices
Preceded by Ahmed Chalabi	President of the Governing Council of Iraq; 2003	Succeeded by Jalal Talabani
Preceded by Ghazi Mashal Ajil al-Yawer as President of the Governing Council of Iraq	Prime Minister of Iraq; 2004–2005	Succeeded by Ibrahim al-Jaafari
Preceded by Khodair al-Khozaei	Vice President of Iraq; 2014–2015; 2016–2018	Succeeded by Vacant
