= List of political parties in Iraq =

The following is a list of political parties in Iraq.

Iraq is a multi-party parliamentary state. Political parties are commonly grouped by ideology and ethnic affiliation, as well as by the group with which they were listed on the ballot of the 2005 Iraqi National Assembly election.

The electoral system of Iraq favours larger parties and coalitions, but makes it difficult for a single party to dominate with a majority.

== Parliamentary alliances and parties ==
Party	Leader	Political position	Ideology	MPs
Reconstruction and Development Coalition ائتلاف الإعمار والتنمية; Iʼtilāf al-Iʻmār wa-al-tanmiyah	Mohammed Shia' al-Sudani	Centre	Iraqi nationalism; Pragmatism; Reformism	46 / 329
State of Law Coalition إئتلاف دولة القانون; I'tilāf Dawlat al-Qānūn	Nouri al-Maliki	Syncretic	Populism; Anti-secularism; Statism	29 / 329
Al-Sadiqoun Bloc كتلة الصادقون	Adnan Fayhan Moussa Cheri		Political Islam; Religious conservatism; Islamism	27 / 329
Progress Party حزب تقدم; Ḥizb Taqadum	Mohamed Al-Halbousi	Big tent	Nonsectarianism; Reformism	27 / 329
Kurdistan Democratic Party پارتی دیموکراتی کوردستان; Partiya Demokrat a Kurdistanê	Masoud Barzani	Big tent	Kurdish nationalism; Secularism	26 / 329
Badr Organization منظمة بدر; Munaẓẓama Badr	Hadi Al-Amiri	Right-wing	Shia Islamism; Khomeinism	18 / 329
Patriotic Union of Kurdistan یەکێتیی نيشتمانیی کوردستان; Yekêtîy Nîştimanîy Kurdistan	Bafel Talabani	Centre-left to left-wing	Kurdish nationalism; Social democracy; Secularism	15 / 329
Alliance of Nation State Forces تحالف قوى الدولة الوطنية; Taḥāluf Quwā ad-Dawla al-Waṭaniyya	Ammar al-Hakim	Centre	Shia Islam	15 / 329
Azem Alliance ائتلاف عزم; Iʾtilāf al-Azem	Khamis al-Khanjar	Centre	Sunni Islamism; Iraqi nationalism; Liberalism	15 / 329
National Sovereignty Alliance تحالف السيادة	Khamis al-Khanjar			9 / 329
Al-Asas Coalition الأساس	Muhsin Al-Mandalawi			8 / 329
Rights Movement حقوق	Hassan Muanes			6 / 329
National Determination Alliance التصميم الوطني	Thabit al-Abbasi			5 / 329
Good News, Iraq أبشر يا عراق	Humam Hamoudi			4 / 329
Ishraqat Kanoon إشراقة كانون	Jaafar Aziz	Centre	Islamic democracy; Moderation	8 / 329
Services Alliance تحالف خدمات	Shibl al-Zaidi			5 / 329
Tasmim Alliance تحالف تصميم	Sarah al-Salihi		Shia Islamism; Islamic democracy	6 / 329
Kurdistan Islamic Union یەکگرتووی ئیسلامیی کوردستان; Yekgirtiya Îslamî ya Kurdistanê	Salahaddin Bahaaddin	Right-wing	Islamism; Social conservatism	4 / 329
National Stance Movement ڕەوتی هەڵوێستی نیشتیمانی; Rewtî Helwêstî Nîştimanî	Ali Hama Saleh	Big tent	Anti-corruption; Kurdish nationalism; Islamism	5 / 329
New Generation Movement جوڵانه‌وه‌ی نه‌وه‌ی نوێ; Culanewey Newey Nwê	Shaswar Abdulwahid	Centre	Liberalism	3 / 329
Al-Anbar Is Our Identity Alliance الأنبار هويتنا	Mohamed Al-Halbousi			3 / 329
Nineveh for Its People الحسم الوطني	Sheikh Abdullah Ajil Al-Yawar			3 / 329
Wasit Ajmal Alliance واسط أجمل	Shibl al-Zaidi			4 / 329
National Party of the Masses الجماهيرية الوطنية	Ahmed Abdullah al-Jubouri			3 / 329
Qimam Coalition قمم	Mohamed Al-Halbousi			3 / 329
Tafawq Alliance التفوق	Faisal Al-Issawi			2 / 329
Sumerian Movement سومريون				2 / 329
Unified Iraqi Turkmen Front الجبهة التركمانية	Seman Agha			2 / 329
Al-Faw Zakho Coalition ائتلاف الفاو زاخو	Amer Abdul-Jabbar			1 / 329
Saladin Unified Alliance صلاح الدين الموحد				1 / 329
Nineveh's People Union اتحاد أهل نينوى				2 / 329
Arab Project المشروع العربي في العراق	Khamis al-Khanjar			1 / 329
Diyala First Coalition ديالى أولاً	Nouri al-Maliki			1 / 329
Arab Alliance of Kirkuk التحالف العربي في كركوك	Rakan al-Jubouri			1 / 329
Saladin Partnership Alliance تحالف شراكتنا				1 / 329
National Identity تحالف الهوية الوطنية	Rayan al-Kildani			1 / 329
Kurdistan Justice Group کۆمەڵی دادگەری كوردستان; Komelî Dadgerî Kurdistan	Ali Bapir	Right-wing	Kurdish-Islamism; Social conservatism	1 / 329
Yazidi Cause Alliance تحالف القضية الإيزيدية	Murad Ismael		Yazidi interests	1 / 329
Thabitun ثابتون	Burhan Al-Maamouri			1 / 329
Idraak Movement حركة إدراك	Akram Sharba			1 / 329
State Support Bloc كتلة دعم الدولة	Murtadha Al-Saadi			1 / 329

== Former and non-parliamentary alliances and parties ==
Party	Leader	Political position	Ideology
Fatah Alliance ائتلاف الفتح; Iʾtilāf al-Fatḥ	Hadi al-Amiri	Right-wing	Shia Islamism; Pro-Iran; Anti-secularism
Kurdistani Coalition هاوپەیمانی كوردستانی; Hevpeymanîya Kurdistanî	Abdul Rahman Mustafa	Big tent	Kurdish nationalism; Self-determination
Extension Movement ائتلاف حركة امتداد; Harakat Emtidad	Alaa al-Rikabi	Centre	Liberalism; Secularism; Iraqi nationalism
Babylon Movement حركة بابليون	Rayan al-Kildani		
Victory Alliance ائتلاف النصر; Iʾtilāf al-Naṣr	Haider al-Abadi	Centre	Nonsectarianism; Realpolitik; Islamic democracy
Alliance Towards Reforms تحالف سائرون للإصلاح; Tahaluf Saairun al-Islah	Hassan al-Aquli	Big tent	Iraqi nationalism; Anti-corruption
National Coalition ائتلاف الوطنية; Al-Wataniya	Ayad Allawi	Centre	Secularism
National Wisdom Movement تيار الحكمة الوطني; Tayar al-Hikmah al-Watani	Ammar al-Hakim	Big tent	Islamism; Nonsectarianism
Uniters for Reform Coalition ائتلاف متحدون للاصلاح; I'tilāf Muttaḥidūn lil-Iṣlāḥ	Osama al-Nujaifi		Regionalism; Islamic democracy; Populism

Alliance Towards Reforms "Saairun"
Party	Leader	Political position & ideologies
Sadrist Movement	Muqtada al-Sadr	Shia Islamism; Religious Conservatism; Iraqi nationalism Populism; Anti-imperialism
Iraqi Communist Party	Raid Fahmi	Communism; Classical Marxism; Reformism; Secularism; Nonsectarianism
Youth Movement for Change Party		
Party of Progress and Reform		
Iraqi Republican Group		
State of Justice Party		

Victory Alliance
Party	Leader	Political position & ideologies
Ataa Movement	Falih Alfayyadh	Islamic Democracy
Popular Movement in Iraq	Mohammed Taha al-Hamdoun	Sunni Arab Interests; Iraqi nationalism Federalism
Iraqi National Congress	Ahmed Chalabi	Centrism; Nonsectarianism

Fatah Alliance
Party	Leader	Political position & ideologies
Badr Organization	Hadi Al-Amiri	Shia Islamism
Al-Sadiqoun Bloc	Adnan Fihan Moussa Cheri	Shia Political Thought; Religious Sectarianism
Islamic Virtue Party	Ammar Tu'ma Abd Abbas	Khomeinism; Islamism; Anti-Zionism
National Reform Trend	Ibrahim al-Jaafari	Islamism
Islamic Supreme Council of Iraq المجلس الأعلى الإسلامي العراقي al-Madschlis al-aʿlā l-islāmī l-ʿIrāqī	Humam Hamoudi	Decentralization; Shia Islamism; Sistanism

State of Law Coalition
Party	Leader	Political position & ideologies
Islamic Dawa Party حزب الدعوة الإسلامية; Ḥizb al Daʿwa al-Islāmiyya	Nouri al-Maliki	Islamic democracy
Islamic Dawa Party – Iraq Organisation حزب الدعوة الاسلامية - تنظيم العراق; Ḥizb al Daʿwa al-Islāmiyya – Tanzim al-Iraq	Hashim Al-Mosawy	Shia Islamism
Islamic Union of Iraqi Turkoman	Abbas al-Bayati	Iraqi Turkmen Interests

Kurdistani Coalition
Party	Leader	Political position and Ideologies
Kurdistan Democratic Party	Masoud Barzani	Kurdish nationalism Self-determination
Patriotic Union of Kurdistan	Bafel Talabani	Kurdish nationalism Social democracy Secularism
Kurdish Islamic Group	Ali Bapir	Salafism
Kurdistan Islamic Union	Salaheddine Bahaaeddin	Islamic Democracy; Kurdish nationalism
Gorran Movement	Omar Said Ali	Secularism; Kurdish nationalism Social liberalism Liberal Socialism; Federalism; Regionalism
National Coalition	Aram Qadir	Kurdish nationalism Social Democracy
Communist Party of Kurdistan – Iraq	Kawa Mahmud	Communism
Kurdistan Islamic Movement	Ehsan Ali Abdul Aziz	Kurdish nationalism Islamism
Kurdistan Toilers' Party	Balen Abdullah	Socialism; Left-wing nationalism
Kurdistan Socialist Democratic Party	Mohammed Haji Mahmoud	Kurdish nationalism Social Democracy
Kurdistan Society's Freedom Movement (Tevgera Azadi)	Tara Husên; Selam Ebdulla	Democratic confederalism
Yazidi Democratic Party	Haydar Shesho	Yazidi Rights
National Stance Movement	Ali Hama Saleh	Kurdish nationalism Anti-corruption
People's Front	Lahur Talabani	Kurdish nationalism Social democracy

Other Parties
Party	Leader	Political position and Ideologies
Chaldean Syriac Assyrian Popular Council	Shamsuddin Georgis Zaya	Assyrian nationalism Autonomism; Regionalism
Iraqi Turkmen Front	Arshad al-Salihi	Regionalism; Turkmen Interests
Civil Democratic Alliance	Ali Khathem Aziz	Secularism; Nonsectarianism; Anti-corruption; Third way
Assyrian Democratic Movement	Yonadam Kanna	Assyrian interests Federalism
Sons of Mesopotamia	Galeta Shaba	Assyrian nationalism Self-determination; Populism
Yazidi Movement for Reform and Progress	Amin Farhan Jejo	Yazidi Interests; Regionalism

== Other parties ==
- Al Neshoor Party
- Alliance of Independent Democrats – led by Adnan Pachachi
- Assyria Liberation Party
- Bet-Nahrain Democratic Party
- Constitutional Monarchy Movement – led by Sharif Ali Bin al-Hussein
- Democratic Monarchy Alliance
- Feyli Kurd’s National Movement – led by Judge Munir Haddad
- Green Party of Iraq
- The Upholders of the Message (Al-Risaliyun)
- Iraqi Democratic Union
- Rawafid El-Iraq led by Jalal B. Mejel AlGaood
- Ezidi Freedom and Democracy Party (PADE)
- Leftist Worker-Communist Party of Iraq
- Popular Unity Party
- Turkmen People's Party
- Worker-Communist Party of Iraq

== Historical parties ==
Defunct parties and alliances
Name(English)	Name(Arabic)	Acronym	Leader	Political position & ideologies
Wahdat an-Nidal	Wahdat an-Nidal وحدة النضال	-	-	Communism
Shursh	Şoreş	-	-	Communism
Rayat ash-Shaghilah	Rayat Ash-Shagillah راية الشغّيلة	-	Jamal al-Haidari	Communism
Organization of Iraqi Revolutionary Communists	Tanzim Al-shiyo'iyyin Al-Thawriyyin Al-'Araqiyyin تنظيم الشيوعيين الثوريين العراقيين	IRC	Tahsin Ali Ash-Shaikhli	Communism
Leninist Group in the Iraqi Communist Movement	Al-Fariq Al-Lenini Fi Al-Haraka Al-Shiyo'iya Al-'Araqia الفريق اللينيني في الحركة الشيوعية العراقية	-	Khalid Abdullah as-Salam Khalil al-Jazairi	Communism
League of Iraqi Communists	Al-Rabita Al-shiyo'iyyin Al-'Araqiyyin رابطة الشيوعيين العراقيين	-	Daud as-Sayegh	Communism
Iraqi Communist Vanguard Organisation	-	-	-	Communism
Iraqi Communist Party of Daud as-Sayegh	-	-	Daud as-Sayegh	Communism
Iraqi Communist Party (Central Command)	Widhat al-Qa'idah	-	Adil Abdul-Mahdi	Communism
Ila al-Amam (Iraq)	Ila al-Amam إلى الأمام		Thunun Ayub Yaqub Cohen	Communism
Arab Unity Party	Hizb Al-Wahda Al-Arabiya حزب الوحدة العربية	AUP	Sobhi Abdul Hamid	Arab socialism
Arab Struggle Party	Hizb Al-Kifah Al-Arabi حزب الكفاح العربي	ASP	-	Nasserism
Arabic Toilers' Movement	Harakt Al-Kadeheen Al-Arab حركة الكادحين العرب	ATM	Unknown; several	Marxist-Leninist
Reconciliation and Liberation Bloc	Kutla al-Musalaha wa't-Tahrir	RLB	Misha'an al-Juburi	Secularism; Arab nationalism Iraqi nationalism
Constitutional Union Party	حزب الاتحاد الدستوري		Nuri al-Said	Anti-communism; Arab nationalism
Party of National Brotherhood	حزب الاخاء الوطني		Naji Al-Suwaidi; Yasin al-Hashimi; Rashid Ali al-Gaylani	Pan-Arabism; Arab nationalism
Socialist Nation Party	حزب الامة الاشتراكي		Salih Jabr	Social democracy Arab nationalism
Ahali group	الأهالي		Ja'far Abu al-Timman	Populism; Iraqi nationalism
Unified Popular Front	Al-Jabha Al-Sha'abiya Al-Mutahida الجبهة الشعبية المتحدة	UPF	-	-
Liberal Party	حزب الاحرار		Tawfiq al-Suwaidi	Classical liberalism Constitutional monarchism
National Democratic Party	Hizb al Wataniyah al Dimuqratiyah الحزب الوطني الديمقراطي	NDP	Kamel al-Chaderji	Social democracy Democratic socialism
United Popular Front	الجبهة الشعبية المتحدة		Taha al-Hashimi	Reformism; Iraqi nationalism
Iraqi Independence Party	حزب الاستقلال العراقي		Muhammad Mahdi Kubba	Iraqi nationalism
National Union Front	جبهة الاتحاد الوطني			Iraqi nationalism
Iraqi Arab Socialist Union	الاتحاد الاشتراكي العربي العراقي		Fuad al-Rikabi	Nasserism; Pan-Arabism

Outlawed parties
Name(English)	Name(Arabic)	Acronym	Leader	Political position & ideologies
Hizb ut-Tahrir	Hizb at-Tahrir حزب التحرير	HT	Ata Abu Rashta	Caliphalism
Arab Socialist Ba'ath Party in Iraq	Hizb al-Ba‘th al-'Arabi al-Ishtiraki fi al-'Iraq حزب البعث العربي الاشتراكي في العراق	-	Mohammed Younis al-Ahmed	Saddamism
Al-Awda	Al-Awda العودة	-	Mohammed Younis al-Ahmed	Ba'athism

== See also ==
- Politics of Iraq
- List of political parties by country
