= Al-Kadhimi Government =

Government of Iraq from 2020 to 2022

- Cabinet of Iraq

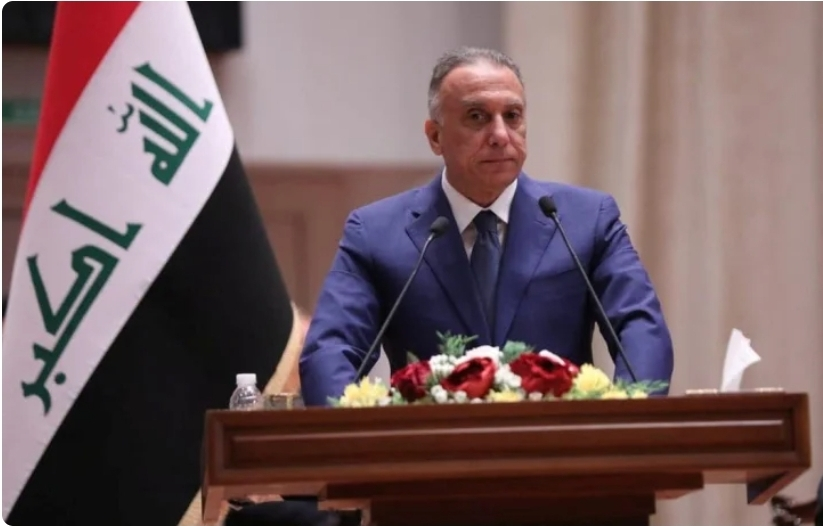
- Prime Minister al-Kadhimi addressing the Council of Representatives during the vote on his government
- Date formed: 7 May 2020
- Date dissolved: 27 October 2022

People and organisations
- President: Barham Salih (until 17 October 2022); Abdul Latif Rashid (from 17 October 2022)
- Prime Minister: Mustafa Al-Kadhimi
- Deputy Prime Minister: Ali Allawi (until 16 August 2022)
- Member parties: Alliance Towards Reforms; Victory Alliance; Kurdistan Democratic Party; Al-Wataniya; National Wisdom Movement; Muttahidoon; Babylon Movement
- Status in legislature: Majority government 177 / 329 (54%)
- Opposition parties: State of Law Coalition

History
- Legislature term: 4th Legislature
- Predecessor: Abdul Mahdi Government
- Successor: Al Sudani Government

The Al-Kadhimi Government was the government of the Republic of Iraq from 2020 to 2022, led by Prime Minister Mustafa Al-Kadhimi, a former director of the National Intelligence Service. It was formed on 7 May 2020 after extensive negotiations. While Al-Kadhimi himself and most cabinet ministers where sworn in on that date, seven ministers were not confirmed by the Council of Representatives until 6 June 2020.

== Composition ==
Cabinet members
Portfolio	Minister	Took office	Left office	Party
Prime Minister	Mustafa Al-Kadhimi	7 May 2020	27 October 2022	Independent
Deputy Prime Minister	Ali Allawi	7 May 2020	16 August 2022	Independent
Interior Minister	Othman al-Ghanmi	7 May 2020	27 October 2022	Independent
Finance Minister	Ali Allawi	7 May 2020	16 August 2022	Independent
Finance Minister	Ihsan Abdul Jabbar Ismail	16 August 2022	11 October 2022	NWM
Finance Minister	Hayam Nema (acting)	15 October 2022	27 October 2022	Independent
Foreign Affairs Minister	Fuad Hussein	6 June 2020	27 October 2022	KDP
Defense Minister	Juma Inad	7 May 2020	27 October 2022	Independent
Oil Minister	Ihsan Abdul Jabbar Ismail	6 June 2020	27 October 2022	NWM
Agriculture Minister	Mohammad Karim Al-Khafaji	6 June 2020	27 October 2022	Fatah
Communications Minister	Arkan Ahmad	7 May 2020	27 October 2022	Victory Alliance
Culture Minister	Hassan Nazim	6 June 2020	27 October 2022	Fatah
Housing & Reconstruction Minister	Nazanine Mohammed	7 May 2020	27 October 2022	KDP
Electricity Minister	Majid Mahdi Hantoush	7 May 2020	27 October 2022	Independent
Education Minister	Ali Hamid Al-Dlemi	7 May 2020	27 October 2022	Independent
Justice Minister	Salar Abdul Sattar	6 June 2020	27 October 2022	KDP
Health Minister	Hassam Mohammed Al-Tamimi	7 May 2020	27 October 2022	Independent
Higher Education and Scientific Research Minister	Nabil Kazem Abdel-Sahib	7 May 2020	27 October 2022	Fatah
Industry and Minerals Minister	Manhal Aziz	7 May 2020	27 October 2022	Independent
Environment Minister	Jassim Abdul Aziz Al-Falahi	7 May 2020	27 October 2022	Independent
Labour & Social Affairs Minister	Adil Hashush	7 May 2020	27 October 2022	NWM
Migration and Displacement Minister	Evan Faeq Yakoob	6 June 2020	27 October 2022	Babylon Movement
Planning Minister	Khalid Batal Najim Abdullah	7 May 2020	27 October 2022	Independent
Trade Minister	Alaa Ahmed Hassan Obaid	6 June 2020	27 October 2022	Independent
Transport Minister	Nasser Hussein al-Shibli	7 May 2020	27 October 2022	Fatah
Water Resources Minister	Rachid Mahdi al-Hamdani	7 May 2020	27 October 2022	Fatah
Youth and Sports Minister	Adnan Dirjal	7 May 2020	27 October 2022	Independent
