= Secularism in Iraq =

Secularism in modern Iraq dates back to the 14 July Revolution of 1958 which overthrew the Kingdom of Iraq's Hashemite dynasty and established the Iraqi Republic. Islam is the official state religion of Iraq, but the constitution, guarantees freedom of religious belief and practices for Muslims, Christians, Yazidis and Sabean-Mandaeans.

The secular Iraqi Communist Party was the country's largest movement between the 1940s and 1960s, and was founded by activists from different backgrounds.

Since the 2003 invasion of Iraq, Iraqi society has experienced crises in its transition from a strong centralized state under the secular Baʿth Party to a state dominated by Shia Islamist parties. In particular sectarian violence increased dramatically. In 2006, OpenDemocracy reported that the regime change had damaged the secularism of Ba'athist Iraq. The emergence of the Islamic State of Iraq presented a challenge to secularism.

Since the end of the War in Iraq, secularism has grown in the country. In 2010, it was reported that Iraq was moving towards secularism. The growth of a secular, non-sectarian middle class has been seen.

== Secular political parties ==
- Civil Democratic Alliance
- Civilized Alliance
- Emtidad Movement
- Gorran Movement
- Iraq Freedom Congress
- Iraqi Communist Party
- Iraqi National Accord
- Iraqi National Congress
- Iraqi National Movement
- National Democratic Party
- Organization of Women's Freedom in Iraq
- People's Party
- People's Union
- Progress Party
- Reconciliation and Liberation Bloc

== See also ==
- Irreligion in Iraq
- Islam and secularism
