= Abu Feras Alhamdani =

Iraqi politician

Abu Feras Alhamdani ابو فراس الحمداني

Politician
- Incumbent
- Assumed office 2009

Personal details
- Born: 1974 (age 51–52) Baghdad, Iraq
- Party: Eradaa Movement
- Occupation: Politician, leading member of Eradaa Movement and political analyst.

Abu Feras Alhamdani (Arabic: ابو فراس الحمداني) is an Iraqi politician, leading member of Eradaa Movement, political analyst, media personality and former TV presenter.

== Biography ==
Alhamdani was born on 1979 in Baghdad. He entered the Iraqi elections as a candidate for the Eradaa Movement. He is a leading member of Eradaa Movement. He was also a media personality and TV presenter for Al Rasheed TV.

== Arrest ==
Qatari authorities detained Abu Feras Alhamdani after a television program broadcast by Al-Jazeera which hosted the candidate of "Karama" "Najah Al-Mezan", who did not win the parliamentary elections held on 30 April.

The episode of Al-Jazeera TV program "The Opposite Direction", presented by the journalist Faisal al-Qassem, was a sharp verbal argument that developed into a physical dispute. The focus of the episode was "The security situation in Iraq and the battle of the Iraqi army with bandits." Al-Hamdani was lined up alongside the security forces.

== See also ==
- Eradaa Movement
- Hanan Saeed Mohsen al-Fatlawi
