= Hasan Fadaam Asal =

Iraqi politician

Hassan Fadaam al-Janabi
- حسن فدعم الجنابي

Member of the Council of Representatives of Iraq
- In office 2018–2022
- Constituency: Babil Governorate

Personal details
- Born: 1976 (age 49–50) Babil Governorate, Iraq
- Party: National Wisdom Movement
- Other political affiliations: Iraqiyoun Alliance; State Forces Alliance; Coordination Framework
- Occupation: Politician

Hassan Fadaam al-Janabi (Arabic: حسن فدعم الجنابي; born 1976) is an Iraqi politician who served as a member of the Council of Representatives of Iraq for Babil Governorate during the assembly's fourth term, having been elected in the 2018 Iraqi parliamentary election. A figure in Ammar al-Hakim's National Wisdom Movement, he sat on parliament's Legal Committee and has been widely quoted by Iraqi and regional media as a spokesman for Hakim's blocs and later for the Shia Coordination Framework.

== Early life and education ==
Al-Janabi was born in 1976 in Babil Governorate, Iraq, where he continues to reside. According to the Al-Rafidain Center for Dialogue, he holds a bachelor's degree in Islamic sciences from Imam Kadhim University, completed in 2014. The Iraqi Parliament Monitor's record for his term lists his educational attainment as secondary-level.

== Career ==
=== Local and security roles ===
Before entering parliament, al-Janabi held several local administrative and security posts in Babil Governorate, serving as security adviser to the Governor of Babil, deputy head of the Babil Provincial Council, and director of the Popular Mobilization Forces office in the governorate. His listed areas of expertise are security, military planning, and strategic administration.

=== Member of parliament ===
Al-Janabi was elected to the Council of Representatives for Babil in the 2018 election, standing for the National Wisdom Movement and receiving 8,399 votes. It was his first term in parliament, and he served on the chamber's Legal Committee. During the term he sat with the Iraqiyoun Alliance, the parliamentary grouping led by Ammar al-Hakim.

In August 2020, ahead of Prime Minister Mustafa al-Kadhimi's visit to Washington, al-Janabi told the Iraqi News Agency that relations with the United States should be balanced and grounded in respect for Iraqi sovereignty, adding that Iraq should adopt a mediating role rather than align with any one axis. He said Washington had substantial obligations toward Iraq that had not been met as agreed between the two states.

He stood again in the 2021 Iraqi parliamentary election; the newspaper Al-Mada reported that he and fellow Babil deputy Salim Tuhaimer remained with the National Wisdom Movement that year, unlike several colleagues who switched lists.

=== Government formation and later commentary ===
During the deadlock over electing a president in March 2022, al-Janabi—then described as a leading figure in the State Forces Alliance—said the Coordination Framework was constitutionally entitled to form a blocking third, and warned that the dispute between the Framework and the Sadrist Movement risked spilling into the streets. He characterised the National Wisdom Movement as a moderating party seeking to bring the rival camps closer together.

In December 2022, amid a dispute over the future of Iraq's de-Ba'athification body, the Accountability and Justice Commission, he told TRT Arabi that dissolving the commission fell to the Council of Representatives rather than the prime minister's office and would require new legislation passed by an absolute majority. He argued against allowing former Ba'athists to return to sensitive state positions.

In February 2023, discussing the draft revision of Iraq's election law, he identified the main points of contention as the choice between multi-member and single electoral districts, the treatment of top vote-getters and party lists, and the seat-allocation divisor. He also pointed to disagreement over voter identification cards and over the voter register in Kirkuk, and predicted that elections would slip to 2024 if the blocs failed to agree.
