= Ila al-Amam =

Ila al-Amam ("Forward!" in Arabic) may refer to:

- Ila al-Amam (Iraq). A splinter group of the Iraqi Communist Party in 1942
- Ila al-Amam (Morocco). A Moroccan Marxist movement created in 1970 by Abraham Serfaty
