= 2018 Iraqi parliamentary election =

- 12 May 2018
- All 329 seats in the Council of Representatives; 165 seats needed for a majority
Party	Leader	Vote %	Seats
Saairun	Muqtada al-Sadr	14.47	54
Fatah	Hadi Al-Amiri	13.18	48
Victory Alliance	Haider al-Abadi	10.95	42
KDP	Nechirvan Barzani	8.52	25
State of Law	Nouri al-Maliki	6.99	25
Al-Wataniya	Ayad Allawi	6.04	21
PUK	Kosrat Rasul Ali	5.97	18
NWM	Ammar al-Hakim	5.56	19
Iraqi Decision Alliance	Osama al-Nujaifi	3.55	14
Gorran	Omar Said Ali	1.94	5
NGM	Shaswar Abdulwahid	1.79	4
Anbar is Our Identity		1.39	6
Competencies for Change		1.36	2
Eradaa Movement		1.33	3
Democracy & Justice Coalition	Barham Salih	1.19	2
KIU	Salahaddin Bahaaddin	1.00	2
Civilized Alliance		0.96	2
Baghdad Alliance		0.94	3
KIG	Ali Bapir	0.89	2
Arab Alliance in Kirkuk	Rakan Al-Jabouri	0.81	3
Nineveh Is Our Identity		0.80	3
Turkmen Front of Kirkuk		0.77	3
National Fortress Coalition		0.75	3
Civil Democratic Alliance		0.69	1
Banners of Benevolence		0.62	2
Party of the Masses		0.52	2
The Passing		0.48	2
Democratic Approach		0.36	1
Babylon Movement		0.32	2
Civic Party		0.31	1
Saladin Is Our Identity		0.31	1
Assembly of the Men of Iraq		0.25	1
CSAPC		0.19	1
Rafidain List		0.19	1
Chaldean List		0.16	1
Yazidi Progress Party		0.06	1
Independents	—	0.82	3
This lists parties that won seats. See the complete results below.
Most voted-for party by governorate
Prime Minister before	Prime Minister-designate
Haider al-Abadi; Victory Alliance	Adil Abdul-Mahdi; Independent

Parliamentary elections were held in Iraq on 12 May 2018. The elections decided the 329 members of the Council of Representatives, the country's unicameral legislature, who in turn will elect the Iraqi president and prime minister. The Iraqi parliament ordered a manual recount of the results on 6 June 2018. On 10 June 2018, a storage site in Baghdad housing roughly half of the ballots from the May parliamentary election caught fire.

In October 2018 Adil Abdul-Mahdi was selected as prime minister, five months after the elections.

This election would be the last held under the Webster/Sainte-Laguë method of proportional representation, as electoral reforms passed in 2019 amid the 2019–2021 Iraqi protests created a district-based system, and sought to have representatives represent more local voices (as opposed to the entire governorate they were previously elected from), reduce deadlocks resulting from inconclusive coalition talks, as well as stop infighting amongst list members and a myriad of small lists from siphoning off votes and failing to meet the electoral threshold. It would also prevent parties from running on unified lists, which had previously led some to easily sweep all the seats in a particular governorate.

== Background ==
The elections took place six months after a non-binding independence referendum in Iraqi Kurdistan, in which 93% voted in favour of independence. In retaliation, the Iraqi government led by Haider al-Abadi closed Erbil International Airport, seized control of all border crossings between Kurdistan and neighbouring countries and, with the help of the Hashd al-Shaabi militias, militarily seized control of disputed territories, including the oil-rich city of Kirkuk. Nonetheless, Iraqi politicians called for dialogue with the Iraqi Kurdistan government and force them to formally annul the results.

The elections were originally scheduled for September 2017, but were delayed by six months due to the civil war with the Islamic State which ended in December 2017 with the recapture of their remaining territories. The largest Sunni Arab majority coalition, the Muttahidoon (Uniters for Reform), called for a further six month's delay to allow displaced voters to return to their homes. A Sunni Arab MP described holding the elections at this time as a "military coup against the political process". However, the Supreme Court ruled that delaying the elections would be unconstitutional.

== Electoral system ==
Members of the Council of Representatives are elected through the open list form of party-list proportional representation, using the 18 governorates of Iraq as the constituencies. The counting system uses the modified Sainte-Laguë method with a divisor of 1.7 which is considered as a disadvantage to smaller parties. Eight seats remain reserved for minority groups at the national level: five for Assyrians and one each for Mandaeans, Yazidis, and Shabaks. However, the Council of Representatives voted on 11 February 2018, to add an extra seat for minorities, in the Wasit Governorate for Feyli Kurds, making the total number of parliamentarians equal to 329.

In January, the Supreme Court ruled that the representation for Yazidis should be increased, although it is unclear whether this change will be implemented in time for these elections.

== International voting ==
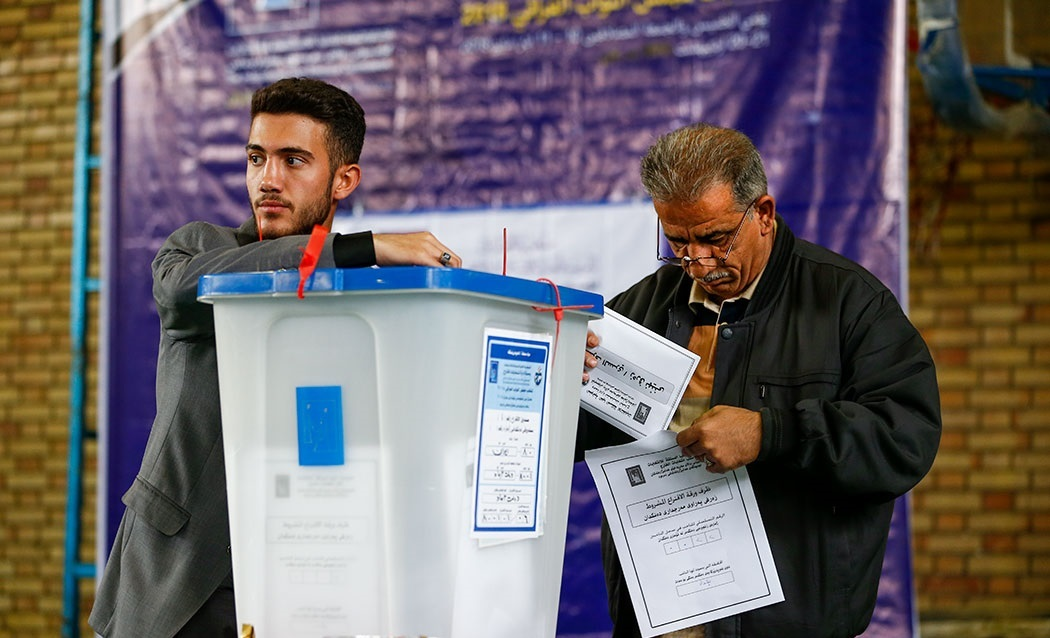
Polling stations in Tehran for the 2018 Iraqi parliamentary election

The Independent High Electoral Commission announced that Iraqis living outside of Iraq can vote in any of the 130 voting stations that were set up in 21 countries. 18 of the stations were in the United States, 15 in Sweden, 15 in Turkey, 14 in Iran, 13 in Jordan, 8 in the United Kingdom, 8 in Australia, 7 in Germany, 7 in Canada, 5 in Egypt, 4 in Denmark, 2 in Lebanon, and one each in France, Syria, Finland, Belgium, Austria, Norway, and New Zealand.

== Election day ==
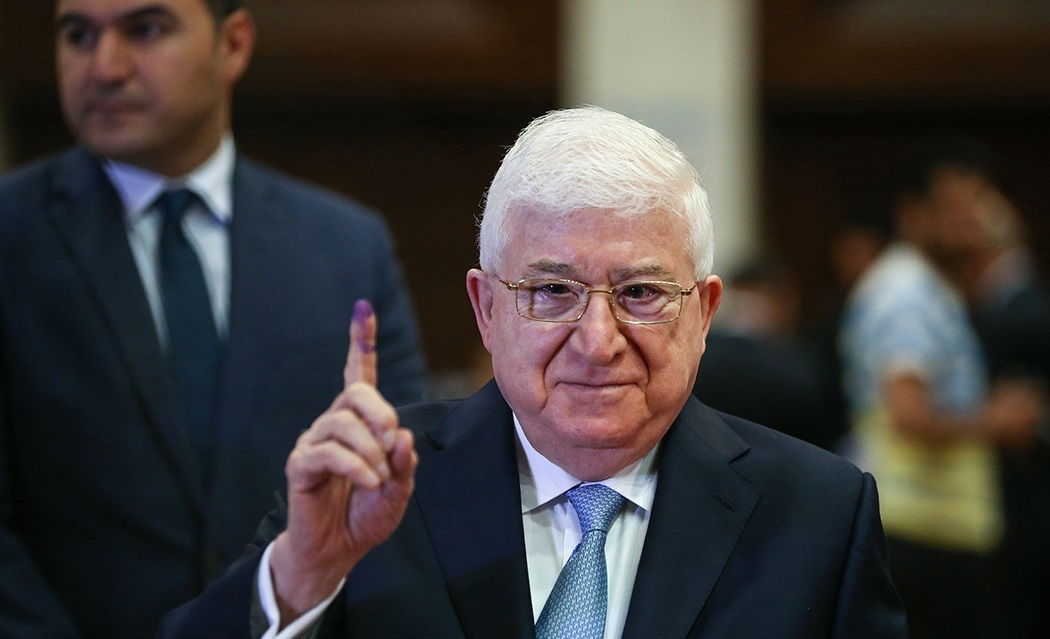
Iraqi president Fuad Masum shows his inked finger after casting a ballot at the central polling station in the Green Zone of Baghdad on 12 May

A curfew was declared by prime minister Al-Abadi from midnight Friday to 7 pm Saturday in all governorates except Baghdad, where the curfew started at noon Friday. A 24-hour closure of all airports and other border crossing was also implemented. The Iraqi airspace was open later on the day as well as the lifting of the curfew. Election day in Iraq was extremely successful from a security aspect, as no attacks were registered anywhere in the country.

== Seat allocation ==
Seats are allocated to governorates as follows:

Governorate	Seats	Women	Minority groups
Anbar	15	4	
Babil	17	4	
Baghdad	71	17	2
Basra	25	6	
Dohuk	12	3	1
Dhi Qar	19	5	
Diyala	14	4	
Erbil	16	4	1
Karbala	11	3	
Kirkuk	13	3	1
Maysan	10	3	
Muthanna	7	2	
Najaf	12	3	
Nineveh	34	8	3
Al-Qadisiyyah	11	3	
Saladin	12	3	
Sulaymaniyah	18	5	
Wasit	12	3	1
Total	329	83	9

== Campaign ==
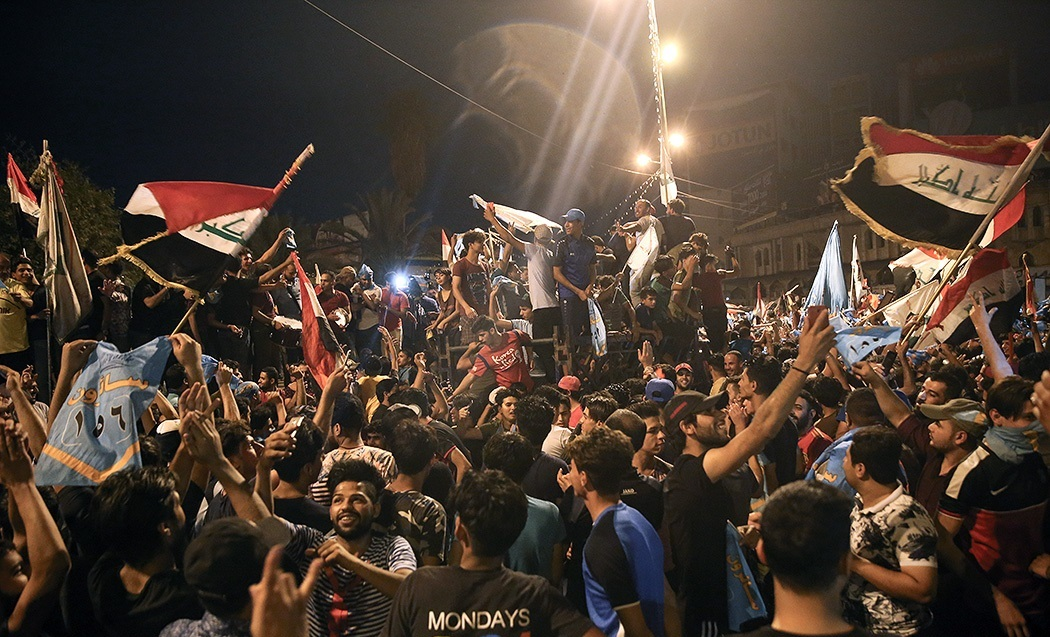
Supporters of Sadr's alliance in Liberation Square, Baghdad celebrating after a successful election campaign

A total of 6,904 candidates participated in the elections, representing parties:

Governorate	Number of Candidates
Anbar	383
Babil	338
Baghdad	1,985
Basra	522
Duhok	115
Dhi Qar	279
Diyala	259
Erbil	173
Karbala	197
Kirkuk	291
Maysan	105
Muthanna	102
Najaf	244
Nineveh	907
Al-Qadisiyyah	191
Saladin	332
Sulaymaniyah	211
Wasit	180
Minorities	90
Total	6,904

=== Alliances ===
As of 26 December 2017, a total of 204 parties had registered to contest the elections. The deadline for registering coalitions was 11 January 2018. A total of 27 coalitions were registered by the deadline, grouping 143 political parties, with registered parties not part of a coalition also free to contest separately.

The ruling State of Law Coalition, which won the last election in 2014 with 92 seats, contested the election with two separate coalitions. Prime Minister Haider al-Abadi entered the election as head of a coalition called "Victory" (a reference to the victory over Daesh); his predecessor, Vice President Nouri al-Maliki, headed the State of Law list. Members of the Dawa Party, which they both come from, were free to support either list.

Leading members of the Hashd al-Shaabi (Popular Mobilization Forces), mainly Shiite Arab militias who fought alongside the Iraqi army to defeat Daesh from 2014 to 2017, formed an alliance to contest the election. The Fatah Alliance included the Badr Organisation, Asa'ib Ahl al-Haq, Kata'ib Hezbollah and Kata'ib al-Imam Ali—all key components of the Hashd. The Badr Organisation, headed by Hadi Al-Amiri, which had 22 seats, was previously part of the ruling State of Law Coalition from which it announced its withdrawal in December 2017. The Fatah Alliance agreed to run jointly with al-Abadi's Nasr al-Iraq (Victory of Iraq) list, but the agreement fell apart after only 24 hours, reportedly over Abadi's conditions.

Ammar al-Hakim, the leader of the Citizen Alliance, the third largest bloc in parliament, announced in July 2017 that he was leaving the veteran Shiite Islamist party, the Islamic Supreme Council of Iraq -– which he had led since the death of his father, Abdul Aziz al-Hakim –- and forming a new "non-Islamic national movement" called the National Wisdom Movement (al-Hikma). All but five of the 29 MPs from the Citizens Alliance joined Al-Hikma. The remaining members of the Citizen Alliance joined the Fatah Alliance.

Muqtada al-Sadr announced a joint list with the Iraqi Communist Party, called the Alliance towards Reforms. This built on previous collaboration with the Communists since 2016, when they held joint protests in Baghdad against corruption and sectarianism in government.

=== Kurdistan Region ===
Within the Kurdish parties, there had been significant changes since the previous election with the death of both Jalal Talabani, the long-time leader of the Patriotic Union of Kurdistan, the second largest party, and the opposition leader Nawshirwan Mustafa. In September 2017, Barham Salih, a former prime minister of Iraqi Kurdistan and deputy leader of the PUK, announced that he was leaving the party and forming a new opposition party—the Coalition for Democracy and Justice. The party was seen to have the potential to change the Kurdish political landscape. He said he hoped to gather all the other opposition parties, including Gorran and Komal, to challenge the governing KDP–PUK alliance. The three parties formed a coalition called Nishtiman (Homeland) to run in the elections. The ruling KDP–PUK alliance have agreed to run again as a single list and all the Kurdish parties in Kirkuk have discussed running as a single list. However, the KDP announced they would boycott elections in Kirkuk and other areas they described as "under military occupation".

=== Sunni-majority areas ===
Within the Sunni Arab parties, the main Uniters for Reform Coalition (Muttahidoon), led by Osama al-Nujaifi, which won 23 seats in 2014, is running again, although the Iraqi Islamic Party, led by Speaker of Parliament Salim Jabouri, has left this coalition to join up with former prime minister Ayad Allawi's Al-Wataniya and Salah al-Mutlak's Al-Arabiya. The combined list was called Al-Wataniya. Other parties as well have left the Muttahidoon coalition including the al-Hal Party and formed various alliances in the name of the provinces they ran in, such as Salahuddin Our Identity in Saladin Governorate, and Anbar Our Identity in Al Anbar Governorate and Baghdad Alliance in Baghdad.

=== Civil parties ===
Within the nonsectarian parties who aim to establish a civil state, the main alliance formed is the Civilized Alliance, led by Faiq Al Sheikh Ali, which currently has 4 seats. The alliance consists of four liberal, non-sectarian, national parties, the People's Party for Reform, the Al-Etifak National Party, the National Civil Movement and Iraq's National Movement, and includes a number of independent figures. The Civil Democratic Alliance are also running in the elections as another major civil party.

=== Christian parties ===
Of the 329 seats in parliament, five are reserved for the country's Christian minority. One reserved seat is allotted for each of five governorates: Baghdad, Duhok, Erbil, Kirkuk and Nineveh. At the time of voting, only about 200,000 Christians remained in the country.

== Attacks ==
In early May 2018, ISIL claimed to have assassinated Faruq Zarzur al-Juburi, a candidate in the Iraqi elections. The attack reportedly took place in Mosul, outside al-Juburi's house. This was later on proven to be false; due to a family dispute, the candidate was killed by his son.

On election day, a roadside bomb in Kirkuk killed six members of Tribal Mobilization (ar) (a pro-government Sunni tribal force) and injured three police officers.

One Iraqi border guard was killed by a bomb in the outskirts of Khanaqin in Diyala on 13 May.

Two offices linked to Muqtada al-Sadr in Maysan were bombed on 15 May but there were no casualties since both offices were empty at the time. It is still unclear whether the attacks were a response to the parliamentary gains in the election made by Sadr's coalition.

On 16 May, a polling station in Kirkuk was reportedly under siege by gunmen pressuring them to change the results after the PUK was indicated to have won the province.

== Results ==
After the High Electoral Commission announced the results, there were claims of widespread fraud linked to the electronic counting of votes. The Council of Representatives held an emergency session and passed an amendment to the electoral law that cancelled the votes of internally-displaced and overseas voters and mandated a full manual recount for all other votes.

The Commission appealed to the Supreme Court. In a ruling on 21 June, the court upheld the full manual recount but struck down the cancellation of internally-displaced and overseas voters. The final results were released on 9 August, with only minor changes affecting five candidates and two parties.

Party	Votes	%	Seats
Alliance Towards Reform	1,500,832	14.47	54
Fatah Alliance	1,367,561	13.18	48
Victory Alliance	1,136,425	10.95	42
Kurdistan Democratic Party	883,923	8.52	25
State of Law Coalition	724,957	6.99	25
Al-Wataniya	626,638	6.04	21
Patriotic Union of Kurdistan	619,694	5.97	18
National Wisdom Movement	576,806	5.56	19
Iraqi Decision Alliance	367,939	3.55	14
Gorran Movement	201,684	1.94	5
New Generation Movement	185,260	1.79	4
Anbar is Our Identity	144,182	1.39	6
Coalition of Competencies for Change	141,002	1.36	2
Eradaa Movement	138,335	1.33	3
Coalition for Democracy and Justice	123,184	1.19	2
Kurdistan Islamic Union	104,257	1.00	2
Civilized Alliance	99,505	0.96	2
Baghdad Alliance	97,747	0.94	3
Kurdistan Islamic Group	92,245	0.89	2
Arab Alliance in Kirkuk	84,102	0.81	3
Nineveh Is Our Identity	83,102	0.80	3
Turkmen Front of Kirkuk	79,694	0.77	3
National Fortress Coalition	77,624	0.75	3
Solidarity	77,014	0.74	0
Civil Democratic Alliance	71,839	0.69	1
Banners of Benevolence	64,727	0.62	2
National Party of the Masses	54,135	0.52	2
The Passing	50,243	0.48	2
Democratic Approach	37,035	0.36	1
Babylon Movement	33,177	0.32	2
Civic Party	32,496	0.31	1
Saladin Is Our Identity	31,994	0.31	1
Construction and Reform	30,916	0.30	0
Diyala Challenge	26,339	0.25	0
Assembly of the Men of Iraq	25,837	0.25	1
Iraq's Land	22,375	0.22	0
Chaldean Syriac Assyrian Popular Council	20,075	0.19	1
Rafidain List	19,257	0.19	1
Iraqis Gathered for Change	18,962	0.18	0
Chaldean List	16,103	0.16	1
National Movement of the Majority	14,847	0.14	0
Nishtiman Coalition	14,118	0.14	0
Thaar Allah Islamic Party	11,698	0.11	0
Yazidi Democratic Party	11,141	0.11	0
Beth Nahrain Patriotic Union	10,690	0.10	0
Sons of the Two Rivers	10,666	0.10	0
People's Parliament Assembly	9,471	0.09	0
National Federal Party	8,915	0.09	0
Iraqi Salvation Council	8,669	0.08	0
Bab Al-Arab	8,155	0.08	0
Nation of Supporters of Truth	7,594	0.07	0
Shabak Free Movement	6,978	0.07	0
Al-Feyli Front	6,917	0.07	0
National Democratic Party	6,849	0.07	0
Kurdistan Social Democratic Party	6,151	0.06	0
Yazidi Progress Party	6,294	0.06	1
Country List	5,735	0.06	0
National Tribal Movement in Iraq	5,648	0.05	0
Yazidi Freedom and Democracy Party	4,747	0.05	0
Syriac Assembly Movement	4,251	0.04	0
Free Euphrates	3,948	0.04	0
Al-Daae Party	3,850	0.04	0
Communist Party of Kurdistan – Iraq	3,387	0.03	0
Feyli Union Gathering	3,356	0.03	0
Yazidi Movement for Reform and Progress	3,307	0.03	0
Trust Party	3,276	0.03	0
Iraqi Feyli Coalition	3,237	0.03	0
Iraqi Democratic Front	2,489	0.02	0
Righteous Front	2,338	0.02	0
National Certainty Party	1,277	0.01	0
Independent	85,312	0.82	3
Total	10,374,533	100.00	329
Registered voters/turnout	23,140,739	–	

=== By governorate ===
Anbar Governorate
Party	Votes	%	Seats
Anbar is Our Identity	144,182	35.57	6
Al-Wataniya	63,076	15.56	3
Iraqi Decision Alliance	58,576	14.45	2
The Passing	50,243	12.39	2
Victory Alliance	46,513	11.47	2
Alliance Towards Reforms	7,684	1.90	0
Iraqi Salvation Council	6,522	1.61	0
Solidarity	6,164	1.52	0
Free Euphrates	3,948	0.97	0
Iraqis Gathered for Change	3,487	0.86	0
Civilized Alliance	3,273	0.81	0
Banners of Benevolence	3,223	0.80	0
Coalition of Competencies for Change	1,903	0.47	0
National Wisdom Movement	1,506	0.37	0
Fatah Alliance	1,430	0.35	0
Babylon Movement	766	0.19	0
New Generation Movement	752	0.19	0
Independent	422	0.10	0
National Tribal Movement in Iraq	372	0.09	0
Independent	203	0.05	0
Righteous Front	171	0.04	0
Rafidain List	158	0.04	0
Independent	150	0.04	0
Sons of the Two Rivers	130	0.03	0
Chaldean List	122	0.03	0
Independent	107	0.03	0
Independent	67	0.02	0
Independent	65	0.02	0
Beth Nahrain Patriotic Union	55	0.01	0
Independent	46	0.01	0
Syriac Assembly Movement	34	0.01	0
Chaldean Syriac Assyrian Popular Council	30	0.01	0
Total	405,380	100.00	15
Registered voters/turnout	1,027,474	–	

Babylon Governorate
Party	Votes	%	Seats
Fatah Alliance	132,421	22.52	4
Alliance Towards Reforms	123,001	20.92	4
Victory Alliance	88,753	15.09	3
National Wisdom Movement	75,637	12.86	3
State of Law Coalition	61,726	10.50	2
Coalition of Competencies for Change	33,620	5.72	1
Eradaa Movement	23,451	3.99	0
Al-Wataniya	17,264	2.94	0
National Movement of the Majority	14,847	2.52	0
Solidarity	5,542	0.94	0
Civilized Alliance	4,840	0.82	0
Babylon Movement	1,254	0.21	0
Rafidain List	1,069	0.18	0
Independent	771	0.13	0
Independent	584	0.10	0
Independent	454	0.08	0
Sons of the Two Rivers	446	0.08	0
Independent	431	0.07	0
Independent	390	0.07	0
Chaldean List	345	0.06	0
Chaldean Syriac Assyrian Popular Council	338	0.06	0
Beth Nahrain Patriotic Union	329	0.06	0
Syriac Assembly Movement	272	0.05	0
Al-Daae Party	218	0.04	0
Total	588,003	100.00	17
Registered voters/turnout	1,193,512	–	

Baghdad Governorate
Party	Votes	%	Seats
Alliance Towards Reforms	466,137	23.33	17
Fatah Alliance	264,011	13.21	10
State of Law Coalition	236,374	11.83	9
Al-Wataniya	220,457	11.03	8
Victory Alliance	216,185	10.82	8
National Wisdom Movement	100,058	5.01	4
Iraqi Decision Alliance	99,866	5.00	4
Baghdad Alliance	97,747	4.89	3
Banners of Benevolence	50,783	2.54	2
Civilized Alliance	35,148	1.76	1
Civil Democratic Alliance	33,116	1.66	1
Civic Party	32,496	1.63	1
Eradaa Movement	27,550	1.38	1
Coalition of Competencies for Change	21,903	1.10	0
Solidarity	20,588	1.03	0
People's Parliament Assembly	9,471	0.47	0
National Democratic Party	6,849	0.34	0
Iraqis Gathered for Change	5,576	0.28	0
New Generation Movement	5,374	0.27	0
Babylon Movement (Christian Seat)	4,710	0.24	1
Al-Feyli Front	4,549	0.23	0
Rafidain List	4,395	0.22	0
Construction and Reform	3,692	0.18	0
Patriotic Union of Kurdistan	3,462	0.17	0
Trust Party	3,276	0.16	0
Independent (Mandaean Seat)	2,904	0.15	1
Chaldean List	2,535	0.13	0
Sons of the Two Rivers	2,237	0.11	0
Iraqi Salvation Council	2,147	0.11	0
National Tribal Movement in Iraq	1,997	0.10	0
Al-Daae Party	1,766	0.09	0
Independent	1,674	0.08	0
Beth Nahrain Patriotic Union	1,348	0.07	0
Independent	1,267	0.06	0
Independent	1,185	0.06	0
Righteous Front	1,044	0.05	0
Chaldean Syriac Assyrian Popular Council	936	0.05	0
Independent	935	0.05	0
Independent	908	0.05	0
Independent	428	0.02	0
Independent	426	0.02	0
Syriac Assembly Movement	405	0.02	0
Total	1,997,915	100.00	71
Registered voters/turnout	5,480,661	–	

Basra Governorate
Party	Votes	%	Seats
Fatah Alliance	151,616	22.42	6
Alliance Towards Reforms	121,103	17.91	5
Victory Alliance	108,143	15.99	5
State of Law Coalition	94,561	13.98	4
National Wisdom Movement	57,315	8.48	2
Assembly of the Men of Iraq	25,837	3.82	1
Eradaa Movement	23,897	3.53	1
Al-Wataniya	23,274	3.44	1
Construction and Reform	17,836	2.64	0
Civil Democratic Alliance	11,975	1.77	0
Thaar Allah Islamic Party	11,698	1.73	0
Civilized Alliance	8,002	1.18	0
Coalition of Competencies for Change	7,399	1.09	0
Independent	2,367	0.35	0
Babylon Movement	2,004	0.30	0
Independent	1,289	0.19	0
Independent	1,102	0.16	0
Chaldean List	1,017	0.15	0
Independent	970	0.14	0
Independent	821	0.12	0
Independent	767	0.11	0
Sons of the Two Rivers	609	0.09	0
Independent	596	0.09	0
Beth Nahrain Patriotic Union	480	0.07	0
Rafidain List	476	0.07	0
Chaldean Syriac Assyrian Popular Council	475	0.07	0
Independent	341	0.05	0
Syriac Assembly Movement	193	0.03	0
Total	676,163	100.00	25
Registered voters/turnout	1,786,330	–	

Dhi Qar Governorate
Party	Votes	%	Seats
Alliance Towards Reforms	157,763	28.56	6
Fatah Alliance	118,991	21.54	5
State of Law Coalition	83,789	15.17	3
Victory Alliance	81,575	14.77	3
National Wisdom Movement	56,361	10.20	2
Eradaa Movement	20,024	3.63	0
Al-Wataniya	13,577	2.46	0
Coalition of Competencies for Change	7,142	1.29	0
Civil Democratic Alliance	3,516	0.64	0
Civilized Alliance	3,232	0.59	0
Babylon Movement	993	0.18	0
Independent	906	0.16	0
Independent	826	0.15	0
Independent	702	0.13	0
Independent	490	0.09	0
Sons of the Two Rivers	469	0.08	0
Beth Nahrain Patriotic Union	368	0.07	0
Chaldean List	360	0.07	0
Rafidain List	291	0.05	0
Independent	272	0.05	0
Independent	253	0.05	0
Chaldean Syriac Assyrian Popular Council	196	0.04	0
Independent	143	0.03	0
Syriac Assembly Movement	124	0.02	0
Total	552,363	100.00	19
Registered voters/turnout	1,253,036	–	

Diyala Governorate
Party	Votes	%	Seats
Fatah Alliance	108,601	20.19	3
Iraqi Decision Alliance	103,625	19.27	3
Al-Wataniya	84,213	15.66	3
Alliance Towards Reforms	53,923	10.03	2
Victory Alliance	38,690	7.19	1
National Wisdom Movement	29,090	5.41	1
Patriotic Union of Kurdistan	27,416	5.10	1
Diyala Challenge	26,339	4.90	0
State of Law Coalition	20,153	3.75	0
Solidarity	11,929	2.22	0
Kurdistan Democratic Party	10,326	1.92	0
Civil Democratic Alliance	5,123	0.95	0
New Generation Movement	3,471	0.65	0
Country List	2,574	0.48	0
Civilized Alliance	1,459	0.27	0
Al-Daae Party	1,380	0.26	0
Righteous Front	1,123	0.21	0
Al-Feyli Front	969	0.18	0
Independent	834	0.16	0
Babylon Movement	797	0.15	0
Communist Party of Kurdistan – Iraq	711	0.13	0
Iraqis Gathered for Change	655	0.12	0
Independent	595	0.11	0
National Certainty Party	594	0.11	0
Independent	562	0.10	0
Chaldean List	468	0.09	0
Kurdistan Democratic Party	455	0.08	0
Independent	382	0.07	0
Independent	351	0.07	0
Sons of the Two Rivers	321	0.06	0
Independent	276	0.05	0
Beth Nahrain Patriotic Union	258	0.05	0
Independent	182	0.03	0
Total	537,845	100.00	14
Registered voters/turnout	1,010,445	–	

Duhok Governorate
Party	Votes	%	Seats
Kurdistan Democratic Party	353,177	72.33	10
Kurdistan Islamic Union	43,417	8.89	1
Coalition for Democracy and Justice	25,656	5.25	0
Patriotic Union of Kurdistan	25,575	5.24	0
New Generation Movement	18,026	3.69	0
Rafidain List (Christian Seat)	4,077	0.83	1
Gorran Movement	3,797	0.78	0
Kurdistan Islamic Group	3,627	0.74	0
Chaldean Syriac Assyrian Popular Council	3,483	0.71	0
Babylon Movement	1,372	0.28	0
Kurdistan Social Democratic Party	1,256	0.26	0
Sons of the Two Rivers	1,196	0.24	0
Victory Alliance	1,020	0.21	0
Chaldean List	631	0.13	0
Beth Nahrain Patriotic Union	546	0.11	0
Independent	304	0.06	0
Independent	280	0.06	0
Independent	265	0.05	0
Independent	187	0.04	0
Independent	180	0.04	0
Independent	99	0.02	0
Independent	94	0.02	0
Syriac Assembly Movement	41	0.01	0
Total	488,306	100.00	12
Registered voters/turnout	716,300	–	

Erbil Governorate
Party	Votes	%	Seats
Kurdistan Democratic Party	321,833	50.10	8
Patriotic Union of Kurdistan	79,727	12.41	2
New Generation Movement	70,848	11.03	2
Coalition for Democracy and Justice	50,561	7.87	1
Gorran Movement	40,914	6.37	1
Kurdistan Islamic Group	36,855	5.74	1
Kurdistan Islamic Union	24,564	3.82	0
Iraqi Democratic Front	2,489	0.39	0
Beth Nahrain Patriotic Union	2,329	0.36	0
Kurdistan Democratic Party	2,023	0.31	0
Chaldean List (Christian Seat)	1,588	0.25	1
Babylon Movement	1,520	0.24	0
Chaldean Syriac Assyrian Popular Council	1,213	0.19	0
Victory Alliance	919	0.14	0
Sons of the Two Rivers	820	0.13	0
Al-Wataniya	679	0.11	0
Rafidain List	555	0.09	0
Independent	466	0.07	0
National Tribal Movement in Iraq	462	0.07	0
Independent	440	0.07	0
Independent	418	0.07	0
Independent	410	0.06	0
Independent	227	0.04	0
Independent	202	0.03	0
Independent	147	0.02	0
Syriac Assembly Movement	141	0.02	0
Independent	87	0.01	0
Total	642,437	100.00	16
Registered voters/turnout	1,123,219	–	

Karbala Governorate
Party	Votes	%	Seats
Fatah Alliance	76,679	25.21	3
Alliance Towards Reforms	74,820	24.60	3
Victory Alliance	52,674	17.32	2
State of Law Coalition	39,927	13.12	2
National Wisdom Movement	20,388	6.70	1
Coalition of Competencies for Change	12,261	4.03	0
Al-Wataniya	7,646	2.51	0
Civilized Alliance	6,236	2.05	0
New Generation Movement	3,608	1.19	0
Construction and Reform	2,267	0.75	0
Civil Democratic Alliance	2,073	0.68	0
Babylon Movement	1,766	0.58	0
Chaldean List	635	0.21	0
Independent	559	0.18	0
Independent	359	0.12	0
Independent	344	0.11	0
Sons of the Two Rivers	316	0.10	0
Rafidain List	309	0.10	0
Independent	299	0.10	0
Chaldean Syriac Assyrian Popular Council	220	0.07	0
Beth Nahrain Patriotic Union	192	0.06	0
Independent	174	0.06	0
Al-Daae Party	153	0.05	0
Independent	125	0.04	0
Syriac Assembly Movement	106	0.03	0
Independent	72	0.02	0
Total	304,208	100.00	11
Registered voters/turnout	721,416	–	

Kirkuk Governorate
Party	Votes	%	Seats
Patriotic Union of Kurdistan	183,283	37.82	6
Arab Alliance in Kirkuk	84,102	17.35	3
Turkmen Front of Kirkuk	79,694	16.44	3
Victory Alliance	24,328	5.02	0
Fatah Alliance	18,427	3.80	0
Al-Wataniya	14,979	3.09	0
Nishtiman Coalition	14,118	2.91	0
New Generation Movement	13,096	2.70	0
Solidarity	10,621	2.19	0
Bab Al-Arab	8,155	1.68	0
Kurdistan Democratic Party	7,243	1.49	0
Chaldean List	4,864	1.00	0
Kurdistan Islamic Union	4,631	0.96	0
Chaldean Syriac Assyrian Popular Council (Christian Seat)	3,810	0.79	1
Banners of Benevolence	3,088	0.64	0
National Wisdom Movement	2,386	0.49	0
Beth Nahrain Patriotic Union	2,148	0.44	0
Babylon Movement	1,118	0.23	0
Rafidain List	901	0.19	0
Communist Party of Kurdistan – Iraq	884	0.18	0
Coalition of Competencies for Change	700	0.14	0
Independent	423	0.09	0
Sons of the Two Rivers	335	0.07	0
Al-Feyli Front	301	0.06	0
Independent	289	0.06	0
Independent	233	0.05	0
Syriac Assembly Movement	163	0.03	0
Independent	158	0.03	0
Independent	140	0.03	0
Total	484,618	100.00	13
Registered voters/turnout	956,262	–	

Maysan Governorate
Party	Votes	%	Seats
Alliance Towards Reforms	134,430	42.85	5
Fatah Alliance	63,835	20.35	2
National Wisdom Movement	40,237	12.83	1
Victory Alliance	36,412	11.61	1
State of Law Coalition	32,213	10.27	1
Al-Wataniya	1,972	0.63	0
New Generation Movement	952	0.30	0
Independent	633	0.20	0
Independent	585	0.19	0
Babylon Movement	418	0.13	0
Independent	372	0.12	0
Independent	319	0.10	0
Sons of the Two Rivers	241	0.08	0
Independent	221	0.07	0
Rafidain List	195	0.06	0
Beth Nahrain Patriotic Union	193	0.06	0
Independent	191	0.06	0
Chaldean List	122	0.04	0
Chaldean Syriac Assyrian Popular Council	99	0.03	0
Syriac Assembly Movement	48	0.02	0
Independent	44	0.01	0
Total	313,732	100.00	10
Registered voters/turnout	711,585	–	

Muthanna Governorate
Party	Votes	%	Seats
Alliance Towards Reforms	71,058	30.99	2
Fatah Alliance	46,363	20.22	2
Victory Alliance	35,712	15.57	1
National Wisdom Movement	35,685	15.56	1
State of Law Coalition	31,051	13.54	1
Eradaa Movement	3,759	1.64	0
Babylon Movement	1,492	0.65	0
Al-Wataniya	1,113	0.49	0
Construction and Reform	920	0.40	0
Independent	332	0.14	0
Independent	316	0.14	0
Beth Nahrain Patriotic Union	277	0.12	0
Sons of the Two Rivers	255	0.11	0
Independent	231	0.10	0
Independent	161	0.07	0
Independent	122	0.05	0
Rafidain List	114	0.05	0
Chaldean List	78	0.03	0
Independent	77	0.03	0
Chaldean Syriac Assyrian Popular Council	76	0.03	0
Independent	66	0.03	0
Syriac Assembly Movement	51	0.02	0
Total	229,309	100.00	7
Registered voters/turnout	489,763	–	

Najaf Governorate
Party	Votes	%	Seats
Alliance Towards Reforms	92,219	24.58	4
Fatah Alliance	83,070	22.14	3
Victory Alliance	71,971	19.19	3
National Wisdom Movement	38,163	10.17	1
State of Law Coalition	37,057	9.88	1
Eradaa Movement	14,883	3.97	0
Coalition of Competencies for Change	7,815	2.08	0
Nation of Supporters of Truth	7,594	2.02	0
Civilized Alliance	6,041	1.61	0
Al-Wataniya	4,722	1.26	0
Civil Democratic Alliance	3,104	0.83	0
Construction and Reform	1,903	0.51	0
New Generation Movement	1,163	0.31	0
Iraqis Gathered for Change	1,081	0.29	0
Babylon Movement	822	0.22	0
Independent	568	0.15	0
Chaldean List	531	0.14	0
Independent	350	0.09	0
Sons of the Two Rivers	344	0.09	0
Independent	309	0.08	0
Independent	242	0.06	0
Chaldean Syriac Assyrian Popular Council	225	0.06	0
Rafidain List	207	0.06	0
Independent	188	0.05	0
Beth Nahrain Patriotic Union	169	0.05	0
Independent	152	0.04	0
Al-Daae Party	107	0.03	0
Independent	73	0.02	0
Syriac Assembly Movement	69	0.02	0
Total	375,142	100.00	12
Registered voters/turnout	895,877	–	

Nineveh Governorate
Party	Votes	%	Seats
Victory Alliance	168,112	17.89	7
Kurdistan Democratic Party	139,489	14.84	6
Al-Wataniya	104,025	11.07	4
Nineveh Is Our Identity	83,102	8.84	3
Fatah Alliance	75,043	7.99	3
Iraqi Decision Alliance	67,117	7.14	3
National Party of the Masses	54,135	5.76	2
Democratic Approach	37,035	3.94	1
Patriotic Union of Kurdistan	32,789	3.49	1
Civilized Alliance	28,513	3.03	1
Solidarity	14,936	1.59	0
Independent (Shabak Seat)	14,824	1.58	1
National Wisdom Movement	14,800	1.57	0
Yazidi Democratic Party	11,141	1.19	0
Babylon Movement (Christian Seat)	9,753	1.04	1
Chaldean Syriac Assyrian Popular Council	8,406	0.89	0
Alliance Towards Reforms	8,182	0.87	0
Shabak Free Movement	6,978	0.74	0
Yazidi Progress Party (Yazidi Seat)	6,294	0.67	1
Independent	5,962	0.63	0
Rafidain List	5,895	0.63	0
Civil Democratic Alliance	4,836	0.51	0
Yazidi Freedom and Democracy Party	4,747	0.51	0
Coalition of Competencies for Change	4,530	0.48	0
Yazidi Movement for Reform and Progress	3,307	0.35	0
Country List	3,161	0.34	0
New Generation Movement	2,827	0.30	0
Construction and Reform	2,514	0.27	0
Syriac Assembly Movement	2,339	0.25	0
Chaldean List	1,794	0.19	0
Sons of the Two Rivers	1,690	0.18	0
Iraqis Gathered for Change	1,601	0.17	0
Iraq's Land	1,597	0.17	0
Kurdistan Islamic Union	1,348	0.14	0
National Tribal Movement in Iraq	1,169	0.12	0
Beth Nahrain Patriotic Union	1,030	0.11	0
Independent	940	0.10	0
Independent	925	0.10	0
Independent	631	0.07	0
Kurdistan Democratic Party	557	0.06	0
Independent	464	0.05	0
Independent	428	0.05	0
Independent	405	0.04	0
Independent	344	0.04	0
Total	939,715	100.00	34
Registered voters/turnout	2,039,728	–	

Qadisiyyah Governorate
Party	Votes	%	Seats
Fatah Alliance	88,895	24.80	3
Alliance Towards Reforms	73,294	20.45	3
Victory Alliance	59,883	16.71	2
State of Law Coalition	42,878	11.96	1
National Wisdom Movement	42,139	11.76	1
Eradaa Movement	24,771	6.91	1
Civil Democratic Alliance	6,535	1.82	0
Al-Wataniya	4,861	1.36	0
Coalition of Competencies for Change	4,706	1.31	0
Civilized Alliance	2,761	0.77	0
Construction and Reform	1,784	0.50	0
Babylon Movement	1,764	0.49	0
Independent	670	0.19	0
Independent	565	0.16	0
Independent	561	0.16	0
Beth Nahrain Patriotic Union	503	0.14	0
Sons of the Two Rivers	340	0.09	0
Independent	267	0.07	0
Chaldean List	254	0.07	0
Independent	242	0.07	0
Rafidain List	238	0.07	0
Chaldean Syriac Assyrian Popular Council	181	0.05	0
Independent	154	0.04	0
Syriac Assembly Movement	104	0.03	0
Independent	97	0.03	0
Total	358,447	100.00	11
Registered voters/turnout	754,425	–	

Saladin Governorate
Party	Votes	%	Seats
National Fortress Coalition	77,624	19.21	3
Fatah Alliance	64,267	15.91	2
Al-Wataniya	56,325	13.94	2
Victory Alliance	50,898	12.60	2
Iraqi Decision Alliance	38,755	9.59	2
Saladin Is Our Identity	31,994	7.92	1
Iraq's Land	20,778	5.14	0
Alliance Towards Reforms	15,816	3.91	0
National Wisdom Movement	9,851	2.44	0
National Federal Party	8,915	2.21	0
Banners of Benevolence	7,633	1.89	0
Solidarity	7,234	1.79	0
Iraqis Gathered for Change	6,562	1.62	0
Civil Democratic Alliance	1,561	0.39	0
Coalition of Competencies for Change	1,241	0.31	0
New Generation Movement	754	0.19	0
State of Law Coalition	691	0.17	0
Babylon Movement	623	0.15	0
Independent	581	0.14	0
Independent	261	0.06	0
Independent	229	0.06	0
Independent	200	0.05	0
Sons of the Two Rivers	183	0.05	0
Beth Nahrain Patriotic Union	159	0.04	0
Independent	147	0.04	0
Independent	144	0.04	0
Chaldean List	143	0.04	0
Independent	97	0.02	0
Rafidain List	96	0.02	0
Independent	94	0.02	0
Al-Daae Party	80	0.02	0
Chaldean Syriac Assyrian Popular Council	70	0.02	0
Syriac Assembly Movement	13	0.00	0
Total	404,019	100.00	12
Registered voters/turnout	868,440	–	

Sulaymaniyah Governorate
Party	Votes	%	Seats
Patriotic Union of Kurdistan	267,442	39.33	8
Gorran Movement	156,973	23.09	4
New Generation Movement	64,389	9.47	2
Kurdistan Islamic Group	51,763	7.61	1
Kurdistan Democratic Party	48,820	7.18	1
Coalition for Democracy and Justice	46,967	6.91	1
Kurdistan Islamic Union	30,297	4.46	1
Kurdistan Social Democratic Party	4,895	0.72	0
Communist Party of Kurdistan – Iraq	1,792	0.26	0
National Wisdom Movement	1,262	0.19	0
Babylon Movement	1,148	0.17	0
Victory Alliance	818	0.12	0
Independent	547	0.08	0
Al-Wataniya	514	0.08	0
Chaldean List	493	0.07	0
Independent	455	0.07	0
Sons of the Two Rivers	339	0.05	0
Chaldean Syriac Assyrian Popular Council	154	0.02	0
Independent	145	0.02	0
Independent	142	0.02	0
Independent	128	0.02	0
Independent	114	0.02	0
Independent	106	0.02	0
Rafidain List	94	0.01	0
Syriac Assembly Movement	86	0.01	0
Beth Nahrain Patriotic Union	83	0.01	0
Total	679,966	100.00	18
Registered voters/turnout	1,305,211	–	

Wasit Governorate
Party	Votes	%	Seats
Alliance Towards Reforms	101,402	25.54	3
Fatah Alliance	73,912	18.62	2
Victory Alliance	53,819	13.56	2
National Wisdom Movement	51,928	13.08	2
State of Law Coalition	44,537	11.22	1
Coalition of Competencies for Change	37,782	9.52	1
Al-Wataniya	7,941	2.00	0
Independent (Feyli Seat)	5,078	1.28	1
Feyli Union Gathering	3,356	0.85	0
Iraqi Feyli Coalition	3,237	0.82	0
Independent	1,706	0.43	0
Independent	1,667	0.42	0
National Tribal Movement in Iraq	1,648	0.42	0
Independent	1,326	0.33	0
Al-Feyli Front	1,098	0.28	0
Babylon Movement	857	0.22	0
National Certainty Party	683	0.17	0
Independent	608	0.15	0
Independent	570	0.14	0
Independent	564	0.14	0
Independent	514	0.13	0
Independent	493	0.12	0
Sons of the Two Rivers	395	0.10	0
Independent	387	0.10	0
Independent	310	0.08	0
Beth Nahrain Patriotic Union	223	0.06	0
Rafidain List	187	0.05	0
Chaldean Syriac Assyrian Popular Council	163	0.04	0
Al-Daae Party	146	0.04	0
Independent	142	0.04	0
Chaldean List	123	0.03	0
Independent	101	0.03	0
Syriac Assembly Movement	62	0.02	0
Total	396,965	100.00	12
Registered voters/turnout	807,055	–	

== Government formation ==
On 8 June 2018, a formal agreement was signed by the leaders of the Alliance towards Reforms (Saairun) and the National Coalition (Wataniya) to become the largest bloc in the Council of Representatives. The bloc is calling for economic reform, consolidation of democracy, and political decentralization. A spokesman for Wataniya said that the agreement would be a prelude to other forces joining the alliance, and that serious talks were underway with the National Wisdom Movement (Hikma), the Kurdistan Democratic Party, the Fatah Alliance, and the Decision Alliance (Muttahidoon) as an alliance of these six electoral coalitions would constitute a majority that could form a government.

Al-Sadr announced on 12 June that he had formed an alliance with Fatah, while maintaining an alliance with Al-Wataniya. Prime Minister Abadi later met with Al Sadr on 23 June. Al Sadr afterwards announced he had formed "a cross-sectarian, cross-ethnic alliance" with Abadi and that it would speed up the formation of a new government. Abadi also announced that the new alliance between his Victory Alliance's and Al Sadr's Alliance towards Reforms "is not in contrast to any other alliances either of the two lists have previously entered into with other blocs, rather, it flows in the same direction and same principles."

The final results of the election were announced on 9 August, starting the process to form the government. Parliament convened on 3 September, but were unable to elect a speaker due to rivalries between two blocs who both claimed to be the largest coalition, entitled to nominate the prime minister. Al-Abadi presented an alliance with Saairun, Wataniya, Hikma and other smaller lists who between then held a majority of seats. However, Fatah also claimed to have a majority, based on an alliance with State of Law and with members of Abadi's coalition who had defected.

Two weeks later parliament reconvened and elected a speaker in a secret ballot, with candidates from each of the rival blocs. Muhammad al-Halbusi, a Sunni Arab (as per the Iraqi tradition of muḥāṣaṣah) but backed by Fatah was elected.

At the same time, violent protests occurred in Basra and other cities in the south over polluted water—which had hospitalised tens of thousands of people—and the lack of reliable electricity. Religious leaders called for a new prime minister who hadn't been in government before. Abadi announced on 13 September 2018 that he would respect this call and not run for a second term as prime minister.

The vote for the president took place on 2 October. Previously, the president had always been a member of the second-largest Kurdish party, the Patriotic Union of Kurdistan, under an agreement with the Kurdistan Democratic Party whereby the KDP would be president of Iraqi Kurdistan. However, the KDP fielded a separate candidate, Fuad Hussein, insisting that they had the right to the Presidency as the largest party. Both candidates went to a vote in the parliament, with the PUK's Barham Salih winning. He immediately nominated independent Shi'ite Adil Abdul-Mahdi, a former oil minister seen as acceptable to all parties and to both Iran and the United States, as prime minister-designate.
