= Victory Alliance =

Victory Alliance ائتلاف النصر
- Leader: Haider al-Abadi
- Founded: 14 December 2017; 8 years ago
- Dissolved: January 5th 2021
- Split from: State of Law Coalition
- Merged into: Alliance of Nation State Forces
- Ideology: Moderation; Nonsectarianism; Pragmatism; Islamic democracy
- Political position: Centre
- Council of Representatives: 11 / 329

The Victory Alliance (Arabic: ائتلاف النصر, romanized: iʾtilāf al-naṣr) was a Muslim democratic Iraqi political alliance established by former Iraqi Prime Minister Haider al-Abadi.

== History ==
The alliance was founded on 14 December 2017 by former Iraqi Prime Minister Haider al-Abadi. Although a coalition was initially created between the Conquest Alliance and the Victory Alliance, (named Victory for Iraq), on 15 January the Conquest Alliance withdrew because they would not have gained as many seats and some groups involved in the Victory Alliance were alleged to be involved in corruption.

== Electoral results ==
Election	Votes	%	Seats	+/–	Position	Government
2018	1,136,425	10.95%	42 / 329	New	3rd	Support

== See also ==
- Alliance Towards Reforms
- Fatah Alliance
- National Wisdom Movement
- State of Law Coalition
