= Baghdad Alliance =

The Baghdad Alliance (Arabic: تحالف بغداد, Tahaluf Baghdad) is an Iraqi electoral coalition formed to contest the 2018 general election. The party is a Sunni-based party. It is headed by the Secretary-General of the Sons of the Iraq Unit Mahmoud al-Mashhadani.
