= Yazidi Movement for Reform and Progress =

- Leader: Amin Farhan Jejo
- Founded: November 2004
- Ideology: Yazidi interests
- Religion: Yazidism
- Seats in the Council of Representatives of Iraq: 0 / 328

Party flag

The Yazidi Movement for Reform and Progress (Arabic: الحركة الأيزيدية من أجل الإصلاح والتقدم, Kurdish: Pêkhateya Êzidî) is a Yazidi political party in Iraq. The party represents Yazidis in the Nineveh Governorate. It has retained one seat in the Council of Representatives since 2005.

== Election results ==
Election	Votes	%	Results
January 2005 general elections	4,326	0.1%	0
December 2005 general elections	21,908	0.2%	1
2010 general elections	10,171	0.1%	1
2014 general elections	14,910	0.1%	1
2018 general elections	11,141	0.1%	1
2021 general elections	1,791	0%	0

== See also ==
- List of political parties in Iraq
