= Civil Democratic Alliance =

Political coalition in Iraq

Civil Democratic Alliance التحالف المدني الديمقراطي
- Leader: Ali Khathem Aziz
- Founded: 11 December 2013
- Headquarters: Al-Nethal Street, Baghdad
- Ideology: Secularism; Nonsectarianism; Anti-corruption; Third Way
- Political position: Centre-left
- Colours: Orange, blue
- Seats in the Council of Representatives of Iraq: 0 / 328

The Civil Democratic Alliance (Arabic: التحالف المدني الديمقراطي, Al-Taḥalof Al-Madani Al-Democrati) is an Iraqi political coalition formed by various civil and democratic parties as well as independent figures for the 2014 Iraqi parliamentary election.

The alliance split in 2017 when the Iraqi Communist Party left the alliance after reaching an agreement with the Alliance towards Reforms (Saairun) for the May-2018 election. The Civil Democratic Alliance then split into two alliances, the current consisting of mostly socialist left-wing parties who stayed part of the alliance and are led by the Social Democratic current.

The second alliance formed in December-2017 includes centrist liberal & national democratic parties led by the People's Party for Reform of Faiq Al Sheikh Ali. The new Alliance was called the Civilized Alliance and includes the National Civil Movement of Shirouk Al Abayachi, the Iraqi National Movement and the Al-Etifak National Party as well as various independent figures. The new alliance aims to establish a civil state based on justice and equal rights & duties for all citizens adopting liberal principles characterized by free & fair elections, separation of powers and the rule of law, ensuring equal protection of human rights, and civil & political freedoms for all.

== 2014 Parliamentary Election ==
In the Iraqi 2014 parliamentary election the Civil Democratic Alliance composed of several political blocs:

- People's Party for Reform led by Faiq Al Sheikh Ali.
- Iraqi Ummah Party led by Mithal al-Alusi.
- Iraqi Liberal Party
- The Social democratic current
- National Democratic Party
- National Democratic Action Party
- Democratic Action Movement

The alliance received roughly 240,000 votes in all of Iraq but managed to win four seats only. Three seats were in Baghdad Governorate where the alliance received 112,563 votes. The parliamentary representatives are:

- Mithal al-Alusi - Leader of the Iraqi Ummah Party who received 30,054 votes arriving fifth in Baghdad out of seventy one seats.
- Faiq Al Sheikh Ali - Secretary-General of the People's Party for Reform who received 24,256 votes, arriving sixth in Baghdad out of seventy one seats.
- Shirouk Al-Abaychi - Secretary-General of the National Civil Movement, 1417 votes.
- Joseph Sylawa - from the Warkaa' Christian bloc aliened with the Civil Democratic Alliance.

== 2018 Parliamentary Election ==
The alliance won 1 seat in the 2018 parliamentary election. However, their elected MP soon defected to Alliance Towards Reforms.

== Election results ==
=== Council of Representatives elections ===
Election	Leader	Votes	%	Seats	+/–	Position	Government
2014	Ali Khathem Aziz	112,563	0.86%	3 / 328	New	▲18th	Opposition
2018	Ali Khathem Aziz	71,839	0.69%	1 / 329	▼2	▼25th	Opposition
2021	Ali Khathem Aziz	9,540	0.11%	0 / 329	▼1	▼57th	Extra-parliamentary
2025	Ali Khathem Aziz	9,069	0.08%	0 / 329	0	▲52th	Extra-parliamentary
