= Eradaa Movement =

Eradaa Movement حركة إرادة
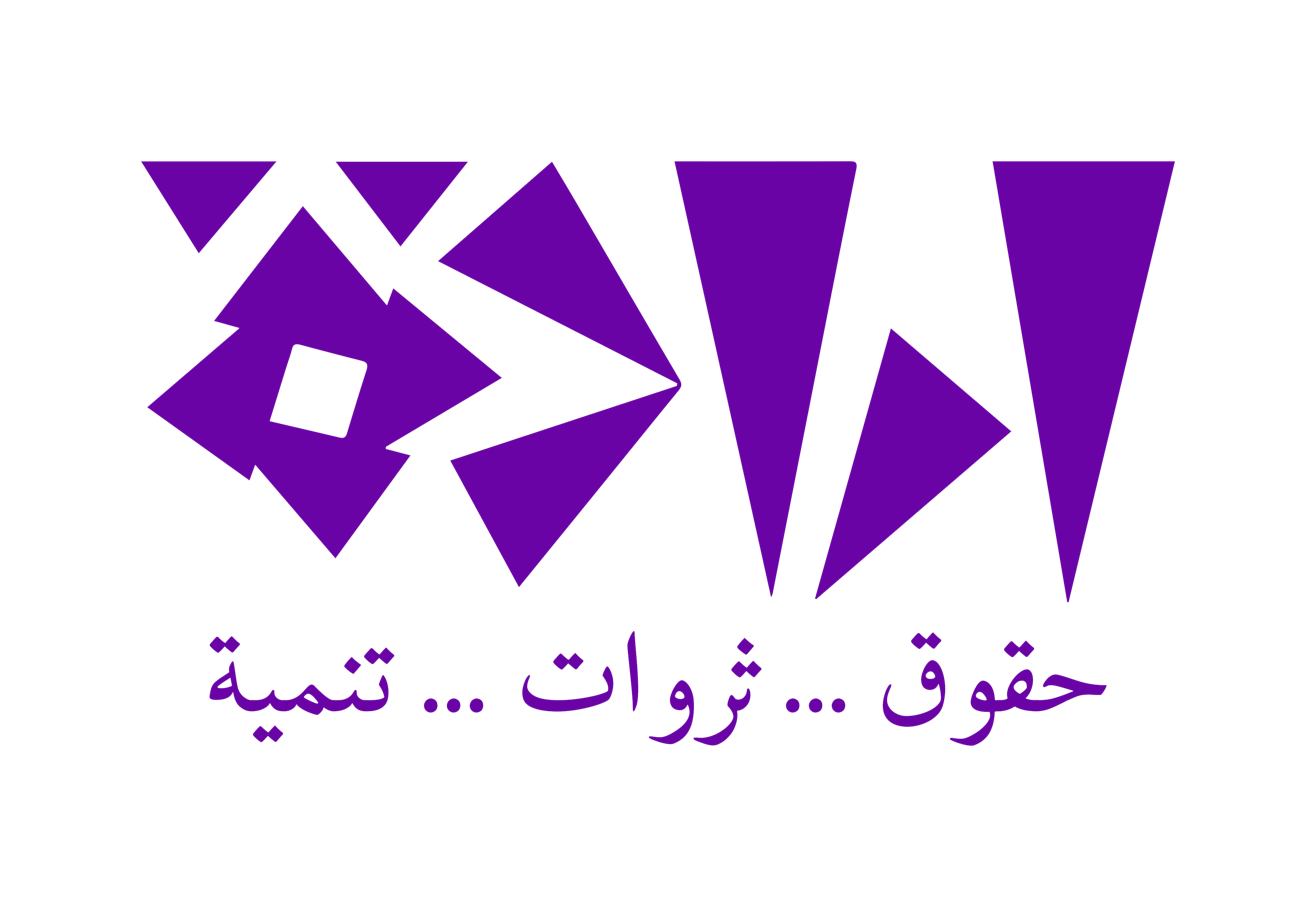
- Chairman: Hanan Saeed Mohsen al-Fatlawi
- Founders: Hanan Saeed Mohsen al-Fatlawi
- Founded: 2015; 11 years ago
- Split from: State of Law Coalition
- Headquarters: Baghdad
- Ideology: Islamic democracy
- Religion: Shia Islam
- National affiliation: National Wisdom Movement (2021); State of Law Coalition (2021-2023); Reconstruction and Development Coalition (2025-present)
- Colours: Green, red
- Council of Representatives: 1 / 329

The Eradaa Movement, (Arabic: حركة إرادة), is an Iraqi political party established by Iraqi MP Hanan Saeed Mohsen al-Fatlawi.

== History ==
This political party was founded on March 15, 2015 by Iraqi MP Hanan Saeed Mohsen al-Fatlawi. The party won the first official party to be granted the "Eradaa Movement" of Hanan Saeed Mohsen al-Fatlawi from Independent High Electoral Commission.

== Electoral results ==
Election	Votes	%	Seats	+/–	Position	Government
2018	138,335	1.33%	3 / 329	New	14th	Opposition
2025	As part of RDC		1 / 329	▼1	▲1st	TBA

== See also ==
- List of Islamic political parties
