= Al-Muwatin =

Defunct Iraqi electoral alliance

Citizen Alliance ائتلاف المواطن
- Leader: Ammar al-Hakim
- Founded: 2 March 2013
- Dissolved: 2017
- Preceded by: Islamic Supreme Council of Iraq; Al-Mehraab Martyr List
- Succeeded by: National Wisdom Movement
- Ideology: Shia Islamism
- Religion: Shia Islam

Citizen Alliance (Arabic: ائتلاف المواطن, romanized: Al-Muwatin) was an Iraqi electoral coalition led by Ammar al-Hakim. It was announced in March 2013 by the Islamic Supreme Council of Iraq and allied political groups, initially for the 2013 governorate council elections. The alliance later contested the 2014 Iraqi parliamentary election, in which it won 29 seats in the Council of Representatives of Iraq.

The coalition was closely associated with the Islamic Supreme Council of Iraq and served as its main electoral list during this period. After al-Hakim left the council in 2017 and founded the National Wisdom Movement, most of the Citizen parliamentary bloc moved into the new movement, which became his principal political vehicle.

== History ==
=== Formation ===
Al-Muwatin was announced on 2 March 2013 by Ammar al-Hakim, then head of the Islamic Supreme Council of Iraq. Iraqi and regional reports described it as a coalition formed with more than twenty political entities, including Tayyar Bada'na and the Iraqi National Congress. The coalition was presented as an electoral list for the governorate council elections and campaigned under the slogan "My governorate first".

The alliance followed earlier ISCI-linked electoral lists, including the Al-Mehraab Martyr List. A Congressional Research Service report later described the 2014 Muwatin list as an ISCI list that included figures such as Bayan Jabr and Ahmed Chalabi, along with politicians from Basra Governorate.

=== 2014 parliamentary election ===
Al-Muwatin contested the 2014 parliamentary election as list number 273. It won 29 of the 328 seats in the Council of Representatives, placing it among the main Shia-led electoral lists in that election.

The Guardian reported that Ammar al-Hakim's Al-Muwatin bloc came behind the State of Law Coalition and ahead of the main Sadrist list in the final results. The CRS table of major coalitions in the 2014 election also listed Muwatin as the Citizens Coalition, identified it as an ISCI list, and gave it 29 seats.

=== Transition to the National Wisdom Movement ===
On 24 July 2017, Ammar al-Hakim resigned from the leadership of the Islamic Supreme Council of Iraq and announced the creation of the National Wisdom Movement. The move created a major split within ISCI and shifted much of al-Hakim's parliamentary and organisational support away from the Citizen Alliance structure.

Following the announcement, members of the Citizen parliamentary bloc formed a new Wisdom parliamentary bloc, while a smaller group of MPs remained outside the new formation. In the 2018 Iraqi parliamentary election, al-Hakim's new political vehicle contested the election as the National Wisdom Movement and won 19 seats.

== Members ==
Publicly reported members and figures associated with the coalition included:

- Islamic Supreme Council of Iraq – led by Ammar al-Hakim
- Iraqi National Congress – led by Ahmed Chalabi
- Tayyar Bada'na – led by Jawad al-Bulani
- Figures associated with Bayan Jabr and ISCI-linked networks in southern Iraq

== See also ==
- List of Islamic political parties
- Islamic Supreme Council of Iraq
- Al-Mehraab Martyr List
- National Wisdom Movement
