= Internally displaced persons in Iraq =

The number of people who are currently displaced inside Iraq is estimated to be 3 million, almost one out of every ten Iraqis. This figure is cumulative and represents both those displaced before and after the 2003 US-led invasion. Displacement in Iraq is "chronic and complex:" since the 1960s Iraq has produced the largest population of Internally Displaced Persons (IDPs) and refugees of any state in the Middle East.

Under the Ba'athist regime, an estimated 1.2 million people were internally displaced as a result of factors that include the Iran–Iraq War and policies of forced displacement that were intended to quell resistance and consolidate the control of territory, particularly in the Kurdish northern and Shiite southern area.

In the period directly following the 2003 invasion, population displacement was largely the result of US-led military operations against insurgents, especially in Sunni areas. Such displacements were generally temporary.

Internal displacement increased dramatically after the February 2006 bombing of the Al-Askari Mosque in Samarra. Rising sectarian violence contributed to the displacement of approximately 1.5 million Iraqis between 2006 and 2009, bringing the total displaced population to around 2.7 million.

Since August 2014, and the expansion of ISIS in Iraq, the number of internally displaced Iraqis has risen from 1.7 to 3 million, peaking at 3.4 million in March 2016 .

Persistent insecurity and other factors have prevented many Iraqis from returning to their homes, but people are slowly beginning to return.

Estimates rely heavily on the number of people who have registered as IDPs with the government or with assistance organizations. Registration remains voluntary, however, and requires documentation that displaced persons may lack.

== Demographics ==
According to the Iraqi Red Crescent Society, over 80% of the displaced are women and young children. (IRCS June 2008). IDMC reports that most displaced women are single or unaccompanied, and the elderly also make a large part of the displaced population.

Approximately 58% of IDPs are Sunni Arabs, 29% are Shi'a Arabs, and 13% are minorities such as Shabaks, Christians, Armenians, and others.

Baghdad is the center of post-2003 displacement: around 60% of Iraqis displaced since then have come from Baghdad, and the city also hosts around 40% of the displaced population. Fleeing or fearing sectarian violence, many Baghdad residents left their homes to move to neighborhoods inhabited by those of the same religious, tribal, or sectarian group. This process has led to the homogenization of communities in the capital city and throughout the country.

Driven by the crisis in Mosul, Ninema and Dohuk governorates are currently the source of the largest number of IDPs in Iraq . Many displaced persons have also resettled in the Kurdish region of Iraq, but persistent tensions over governorate borders in this multi-ethnic area have caused further population displacements.

== Barriers to return ==
Of those who have been internally displaced in the post-Saddam era, approximately 300,000 have returned home. Millions of Iraqis remain displaced within the borders of Iraq and in neighboring countries.

Security concerns continue to affect displaced populations. Despite the general decrease in conflict since 2006–07, political uncertainties and the persistence of bombings, kidnappings and other incidents of violence – including those that target Christians and other minorities – have deterred people from trying to return home. The homogenization of neighborhoods along ethnic or sectarian lines may also contribute to the reluctance on the part of former inhabitants to return to the communities from which they fled.

The quality of life in Iraq has decreased dramatically since 2003 and therefore economic and livelihood factors also play a major role in the complex decision-making processes of displaced Iraqis. Unemployment is endemic in Iraq and many IDPs, particularly women, do not have adequate access to employment opportunities. Many have also had their homes destroyed or occupied by others and must find alternative sources of shelter for themselves and their families. UNHCR estimates that over one million internally displaced Iraqis need assistance with food and shelter. In many neighborhoods, access to essential services such as clean water, electricity, basic health care, and education is still inadequate. Such challenges may create barriers not only to return but to subsistence.

A third barrier to return is the challenge of resolving land disputes. The Government of Iraq has taken measures to restore private property ownership and to resolve conflicts over land, but these policies so far have had a limited impact.

Interviews with Iraqi IDPs have revealed that, given the security and socio-economic barriers to return, many would prefer to integrate into their new communities or to relocate somewhere else.

== Policy of the Iraqi government ==
Iraq established the Ministry of Displacement and Migration (MoDM) in August 2003 in order to assist IDPs, refugees, and returnees. MoDM has established a presence in most governorates and has worked to facilitate the process of registration and return throughout Iraq. Nevertheless, critics of MoDM allege that it was unprepared to handle the post-2006 surge in displacement, and that it currently lacks the manpower, expertise, and resources to be effective and to coordinate and strategize large-scale returns in the future. Earlier this year, Azhar Al-Mousawi, Deputy Minister for Displacement and Migration, revealed that the Iraqi government had allocated MoDM only $250 million of the $416–500 million needed to implement its programs.

In partnership with organizations such as UNHCR, various types of centers have been established, particularly in Baghdad, to provide protection, registration, legal advice, financial assistance, and referrals to displaced persons. Registered IDPs may receive a financial assistance package valued at around $850. Those living in formerly occupied residences may receive a six-month rental assistance package to vacate the lot so that former residents can return. Despite such incentives, the rate of registration and application for assistance among IDPs remains low, as does the rate of applicants actually receiving aid.

The Government of Iraq has also taken steps to resolve disputes over private property that have impeded the ability of displaced persons to return. The Commission for the Resolution of Real Property Disputes was established in 2006 to handle disputes arising from the time of the Baathist regime. In 2009, only 1,000 of the 152,000 claims it received had resulted in an enforced decision. This commission is scheduled to be replaced by another that will also take property destruction that occurred under the Saddam regime into account. Similar provisions have been made to address post-2003 land disputes (Order 101) despite this, most claims from both the pre and post-2003 eras remain unresolved. Challenges also include addressing issues such as destroyed property, loss of businesses, and land sales made under duress. Some have argued that government policies towards IDPs have focused on return, and that little support has been offered for displaced persons who wish to integrate locally or to resettle elsewhere. The official government plan for 2011 mentions assistance for integration and resettlement as well as return. In 2008, MoDM introduced a National Policy on Displacement that outlined the rights of Iraqi IDPs and the duties of the Iraq government towards its displaced population. This policy has not yet been passed into law, nor have plans yet been made to implement it.
