= Fatah Alliance =

Political coalition in Iraq

Fatah Alliance ائتلاف الفتح
- Leader: Hadi Al-Amiri
- Founded: 2018
- Dissolved: 2025
- Split from: State of Law Coalition
- Ideology: Shia Islamism
- Political position: Big tent; Factions: Right-wing to far-right
- Religion: Shia Islam
- National affiliation: Building Alliance
- International affiliation: Axis of Resistance
- Colors: Dark green Marigold

Election symbol
- Lion

Website
- www.alfateh.iq

The Fatah Alliance (Arabic: ائتلاف الفتح, romanized: iʾtilāf al-fatḥ), also sometimes translated as the Conquest Alliance, was a political coalition in Iraq formed to contest the 2018 general election. The main components are groups involved in the Popular Mobilization Forces which is mainly a state-sponsored umbrella organization made up of Iraqi Shiite Muslims who fought from 2014 to 2017 alongside the Iraqi Army to defeat ISIL. It is led by Hadi Al-Amiri, the leader of the Badr Organization.

== Members ==
The Fatah Alliance included the Badr Organization, the Al-Sadiqoun Bloc (the political wing of Asa'ib Ahl al-Haq, AAH), Kata'ib Hezbollah and Kata'ib al-Imam Ali, all key components of the Hashd. The Fatah Alliance agreed to run jointly with al-Abadi's Nasr al-Iraq (Victory of Iraq) list, but the agreement fell apart after only 24 hours, reportedly over Abadi's conditions. The Badr Organisation, headed by Hadi Al-Amiri, was previously part of the ruling State of Law Coalition and announced their withdrawal from the Alliance in December 2017, and won 22 seats.

Asa'ib Ahl al-Haq split from the Sadrist Movement in 2004. It has also been one of the main Iraqi armed groups active in the Syrian Civil War. They have received funding and training from Iran's Quds Force and, like many Sadrists, are reported to have religious allegiance to the Iranian Grand Ayatollah Kazem al-Haeri. AAH formed a political wing, called the Al-Sadiqoun Bloc, to contest the 2014 Iraqi parliamentary election, winning one seat.

== Electoral results ==
=== Iraqi Parliament ===
They were expected to win 37 seats in the parliament in 2018 elections, according to one opinion poll.

Election	Votes	%	Seats	+/–	Position
2018	1,366,789	13.16%	48 / 329	New	2nd
2021	462,800	5.23%	17 / 329	▼31	▼5th

== See also ==
- List of Islamic political parties
- Alliance Towards Reforms
- Victory Alliance
