= Amin Farhan Jejo =

Yazidi politician and author

Amin Farhan Jejo (Arabic: أمين فرحان جيجو; also Ameen Farhan Jejo) is a Yazidi politician and author.

== Career ==
Amin Farhan Jejo was one of the leaders of the Yazidi-interest party, Yazidi Movement for Reform and Progress. In December 2005, Amin Farhan Jejo was given a seat in the Iraqi parliament when his Yazidi Movement for Reform and Progress party won 0.2 percent of the country's vote.

== Works ==
Amin Farhan Jejo published books about Yazidi nationalism and the Yazidi language. One of his books is titled The Yezidi Nationalism: Its Roots, Constituents and Sufferings and another of his books is titled The Origins of the Yezidi Language.
