= Shursh =

Shursh (Kurdish: شۆڕش, romanized: şoreş, lit. 'Revolution') was an Iraqi Kurdish communist organization. It emerged in 1945, out of the Kurdish section of the erstwhile Wahdat an-Nidal group (the Arab section Wadhat an-Nidal had merged with the Iraqi Communist Party in 1945). The Kurdish section, continuing as Shursh, had refused to merge into the Iraqi Communist Party.

Shursh played an important role in the formation of the Kurdish Freedom Party (also known as the 'Rizgari Kurd Party') in 1946. When the Kurdish Democratic Party was founded in August 1946, the majority of the Kurdish Freedom Party and a sector of Shursh merged into it. Other elements of Shursh either disbanded or joined the Iraqi Communist Party. Amongst those who joined the Iraqi Communist Party were Jamal al-Haidari, Salih al-Haidari, Hamid Uthman and Nafi Yunus.
