= Wahdat an-Nidal =

Wahdat an-Nidal (Arabic: وحدة النضال, 'Unity of the Struggle') was a communist group in Iraq, known by the publication it issued under that name in Arabic and Kurdish. The group emerged in September 1944 through the merger of the Ila al-Aman and Shararah factions.

In 1945 the Arab section of Wahdat an-Nidal dissolved itself and its members joined the Iraqi Communist Party (the Communist Party had refused to merge with the group, instead demanding that the group dissolve, deposition its literature and printing equipment with the party and its members join the part as individuals). The Kurdish section refused to disband itself, and converted itself into the Shursh group.
