= Unified Popular Front =

1950s Iraqi political party

The Unified Popular Front (Arabic: الجبهة الشعبية المتحدة) was a political party in Iraq. The party was licensed on May 26, 1951. Immediately after being legalized, the party began cooperating with other opposition parties. It was especially close to the National Democratic Party.

The party was banned along with all other political parties during the interim government of General Nureddin Mahmud. However, the party continued to exist for some time and launched candidates for the 1953 election, with the support of other opposition forces. In the election the candidates of the party won eleven out of 138 seats.
