= Emtidad Movement =

Extension Movement حركة امتداد بزووتنەوەی درێژکردنەوە
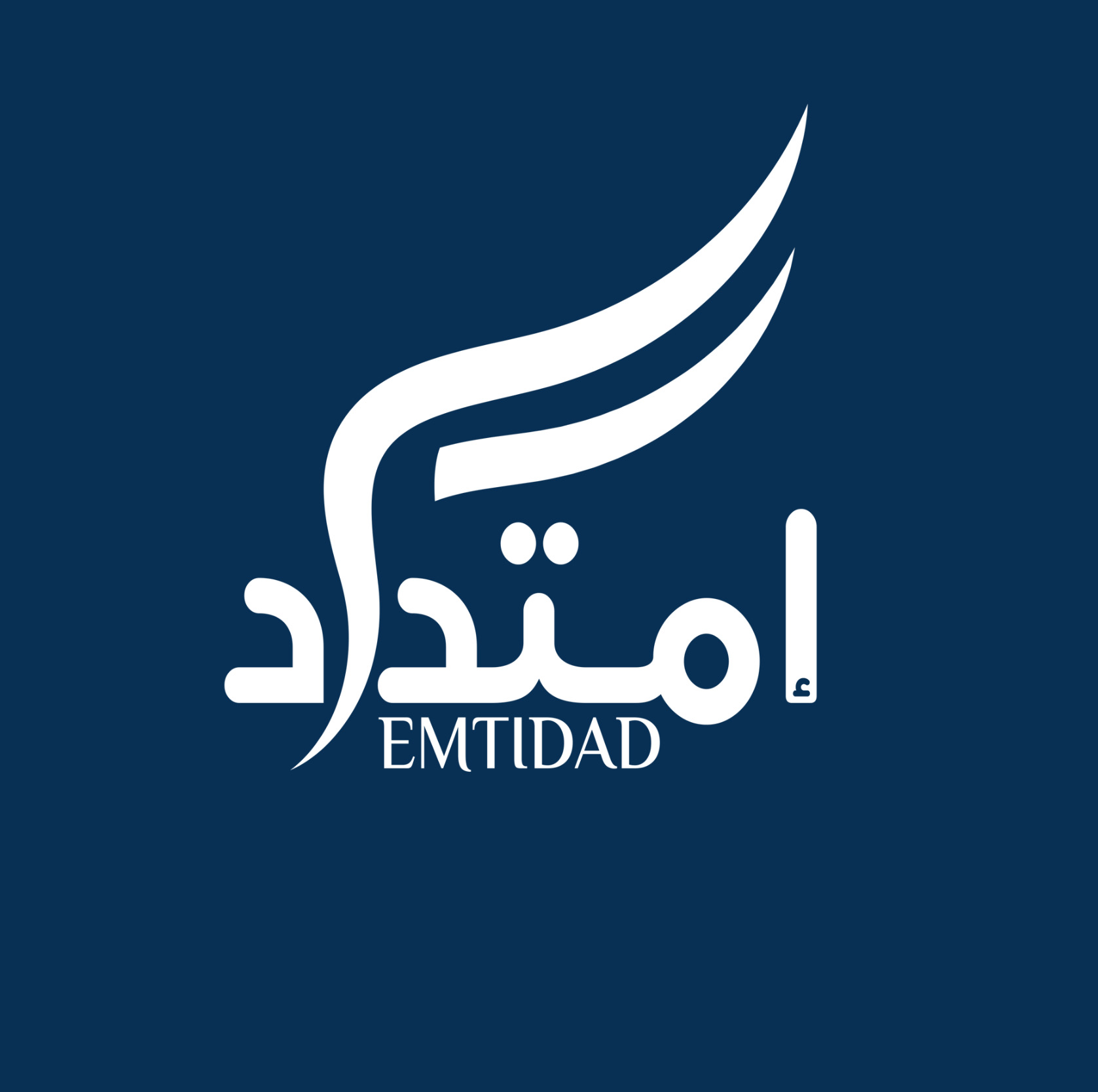
- Abbreviation: EMT (unofficial)
- Leader: Alaa Al Rikabi
- Spokesperson: Manar Obaidi
- Founder: Alaa Al Rikabi
- Founded: 1 December 2020; 5 years ago
- Ideology: Moderation; Liberalism; Secularism; Reformism; Iraqi nationalism Nonsectarianism
- Political position: Centre
- Seats in the Council of Representatives: 0 / 329

The Emtidad Movement or Emtidad (Arabic: حركة امتداد, romanized: Harakat Emtidad), also sometimes translated as the Extension Movement, was an Iraqi political party formed to contest the 2021 parliamentary election.

== Foundation ==
The party was formed in early December 2020 by Alaa Al Rikabi, a doctor and civil activist with other civil activists inside a tent in Al-Habboubi Square, the stronghold of the 2019–2021 Iraqi protests in the center of Dhi Qar Governorate. The idea was establishing a youth civil movement as an alternative to the current political parties that have failed to run the country and have been implicated in crimes of financial corruption, fueling sectarianism and racism, and creating various crises in the country since 2003. The announcement of the movement came in January 2021 and was called "extension", indicating that the movement's premise stemmed from the demands of the protesters, who demanded the end of sectarianism and state corruption.

== History ==
The Kurdish New Generation Movement and Emtidad, together with a group of independents, announced the formation of the ''For the People Alliance'' on December 16, 2021. The alliance consists of 18 MPs. Another five MPs who ran as independents together constitute the ''Independent Popular Bloc.''

Emtidad has been internally divided over the issue of political participation with established political parties. After Emtidad Secretary-General Alaa Al Rikabi stated Emtidad would support the re-election of Mohamed Al-Halbousi as speaker of parliament, Nour Ali Nafeh al-Jalihawi resigned her membership in the party in protest. At the point of the election she was the youngest person ever to hold a parliamentary seat.

Five members left the Emtidad Movement on May 19, 2022, to become independent members of parliament. The MPs left in protest over Alaa Al Rikabi's leadership of the party. A day later, the Imtidad Movement's General Secretariat relieved Rikabi from his position as Secretary-General.

== Electoral results ==
=== 2021 Iraqi parliamentary election ===
Although the movement got nearly 300,000 votes, that turned out to be only by nine seats due to the bad distribution of candidates in the polls. The amount of seats however increased from nine to 16; this was due to the resignation of the Sadrist MPS freeing up 73 spaces in parliament to those who got second most votes. However, the movement suffered many splits leading to many members leaving due to internal disagreements. With many accusations of betrayal and growing corruption.

Election	Votes	%	Seats	+/–	Position	Government
2021	299,303	3.38%	9 / 329	New	9th	
