= Hanan Saeed Mohsen al-Fatlawi =

Iraqi politician

Hanan Saeed Mohsen al-Fatlawi حنان الفتلاوي
- Incumbent
- Assumed office 15 July 2004

Personal details
- Born: حنان سعيد محسن الفتلاوي; July 1, 1968 (age 58) Babil, Iraq
- Party: Eradaa Movement
- Education: Baghdad University
- Website: www.drhananalfatlawi.com/ar

Dr. Hanan Saeed Mohsen al-Fatlawi often called Hanan Al Fatlawi (Arabic:حنان سعيد محسن الفتلاوي) (born 1 July 1968) is an Iraqi politician who served as a deputy in the Iraqi parliament. She is the founder and leader of the Eradaa Movement.

== Biography ==
Hanan Al Fatlawi was born in Babylon. She graduated from Baghdad University in 1992 with a degree in Dermatology and Venereology. She worked as a doctor from 1992 until the invasion of Iraq in 2003. A 4th term MP (including the temporary councils), in 2004 she was the only representative from Babil province in the first council and as a member of Women and Health Committee. In 2005, she was elected as a member of the Transitional National Assembly that wrote the Iraqi constitution, and she served as Chairwoman of Regions and Governorates Affairs Committee. After the end of her second term, she worked as a member of the Advisory Commission to Prime Minister Nouri al-Maliki, also in the field of regions of governorates affairs from 2006 to 2010.

In 2010, she re-elected to the Council of Representatives with the State of Law Coalition where she was a member of the Affairs and Parliamentary Development Committee. In the 2014 elections, she received more votes than any other woman MP (90,781 votes) and finished ahead of all candidates, men and women, in Babil province. She was the first woman among 100 hopefuls in the presidential elections, and passed the first round of elections. She eventually withdrew her names at the request of the National Alliance. In 2015, she founded the political movement named “Eraada” (Determination) which is the first such movement, in Iraq headed by a woman. She is a member of Foreign Relations Committee and is chairwoman of the Iraqi- British Friendship Committee.

She has taken part in many conferences inside Iraq, and represented her country abroad in many conferences. She has also submitted several papers about women and terrorism, federalism, the Iraqi constitution, women rights in the constitution, and the political system in Iraq, among other topics.

== Positions ==
- Member of the Foreign Relations Committee of the Iraqi Parliament
- Member of the Foreign Affairs Committee
- Deputy of Babil Province
- Founder and leader of Eradaa Movement
