= People's Party (Iraq) =

People's Party for Reform حزب الشعب للإصلاح
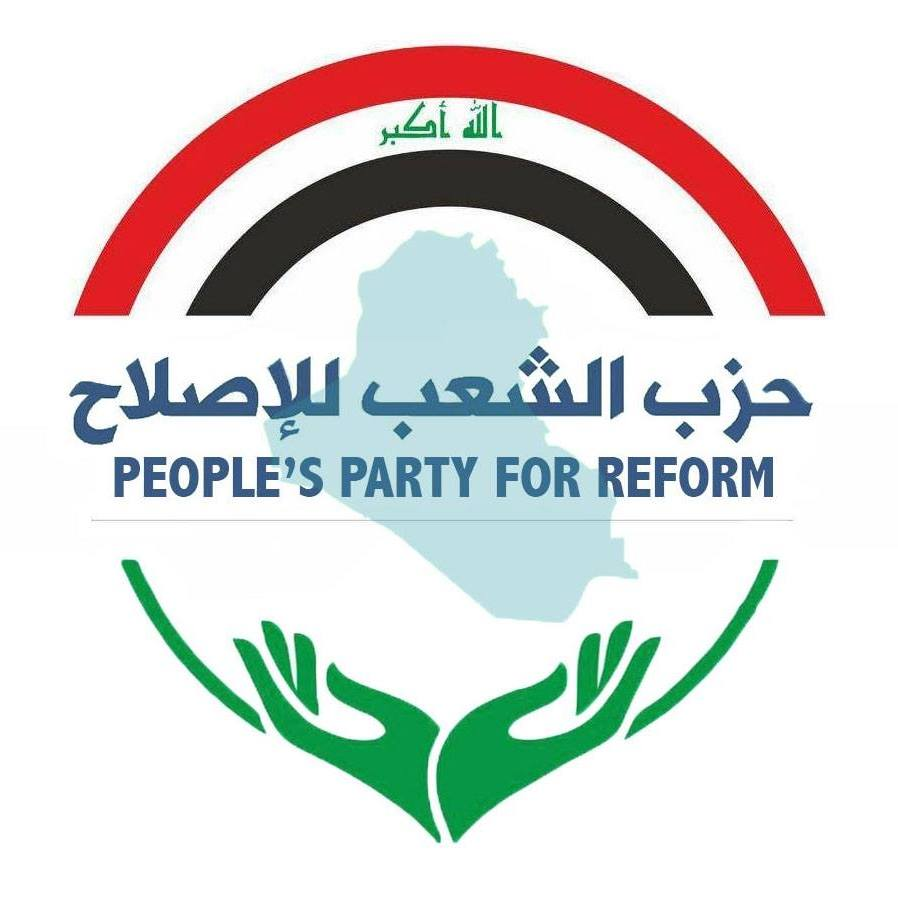
- Leader: Faiq Al Sheikh Ali
- Founded: 2011; 14 years ago
- Headquarters: Baghdad, Iraq; London, United Kingdom
- Ideology: Iraqi nationalism Nonsectarianism; Reformism; Secularism; Liberalism; Economic liberalism
- Political position: Centre; Social: Centre-left; Economic: Centre-right
- National affiliation: Civilized Alliance
- Colours: Blue
- Seats in the Council of Representatives of Iraq: 0 / 329

Website
- Official Facebook Page

The People's Party for Reform (Arabic: حزب الشعب للإصلاح, Ḥizb Al-Sha'ab Lil Islah) is an Iraqi Liberal Civil political party founded in 2011 under its previous name, the People's Party. It was later renamed to its current name in mid-2017.

The party's Secretary-General is Faiq Al Sheikh Ali, an Iraqi liberal secular politician who has been a member of the Council of Representatives of Iraq since 2014 serving in the Judiciary Committee.

== History ==
In mid-2011, Sheikh Ali founded the People's Party in London. The party is a Centrist Liberal one whose goals are rebuilding Iraq as a nation, establishing a state of justice and social guarantees, as well as establishing the principle of loyalty to Iraq and fighting underdevelopment & corruption.

Article 39(a) in the Iraqi constitution states that the freedom to form and join associations and political parties is guaranteed and shall be regulated by law. In 2015, Sheikh Ali helped pass the Political Parties Act which had not been legislated since the constitution was passed in 2005.

A day before the vote, Sheikh Ali wrote on his Facebook page: 'Today we ended the most complex law in the history of Iraq and most contrary and controversy between the political blocs and parties over many years. We (four members of parliament) left the Parliament after preparing the Act to a vote tomorrow. It may not satisfy all our ambitions and everything we aspired to, but it achieves many of them, which is the last we could reach through discussions.

The Act organises the provisions and procedures related to the establishment of political parties. It established a department for the political parties and organisations in the Electoral Commission in which a request had to be submitted listing not less than seven founding members of the party and a list of at least 2000 members from different Iraqi governorates, taking into account the representation of women.

In mid-2017, the party registered at the department for political parties and organisations and amended its name to the People's Party for Reform. It set out its new political program after expanding to include a number of provincial council and parliamentary members such as Basra MP Mohammed Al-Tai and Nineveh MP Ahmed Al-Jubouri who announced the party's founding conference in Baghdad, stating that the party will contribute to real change and reform.

== Party founding conference ==
On Monday, 20 November 2017, the founding conference of the party was held in Baghdad's Great Hall with the presence of 339 former members registered with the electoral commission who are entitled to vote, 311 new members and 307 guests, representing a total of 957 women and men. The 2-hour conference consisted of reading the political program and internal rules of the party, before nine members of the party were elected to represent the party's leadership.

The nine members then held a meeting on the podium in the presence of the Commission, wrote a memorandum signed to distribute the tasks and responsibilities and elect each member in accordance with the party's rules of procedure, and handed the record to the head of the Political Parties Department for approval by the Commission.

The party seeks to address all Iraqis regardless of their religion or ideological affiliation and has stated that it will participate strongly in the upcoming elections of May-2018.

== 2014 Parliamentary Elections ==
The party participated in the April 2014 Iraqi parliamentary election, as part of the Civil Democratic Alliance an Iraqi political coalition formed in 2013 by various civil parties. The party won one of the three seats of the coalition in Baghdad Governorate. It is represented by its Secretary-General, who arrived sixth in the Baghdad Governorate out of more than 3000 candidates, receiving 24,256 votes.

== 2018 Parliamentary Elections ==
After the Civil Democratic Alliance split in December-2017 into two alliances, the current consisting of mostly left-wing leaning parties who stayed as part of the alliance, a second alliance called the Civilized Alliance (Arabic: تحالف تمدّن) was formed in January-2018, consisting of four centrist liberal national parties. The new alliance is led by Faiq Al Sheikh Ali and includes his party, the National Civil Movement of MP Shirouk Al Abayachi, the Iraqi National Movement and the Al-Etifak National Party as well as a number of known independent figures. The alliance aims to establish a civil state based on justice and equal rights & duties for all citizens adopting liberal principles characterized by free & fair elections, separation of powers and the rule of law, ensuring equal protection of human rights, and civil & political freedoms for all.
