= Hadi al-Amiri =

Iraqi politician

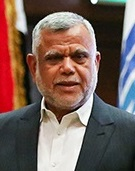
- al-Amiri in 2018

Member of the Council of Representatives
- Incumbent
- Assumed office 1 July 2014
- Constituency: Diyala Governorate

Minister of Transport
- In office 21 December 2010 – 8 September 2014
- Prime Minister: Nour al-Maliki
- Preceded by: Amer Abdoljalil
- Succeeded by: Baqir Jabr al-Zubeidi

President of the Badr Organization
- Incumbent
- Assumed office 16 July 2009
- Preceded by: Baqir Jabr al-Zubeidi

Personal details
- Born: 1 July 1954 (age 72) Diyala, Kingdom of Iraq
- Party: Badr Organization
- Other political affiliations: Fatah Alliance (2018–2025); State of Law Coalition (2014–2018)
- Education: University of Baghdad

Military service
- Allegiance: Iran
- Branch/service: Popular Mobilization Forces
- Years of service: 1982–present
- Rank: Commander
- Unit: Badr Brigade
- Battles/wars: Iran–Iraq War; 1991 uprisings in Iraq; Battle of Basra (1991); Battle of Karbala (1991); Kurdish Civil War; 2003 invasion of Iraq; War in Iraq (2013–2017); Siege of Amirli; Liberation of Jurf Al Sakhar; Salahuddin campaign; Battle of Tikrit; Battle of Baiji (2014–2015); Anbar campaign (2015–2016); Battle of Ramadi (2015–2016); Siege of Fallujah; Third Battle of Fallujah; 2017 Iraqi–Kurdish conflict

Hadi al-Amiri (Note: Arabic: هادي العامري, romanized: Hādī al-'Āmirī) (born 1 July 1954) is an Iraqi politician and militia leader who has headed the Badr Organization, a Shia political party and paramilitary organization, since 2009. He served as Minister of Transport from 2010 to 2014 and has represented Diyala Governorate in the Council of Representatives since 2014. Al-Amiri founded the Fatah Alliance in 2018, which became one of the main Shia political blocs in Iraq.

== Biography ==
As a young man, Hadi al-Ameri participated in the Iran–Iraq War on the Iranian side against his homeland Iraq. In Iran he participated in the founding of the Badr Brigade, an armed wing of the Supreme Council for the Islamic Revolution in Iraq, a pro-Iranian political party which fought the Republic of Iraq during the Iran–Iraq War of 1980–1988.

Amiri has denied claims that he has overseen flights passing through Iraqi airspace from Iran to Syria containing shipments of weapons to help the Syrian Government in the Syrian Civil War. However, he has proclaimed his affection for Qasem Soleimani, the late commander of Quds Force, a division of the Islamic Revolutionary Guard Corps, who was believed to have been playing an instrumental part in supporting former Syrian President Bashar al-Assad in the conflict.

He was the commander of Iraqi forces in the operation to liberate Jurf Al Sakhar during 2014 Iraqi conflict. As a commander in Popular Mobilization Forces, he has been active in the operations against ISIL. He has been described as "perhaps the most powerful and pro-Iranian" leader in the Popular Mobilization Forces and often met Brett H. McGurk, President Donald J. Trump's US Special Presidential Envoy for the Global Coalition to Counter ISIL. He is fluent in Persian.

In 2011, he accompanied the Iraqi Prime Minister Nouri al-Maliki on a visit to the White House during Barack Obama's presidency, in his capacity as Secretary of Transportation and also as a foe of (former Iraqi president) Saddam Hussein.

On 31 December 2019, along with Abu Mahdi al-Muhandis, Qais Khazali, and Falih Al-Fayyadh, US Secretary of State Mike Pompeo claimed him to be a leader of the attack on the United States embassy in Baghdad. In the aftermath of the 2020 Baghdad International Airport airstrike which resulted in the deaths of Qasem Soleimani and Muhandis, Amiri was seen as a candidate to replace Muhandis as a leader of the Popular Mobilization Forces, an Iraqi coalition of militias which fought against the Islamic State of Iraq and the Levant terrorist organisation.

Following the assassination of Ali Khamenei during the 2026 Iran war, Badr Organization leader Hadi al-Amiri pledged allegiance to the new supreme leader of Iran, Mojtaba Khamenei.

== 2021 Iraqi elections ==
Amiri dismissed the 2021 Iraqi parliamentary election as "fabricated".
