= Ministry of Transport (Iraq) =

Ministry of Transport of Iraq
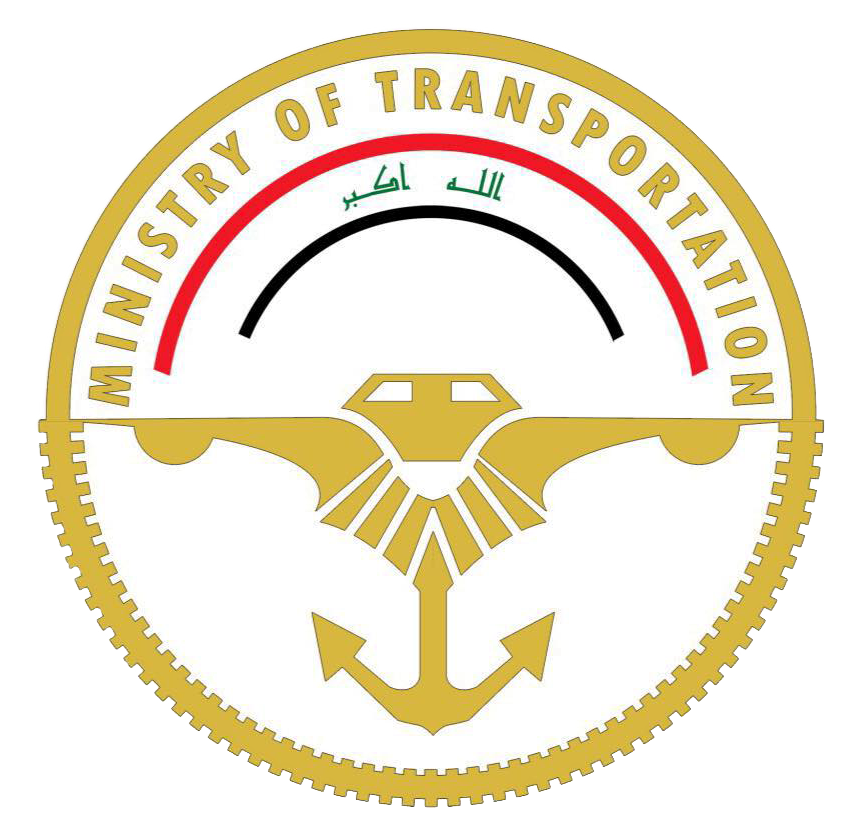
- Incumbent; Wahab al-Hasani since 14 May 2026
- Appointer: Government of Iraq
- Formation: 2 November 1940
- Website: Official Website

The Ministry of Transport (Arabic: وزارة النقل العراقية) is a central government ministry of Iraq tasked with managing the affairs of transport. It is currently headed by Wahab al-Hasani.
