= Ammar al-Hakim =

Iraqi politician (born 1971)

Sayyid Ammar al-Hakim
- سيد عمار الحكيم
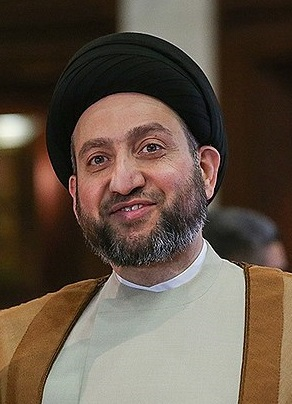
- al-Hakim in 2018

Leader of the National Wisdom Movement
- Incumbent
- Assumed office 24 July 2017
- Preceded by: Party established

President of the Islamic Supreme Council of Iraq
- In office 1 September 2009 – 1 August 2017
- Preceded by: Abdul Aziz al-Hakim
- Succeeded by: Humam Hamoudi

Personal details
- Born: 1971 (age 54–55) Najaf, Ba'athist Iraq
- Party: National Wisdom Movement (since 2017); Islamic Supreme Council of Iraq (until 2017)
- Other political affiliations: Al-Muwatin (2014–2017); National Iraqi Alliance (2005–2014)
- Relations: Hakim family
- Education: University of Qom
- Profession: Cleric

Sayyid Ammar Abdul Aziz Muhsin al-Hakim (Arabic: عمار عبد العزيز محسن الحكيم; b. 1971) is an Iraqi cleric and politician who led the Islamic Supreme Council of Iraq (ISCI), from 2009 to 2017. He is currently the head of the National Wisdom Movement which is a political coalition in Iraq that was formed to contest the 2018 general election.

== Early life ==
Al-Hakim was born in 1971 in Najaf, to cleric, Abdul Aziz Al-Hakim, who preceded him as leader of ISCI, and the grandson of grand Ayatollah Muhsin al-Hakim.

== Exile ==
He went into exile in Iran in 1979 with his father after the government of Saddam Hussein had executed seven of his uncles and sixty two of his relatives. He attended private schools in Tehran and graduated from the Islamic Arabic University in Qom. He taught Arabic language, Islamic jurisprudence, logic, philosophy and the science of the Qur'an at the same university for several years.

== Career ==
He supervises the establishment and management of many organizations, scientific and cultural institutions in the exile, including the House of Wisdom for Islamic Science. In 2003 he established the Al-Hakim Foundation under the supervision of his uncle Ayatollah Sayyid Muhammad Baqir Al-Hakim. The Al-Hakim Foundation later received consultative status with the Economic and Social Council of the United Nations. Headquartered in Najaf, it is now the largest institution of civil society in Iraq, with over 80 offices in all Governorates of Iraq, and working in the field of humanitarian assistance, development, human rights, and dialogue among religions. The Foundation also oversees several schools, colleges and cultural and scientific centers. The foundation holds numerous symposiums, conferences and social and cultural events, in addition to publishing a number of magazines and specialized publications.

== Detainment ==
On February 23, 2007, he was detained by U.S. forces at a border when he was returning from Iran for 12 hours and he was released. The U.S. ambassador Zalmay Khalilzad apologized for the arrest and stressed that Washington did not mean any disrespect to al-Hakim or his family.

== Islamic Supreme Council of Iraq ==
He succeeded to the leadership of the Islamic Supreme Council of Iraq (ISCI), a leading Shiite Arab party, on the death of his father, Abdul Aziz al-Hakim, in 2009. He led the ISCI-led coalition, Citizen Alliance, in the 2014 general elections, gaining 29 seats and becoming the third largest coalition. They joined the government of Haider al-Abadi, with senior ISCI member Adil Abdul-Mahdi becoming oil minister.

In August 2017, in advance of the upcoming 2018 general elections, he announced his resignation from ISCI and the creation of a new coalition called the National Wisdom Movement (Al-Hikma). All except 5 of the existing MPs from the Citizens Alliance joined Al-Hikma.

== See also ==
- Hakim family

Party political offices
Preceded by Abdul Aziz al-Hakim	Leader of Islamic Supreme Council of Iraq; 2009–2017	Succeeded by Humam Hamoudi
