= Al-Wataniya =

National Coalition ائتلاف الوطنية Al-Wataniya
- Leader: Ayad Allawi
- Founded: December 2012
- Split from: Iraqi National Movement
- Ideology: Secularism; Centrism
- Political position: Centre
- National affiliation: Reconstruction and Development Coalition (2025-present)
- Seats in the Council of Representatives: 1 / 329
- Seats in the Governorate Councils: 0 / 440

Website
- al-watnia.com

The National Coalition (Arabic: Al-Wataniya, Arabic: ائتلاف الوطنية) is a political coalition in Iraq.

== Members ==
The following parties made up the coalition for the 2014 parliamentary election:

- Iraqi National Accord – led by Ayad Allawi
- Builders of Iraq – led by Abd Thiyab Jaza
- Peace and Development Movement/Firmness – led by Abd al-Karim Ali Yassin Khalaf
- Call of Freedom Gathering – led by Shalan Abd al-Jabar Ali al-Krayem
- Iraqi Unity Gathering – led by Baha Nassir Hussein Salman
- Iraqi National Council of Commons – led by Hassan Khudhaller Abbas Shwend
- Loyalty to the Country Gathering – led by Wissam Sami Abd Allah Sulalman al-Bayat
- Dialogue and Change Movement – led by Hamid Ubaid Mutlaq Omar
- Movement of the Iraqi Falcons – led by Dhamr Hamid Ahmed Mahmoud
- The Liberation and Building Front – led by Dhamin Iiwi Mutlaq Khalaf
- Yazidi Progress Party – led by Waad Hamid Mattu Sabo
- The Crescent – led by Wathab Shakir Mahmoud Aboud
- Iraqi Republican Gathering – led by Hashim Jafar Yihya Hashim al-Habbobi
- The National Decision List – led by Sabah Abd al-Rasoul Abd al-Ridha Rashid al-Tammimi
- Iraqi Justice and Reform Movement – led by Abdullah Hamid Ujayel al-Yawer

== Electoral results ==
=== Iraqi Parliament ===
Council of Representatives
Election year	# of overall votes	% of overall vote	# of overall seats won	+/–	Leader
2014	686,017 (#5)	5.27	21 / 328	–	Ayad Allawi
2018	623,594 (#6)	6.01	21 / 329	–	Ayad Allawi

=== Governorate Councils ===
Governorate Councils
Election year	# of overall votes	% of overall vote	# of overall seats won	+/–	Leader
2013	298,198 (#7)	4.13	16 / 601	–	Ayad Allawi
