= Civilized Alliance (Iraq) =

Political coalition in Iraq

Civilized Alliance تحالف تمدّن
- Leader: Faiq Al Sheikh Ali
- Founded: 2018
- Headquarters: Baghdad
- Ideology: Iraqi nationalism Secularism; Reformism; Nonsectarianism; Liberalism; Economic liberalism
- Political position: Centre
- Colours: Blue
- Seats in the Council of Representatives of Iraq: 0 / 328

Website
- Official Facebook Page

The Civilized Alliance (Tamadon) (Arabic: تحالف تمدّن, Tahalof Tamadon) was an Iraqi political alliance formed by a number of civil, liberal and national parties. The alliance, announced in January 2018 consists of four main parties, the People's Party for Reform, the Al-Etifak National Party, the National Civil Movement and Iraq's National Movement. The alliance includes a number of independent liberal figures.

It is headed by the Secretary-General of the People's Party for Reform Faiq Al Sheikh Ali. The alliance has stated that it will participate strongly in the upcoming Iraqi parliamentary elections staged to take place on 12 May 2018 aiming for change and reform in Iraqi politics.

The Civilized Alliance aims to establish a civil state based on justice and equal rights and duties for all citizens adopting liberal principles characterized by free and fair elections, separation of powers and the rule of law, ensuring equal protection of human rights, and civil & political freedoms for all. It had 4 MPs prior to the election, Ahmed Al-Jubouri from Nineveh province, Mohammad Al-Tai from Basra, and both Faiq Al Sheikh Ali and Shirouk Al Abayachi from Baghdad.

On 20 February 2018, the Independent High Electoral Commission (Arabic: المفوضية العليا المستقلة للانتخابات) conducted a draw to distribute the electoral list numbers. The Civilized Alliance was given the number 136.

The alliance won 2 seats in the 2018 Iraqi parliamentary election.
