= Ila al-Amam (Iraq) =

Ila al-Amam (Arabic: إلى الأمام, 'Forward') was a communist group in Iraq, known by the publication it issued under that name. The group publishing Ila al-Amam had been expelled from the Iraqi Communist Party in August 1942, after which they founded Ila al-Amam. The main leaders of the group were Thunun Ayub ('Qadir') and Yaqub Cohen ('Fadil'). Inside the Communist Party, Ayub had been a Central Committee member but had developed personal differences with the Communist Party general secretary Fahd.

The Ila al-Amam suffered heavily from state repression. In September 1944 the Ila al-Amam group merged with the Shararah group, forming the Wahdat an-Nidal.
