= National Wisdom Movement =

National Wisdom Movement تيار الحكمة الوطني
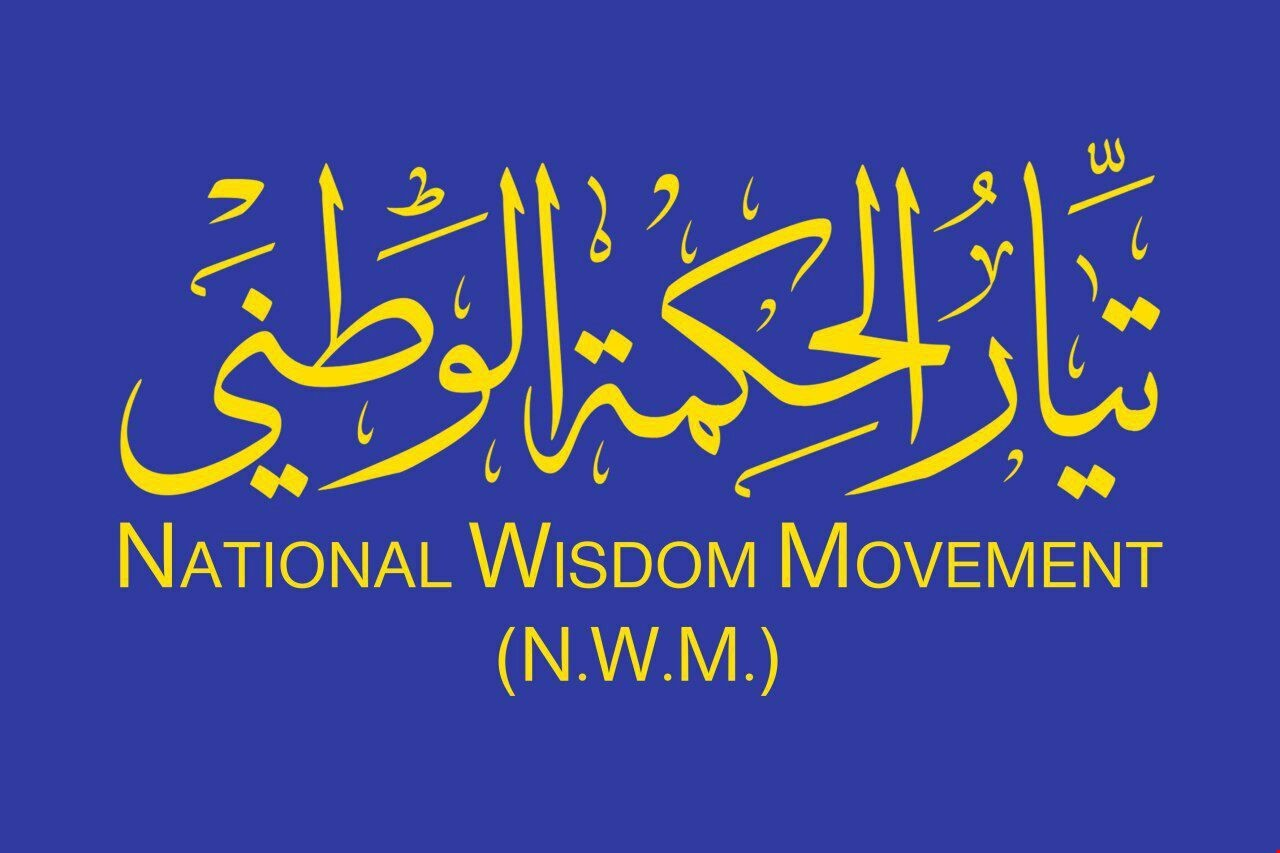
- Leader: Ammar al-Hakim
- Founded: 24 July 2017; 8 years ago
- Dissolved: 15 January 2021
- Merger of: Al-Muwatin
- Merged into: Alliance of Nation State Forces
- Ideology: Catch-all; Islamism; Nonsectarianism
- Political position: Big tent
- Religion: Shia Islam

The National Wisdom Movement (Arabic: تيار الحكمة الوطني, romanized: Tayar al-Hikmah al-Watani) is a political coalition in Iraq that was formed to contest the 2018 general election. It is led by Ammar al-Hakim, who was previously the leader of the Islamic Supreme Council of Iraq (ISCI).

== Background ==
ISCI is one of the oldest Shiite Islamist political parties in Iraq, founded in exile during the presidency of Saddam Hussein by a senior cleric, Ayatollah Mohammad Baqir al-Hakim. Following the US-led invasion of Iraq in 2003, it has been a leading party of the majority Shiite Arab population and an important component of every government. The leader of ISCI, Abdul Aziz al-Hakim, was a member of the Iraqi Governing Council in 2003–04 and president in December 2003; a leading member, Adil Abdul-Mahdi served as Prime Minister from 2018 to 2020 and was Finance Minister from 2004 to 2005 in the Iraqi Interim Government, Vice-president 2005–2011 – which included the Iraqi Transitional Government and the Al Maliki I Government – and Oil Minister (one of the "sovereign ministries") since 2014 as part of the Al Abadi Government. Another member, Baqir Jabr al-Zubeidi, was Minister of Interior in 2005–2006 and Finance Minister 2006–2010. Hadi Al-Amiri, who led the military wing of ISCI, was Transport Minister 2010–14 as part of the Al Maliki II Government.

ISCI was led by Mohammad Baqir al-Hakim from 1992 until his assassination in 2003; he was succeeded by his brother, Abdul Aziz al-Hakim, who led until his death in 2009 when he was succeeded by his son, Ammar.

They were the largest component in the Al-Muwatin (Citizens Alliance) list which contested the 2014 elections, coming third with 29 seats.

== Foundation ==
Ammar al-Hakim announced in July 2017 that he was leaving ISCI and forming a new "non-Islamic national movement" called the National Wisdom Movement (al-Hikmah). All except 5 of the existing 29 MPs from the Citizens Alliance joined Al-Hikma. He said he would "get rid of sectarian and nationalist polarization, open up to the Sunnis in Iraq, reach an understanding with neighbouring countries and disassociate Iraq from the conflict in the region".

Other senior members of ISCI had accused Ammar of making decisions without consulting other leaders and rejected his proposal to introduce more young people to the leadership; when he informed the Supreme Leader of Iran, Ayatollah Khamenei, of his move he responded that "your withdrawal from the Council serves no interest and is a wrong step."

The new party also retained from ISCI the main assets of the party, including Al-Forat TV station and the grand palace complex in Baghdad.
