= Alliance Towards Reforms =

Iraqi electoral coalition that includes Sadrist and secular parties

Alliance Towards Reforms تحالف سائرون للإصلاح
- Leader: Hassan al-Aquli (Political leader); Muqtada al-Sadr (Spiritual leader)
- Founded: 25 January 2018
- Dissolved: 24 July 2021
- Ideology: Iraqi nationalism Anti-corruption; Factions: Social democracy Syncretic politics Shi'a political thought Communism
- Political position: Big tent
- Colors: Dark cyan Turquoise

The Alliance Towards Reforms or Marching Towards Reform (Arabic: تحالف سائرون للإصلاح), also known by its Arabic short form Saairun (Arabic: سائرون, Saairun, lit. 'Forward'), was an Iraqi electoral coalition formed to gain political control in the 2018 general election. The main components were the Shi’a Islamist Sadrist Integrity Party, the leftist Iraqi Communist Party, the Youth Movement for Change Party, the Party of Progress and Reform and the Iraqi Republican Group and the State of Justice Party. The alliance won 54 seats, more than any other coalition in the election.

In the previous election, the Sadrists (a Shia movement emerging in the 1990s to oppose President Saddam Hussein) had run as the Al-Ahrar Bloc and won 34 seats. They initially supported the al Abadi government, with Baha al-Araji serving as one of the Deputy Prime Ministers. However, they later withdrew this stance, organizing protests against government corruption and sectarianism. On 30 April 2016, supporters of the Alliance Towards Reforms occupied the Council of Representatives in protest.

The coalition effectively ended when the Iraqi Communist Party decided to boycott the 2021 general election.

== Opposition ==
During a visit to Iraq three months before the election, senior Iranian politician Ali Akbar Velayati declared: "We will not allow liberals and communists to govern Iraq," in reference to the Alliance. This comment was criticized by Iraqi secular MPs as interference in the internal affairs of Iraq.

== 2018 elections ==
The 2018 elections saw significant gains for the Alliance Towards Reforms. They won 17 seats in Baghdad, 6 seats in Dhi Qar, 5 in Maysan and Basra, 4 in Najaf and Babil, 3 in Karbala, Qadissiya and Wasit, and 2 seats in Muthanna and Diyala. A communist woman representing the Alliance, Suhad al-Khateeb, was elected in the 2018 elections to represent the city of Najaf which was deemed to be one of the most religious and conservative cities in Iraq. Khateeb, who is a teacher and an anti-poverty and women's rights activist, said upon her victory: "We, the Communist party, have a long history of honesty - we were not agents for foreign occupations. We want social justice, citizenship, and are against sectarianism. This is also what Iraqis want."

== Election results ==
Election year	Votes	%	Seats	+/–	Government
2018	1,500,862	(#1)	54 / 329	▲54	Coalition Partner
