= 2021–2022 Iraqi political crisis =

Political crisis in Iraq

- Part of the Iraq Conflict
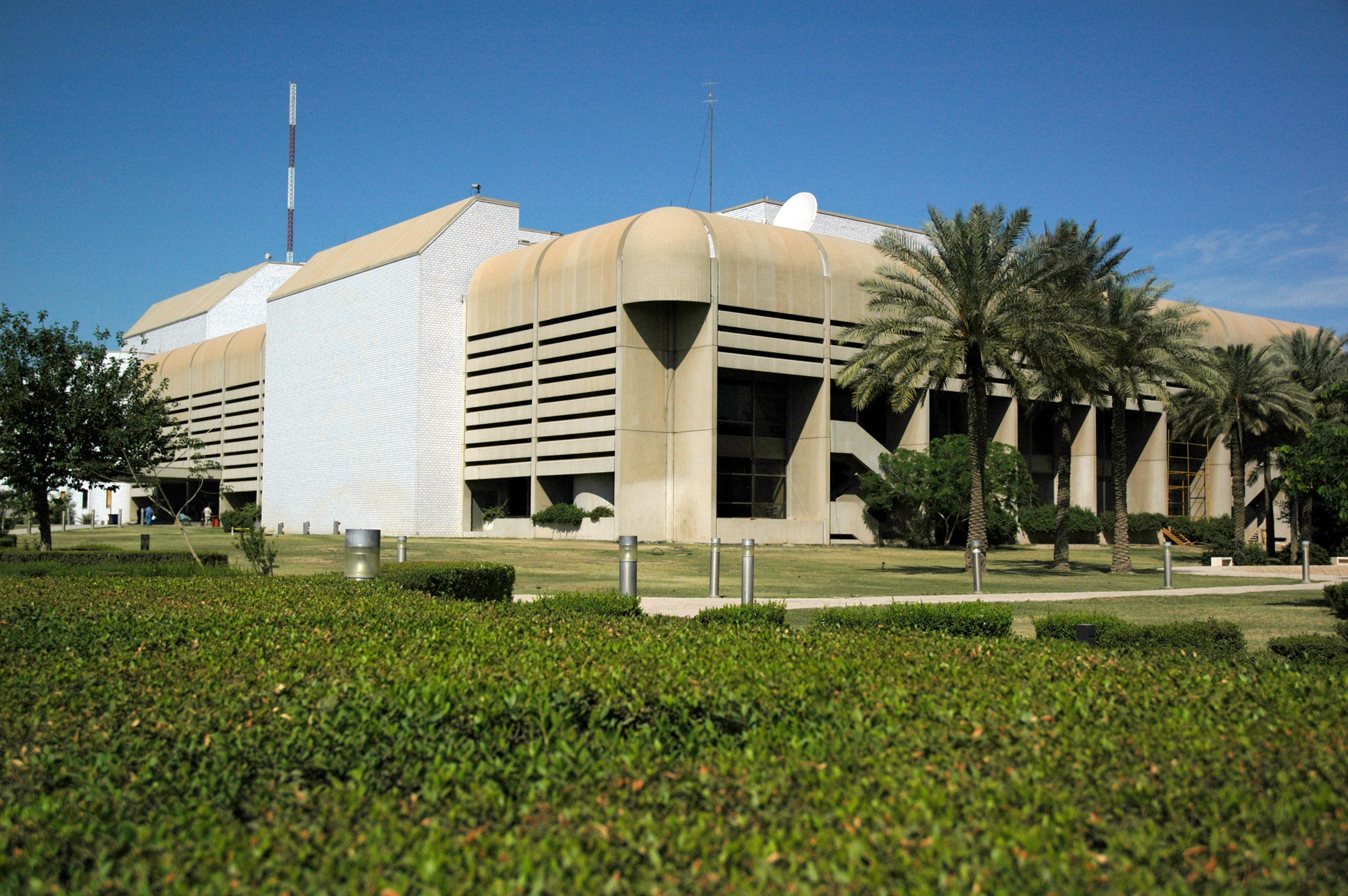
- The Baghdad Convention Center, home of the Iraqi Parliament
- Date: 5 November 2021 – 27 October 2022
- Location: Iraq
- Caused by: Inability to form a coalition government or elect a president following the 2021 parliamentary election; Attempted assassination of Mustafa Al-Kadhimi
- Result: New president elected 13 October 2022; new government approved 27 October 2022.

Lead figures
Mustafa Al-Kadhimi	Muqtada al-Sadr	Nouri al-Maliki

Casualties
- Deaths: 53 killed
- Injuries: 1,080 injured

Between the parliamentary election in October 2021 and October 2022, there was a political crisis in Iraq, with members of the Council of Representatives of Iraq being unable to form a stable coalition government, or elect a new President. Basic government services such as the civil service and military continued functioning, but the national political system was in deadlock including in respect of almost all major spending and taxation issues. On 27 October 2022, the government of Prime Minister Mohammed Shia' Al Sudani was approved by the Council of Representatives.

== Events ==
=== 2021 ===
Violent clashes in Baghdad following the election and the attempted assassination of Prime Minister Mustafa Al-Kadhimi began the crisis. On 18 November Muqtada al-Sadr said he would like to form a majority government.

=== 2022 ===
On 9 January, the newly elected parliament met for the first time in the Green Zone to elect the parliament speaker and two deputies. This first parliamentary session resulted in senior interim parliament speaker Mahmoud al-Mashahadani falling ill and being taken to hospital. Sunni lawmaker and current parliament speaker Mohamed al-Halbousi was re-elected for a second term, with deputies Shakhawan Abdulla from the Kurdistan Democratic Party and Hakim al-Zamili from the Sadrist Movement. Thus, the Kurdistan Democratic Party, Sadrist Movement and Progress Party succeeded in filling those three positions due to the candidates of each bloc voting for each other. These nominations were not recognized as legitimate by the Shiite Pro-Iran factions in parliament, known as the Coordination Framework bloc, who claimed the session could not continue without the presence of the ill al-Mashahadani. Parliament was then temporarily suspended but later was able to resume again after a review by the Iraqi Supreme Court.

According to the Constitution of Iraq a president must be selected within 30 days after the election of the parliament speaker. Incumbent Barham Salih was put forward by the Patriotic Union of Kurdistan to run for a second term, while the Kurdistan Democratic Party selected former foreign minister Hoshyar Zebari to run for the post as the party's second putting forward of a president to the required parliamentary vote.

Sadr amassed majority in parliament that included Kurdish KDP and Sunni Progress Party and Azem Alliance. The majority excluded pro-Iran Coordination Framework. After that, Supreme Court of Iraq ruled that parliament requires 2/3 quorum to elect the President, allowing Coordination Framework to block the process. In protest, on 13 June 2022, 73 MPs from Sadr’s bloc resigned from parliament. On 23 June, the Council of Representatives swore in 73 new members in their place. As a result, the Coordination Framework bloc, an alliance of Iran-backed parties led by Nouri al-Maliki, grew to 130 seats.

On 17 July, secret recordings were leaked of Nouri al-Maliki, the former Prime Minister, in which he was criticising al-Sadr. This was reported to have been controversial and a factor in deepening the crisis.

On 25 July, the framework nominated former minister and governor of Maysan Governorate Mohammed Shia' Al Sudani as prime minister.

On 27 July, angry about the influence of Iran in Iraqi domestic governance, followers of al-Sadr breached the Green Zone and the Iraqi Parliament in Baghdad. After a public message by al-Sadr to "pray and go home", the crowd dispersed. Thousands of supporters of Muqtada al-Sadr had been camping in the parliament building since July 27. On 30 July followers of al-Sadr stormed the Iraqi parliament again.

On 3 August, Muqtada al-Sadr called for snap elections.

On 29 August, Sadr announced via a tweet his retirement from political life. Later that day, his supporters stormed the presidential palace and armed clashes inside the Green Zone ensued, resulting in the deaths of at least 15 protesters. The Iraqi Army announced a nationwide curfew. Protests and clashes also erupted in Basra and Maysan Governorate in southern Iraq.

On 30 August, fighting spread to Karbala and escalated in Basra as demonstrators stormed the Iraqi parliamentary office in Karbala and blocked the entrance to Umm Qasr port.

On approximately 5 September the second round of negotiations ended, leaving further talks required to agree on any selection for the key ratificatory and head of state role of president and to agree a working coalition, key-issues confidence and supply arrangement between the parties or to the fresh elections the Prime Minister continues to seek.

After more talks between the political parties, on 13 October, the Iraqi Parliament gathered once again and elected Abdul Latif Rashid as the country's new president. He won after winning 230 votes in the parliament beating incumbent Barham Salih. This election marked the beginning of the end of the deadlock as Rashid then tasked Mohammed Shia' Al Sudani with forming the government to become prime minister. Although offered by various figures, Sadr said he would not partake in this new government led by al-Sudani.

On 27 October 2022, the government of Mohammed Shia' Al Sudani, from the Coordination Framework, was approved by the Council of Representatives. In his acceptance speech ahead of the final vote, Al Sudani stated that "corruption" had caused "many economic problems, (...) increasing poverty, unemployment, and poor public services".

== See also ==
- 2021 Baghdad clashes
- Assassination attempt of Mustafa Al-Kadhimi
- 2022 Iraq parliament attack
- 2022 Baghdad clashes
