= History of Iraq (2011–present) =

May 2025 military situation in Iraq and Syria: Controlled by Iraqi government Controlled by Islamic State Controlled by Iraqi Kurds Controlled by Syrian government Controlled by Syrian Kurds

The departure of US troops from Iraq in 2011 ended the period of occupation that had begun with the U.S.-led invasion in March 2003. The time since U.S. withdrawal has been marked by a renewed Iraqi insurgency and by a spillover of the Syrian civil war into Iraq. By 2013, the insurgency escalated into a renewed war, the central government of Iraq being opposed by ISIL and various factions, primarily radical Sunni forces during the early phase of the conflict. The war ended in 2017 with an Iraqi government and allied victory, however ISIL continues a low-intensity insurgency in remote parts of the country.

ISIL forces seized the majority of Al Anbar Governorate, including the cities of Fallujah, Al Qaim, Abu Ghraib and (in May 2015) Ramadi, leaving them in control of 90% of Anbar. Tikrit, Mosul and most of the Nineveh Governorate, along with parts of Salahuddin, Kirkuk and Diyala Governorates, were seized by insurgent forces in the June 2014 offensive. ISIL captured Sinjar and a number of other towns in the August 2014 offensive, but Sinjar became a contested city in December 2014.

== Insurgency (2011–2013) ==
In February 2011, the Arab Spring protests spread to Iraq; but the initial protests did not topple the government. The Iraqi National Movement boycotted Parliament for several weeks in late 2011 and early 2012, claiming that the Shiite-dominated government was striving to sideline Sunnis.

In 2012 and 2013, levels of violence increased and armed groups inside Iraq were increasingly galvanised by the Syrian Civil War. Both Sunnis and Shias crossed the border to fight in Syria. In December 2012, Sunni Arabs protested against the government, who they claimed marginalised them. During 2013, Sunni militant groups stepped up attacks targeting the Iraq's population in an attempt to undermine confidence in the Nouri al-Maliki-led government. In 2014, Sunni insurgents belonging to the Islamic State terrorist group seized control of large swathes of land including several major Iraqi cities, like Tikrit, Fallujah and Mosul creating hundreds of thousands of internally displaced persons amid reports of atrocities by ISIL fighters. On 4 June 2014, the insurgents began their efforts to capture Mosul. The Iraqi army officially had 30,000 soldiers and another 30,000 federal police stationed in the city, facing a 1,500-member attacking force. The Iraqi forces' actual numbers were much lower due to "ghost soldiers", severely reducing combat ability. After six days of combat and massive desertions, Iraqi soldiers received orders to retreat. The city of Mosul fell under ISIL's control. An estimated 500,000 civilians fled from the city.

== War (2013–2017) ==
By mid-2014 the country was in chaos with a new government yet to be formed following national elections, and the insurgency reaching new heights. In early June 2014 the Islamic State in Iraq and the Levant (ISIS) took over the cities of Mosul and Tikrit and said it was ready to march on Baghdad, while Iraqi Kurdish forces took control of key military installations in the major oil city of Kirkuk. Prime Minister Nouri al-Maliki asked his parliament to declare a state of emergency that would give him increased powers, but the lawmakers refused.

In summer 2014 U.S. President Obama announced a renewed military intervention in the form of aerial support, with the aim of halting the advance of ISIS forces and rendering humanitarian aid to stranded refugees and stabilize the political situation.

Since June 2014, al-Maliki had faced growing pressure to resign, including from the United States. In July 2014, the Kurdistan Region demanded his resignation, and his own party (the Islamic Dawa Party) began looking for a new leader.

On 14 August 2014, Prime Minister Nouri al-Maliki succumbed to the pressure at home and abroad to step down. Iraq's new president, Fuad Masum, appointed a new prime minister, Haider al-Abadi on 19 August 2014. However, for the appointment to take effect, al-Abadi needed to form a government and be confirmed by Parliament, within 30 days. After initially expressing opposition to al-Abadi's selection, al-Maliki endorsed al-Abadi and said he would not stand in the way.

In what was claimed to be revenge for the aerial bombing ordered by President Obama, ISIL, which by this time had changed their name to the Islamic State, beheaded an American journalist, James Foley, who had been kidnapped two years previously. Despite U.S. bombings and breakthroughs on the political front, Iraq remained in chaos with the Islamic State consolidating its gains, and sectarian violence continuing unabated. On 22 August 2014, suspected Shia militants opened fire on a Sunni mosque during Friday prayers, killing 70 worshipers. Separately, Iraqi forces in helicopters killed 30 Sunni fighters in the town of Dhuluiya. A day later, apparently in retaliation for the attack on the mosque, three bombings across Iraq killed 35 people.

Kurdistan Region has participated in fighting ISIL, while also taking other territory (such as Kirkuk). Since August 2014, the U.S. has also been bombing ISIL positions. In late January 2015, Iraqi forces recaptured the entire province of Diyala from the Islamic State. On 2 March, Second Battle of Tikrit began. and after more than a month of hard fighting, Iranians, Iraqis and Shiite militia overcame ISIL fighters and took Tikrit. This success was off-set in late May, by ISIL's capture of the provincial capital of Ramadi in Anbar Governorate.

Iraqi Prime Minister Haider al-Abadi officially announced the liberation of the city of Mosul from the control of the Islamic State of Iraq and the Levant on 10 July 2017.

== Parliamentary elections (2018) ==
Parliamentary elections were held on 12 May 2018. Kurdish politician, Barham Salih was elected as president by parliament in October 2018. Former Finance Minister Adil Abdul-Mahdi was selected to form a new government. The new government was approved by the Council of Representatives on 24 October 2018.

== Protests (2018–2019) ==
Protests over deteriorating economic conditions and state corruption started in July 2018 in Baghdad and other major Iraqi cities, mainly in the central and southern provinces. The latest nationwide protests, erupting in October 2019, had a death toll of at least 93 people, including police.

== 2018–present ==
In March 2018, Turkey launched military operations to eliminate active Kurdish separatist fighters in the far north of the country. Muqtada al-Sadr's political coalition won parliamentary election in May 2018. Serious civil unrest rocked the country beginning in Baghdad and Najaf in July 2018 and spreading to other provinces in September as rallies to protest corruption, unemployment, and public service failures turned violent. Protests started again on 1 October 2019, against corruption, unemployment and inefficient public services, before they escalated into calls to overthrow the administration and to stop Iranian intervention. The government at times reacted harshly, resulting in over 500 deaths by 12 December 2019. On 27 December 2019, the K-1 Air Base was attacked by more than 30 rockets, killing a U.S. civilian contractor and injuring others. The U.S. blamed the Iranian-backed Kata'ib Hezbollah militia. Later that month, the U.S. bombed five Kata'ib Hezbollah militia's positions in Iraq and Syria. On 31 December, dozens of Iraqi Shia militiamen and their supporters marched into the Green Zone of Baghdad and surrounded the U.S. embassy.

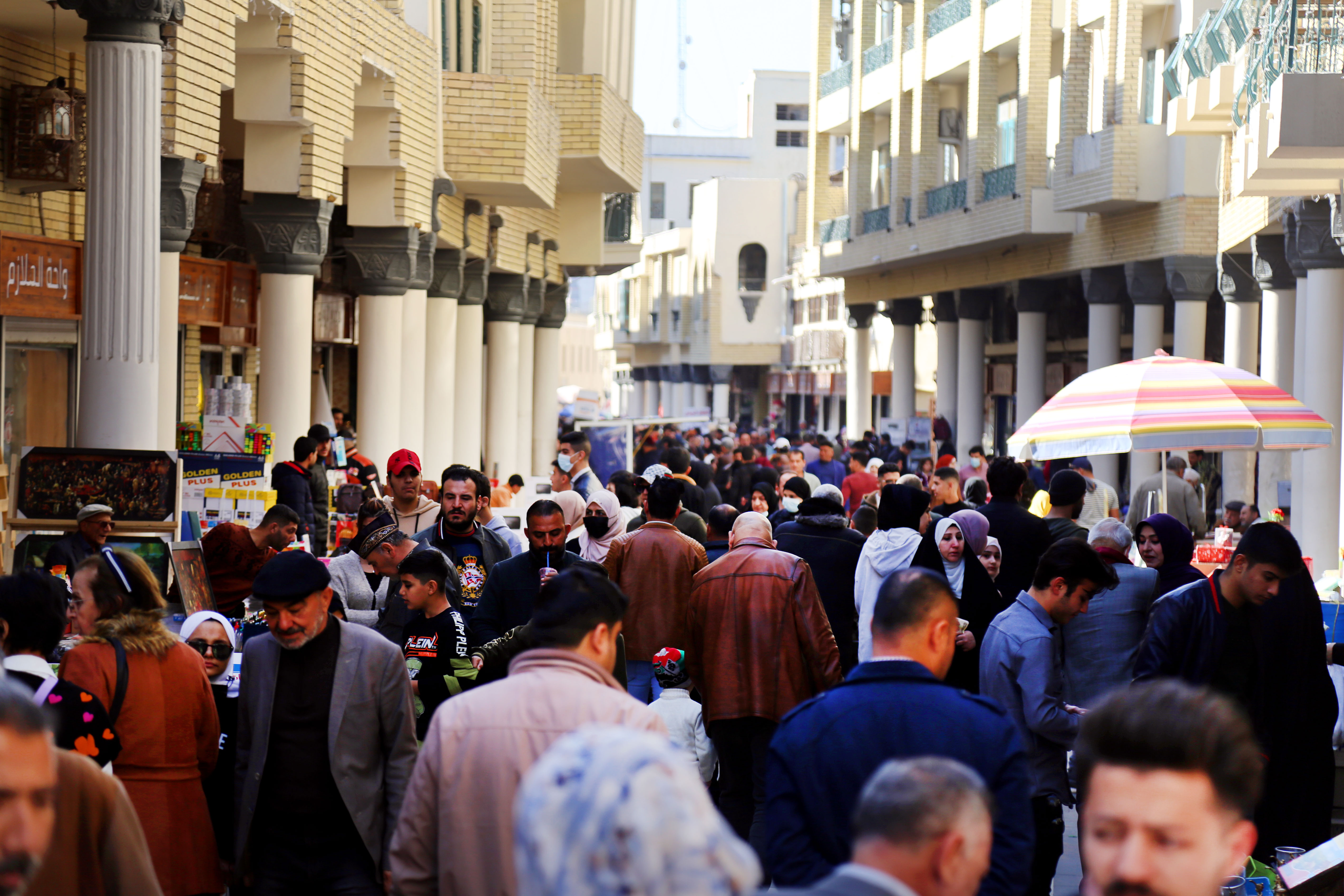
Baghdad street in 2022

Three days later, amid rising tensions between the United States and Iran, the U.S. launched a drone strike on a convoy traveling near Baghdad Airport, killing Qasem Soleimani, Iranian major-general and Islamic Revolutionary Guard Corps (IRGC) and Quds Force commander, the second most powerful person of Iran; Abu Mahdi al-Muhandis, deputy commander of Iraq's Popular Mobilization Forces (PMF or PMU); four senior Iranian officers; and four Iraqi officers. Following months of protests that broke out across Iraq in October 2019 and the resignation of Prime Minister Adel Abdul Mahdi and his cabinet, Mustafa al-Kadhimi became a leading contender for the Premiership. On 9 April 2020, he was named by President Barham Salih as prime minister-designate. On 30 November 2021, the political bloc led by Shia leader Muqtada al-Sadr was confirmed the winner of the October election. A period of political crisis and near-deadlock of eleven months followed.

In June 2022, all 73 members of Parliament from the Sadrist Movement resigned, which is considered to be a move of Muqtada al-Sadr to deligitimise the remaining, rivalling, Shia parties still in the Parliament and demonstrate his rejection of the muhasasa (quota-based) system established in 2003 by the US occupation. On 27 July 2022, the parliament building was stormed by protesters for the second time in a week. In October 2022, Abdul Latif Rashid was elected as the new President of Iraq after winning the parliamentary election against incumbent Barham Salih, who was running for a second term. The presidency is largely ceremonial and is traditionally held by a Kurd. And on 27 October 2022, Mohammed Shia al-Sudani, close ally of former Prime Minister Nouri al-Maliki, took the office to succeed Mustafa al-Kadhimi as new Prime Minister of Iraq.

In July 2023, vast swathes of southern and western Iraq were left without electricity after a fire broke out causing an explosion at a power station south of Basra. The country's electrical grid faces systemic pressures due to climate change, fuel shortages, and an increase in demand. Corruption remains endemic throughout all levels of Iraqi governance while the US-endorsed sectarian political system has driven increased levels of violent terrorism and sectarian conflicts within the country. Climate change is driving wide-scale droughts across the country while water reserves are rapidly depleting. The country has been in a prolonged drought since 2020 and experienced its second-driest season in the past four decades in 2021. Water flows in the Tigris and Euphrates are down between 30 and 40 percent. Half of the country's farmland is at risk of desertification. Nearly 40 percent of Iraq "has been overtaken by blowing desert sands that claim tens of thousands of acres of arable land every year." It is believed the Iraq war has changed the country forever.

== See also ==
- Iraqi insurgency (2011–2013)
- Iraqi conflict (2003–present)
- Northern Iraq offensive (June 2014)
- Northern Iraq offensive (August 2014)
- Arab Winter
- 2018 Iraqi parliamentary election
- 2021–2022 Iraqi political crisis
- History of Iraq
