= Muzahim Al-Khayat =

Muzahim Al-Khayyat
- مزاحم الخياط
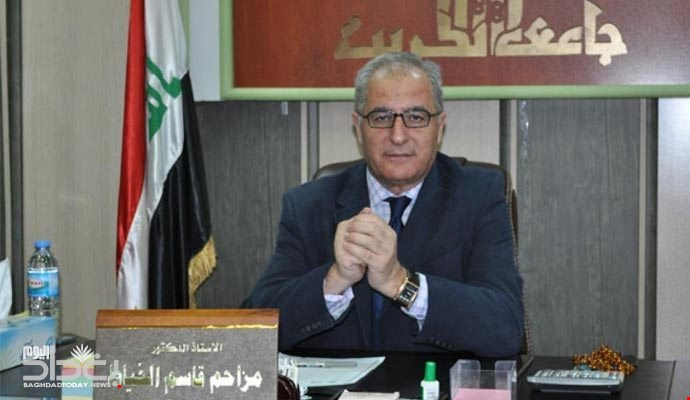
- Al-Khayyat in 2012

Personal details
- Born: 11 June 1953 (age 73) Mosul, Nineveh, Iraq
- Party: Takadum Party
- Education: University of Mosul Royal College of Surgeons in Ireland Royal College of Surgeons of England
- Occupation: Surgeon, academic, politician
- Profession: Doctor
- Website: https://www.facebook.com/muzahimalkhayat

Muzahim Qasim Al-Khayyat (Arabic: مزاحم قاسم الخياط; born June 11, 1953) is an Iraqi surgeon, academic, and politician.

== Early life and education ==
Muzahim Qasim Al-Khayyat was born on June 11, 1953 (29 Ramadan 1372) in the city of Mosul, Iraq, to a prominent Mosul family in the Kingdom of Iraq. His father was a tailor, and the neighborhood where his father's shop was located was named after him. He is the seventh son in a family of ten, with roots tracing back to the Arab Juhaysh tribe in Nineveh Province.

He earned his Bachelor of Medicine and Surgery degree from the University of Mosul in 1977, a fellowship from the Royal College of Surgeons in London in 2014, and the title of Professor of General and Laparoscopic Surgery in 2004. He spent one year attending training courses in Britain in 1993–1994, and worked as a visiting professor in the field of laparoscopic surgery in Kent, Britain.

== Career ==
=== Academia ===
From 1993 onwards, he served as a consultant professor in general and endoscopic surgery. and in 2005, he assumed the role of Dean of the College of Medicine at the University of Mosul, where he served until 2010. In 2011 and 2012, he held the position of professor of surgery at the College of Medicine at Al-Hashimiyah University, and From 2012 to 2014, he served as the President of Tikrit University. In 2014, he was appointed as the President of Ninawa University, a position he held until August 9, 2020. He later resumed the role of Dean of the College of Medicine at the University of Mosul.

Additionally, during his tenure, he led the engineering advisory team responsible for overseeing the development of Al-Hamdaniya University. He participated in numerous conferences and workshops in France, Jordan, Saudi Arabia, Tunisia, Syria, Iraq, and Britain. He has many research papers published in Iraqi scientific and academic journals.

=== Politics ===
He assumed the administration of the province of Nineveh after the dismissal of the former governor, Nofal Al-Akoub following the 2019 Mosul ferry sinking.

He headed the “Opinion of Nineveh” coalition and allied with the Taqaddam Party, headed by Muhammad al-Halbousi, to run in the 2021 Iraqi legislative elections. Al-Khayyat won the majority of votes in the constituency he ran in.

He currently holds the position of chairman of the Parliamentary Education Committee.

== Personal life ==
Al-Khayyat survived an assassination attempt during the period when professors at the University of Mosul were being targeted, while serving as Dean of the College of Medicine in 2008. He was seriously injured by gunfire as he left his office at the college, but survived and recovered after receiving treatment.

He was a hobbyist athlete in his youth, playing football and basketball, as a member of the basketball team. He moved to play with Al-Yarmouk Club after it merged with Al-Intisar Club, then moved to Al-Futuwa Club. He became part of the University of Mosul basketball team and scored high points in several games. He participated in the Second Sports Tournament in Basra in 1972 and in tournaments held in Aleppo, Syria, in 1974, and in Baalbek, Lebanon. He was also a member of the administrative body of the Iraqi National Union of Students, Nineveh Branch, from 1972 to 1976 and became a member of the Central Council of the Union until 1976.

== Selected works ==
- “The Goals of Higher Education”, in collaboration with Haseeb Elias Hadid, Dar Al-Kutub Al-Ilmiyyah, 2014 ISBN 9782745185211

== Sources ==
- Haddad, Haseeb Elias, and Muzahim Al-Khayyat. (2014). "Objectives of Higher Education." Beirut, Lebanon: Dar Al-Kitab Al-Ilmiyah. p. 127. ISBN 9782745185211.
- "Muzahim Al-Khayyat: The Human and the Physician – Author: Abdul Jabbar Al-Jubouri." Archived from the original on November 6, 2021. Accessed on November 6, 2021.
- "College of Medicine, University of Mosul." Archived from the original on November 6, 2021. Accessed on November 6, 2021.
- "Minister of Higher Education and Scientific Research Attends the Electronic Handover Ceremony of the Presidency of Ninevah University." Ninevah University. August 9, 2020. Archived from the original on September 1, 2021. Accessed on November 5, 2021.
- "Cabinet Grants Additional Powers to the Head of the Crisis Cell in Nineveh, Muzahim Al-Khayyat." baghdadtoday.news. Archived from the original on November 7, 2021. Accessed on November 5, 2021.
- "Muzahim Al-Khayyat 'Governor' of Mosul Until the Conclusion of the Ferry Investigation." Sky Press. Archived from the original on March 28, 2019. Accessed on November 5, 2021.
- "Cabinet Grants Extra Powers to the Head of the Crisis Cell in Nineveh." Al Ghad News 24. April 23, 2019. Archived from the original on November 7, 2021. Accessed on November 5, 2021.
- "Muzahim Al-Khayyat Allies with the 'Progress' Party, Led by Al-Halbousi, and Promises a Special Program for the Reconstruction of Mosul." IQ News. Archived from the original on November 5, 2021. Accessed on November 5, 2021.
- "Mawazin Publishes Election Results in Nineveh." www.mawazin.net. Archived from the original on October 11, 2021. Accessed on November 5, 2021.
- "Education and Teaching Committee Condemns the Assassination Attempt on Dr. Muzahim Al-Khayyat..." parliamentiraq.com. Archived from the original on November 6, 2021. Accessed on November 6, 2021.
- [Link to IASJ Search for Muzahim Al-Khayyat's publications.](https://www.iasj.net/iasj/search?query=au:"مزاحم الخياط") Archived on April 6, 2022, via Wayback Machine.
