= 2021 Baghdad clashes =

Clashes between Pro-Iran demonstrators and Iraqi police

- Part of the 2021–2022 Iraqi political crisis
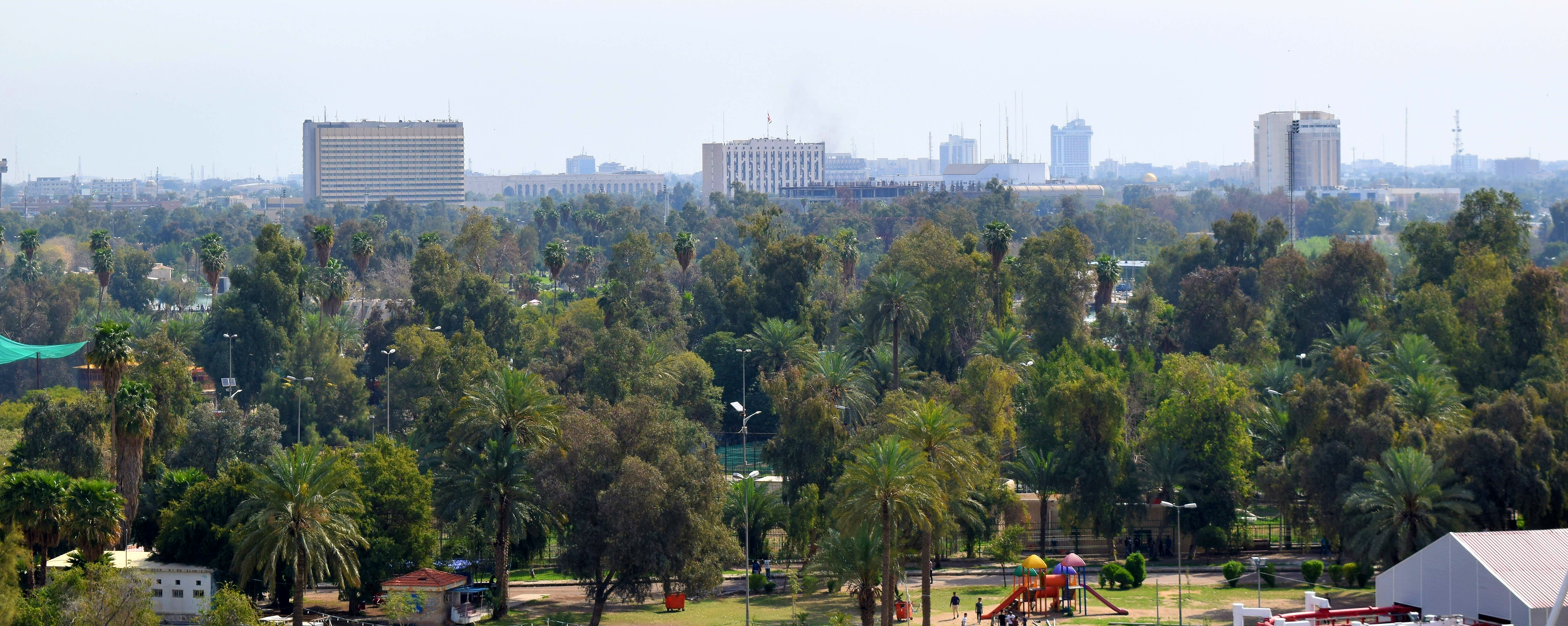
- Green Zone, Baghdad
- Date: 5 November 2021
- Location: Green Zone, Baghdad, Iraq
- Caused by: Results of the 2021 Iraqi election; Pro-Iran parties losing seats in the Iraqi parliament
- Goals: Election vote recount; Pro-Iran parties regaining lost seats; Maintain Iranian influence in Iraq
- Methods: Demonstrations; Riots; Barricades; Sit-ins; Civil disobedience
- Result: Iraqi government victory; protest shut down; Assassination attempt on Prime Minister Mustafa Al-Kadhimi

Parties
(Iraq) Protestors; Hezbollah Brigades supporters; Asa'ib Ahl al-Haq supporters; Al-Sadiqoun supporters; Badr Organisation supporters; Islamic Dawa Party supporters; QSS supporters; Imam Ali Brigades supporters; Team Media War	Iraq; Iraqi Security Forces; Iraqi Police

Lead figures
(Iraq) Non-centralized leadership	(Iraq) Mustafa Al-Kadhimi (Iraq) Barham Salih; Raed Shaker Jawdat

Casualties and losses
2 killed; 125 injured	0 killed; 9 injured

The 2021 Baghdad clashes were a civil conflict between Iraqi protesters and Iraqi security forces following the 2021 Iraqi election. The protestors were supporters of Iran-backed militias and political parties. The clashes left two dead and more than 125 injured.

== Background ==
The violence was fueled by the results of the 2021 Iraqi election which took place in October. Supporters of pro-Iranian groups, which suffered large losses in the polls, tried to storm the Green Zone, they threw stones at security forces, who fired tear gas and shot in the air to disperse the crowd. The protestors were mainly people affiliated with Iran-backed militias and Pro-Iran political parties. Some of the militias were Kata'ib Hezbollah, Asaib Ahl al-Haq, Badr Organization (militia wing), Kata'ib al-Imam Ali and Quwat al-Shaheed al-Sadr (militia wing of the Islamic Dawa Party), which are all part of the PMF. Some of the political parties were the Islamic Dawa Party, and the Fatah Alliance, which includes the Badr Organisation (political wing), the Al-Sadiqoun Bloc (the political wing of Asa'ib Ahl al-Haq), and much more, the Fatah Alliance are all close allies of the PMF.

== Clashes ==
It was the first major clash between in Iraq since the election. Protesters threw stones and tried storming into the Green Zone, an area in Baghdad which holds all government buildings and embassies. Protesters threw projectiles and blocked all access to the Green Zone, until police pushed them out. Police fired at the protesters and also used tear gas. Security forces were accused of burning tents set up by protesters.

== Aftermath ==
The clashes left 125 people injured and two people dead. 21 protesters were injured by smoke inhalation, and nine police officers were hurt from getting stones thrown at them. Prime Minister Mustafa Al-Kadhimi ordered a full investigation into the events, while President Barham Salih called for restraint. Nouri Al-Maliki, former Prime Minister of Iraq, said on Twitter that “protesters were ‘claiming their legitimate rights’, but should not have fueled the violence and should’ve avoided provoking security forces in the first place”. Qais al-Khazali, leader of the Iran-backed Asaib Ahl al-Haq, condemned the violence and urged justice for the wounded demonstrators. In Khazali's own words, “Whoever they were, they must be held accountable”, referring to the security forces.

Two days later on the 7 November, an assassination attempt was made on Prime Minister Mustafa Al-Kadhimi via a drone strike. The PM survived the attack unharmed but resulted in six of his bodyguards being injured. The security forces opened fire on demonstrators, leading to at least two deaths. The assassination attempt was connected to these protests, as a militia source who requested to remain anonymous said it was done by a Shia militia, most likely Kataib Hezbollah or Asaib Ahl al-Haq. The weapons used in the assassination attempt were made in Iran.

== See also ==
- Attack on the United States embassy in Baghdad
- 2012–2013 Iraqi protests
- 2015–2018 Iraqi protests
- 2019–2021 Iraqi protests
- Politics of Iraq
- Attack on the Al-Habboubi Square (2020)
- 2021 Erbil rocket attacks
- 2020 Kurdish protests in Sulaymaniyah Governorate
- 2022 Iraqi political crisis
- 2022 Baghdad clashes
