= Haibat al-Halbousi =

Iraqi politician

His Excellency Shiekh Haibat al-Halbousi
- هيبت الحلبوسي
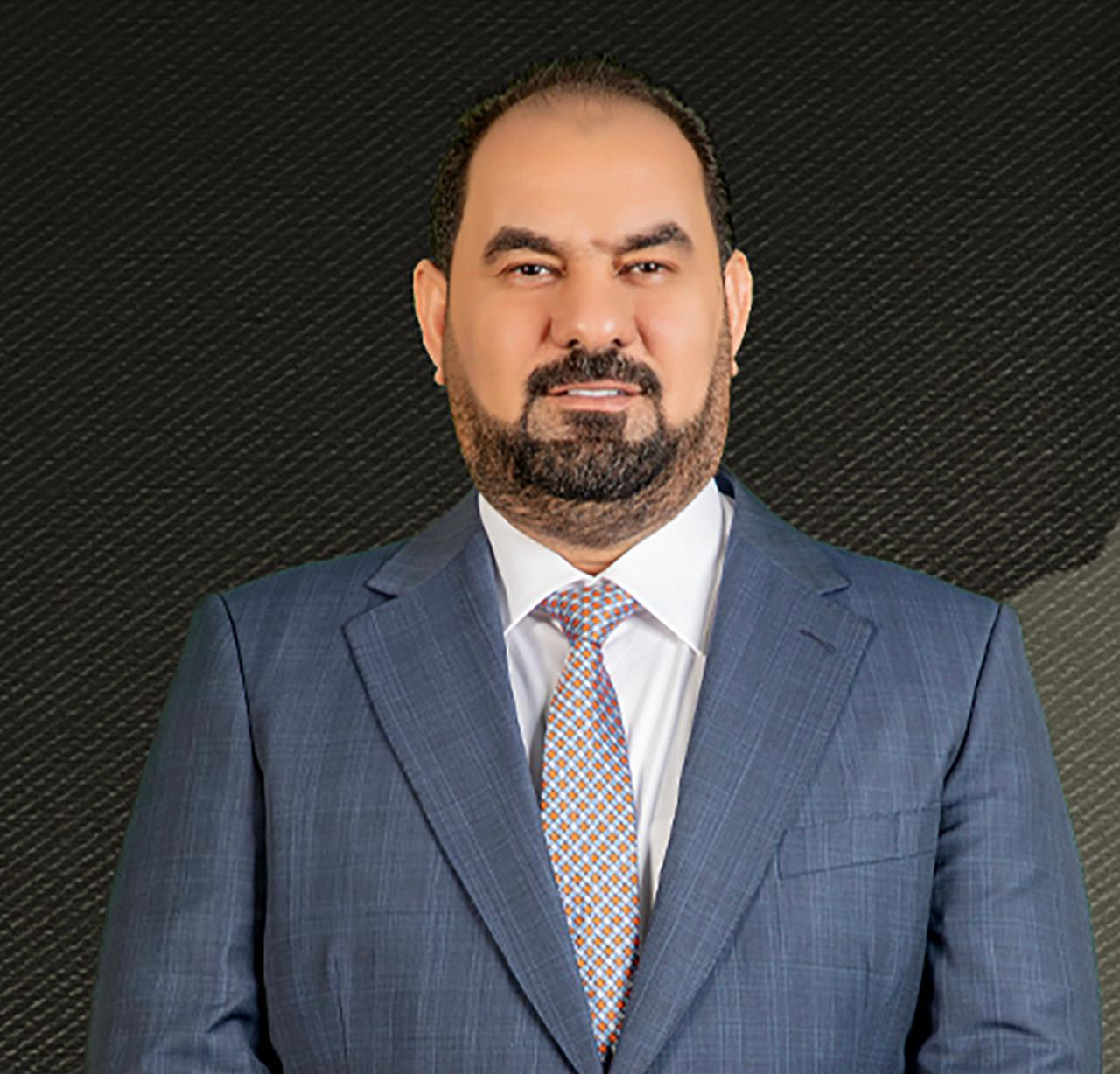
- Al-Halbousi in 2021

Speaker of the Council of Representatives
- Incumbent
- Assumed office 29 December 2025
- Preceded by: Mahmoud al-Mashhadani

Member of the Council of Representatives
- Incumbent
- Assumed office 3 September 2018
- Constituency: Al Anbar Governorate

Personal details
- Born: Haibat Hamad Abbas al-Halbousi al-Dulaimi; January 13, 1980 (age 46) Anbar, Iraq
- Party: Progress Party (Since 2019)
- Education: Mustansiriya University (BSc, MSc)

Haibat Hamad Abbas al-Halbousi al-Dulaimi (Arabic: هيبت حمد عباس الحلبوسي الدليمي; born January 13, 1980) is an Iraqi politician serving as the Speaker of the Council of Representatives of Iraq since December 2025. A member of the Progress Party, he served as Chairman of the Oil and Energy Committee in the Council of Representatives from 2019 to 2025.

== See also ==
- Mohammed al-Halbousi
- Mahmoud al-Mashhadani
