= Mohammed Nouri Al-Karbouli =

Iraqi politician (born 1980)

- محمد نوري الكربولي

Minister of Industry and Minerals
- Incumbent
- Assumed office 14 May 2026
- President: Nizar Amidi
- Prime Minister: Ali al-Zaidi
- Preceded by: Khalid Najim

Personal details
- Born: Mohammed Nouri Ahmed Al-Karbouli; 29 November 1980 (age 45)
- Party: Progress Party
- Education: University of Baghdad

Mohammed Nouri Ahmed Al-Karbouli (Note: Arabic: محمد نوري أحمد الكربولي, romanized: Muḥammad Nūrī ʾAḥmad al-Karbūlī) (born 29 November 1980) is an Iraqi politician who served as the Governor of Al Anbar Governorate from 2024 to 2025. He has served as Minister of Industry and Minerals in the Ali al-Zaidi government since 14 May 2026.

== Biography ==
Mohammed Nouri Ahmed Al-Karbouli was born on 29 November 1980 in Al Karabla Subdistrict, within Al Qaim District in western Al Anbar Governorate. His father was an officer in the Iraqi Army. After completing his studies in Al Qaim, he moved to Ramadi to continue his academic and professional career. He earned a bachelor's degree in Administration and Economics from University of Baghdad and a Master of Business Administration (MBA) from Modern University for Business and Science in Lebanon.

He was one of the founders and a member of the political party Progress Party. He later moved to the Iraqi capital, Baghdad, where he served as director of the office of Mohamed Al-Halbousi for five consecutive years. He subsequently assumed the office of Governor of Al Anbar Governorate, becoming the first person born in Al Qaim to hold that position.
