= 2022 Baghdad clashes =

Intra-Shiite clashes in Iraq

- Part of the 2021–2022 Iraqi political crisis
- Date: 29 – 30 August 2022
- Location: Green Zone, Baghdad, Iraq
- Caused by: Results of the 2021 Iraqi election; Muqtada al-Sadr's announcement of his retirement from politics
- Methods: Rioting; Civil disobedience; Sit-in
- Result: Nouri al-Maliki withdrew from the premiership

Parties
(Iraq) Protestors: Sadrist Movement supporters; Peace Companies	(Iraq) Counter-protesters: Popular Mobilization Forces; (Iraq) Coordination Framework supporters	Government of Iraq: Iraqi Security Forces; Iraqi Police

Lead figures
(Iraq) Non-centralized leadership	Hadi al-Amiri	(Iraq) Mustafa Al-Kadhimi (Iraq) Barham Salih; Raed Shaker Jawdat

Casualties and losses
30 killed; 590 injured	23 killed 380 wounded	0 killed; 110 injured

The 2022 Baghdad clashes was a civil conflict that broke out between supporters of Iraqi politician Muqtada al-Sadr and pro-Iranian forces, following Sadr's announcement of his resignation from politics. The move came after the resignation of Grand Ayatollah Kadhim Al-Haeri, the leader of his Iran-based Sadrist movement, which Sadr believed wasn't of his own volition. The unrest was considered the most serious crisis in the country since the defeat of ISIL in the country in 2017, since which Iraq has had relative stability. The clashes left at least 30 people dead and 700 more injured, including 110 members of the security forces.

== Background ==
Tensions between the two Shiite groups began with the 2021 parliamentary election when Iran-backed Shiite blocs lost seats to the Sadrist, an anti-Iranian movement. Despite winning the most seats in the election, the Sadrist failed to form a government and Sadr eventually pulled his political bloc from parliament in June 2022. Subsequently, the Iran-backed blocs tried to form a government, causing Sadrist protests outside parliament. Sadr has also called for the parliament to be dissolved and for snap elections to be held.

== Clashes ==
On 29 August 2022, hours after Sadr announced his withdrawal from politics, violent protests broke out in Baghdad, Iraq, between Muqtada al-Sadr's supporters and pro-Iranian forces. The Iraqi government remained mostly neutral during the clashes. Sadr's supporters stormed the Republican Palace in the Green Zone, reportedly accessing the pool. At 15:30 local time on 29 August, a curfew was declared in Baghdad. The same day, Sadr announced he would go on a hunger strike until the violence stopped.

As night fell, fighting worsened in the city with militia fighters firing several rockets into the Green Zone. The C-RAM air defence system belonging to the US embassy in Baghdad was also reportedly heard. By morning, Iraqi security forces had pushed protestors out of the Republican Palace and shut down government offices. Negotiations between the three sides were also reported. Later in the day, more protesters began to join the armed confrontations.

The clashes ended on 30 August when Sadr demanded that his supporters conduct a "peaceful revolution" and leave the Green Zone. He said he did not wish to be a part of a violent revolution and did not want Iraqi blood on his hands. He also thanked the Iraqi security forces for remaining impartial during the clashes. Following Sadr's speech, Hadi al-Amiri, leader of the pro-Iranian Hushd militia group, issued a statement calling for "dialogue".

There were also reports of protests throughout Iraq, including in the provinces of Basra, Dhi Qar, Maysan and Muthanna.

== Reactions ==
Calling the developments an "extremely dangerous escalation", the United Nations Assistance Mission for Iraq (UNAMI) called on all parties to "refrain from actions that could lead to an unstoppable chain of events".

United States National Security Council spokesman John Kirby said, "Security, stability and sovereignty should not be put at risk... We urge those involved to remain calm, to abstain from this violence and pursue peaceful avenues of redress."

== See also ==
- 2021 Baghdad clashes
- 2022 Tripoli clashes
