= Mahmoud al-Mashhadani =

1st Speaker of the Council of Representatives of Iraq

- محمود المشهداني
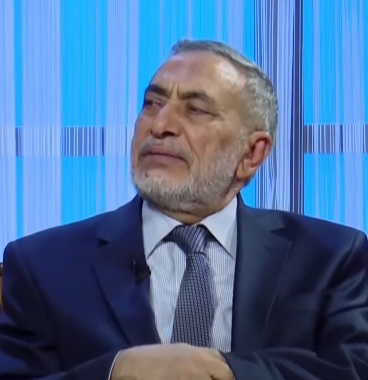
- Al-Mashhadani in 2021

Speaker of the Council of Representatives of Iraq
- In office 31 October 2024 – 29 December 2025
- President: Abdul Latif Rashid
- Prime Minister: Mohammed Shia' Al Sudani
- Deputy: Muhsin Al-Mandalawi; Shakhawan Abdulla
- Preceded by: Muhsin Al-Mandalawi (acting)
- Succeeded by: Haibat al-Halbousi
- In office 22 April 2006 – 23 December 2008
- President: Jalal Talabani
- Prime Minister: Nouri al-Maliki; Ibrahim al-Jaafari
- Preceded by: Hajim al-Hassani
- Succeeded by: Zakaria Al-Mashhadani

Personal details
- Born: 20 May 1948 (age 78) Baghdad, Kingdom of Iraq
- Party: Iraqi Accord Front
- Other political affiliations: Al-Wataniya Coalition (2012–present); Sadara (in 2024)
- Education: College of Medicine University of Baghdad

Military service
- Branch/service: Iraqi Ground Forces
- Years of service: 1975–1990
- Rank: Major
- Unit: Army Medical Corps
- Battles/wars: Second Iraqi–Kurdish War; Iran–Iraq War

Mahmoud Dawud al-Mashhadani (Arabic: محمود المشهداني; born 20 May 1948) is an Iraqi politician and former Speaker of the Council of Representatives of Iraq from October 2024 to December 2025.

He was elected to the Council of Representatives as part of the Sunni Arab-led Iraqi Accord Front list in 2005. He is currently a member of the al-Sadara bloc.

== Personal life ==
Born in 1948 in a Shi'ite district of Baghdad, he went to school in al-Khadhimiyah and graduated from Baghdad Medical College in 1972. He joined the medical corps of the Iraqi Army in 1975 as a Lieutenant and rose to the rank of Army Major. He was imprisoned for opposing the Gulf War in 1990 and sentenced to death, which was commuted to 15 years after payment of bribes. He was a founding member of the Iraqi National Dialogue Council.

== Political career ==
He was nominated to the speakership by the IAF after the main coalition in the Council of Representatives, the United Iraqi Alliance, objected to the nomination of Tariq Al-Hashimi. He was nominated as part of a deal on government posts between the IAF, UIA and Kurdistani Alliance. He was unanimously elected to the speakership on April 22, 2006, receiving 159 votes against 97 spoilt and 10 abstentions.

In June 2006, he met with U.S. President George W. Bush during Bush's "surprise visit" to Iraq. Upon his return to Washington, Bush said the following about Mashhadani at a press conference:

The Sunni—I was impressed, by the way, by the Speaker—Denny Hastert told me I'd like him; Denny met with him. And I was impressed by him. He's a fellow that had been put in prison by Saddam and, interestingly enough, put in prison by us. And he made a decision to participate in the government. And he was an articulate person. He talked about running the parliament. It was interesting to see a person that could have been really bitter talk about the skills he's going to need to bring people together to run the parliament. And I found him to be a hopeful person.

They tell me that he wouldn't have taken my phone call a year ago—I think I might have shared this with you at one point in time—and there I was, sitting next to the guy. And I think he enjoyed it as much as I did. It was a refreshing moment.

According to senior Iraq government officials, Dr. Mashhadani had been imprisoned by the United States because of his affiliations with Ansar al-Islam and Jaish Ansar al-Sunna in 2004.

In July 2006 Mashhadani told Al-Sharqiyah television the killings and kidnappings were the fault of "Jews, Israelis and Zionists ... using Iraqi money and oil to frustrate the Islamic movement in Iraq". He said the perpetrators were linked to Mossad and received their orders from Tel Aviv. He warned "the day will come when we purge our country of them". In that same interview, after being told about the kidnapping of a Sunni parliament member, Mashhadani replied with "Why kidnap this Muslim woman? Instead of Tayseer, why not kidnap Margaret or Jwan?", Margaret referring to Assyrian Christians and Jwan referring to Kurds. In late July 2006 at a speech before a UN-sponsored conference on transitional justice and reconciliation in Baghdad he said "Just get your hands off Iraq and the Iraqi people and Muslim countries, and everything will be all right." Later, in the same speech, he added, " What has been done in Iraq is a kind of butchery of the Iraqi people." He also added comments criticizing Israeli military action in Lebanon.

On September 6, 2006, Mashhadani expressed grave concern for the government of Iraq if its attempts at national reconciliation fail. "We have three to four months, and if the country does not survive this, the boat will sink," he said.

On June 10, 2007, political blocs in Iraq agreed to replace Mashhadani, most likely with another Sunni lawmaker. The consensus was reached after reports that Mashhadani's bodyguards assaulted a Shi'ite legislator, the culmination of a series of "thuggish" acts by the speaker. Mashhadani had also controversially called suicide bombers who kill Americans "heroes".

On December 17, 2008 he announced that he would resign over the chaos that had erupted in parliament among legislators over whether Muntadhar al-Zaidi, the journalist who threw his shoes at President George W. Bush at a December 14 press conference with Prime Minister Nouri al-Maliki, should be freed from jail. The Iraqi Parliament accepted his resignation on December 23.

On 13 March 2024, five parliamentarians including Mashhadani announced the creation of the al-Sadara coalition. In May, al-Sadara allied with the Progress Party.

On 31 November 2024, he was elected as the Speaker of the Council of Representatives with 182 votes, supported by the Progress Party and a coalition of Shia parties. On 5 August 2025, a dispute between Mashhadani and his first deputy speaker, Muhsin Al-Mandalawi, developed over the right to conduct parliamentary sessions. During the conflict 150 laws and 23 interpellations were stalled. Al-Aalem Al-Jadeed reported that Mashhadani led a "last-minute" meeting with Mandalawi and second deputy speaker Shakhawan Abdulla over the conflict on 21 August. The same day it was announced that the house of representatives would reconvene for three sessions the next week.

Preceded by Hajim al-Hassani	Speaker of the Council of Representatives of Iraq; April 2006 – December 2008	Succeeded by Ayad al-Samarrai
