= Ahmed Taha Abu Ragheef =

Iraqi officer

Ahmed Taha Hashim Abu Ragheef (أحمد أبو رغيف in Arabic) is an Iraqi military officer with the rank of First Lieutenant General.

== Education ==
Abu Ragheef is a graduate of the Police College. He holds bachelor’s, master’s and doctorate degrees in law.

== Career ==
He has held several different positions within the Iraqi security apparatus, such as the Deputy Assistant for Intelligence Affairs, the Assistant Director of Baghdad Police, the Assistant Chief of Baghdad Police, the Assistant Director of Interior Affairs, the Director of Interior Affairs, and the Assistant Undersecretary to the Director of the Intelligence Agency.

=== Anti-corruption committee ===
In August 2020, Iraqi Prime Minister Mustafa Al-Kadhimi announced the formation of a supreme investigation committee to investigate major corruption and criminal cases. It is a supreme investigative committee under the authority of the Office of the Commander-in-Chief of the Armed Forces. Former Prime Minister Al-Kadhimi chose Abu Ragheef to head the special commission who worked with his own team of investigators and judges.

In 2020, Committee 29 made the headlines for its publicized practices that included night raids during which security forces would arrest suspects. Abu Ragheef was even nicknamed in Iraq "the night visitor".

In March 2022, the committee was considered unconstitutional. Shortly after in November 2022, Abu Ragheef was dismissed, by the new government of Muhammad Shia Al-Sudani, marking the beginning of a series of position changes within the security sphere in Iraq. Major-General Maher Najm replaced Abu Ragheef at the head of the committee.

== Assassination attempt ==
According to the Ministry of Interior, Abu Ragheef survived an assassination attempt in Baghdad in May 2022

== See also ==
- Politics in Iraq
- Military in Iraq
- Corruption in Iraq
