= Speaker of the Council of Representatives of Iraq =

- Coat of arms of Iraq

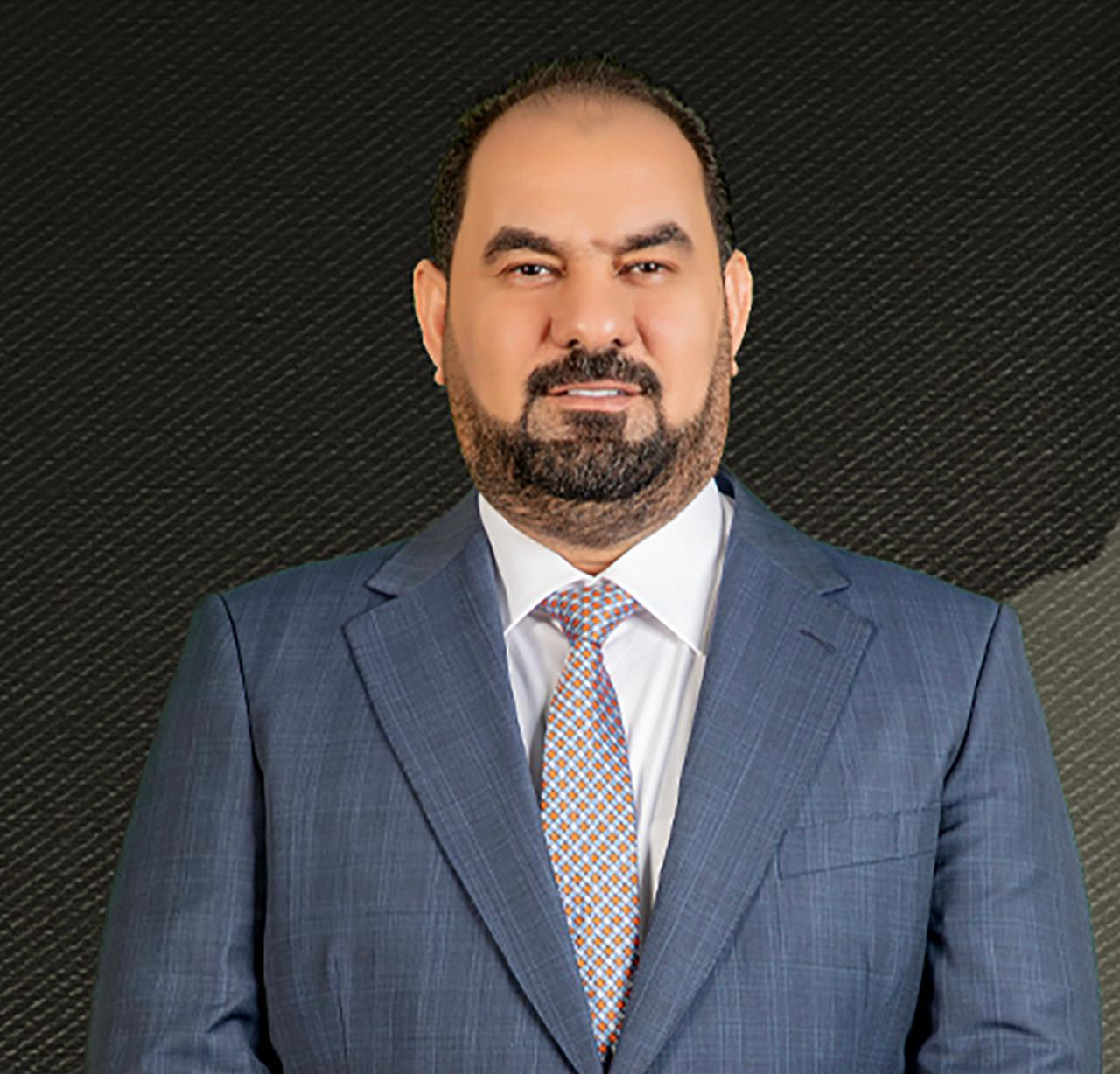
- Incumbent; Haibat al-Halbousi since 29 December 2025
- Appointer: Council of Representatives of Iraq
- Term length: 4 years
- Inaugural holder: Mahmoud al-Mashhadani (current incarnation)
- Formation: 16 March 2008 (current incarnation)

The speaker of the Council of Representatives of Iraq is the presiding officer of that legislature. The position was preceded by the Speaker of the National Assembly of Iraq, up to the Iraq War.

The role of the speaker is reserved for a Sunni Muslim as per ethno-sectarian quota to ensure diversity within Iraq's government. The role of first and second deputy speakers are respectively prearranged for a Shia and Kurdish politician as well.

Haibat al-Halbousi is the current incumbent speaker, being elected to the position on 29 December 2025.

== Speakers ==
=== Presidents of Senate of Iraq ===
The upper house from 1925 to 1958, see Senate of Iraq.

=== Presidents of Chamber of Deputies of Iraq ===
The lower house from 1925 to 1958, see Chamber of Deputies of Iraq.

Meaning
—	Acting speaker.
	Iraqi Regional Branch (Iraqi Ba'ath Party)
	Iraqi National List
	Iraqi Accord Front
	Coalition of Kurdistan Lists
	Iraqi National Movement
	Muttahidoon
	Takadum

=== Iraqi Republic (under Ba'ath Party) (1968–2005) === ==== Speaker of the National Assembly of Iraq (1980–2005) ====
№	Portrait	Name (Birth–Death)	Took office	Left office	Political party	Term	Convocation
1	—	Naim Haddad	1 July 1980	19 August 1983	Iraqi Ba'ath Party (Iraq Region)	1 (1980)	1st convocation (1980–1984)
2		Sa'dun Hammadi (1930–2007)	19 August 1983	31 October 1984	Iraqi Ba'ath Party (Iraq Region)	1 (1980)	1st convocation (1980–1984)
2		Sa'dun Hammadi (1930–2007)	31 October 1984	12 April 1989	Iraqi Ba'ath Party (Iraq Region)	2 (1984)	2nd convocation (1984–1989)
2		Sa'dun Hammadi (1930–2007)	12 April 1989	26 April 1989	Iraqi Ba'ath Party (Iraq Region)	3 (1989)	3rd convocation (1989–1996)
3	—	Sa'adi Mahdi Salih	26 April 1989	9 November 1995	Iraqi Ba'ath Party (Iraq Region)	1 (1989)	3rd convocation (1989–1996)
2		Sa'dun Hammadi (1930–2007)	8 April 1996	9 April 2000	Iraqi Ba'ath Party (Iraq Region)	1 (1996)	4th convocation (1996–2000)
2		Sa'dun Hammadi (1930–2007)	9 April 2000	9 April 2003	Iraqi Ba'ath Party (Iraq Region)	2 (2000)	5th convocation (2000–2003)
=== Republic of Iraq (2005–present) === ==== Speaker of the Transitional National Assembly (2005–2006) ====
№	Portrait	Name (Birth–Death)	Took office	Left office	Political party	Term	Convocation
1		Hajim al-Hassani (1954–)	3 April 2005	16 March 2006	Iraqi National List	1 (2005 (Jan))	1st convocation (2005–2006)
==== Speaker of the Council of Representatives (2006–present) ====
№	Portrait	Name (Birth–Death)	Took office	Left office	Political party	Term	Convocation
1		Mahmoud al-Mashhadani (1948–)	16 March 2006	23 December 2008	Iraqi Accord Front	1 (2005 (Dec))	1st convocation (2006–2010)
2	—	Ayad al-Samarrai (1946–)	19 April 2009	14 June 2010	Iraqi Accord Front	1 (2005 (Dec))	1st convocation (2006–2010)
—		Fouad Masoum (1938–)	14 June 2010	11 November 2010	Coalition of Kurdistan Lists	(acting)	2nd convocation (2010–2014)
3		Usama al-Nujayfi (1956–)	11 November 2010	15 July 2014	Iraqi National Movement / Muttahidoon	1 (2010)	2nd convocation (2010–2014)
4		Salim al-Jabouri (1971–)	15 July 2014	1 July 2018	Muttahidoon	1 (2014)	3rd convocation (2014–2018)
5		Mohammed Al-Halbousi (1981–)	15 September 2018	10 October 2021	Al Anbar Our Identity	1 (2018)	4th convocation (2018–2021)
5		Mohammed Al-Halbousi (1981–)	10 October 2021	14 November 2023	Takadum	2 (2021)	5th convocation (2021-2025)
—		Muhsin Al-Mandalawi (1968–)	14 November 2023	31 October 2024	Independent	(acting)	5th convocation (2021-2025)
6		Mahmoud al-Mashhadani (1948–)	31 October 2024	29 December 2025	Independent	2	5th convocation (2021-2025)
7		Haibat al-Halbousi (1980–)	29 December 2025	Incumbent	Takadum	1 (2025)	6th convocation (2025-2029)

== See also ==
- President of Iraq
  - List of presidents of Iraq
- Vice President of Iraq
- Prime Minister of Iraq
  - List of prime ministers of Iraq
- Ministry of Foreign Affairs (Iraq)
