= Committee 29 =

Iraqi anti-corruption commission

Committee 29, also known as "Committee Abu Ragheef" (in Arabic: لجنة ابو رغيف) or "Anti-Corruption Committee", is an Iraqi commission dedicated to the fight against corruption. It was headed by the Undersecretary of the Ministry of Interior for Intelligence Affairs Abu Ragheef.

== Creation ==
The anti-corruption entity was established by prime minister Mustafa Al-Kadhimi. The decision to create the committee was made on August 27, 2020, and was published on September 3, 2020. The campaign came about after the statement of the Grand Ayatollah Sistani, that followed a meeting with the United Nations representative in Iraq, Jeanine Blaskhart, in which he called for taking serious steps to investigate and combat corruption cases and important crimes.

== Activities ==
More than 52 political and administrative officials have been targeted by a warrant issued by the commission. 36 suspects have been arrested in the framework of investigations led by the committee and 16 have received legal sentences by Iraqi judicial courts.

== Controversies and allegations ==
The committee was accused of using solitary confinement, torture, and sexual violence to extract confessions from senior Iraqi officials, prominent businessmen, previous governments, former agents in addition to some military and security personalities.

In 2021, the Iraqi Commissioner for Human Rights, Ali Al-Bayati, revealed that he received many complaints about former detainees accusing the anti-corruption commission of torture and other abuses. He was later targeted for these revelations.

The committee was also the subject of a 9-month investigation led by the Washington Post published in December 2022 that revealed multiple alleged abuses committed by the anti-corruption commission.

It was exposed that nearly dozens of people were arrested without judicial orders and subject to these types of psychological and physical torture, including sleep deprivation, beatings with sticks, electric shocks and the use of pre-written confessions.

In May 2023, the former head of the anti-corruption committee General Abu Ragheef was arrested and detained following an "explicit directive" from the Interior Minister Abdul-Amir al-Shammari amid allegations of corruption and inhumane practices.

== Cancellation ==
It was decided on March 2, 2022, by the Federal Supreme Court in Iraq to terminate the Abu Ragheef Committee as a result of "its violation of the provisions of the constitutional that guaranteed the protection of human freedom and dignity and the principle of separation of powers and independence of judiciary."

The court mentioned in a statement that it had issued a decision stating that "Diwani Order No.29 of 2020, which includes the formation of a permanent committee to investigate corruption cases and important crimes, is not valid and canceled as of the verdict".

In October 2022, new Iraqi Prime Minister Mohammed Shia al-Sudani appointed a human rights advisor to receive complaints related to the committee. In December 2022, after the publication of the Washington Post article, Prime Minister al-Sudani announced that "any party that used and extracted confessions by force would be held to account".
