= Muhsin Al-Mandalawi =

Iraqi businessman and politician (born 1968)

- محسن المندلاوي
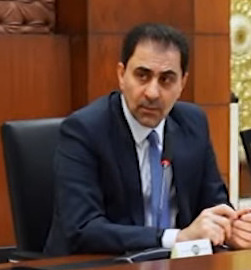
- Al-Mandalawi in 2023

Deputy Prime Minister of Iraq
- Incumbent
- Assumed office October 15th 2026
- President: Nizar Amidi
- Prime Minister: Ali al Zaidi

Acting Speaker of the Council of Representatives
- In office 14 November 2023 – 31 October 2024
- Preceded by: Mohamed Al-Halbousi
- Succeeded by: Mahmoud al-Mashhadani

Personal details
- Born: 26 July 1968 (age 58) Mandali, Diyala, Iraq
- Education: Al-Farahidi University
- Profession: Businessman
- Religion: Shia Islam

Muhsin Ali Akbar Namdar Nazar Al-Mandalawi (Arabic: محسن علي اكبر نامدار نظر المندلاوي; born 26 July 1968) is an Iraqi businessman, politician and a former member of the Iraqi Council of Representatives serving as the deputy prime minister of Iraq as of 15 October 2026. He was elected as the Emir of the Feyli National council in Iraq by the tribal sheikhs, and he is currently representing the Feylis political interests in Iraq.

He is the head of the Iraqi Al-Asas Alliance, chairman of the board of directors of the International Hospital for Specialized Surgery, and chairman of the board of directors of Al-Farahidi University.

On October 15th 2026, Muhsin al Mandalawi was elected as deputy prime minister along with two others.

== Early life and education ==
Al-Mandalawi was born on 26 July 1968 in Mandali, Iraq, to a Shia Feyli Kurdish family. He and his family and thousands of other Feylis were forcibly displaced to Iran by the Baathi regime in the 1980s. They returned to Iraq after the toppling of Saddam Hussein in 2003. He has a bachelor's and master’s degree in media studies from Al-Farahidi University in Baghdad, as well as a diploma from the University of Technology, Baghdad.

== Political career ==
On October 10, 2021, he received 5,385 votes in the fifth district of Baghdad Governorate, and was chosen as the first deputy speaker of the Iraqi Council of Representatives on September 29, 2022.

On July 28, 2022, after the ousting of Mohamed al-Halbousi, Al-Mandalawi succeeded him in acting capacity after being nominated by the Coordination Framework. He was acting Speaker of the Council of Representatives from 15 November 2023 to 31 October 2024.
