= 2022 Iraq parliament attack =

2022 storming of Iraqi parliament

- Part of the 2021–2022 Iraqi political crisis
- Date: 27 July 2022 – 30 August 2022
- Location: Baghdad, Iraq
- Caused by: Corruption in the Iraqi government; Leaks attributed to Nouri Al Maliki
- Goals: Expel corruption; Put Nouri al Maliki on trial
- Methods: Protests; Sit-ins; Demonstrations
- Status: Ended

Parties
Sadrist Movement; Peace Companies	Government of Iraq; Coordination Framework

Lead figures
Muqtada al-Sadr	Mustafa Al-Kadhimi; Nouri Al-Maliki; Ammar al-Hakim; Qais Khazali

Casualties and losses
100+ injured	25 injured

On 27 July 2022, hundreds of Iraqi demonstrators supporting Iraqi Shiite cleric Muqtada al-Sadr stormed the Council of Representatives of Iraq building located in the Green Zone in the Iraqi capital Baghdad. The storming, known as the "Ashura Revolution" (Arabic: ثورة عاشوراء) or the "Muharram Revolution" (ثورة محرم الحرام) by Sadrists, came after news was leaked about the nomination of Shiite forces opposed to the Sadrist movement, Mohammed Shia' Al Sudani, for the position of prime minister of Iraq.

Earlier in July, al-Sadr effectively vetoed the candidacy of rival Nouri al-Maliki, accusing the former premier of corruption in a tweet. Incumbent Iraqi Prime Minister Mustafa Al-Kadhimi called for the protestors to "immediately withdraw", and after a public message by al-Sadr to "pray and go home," the crowd dispersed, although they returned a week later after al-Sadr called on them to not miss the "golden opportunity" to demand reforms.

== Raid ==
On 27 July, angry about the influence of Iran in Iraqi domestic governance, followers of al-Sadr breached the Green Zone and the Iraqi Parliament in Baghdad. Although after a public message by al-Sadr to "pray and go home," the crowd dispersed. Thousands of supporters of Muqtada al-Sadr have been camping in the parliament building since 27 July. On 30 July, al-Sadr called on them to raid the parliament again, and at least 125 people have been injured, including 100 civilians and 25 Iraqi soldiers, according to the Iraqi Ministry of Health.

== Siege ==
From 29 July to 31 July protesters stormed, occupied and sieged the Iraq Parliament in support for Shia leader Muqtada al-Sadr. Hundreds of protesters were injured in clashes with the Iraqi Security Force. After being cleared from the parliament, protesters organized sit-ins and other forms of demonstration outside the parliament.

== Battle in Al-Khadraa District ==
On 31 August, the protestors broke into the Presidential Palace in the afternoon and initiated a sit-in there. However, many protestors would be shot as they pulled out of the palace. It is unclear who started the fighting first, However, a huge battle broke out between presumably the Mahdi Army (or Peace Companies), and several militias affiliating with the Coordination Network (Badr Organization, Asa'ib Ahl al-Haq).

The battle continued until the afternoon of the next day, and it quickly spread to Iraq's south, Asa'ib and Badr headquarters were forcefully shut down by local Sadrist militants in many areas, Several people from both sides were reported dead by the afternoon of the next day. Muqtada Al-Sadr gave a speech that condemned the attack and ordered all armed operations and all protests to end in Al-Khadraa. That ended the riots that had continued for months.

== See also ==
- List of attacks on legislatures
