= Corruption in Iraq =

Corruption in Iraq is pervasive at all levels of government. In 2021, President Barham Salih stated that US$150 billion of oil money had been stolen and smuggled out of Iraq in corrupt deals since the 2003 U.S. invasion. Endemic corruption pervades Iraq's oil and gas sectors, which still account for more than 99 percent of the country's exports and 85 percent of the government's budget. The Iraqi economy is predominantly a cash economy, making it almost impossible to trace the amount or the path the money follows.

Transparency International's Corruption Perceptions Index scores 182 countries on a scale from 0 ("highly corrupt") to 100 ("very clean") and then ranks the countries by their score; the country ranked first is perceived to have the most honest public sector. From 2013 to 2025, the Corruption Perceptions Index indicated that the Iraqi public sector was seriously corrupt but improving: Iraq's score remained constant or rose every year, rising from 16 to 28 over the thirteen years. Its 2025 score of 28 ranked it 136th of 182 countries. For comparison with regional scores, the average score among Middle Eastern and North African countries (Note: Algeria, Bahrain, Egypt, Iran, Iraq, Israel, Jordan, Kuwait, Lebanon, Libya, Morocco, Oman, Qatar, Saudi Arabia, Syria, Tunisia, United Arab Emirates, and Yemen) was 39. The best score among Middle Eastern and North African countries was 69 and the worst score was 13. For comparison with worldwide scores, the average score was 42, the best score was 89 (ranked 1), and the worst score was 9 (ranked 181 in a two-way tie).

== Dynamics ==
Political parties and public servants are considered corrupt, and petty corruption is highly institutionalized in Iraqi society.

Corruption is considered an obstacle to doing business in Iraq, and red tape and inefficiency continue to persist. Government contracting is an area reported to be affected by high levels of illicit activity, and public contracts are often awarded to companies connected to political leaders. Investors may come under pressure to take on well-connected local partners to avoid bureaucratic hurdles.

Corruption in Iraq is endemic, systemic, and the main threat to Iraq's stability after the defeat of ISIS.

== Significant episodes of corruption ==
In an Al Jazeera investigation, residents of Harthiya, a neighborhood in Baghdad alleged severe corruption in the construction sector. The neighborhood has experienced a construction boom since the 2003 invasion. Despite the many construction infractions, only a fraction of the revenue from government fines reaches the state treasury. Iraqi civil servants go around the neighborhood to inspect construction sites. When they spot wrongdoings, such as an extra floor in a building, an agreement is struck with the developer. The public official takes a bribe and in return, the state employee reduces the fine. The contractor pays the ticket and continues the project. Even if the builder pays in full, the fines are too small to deter construction companies when compared to the lucrative construction sector.

In the summer of 2022, an Iraqi anti-corruption commission uncovered a massive corruption scandal where US$700 million had been stolen from Iraqi state banks. The fraud resulted in a state of chaos and instability in government banking systems.

In October 2022, Iraq's acting finance minister Ihsan Jabbar shocked the nation by announcing an investigation into US$2.5 billion that had gone missing from Iraq's General Commission for Taxes, a department in the Ministry of Finance. It was described as "the heist of the century".

In October 2022, the Federal Commission of Integrity announced it started an investigation into a theft of 3.7 trillion Iraqi dinars ($2.5 billion). Those funds were allegedly stolen from the Tax Authority account. According to several publications based on the declaration of the Iraqi Finance Ministry, the money was reportedly transferred from the account of a governmental agency held by the Rafidain Bank to 5 companies in 2021 and 2022.

Later in November 2022, Prime Minister Al-Sudani announced that Iraq recovered a part of the money stolen. According to him, one of the businessmen involved in the scandal Nour Zouhair Jassem, who admitted receiving a part of the funds, gave back around US$125 million.

In March 2023, Iraq's former Prime Minister, Mustafa Al-Kadhimi claimed in an interview that corruption cost the country US$600 billion between 2003 and mid-2020.

In November 2024, Iraq's anti-corruption agency began an inquiry after an audio recording emerged, allegedly showing prime ministerial aide Abdel Karim Al-Faisal accepting a bribe. Al-Faisal has denied the claim.

== Protests and political impacts ==
In 2015, mass protests against corruption were observed in the capital Baghdad and in main large cities. Protesters were denouncing the low quality of public services as well as the regular power cuts the population suffers. They called for the authorities to take action, denouncing them as "corrupt" and "thieves". The higher Shiite leader at the time, Grand Ayatollah Ali al-Sistani, even called for Prime Minister Haider al-Abadi to take a strong stance against corruption. These protests became occasional and were organized from time to time from 2015 until 2018.

Iraqi dissatisfaction with corruption boiled over with large protests in 2018, and again in 2019 as part of ongoing protests, of which corruption in Iraq is one of the main causes, among several.

Corruption in Iraq and subsequent ongoing protests of 2018 and 2019 resulted in the resignation of Prime Minister Adil Abdul Mahdi on November 30, 2019. He was replaced by Mustafa Al-Kadhimi in May 2020.

A 2013 survey by Transparency International indicated that a majority of Iraqis were dissatisfied with the government's efforts in fighting corruption. In 2019, over 80% of Iraqis were concerned about worsening corruption at the highest levels of government.

== Anti-corruption governmental entities ==
In August 2020, the Iraqi Prime Minister, Mustafa Al-Kadhimi, announced the formation of a supreme investigation committee called Committee 29 or "Abu Ragheef Committee" (Court order No. 29) to deal with major corruption and criminal offenses. The special commission was placed under the authority of the Office of the Commander-in-Chief of the Armed Forces, and headed by Lieutenant General Ahmed Taha Abu Ragheef.

The Commission of Integrity is an independent entity in charge of investigating cases of corruption committed at every level of the State. It was created in 2004 by the Iraqi Governing Council. The commission had several changes following the replacement of its director in November 2022: Judge Alaa Jawad Al-Saadi resigned as he considered he could not properly pursue his mission as the head of the entity after the commission was subject to campaigns of "distortion" and "defamation". The Iraqi Prime Minister accepted the resignation and nominated Judge Haider Hanoun Zayer to head the commission.

In November 2022, the new Iraqi Prime Minister Al-Sudani, who expressed his will to make the fight against corruption one of his top priorities, announced the creation of a Supreme Anti-Corruption Commission to accelerate the investigation of major corruption files and the recovery of those wanted.

== Anti-corruption crackdown ==
In May 2026, Iraq's newly appointed Prime Minister Ali al-Zaidi took office pledging to confront state corruption and assert the state's monopoly on weapons. The arrest of a senior oil official shortly after his appointment underscored al-Zaidi's stance on corruption, marking a shift from financial investigations toward direct law enforcement action against the political elite.

=== Arrest of Adnan al-Jumaili ===
In late May 2026, Adnan al-Jumaili, deputy oil minister for refining affairs, was arrested by a special force and a team from the Federal Integrity Commission in Salaheddin province. Communications Minister Mustafa Sanad described him as the "whale" of the Oil Ministry, accusing him of being a financier of political parties and of siphoning funds from refineries in Beiji, Doura, Maysan, and Shuaiba.

Initial raids tied to the case turned up roughly $10 million in cash, 3 billion Iraqi dinars, 1.5 kg of gold, around 40 properties across Baghdad, Salaheddin, and Erbil, and large quantities of weapons. Al-Jumaili's subsequent statements during questioning led investigators to additional hidden caches of money, including funds buried underground that required excavators to recover; total seizures connected to the case reached approximately $107 million. Al-Zaidi alleged that al-Jumaili had attempted to secure his release by offering a $200 million bribe through an intermediary.

=== Baghdad Green Zone raids and mass arrests ===
On June 28–29, 2026, Iraqi security forces sealed off all entrances to Baghdad's Green Zone and carried out raids inside the compound housing key government institutions and foreign embassies. Iraq's Federal Commission of Integrity said the operation executed judicial arrest warrants against individuals accused of misappropriating public funds, stating the actions were carried out "with precision" and in accordance with the law. Officials said the arrests were based on confessions from al-Jumaili.

A total of 47 people were arrested, including 13 members of parliament, a deputy oil minister, and several current and former senior officials. Among those detained were Ali Maarij al-Bahadly, deputy oil minister for distribution affairs, and Muthanna al-Samarrai, leader of the Al-Azm Alliance, along with his office manager. Arrested lawmakers had their parliamentary immunity lifted beforehand. Al-Zaidi described the arrests as the start of a broader anti-corruption crackdown, though analysts noted the operation also raised questions about its timing amid Iraq's elite power struggles.

== See also ==
- 2015–2018 Iraqi protests
- 2019–2021 Iraqi protests
