= University of Al-Hamdaniya =

Public university in Iraq

Coordinates: 36.3015°N 43.4089°E

- جامعة الحمدانية
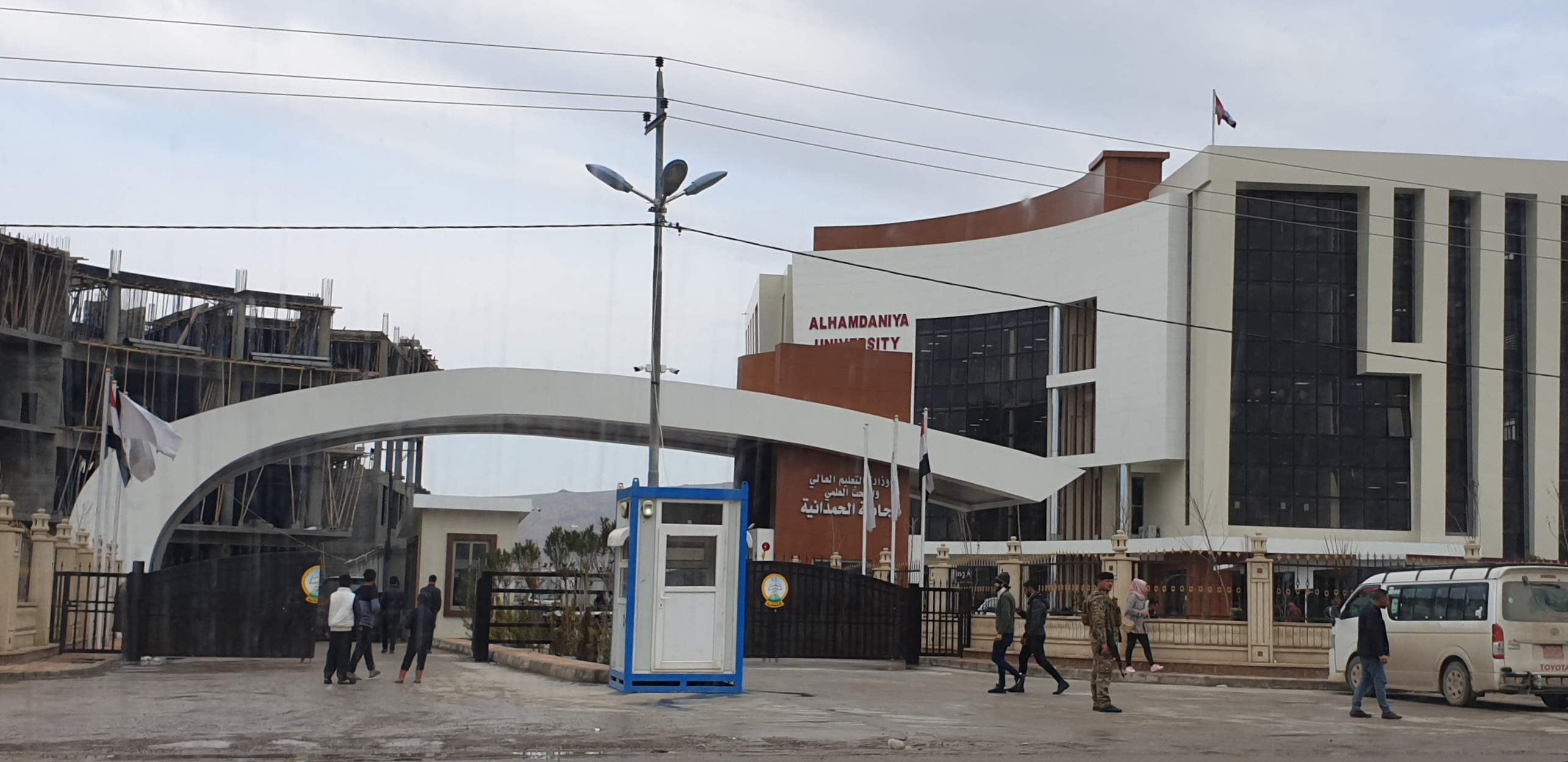
- Type: Public
- Established: 2014
- President: Prof. Dr. Aqeel Al-Araji
- Location: Ninevah Plain, Ninevah, Iraq
- Language: Arabic
- Website: https://www.uohamdaniya.edu.iq/en/

The University of Al-Hamdaniya. (Arabic: جامعة الحمدانية) is an Iraqi public university. It is based in Nineveh Plain. The main building is located near the Al-Hamdaniya intersection, Mosul-Erbil road, around 30 kilometers from Mosul. The University has another building located in Qaraqosh and some other buildings under construction in both Karamlesh and Bartella.

The University was established in 2014 and it belongs to the Iraqi Ministry of Scientific Research and Higher Education. It consists of two colleges: the College of Education, and the College of Administration and Economics. The University also has one research center, the Laser and Photonics Center. The University further includes a Computer Center. The Hammurabi Human Rights Organization contributed to the University's library, building modern shelves to store books, and also provided support to establish laboratories and a sports hall.

== The University Colleges ==
The College of Education: it has nine departments:

- The Department of Computer Science.
- The Department of Mathematics.
- The Department of Physics.
- The Department of Arabic Language.
- The Department of English Language.
- The Department of Geography.
- The Department of History.
- The Department of Psychology.
- The Sport Department.

The College of Administration and Economics: it includes two departments: The Department of Accounting, and the Department of Administration.
