= Attempted assassination of Mustafa Al-Kadhimi =

2021 assassination attempt in Iraq

- Part of the Iraqi conflict and the aftermath of the 2021 Baghdad clashes
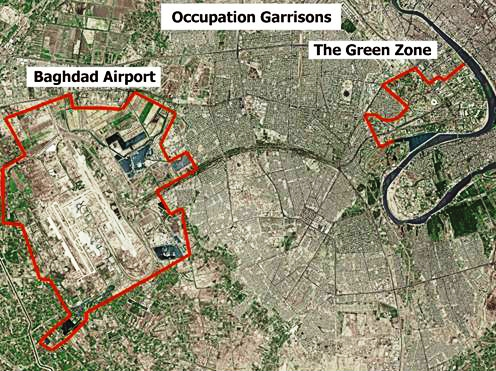
- The residence of the Prime Minister of Iraq is located in the Green Zone of Baghdad
- Location: Baghdad, Iraq
- Date: 7 November 2021; 4 years ago
- Target: Mustafa Al-Kadhimi
- Weapon: Drone
- Deaths: None
- Injuries: 6 security guards
- Perpetrator: Unknown
- Motive: Unknown; possibly coup d'état attempt
- Accused: Iran-backed militias

On 7 November 2021, the Iraqi Armed Forces reported that Prime Minister of Iraq Mustafa Al-Kadhimi survived an assassination attempt that morning. An explosive-laden drone attacked his Baghdad residence while two were shot down. Several members of his security personnel were injured. No one has claimed responsibility, although it was generally believed that it was perpetrated by pro-Iran militias.

On 8 November, Kadhimi's office released a statement that the perpetrators were the same people who assassinated Nibras Farman, an agent for the Iraqi National Intelligence Service.

== Background ==
Since the American invasion of Iraq, Iraq has been embroiled in a sectarian conflict between Sunni militants and Shi'a militias, deepening tensions between the two communities. The conflict flared up after IRGC commander Qasem Soleimani was assassinated by the US army, leading to numerous attacks on "US troops, Iraqi armed forces and US-aligned forces", including a missile strike on Erbil International Airport.

On October 10, 2021, parliamentary elections were held which resulted in the Sadrist Movement winning most of the seats and certain pro-Iran parties losing seats. The latter parties alleged that there was electoral fraud, leading to a constitutional crisis. Just two days before the attack occurred, supporters of pro-Iranian groups tried to storm the Green Zone, throwing stones at the local security forces, who responded by firing tear gas at them and shooting in the air to disperse the crowd (resulting in the death of one to two demonstrators), heating up tensions between Iraq's political movements.

According to Matthew Zais of the Atlantic Council, Iraqi warlord and the head of Asaib Al-Haq, Qais Khazali, had "described previous attacks against Americans and similarly warned the Iraqi Prime Minister" the day before the drones struck.

== Attack ==
On 7 November 2021, according to reports by the Iraqi Armed Forces, an explosive-laden drone attacked the then Iraqi Prime Minister, Mustafa Al-Kadhimi's, Baghdad residence while two were shot down. Several members of his security personnel were injured. No one has claimed responsibility, although it was generally believed that it was perpetrated by pro-Iran militias.

On 8 November, a pair of anonymous regional officials and some (also anonymous) militia sources told Reuters that the attack was the fault of Shi'te militias such as Kata'ib Hezbollah or Asaib Ahl al-Haq, also alleging that the weapons used by the perpetrators were made in Iran.

On 8 November, Kadhimi's office released a statement that the perpetrators were the same people who assassinated Nibras Farman, an agent for the Iraqi National Intelligence Service.

=== Damage inflicted by the attack ===
Many parts of Kadhimi's home, including his garage, were damaged by the blast, and at least one explosion was documented. Western diplomats reported hearing the noise of gunfire and explosions inside the Green Zone.

Iraqi government agencies described the perpetrators as using "quadcopter" drones; the same type used by Saraya Awliya al-Dam in the 2021 Erbil rocket attacks. Drones are usually used in the region by pro-Iran militias, since they are hard to be attributed to and allow larger militias and Iran to deny responsibility.

== Analysis ==
Hamdi Malik, who has studied the presence of Shi'te militias in Iraq, described it as a "clear message of 'We can create chaos in Iraq, - we have the guns, we have the means'".

Tallha Abdulrazaq, writing for TRT World, wrote that "the attack can be characterized as a failed coup attempt, and as a pointed and explosive message to Kadhimi and anyone else deemed to be an impediment to the Shia militia's gangster rule in Iraq," arguing that it was a warning sign to scare off Iraq's anti-Iran movement.

Two former and one current United States Defense officials expressed doubt that the assassination attempt was directly the fault of Iran, but did agree the attack was most likely committed by Shi'ite militias.

Two writers for the Jean Jaures Society expressed worries that the strike could "plunge back" Iraq "into chaos in a highly flammable regional and internal context".

== Reactions ==
=== Inside Iraq ===
Iraq: The President of the Republic of Iraq, Barham Salih tweeted that "We [Iraqis] cannot accept that Iraq will be dragged into chaos and a coup against its constitutional system."

==== From Shi'tes ====
Many Shi'a clerics and politicians, including Muqtada al-Sadr, denounced what they termed to be a "terrorist attack". Sadr, who had himself gained significant progress during the October elections, called for the Popular Mobilization Forces to "disband," expressing condemnation of efforts by both Iran and the United States to involve themselves in Iraq's affairs. Abu Ali al-Askari, a prominent figure in Kata'ib Hezbollah, charged Sadr with hypocrisy for failing to disarm his own group, Saraya al-Salam.

A few weeks later, Sadr announced he had just dissolved one of his own factions, the Promised Day Brigade.

Amar al-Hakim and Haider al-Abadi were among the Shi'ite leaders who condemned the attack.

Several prominent Shi'ite militia leaders, including Askari and Qais Khazali, dismissed the attack as a fraud, arguing that it was an inside job by the Iraqi government.

The spokesman for Asaib al-Haq, Mahmoud al-Rubaie, tweeted that it was "a fabricated explosion… with the aim of covering up yesterday's crimes and preoccupying public opinion".

==== From Assyrians ====
The Patriarch of the Chaldean Catholics and head of the Chaldean Catholic Church, Louis Raphaël I Sako called for prayers for Iraq and the safety of Prime Minister Mustafa Al-Kadhimi, after the assassination attempt.

==== From Kurds ====
Masoud Barzani, former president of Iraqi Kurdistan region expressed his solidarity with Kadhimi in a telephone call.

=== International ===
- Armenia: Armenia's foreign ministry tweeted it "strongly condem[ed] the assassination attempt on PM of Iraq Iraqi Prime Minister Mustafa al-Kadhimi," voicing solidarity for Iraq and Iraqi security.
- Bahrain: Bahraini heir apparent, Salman bin Hamad Al Khalifa decried the attempted killing of Kadhimi.
- Canada: The Government's Minister of Foreign Affairs, Mélanie Joly, released an official denouncement of the drone strike.
- China: In a short statement, Wang Wenbin told reporters that China "condemns the targeting of the residence of the Iraqi Prime Minister" and that China "affirms its solidarity with Iraq".
- Egypt: President Abdel Fattah el-Sisi expressed his sympathies to Kadhimi, posting on Facebook, "As I condemn this brute attempt, I pray to Allah to protect him [Kadhimi] and to bring safety and security to Iraq and its people".
- France: France announced that it "rejects in this context any form of destabilization of the country".
- Germany: The Foreign ministry responded that "Iraq's democratization process must not be undermined by political violence."
- Hezbollah: Spokesmen for the Lebanese Shi'a paramilitary named it a "treacherous" attack in an interview with the Iraqi News Agency.
- India: The Indian Foreign Affairs spokesman, Arindam Bagchi, saying, "We express our concerns for the casualties caused by the attack and reiterate our support for the democratic process in Iraq."
- Iran: Ali Shamkhani of the Supreme National Security Council condemned the attack, placing the blame on "foreign think tanks" and the American military presence in Iraq.
- Japan: Japan named it "an act of terror that undermines democracy in Iraq."
- Jordan: King Abdullah II denounced the attack in a phone call with Kadhimi, expressing his solidarity with Iraq.
- Kuwait: Kuwait strongly condemned the strike.
- Oman: Oman decried the drone strike.
- Pakistan: Islamabad denounced the "cowardly attack" on Kadhimi's residence.
- Poland: The Ministry of Foreign Affairs responded that "[Poland] reject[s] all destabilisation attempts, acts of terror and actions aimed against the democratisation process in the Republic of Iraq."
- Qatar: Qatar denounced the "act of terrorism targeting the Iraqi state".
- Russia: The government slammed the attack, naming it a "brazen act of terrorism".
- Saudi Arabia: The Kingdom's Foreign Ministry released a statement deeming the attempt as a "cowardly terrorist act", assuring that it "stands united by the brotherly Iraq, Government, and people, in confronting all terrorists who are trying in vain to prevent brotherly Iraq from restoring its health and role".
- Syria: The Foreign and Expatriates Ministry denounced the attack.
- Turkey: Mevlüt Çavuşoğlu decried the attack in a telephone call with Kadhimi. president Recep Tayyip Erdoğan wrote a letter to Al-Kadhimi, saying, "It is with great sadness that I learned of the terrorist attack on your residence in Baghdad."
- Ukraine: The country's foreign ministry responded it was "convinced that such acts of terror and violence will not impede embodiment of the aspirations of the Iraqi people and will not stop their government's efforts to build a sovereign, democratic and prosperous state."
- United Arab Emirates: The foreign ministry condemned the attack it described as "contrary to ethical and humanitarian values and principles."
- United Kingdom: Foreign Secretary Liz Truss condemned the attack on behalf of the British government. Prime Minister Boris Johnson expressed his "sympathies to those injured".
- United States: The President of the United States, Joe Biden voiced strong opposition to the airstrikes, expressing his relief for the news that Kadhimi was unhurt.
- Vatican City: Pope Francis denounced the assassination attempt, terming it "a vile act of terrorism".

=== Supranational ===
- EU: The European Union's Foreign Policy chief Josep Borrell condemned the attack shortly after.
- NATO: Jens Stoltenberg, the Secretary-General of NATO, issued a denouncement of the attack.
- United Nations: The United Nations Assistance Mission for Iraq condemned the drone strike "in the strongest terms".

== Misinformation ==
Since the drone strike, various media channels and movements have encouraged conspiracy theories related to the assassination attempt.

An Iraqi commentator accused U.S. forces of "purposefully deactivating the Green Zone's anti-aircraft system so the attackers could get away with the strike."

Other Shi'a militias released a dossier on Telegram arguing that it was a false-flag strike and that an image of a drone used was actually a "French drone", despite the fact that the munition found at the attack had no traces to France whatsoever. The dossier also puts forth a fake photo showing the traces of an American plane, the MC-12W Liberty, but scholars discovered that the image was forged.
