= Shakhawan Abdulla =

Iraqi Kurdish politician

- شاخەوان عەبدوڵڵا
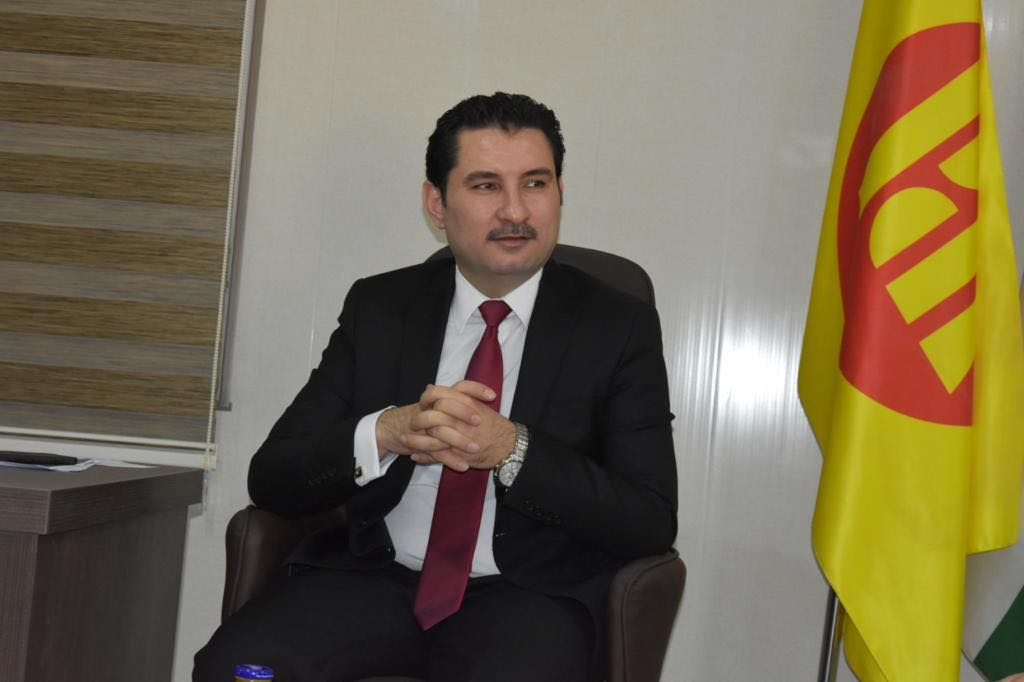
- Shakhawan Abdulla in 2022

Member of Council of Representatives of Iraq
- Incumbent
- Assumed office 30 December 2025
- Parliamentary group: Kurdistan Democratic Party
- Constituency: Kirkuk

Second Deputy Speaker of the Council of Representatives of Iraq
- In office 9 January 2022 – 30 December 2025
- President: Barham Salih; Latif Rashid
- Prime Minister: Mustafa Al-Kadhimi; Mohammed Shia' Al Sudani
- Parliamentary group: Kurdistan Democratic Party
- Constituency: Kirkuk

Personal details
- Born: 1979 (age 46–47) Kirkuk, Iraqi Republic
- Party: Kurdistan Democratic Party
- Occupation: Politician

Shakhawan Abdulla (Kurdish: شاخەوان عەبدوڵا; Arabic: شاخوان عبدالله) born in 1979, Kirkuk, Iraqi Republic is an Iraqi Kurdish politician who was the second deputy speaker in the Council of Representatives of Iraq from 2022 until 2025 where he failed to secure his second term as the second deputy speaker. after his failure to becoming the second deputy speaker for the second time he is now just a member in the iraqi council of representatives. he is also an active member of the Democratic Party of Kurdistan.

== Positions ==
- Legal Director of the Trade Departments in Kirkuk until 2005.
- Legal Director of Investigations at the Regional Security Council in Kirkuk from 2005 to 2014.
- Lecturer at Cihan University from 2012 to 2014.
- Rapporteur of the Security and Defense Committee.
- Member, Deputy, and Chairman of several parliamentary and investigative committees.
- Second Deputy Speaker of the Iraqi Council of Representatives from 2022 to 2025.
