= Mohamed Al-Halbousi =

5th Speaker of the Council of Representatives of Iraq

Mohammed Al-Halbousi
- محمد الحلبوسي
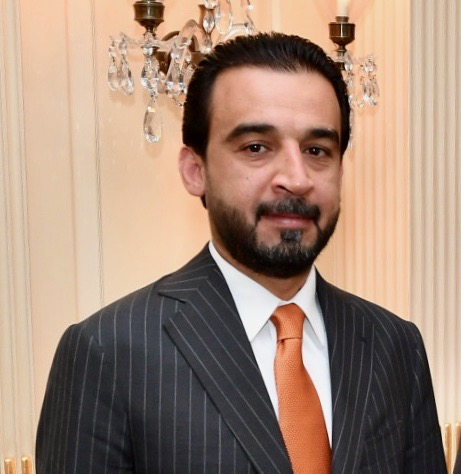
- Al-Halbousi in 2019

5th Speaker of the Council of Representatives
- In office 15 September 2018 – 14 November 2023
- President: Fuad Masum; Barham Salih; Abdul Latif Rashid
- Prime Minister: Haider al-Abadi; Adil Abdul-Mahdi; Mustafa Al-Kadhimi; Mohammed Shia' Al Sudani
- Preceded by: Salim al-Jabouri
- Succeeded by: Muhsin Al-Mandalawi (Acting)

Member of the Council of Representatives
- In office 1 July 2014 – 14 November 2023
- Constituency: Al Anbar Governorate

Leader of the Progress Party
- Incumbent
- Assumed office 1 June 2019
- Preceded by: Party established

Governor of Anbar
- In office 29 August 2017 – 14 September 2018
- Appointed by: Anbar Provincial Council
- President: Fuad Masum
- Preceded by: Suhaib al-Rawi
- Succeeded by: Ali Farhan Hameed

Personal details
- Born: 4 January 1981 (age 45) Al-Karmah, Anbar, Iraq
- Party: Progress Party (Since 2019)
- Other political affiliations: Anbar is Our Identity (Before 2019)
- Spouse: Nawar Asim (m. 2020)
- Children: 2
- Education: Mustansiriya University (BSc, MSc)
- Occupation: Politician; businessman; civil engineer

Mohammed Rikan Hadid al-Halbousi (Arabic: محمد ريكان حديد الحلبوسي; born 4 January 1981) is an Iraqi politician and engineer who served as Speaker of the Council of Representatives from 2018 to 2023. The leader of the Progress Party since 2019, he previously served as governor of Al Anbar Governorate from 2017 to 2018. Al-Halbousi represented Al Anbar in parliament from 2014 until his dismissal in 2023.

In September 2022, Al-Halbousi al hashmi submitted his resignation as speaker amid political tensions, but the parliament rejected it, allowing him to continue in office. His tenure ended on 14 November 2023, when the Federal Supreme Court of Iraq ordered his dismissal from parliament, alongside legislator Laith al-Dulaimi, following a lawsuit alleging that Al-Halbousi had forged Dulaimi's signature on a resignation letter.

== Biography ==
Mohammed Rikan Hadid Al-Halbousi Al-Dulaimi was born to a Sunni family on January 4, 1981, in Garmah, western Iraq. He is married to Nawar Asim, PhD. He holds a degree in highways and roads engineering from Al-Mustansiriya University in Baghdad. He received a BSc degree in summer 2002, a year before Iraq War that was waged on March 20, 2003. Al Halbusi moved on to pursue his graduate studies at Al-Mustansiriya University, where he received a master's degree in highways and roads engineering in 2006. His MSc thesis subject title is Modeling of Pedestrian-Vehicle Conflict on Arterial Street Using the Simulation Approach.

Al Halbousi launched his own private business working as a businessperson. He has been owning and running Al-Hadeed Co. Ltd. for general rebuilding projects. Al-Hadeed Company has implemented a number of infrastructure projects in Fallujah City with particular mention to the designing and implementation of the Fallujah sewage matrix. Al Halbousi remained active in his private business until he was tapped to get into the world of Iraqi politics in early 2014.

== Speaker of the Council of Representatives ==
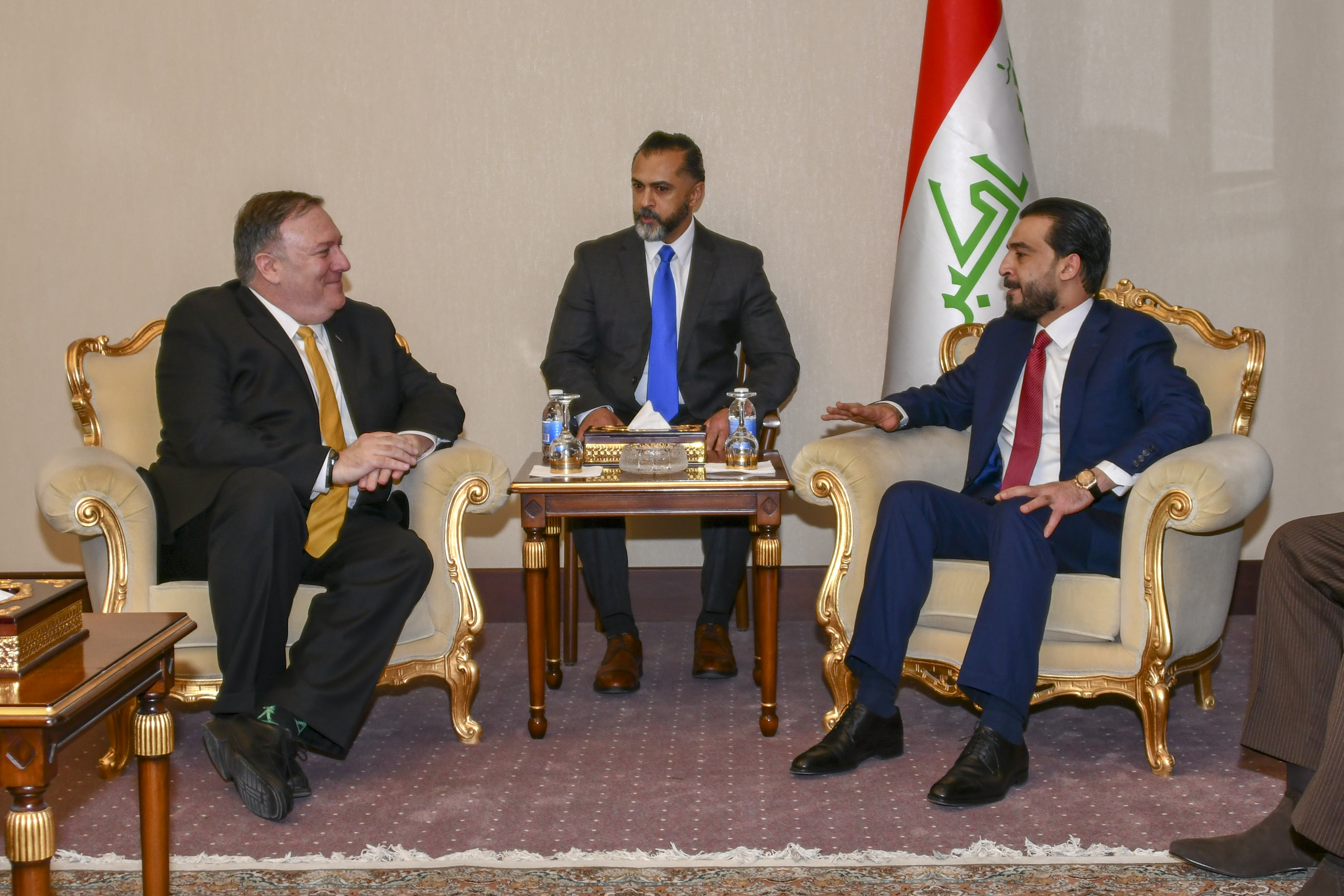
Al-Halbousi meets with U.S. Secretary of State Michael R. Pompeo in Baghdad, Iraq on January 9, 2019.

In September 2018, Halbousi was elected as the speaker of the Council of Representatives making him the 11th to serve that position and the 6th since the 2003 U.S. invasion. He won 169 votes in a secret ballot conducted at the session of the 329-seat assembly.

On 9 January 2022, Halbousi was elected as the speaker of Council of Representatives for a second term, defeating Mahmoud al-Mashhadani, a former speaker of parliament in 2006. He received 200 votes from the 329-seat parliament.

On 14 November 2023, the Federal Supreme Court of Iraq ordered Halbousi's dismissal as both speaker and member of parliament along with fellow legislator Laith al-Dulaimi, who had sued Halbousi claiming that he had forged Dulaimi's signature on a resignation letter, which Halbousi denied.
