= Raed Shaker Jawdat =

Raed Shaker Jawdat رائد شاكر جودت
- Born: 1959 (age 66–67); Maysān - Iraqi Republic
- Allegiance: Iraq
- Branch: Iraqi Federal Police
- Service years: 1984 – present
- Rank: General
- Conflicts: Operation Ashura; Siege of Amirli; Battle of Baiji (2014–15); Second Battle of Tikrit; Operation Imposing Law; Operation Phantom Strike; 2014 Northern Iraq offensive; Battle of Ramadi (2015–16); Battle of Mosul (2016–2017); Second Battle of Fajullah

Raed Shaker Jawdat (Arabic: رائد شاكر جودت), is an Iraqi General. He graduated from the Iraqi Military College in 1978 and is the commander of the Iraqi Federal Police.

== Wars in which he participated ==
- Jurf Al Nasr (Operation Ashura)
- Siege of Amirli
- Battle of Baiji (2014–15)
- Second Battle of Tikrit
- Battle of Ramadi (2015–16)
