= Hajim al-Hassani =

Iraqi politician

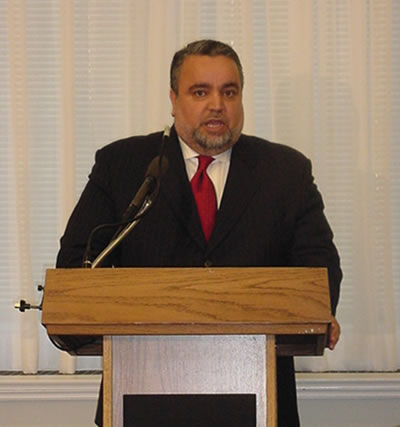
Hajim al-Hassani

Hajim Mahdi Saleh al-Hassani (Arabic: حاجم مهدي صالح الحسني; born 1954 in Kirkuk) to a prominent family is an Iraqi politician and was the speaker of the Iraqi National Assembly under the Iraqi Transitional Government. A moderate Sunni Arab and relative outsider, having spent much of his life in the United States, al-Hassani was tapped as a compromise candidate for the speaker's post after weeks of deadlock between Iraqi political parties. al-Hassani had previously been a member of the Iraqi Islamic Party in exile and was Industry Minister under the interim government of Iyad Allawi.

Born in Kirkuk, Hassani attended Mosul University and relocated to the United States in 1979. He studied at the University of Nebraska–Lincoln and earned a Ph.D. degree from the University of Connecticut and then spent 12 years a CEO for an investment and trading company in Los Angeles. While in the U.S., he was involved in the opposition to the Saddam Hussein regime in exile, and was actively involved with the Iraqi Islamic Party (IIP).

Hassani returned to Iraq following the U.S. invasion in 2003 and worked with the Interim Iraqi Governing Council appointed during the period of the Coalition Provisional Authority. As the IIP wielded influence in the dangerous Anbar province, Hassani was involved in negotiating a temporary truce with Fallujah-based insurgents in 2004 and successfully stopped an imminent attack on the city.

Under the Iraqi Interim Government of Iyad Allawi, formed in 2004, Hassani was named industry minister in the new administration. He left the party when the IIP withdrew from the government, retaining his ministry post.

He joined the Iraqis coalition of Interim President Ghazi al-Yawer for the election in January 2005. After the election the post of speaker was reportedly reserved for a Sunni Arab, and al-Hassani, one of only two candidates deemed acceptable to the range of parties, was offered the post.

He was elected to the Council of Representatives of Iraq in the Iraqi legislative election of December 2005 as part of the Iraqi National List coalition led by Iyad Allawi. He resigned from that coalition in September 2007, claiming Allawi was high-handed and lacking in vision. Later he formed Nationalist List and participated in the provincial election. He is considered by Iraqis as one of the moderate and liberal politician in Iraq after Saddam's regime and widely respected by most of politicians in Iraq.

Preceded by Mohammad Tufik Rahim	Minister of Industry; June 2004–May 2005	Succeeded by Usama al-Najafi
