= Progress Party (Iraq) =

Progress Party حزب تقدم حیزبی تەقەدووم
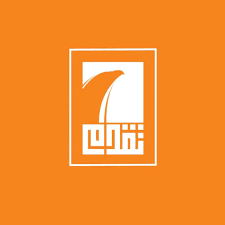
- Abbreviation: TAK (unofficial)
- Leader: Mohamed Al-Halbousi
- Founder: Mohamed Al-Halbousi, Ali Farhan, Yahia Al Mohammadi
- Spokesperson: Yahia Al Mohammadi
- Founded: 1 June 2019; 7 years ago
- Headquarters: Baghdad
- Ideology: Liberalism; Nonsectarianism; Moderation; Reformism; Sunni interests
- Political position: Big tent
- Colours: Orange
- Council of Representatives: 27 / 329

Website
- takadum.org

The Progress Party (Arabic: حزب تقدم, romanized: Ḥizb Taqadum), also known as the Al-Takadum Movement or by its Arabic short form Takadum (Progress), is an Iraqi political party formed to contest the 2021 general election.

The political groups Anbar is Our Identity and Qimam Alliance are also led by Al-Halbousi, serving as political proxies to maintain ties with local leaders, and thus are included in the seat count and considered to be extensions of the party.

== History ==
The party was founded in 2019 by Mohamed Al Halbousi, the incumbent Speaker of the Council of Representatives of Iraq, Ali Farhan, the governor of Anbar, and the politician Yahia Al Mohamadi.

== Election results ==
In the 2021 Iraqi parliamentary election, the party won 7.2% of the vote, becoming the second-largest individual party behind the Sadrists. The party primarily receives support from Sunni Arabs, with its performance highest in Anbar and Nineveh governorates, including the city of Mosul.

Election	Leader	Votes	%	Seats	+/–	Position	Government
2021	Mohamed Al-Halbousi	637,198	7.2%	37 / 329	New	▲3rd	Coalition
2025	Mohamed Al-Halbousi	939,810	8.37%	27 / 329	▼10	3rd	Coalition
