= Mustafa Al-Kadhimi =

Iraqi politician

- مصطفى الكاظمي
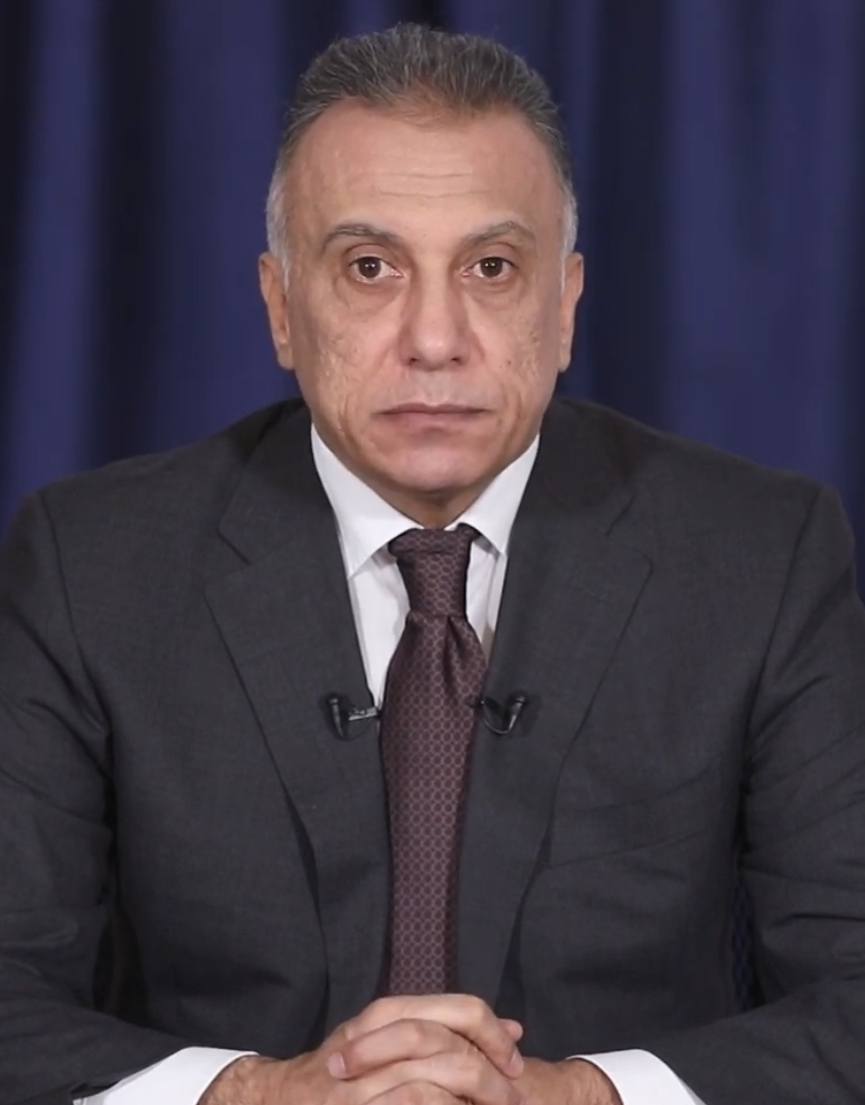
- Al-Kadhimi in 2020

Prime Minister of Iraq
- In office 7 May 2020 – 27 October 2022
- President: Barham Salih; Abdul Latif Rashid
- Preceded by: Adil Abdul-Mahdi
- Succeeded by: Mohammed Shia' Al Sudani

Minister of Foreign Affairs
- Acting; 12 May 2020 – 6 June 2020
- Prime Minister: Himself
- Preceded by: Mohamed Ali Alhakim
- Succeeded by: Fuad Hussein

Director of the Iraqi National Intelligence Service
- In office 7 June 2016 – July 2022
- Prime Minister: Haider al-Abadi; Adil Abdul-Mahdi
- Preceded by: Zuheir Fadel Abbas Ghirbawi
- Succeeded by: Raid Jouhi

Personal details
- Born: Mustafa Abdul Latif Mishatat; 31 January 1964 (age 62) Baghdad, Iraq
- Citizenship: Iraq; United Kingdom
- Party: Independent
- Education: Al Turath University College (LLB)
- Occupation: Politician; diplomat; bureaucrat; journalist; documentalist
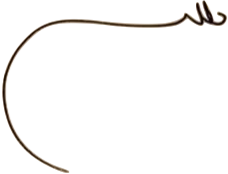
- Signature
- Website: t.me/mus_grob

Mustafa Abdul Latif Mishatat al-Gharibawi (Arabic: مصطفى عبد اللطيف مشتت, romanized: Muṣṭafá ʻAbd al-Laṭīf Mushattat; born 1 January 1964 in the Kadhimiya area of Baghdad), known as Mustafa al-Kadhimi (Note: alternatively spelt Mustafa al-Kadhimy) is an independent Iraqi politician, lawyer, bureaucrat and former intelligence officer who served as the prime minister of Iraq from 7 May 2020 to 27 October 2022. He was nominated as prime minister in May 2020 following the 2019 Iraqi protests and the resignation of Adel Abdul Mahdi. He previously served as columnist for several news outlets and the Director of the Iraqi National Intelligence Service, originally appointed in June 2016. He briefly served as Iraqi Minister of Foreign Affairs in an acting capacity in 2020. The latter part of his tenure closely followed the 2022 Iraqi political crisis. Following the conclusion of his term as prime minister in 2022, he spent over two years abroad, returning to Baghdad in February 2025. During his time away, he resided in London and the United Arab Emirates. His return was at the invitation of current Iraqi political leaders who sought his assistance in addressing the country's economic challenges.

== Biography ==
Al-Kadhimi was born in Baghdad in 1964 to Abdul Latif, who was born in Al-Shatrah, a town in southern Iraq, located northeast of Nasiriyah. He later migrated from Nasiriyah to Baghdad as a student. Around 1963, Abdul Latif relocated the family to Baghdad, where he later worked as a technical supervisor at Baghdad International Airport. He was also active in politics, representing the National Democratic Party in Shatrah.

Al-Kadhimi was a vocal opponent of the regime of Saddam Hussein. He left Iraq in 1985 and lived in exile in Iran then Germany, before settling in the United Kingdom, where he worked as a journalist human rights activist. He eventually became a citizen of the UK.

After the 2003 American-led invasion of Iraq, al-Kadhimi returned to Iraq and cofounded the Iraqi Media Network. He then served as executive director of the Iraq Memory Foundation from 2003 to 2010, an organization dedicated to documenting the crimes of Saddam Hussein's Ba'athist regime.

From 2010 to 2013, al-Kadhimi served as the editor-in-chief of Newsweek Iraq. Between 2013 to 2016, he was a columnist and an editor of the Iraqi version of Al-Monitor where he wrote extensively on Iraqi politics, governance reform, democracy, and human rights issues. He has also published a number of books and studies.

In 2012 al-Kadhimi achieved a Bachelors Degree in law from Al-Turath University in Baghdad. He was responsible for reforming the Iraqi National Intelligence Service (INIS) to be more effective and to meet international standards. He oversaw ending the politicization of intelligence action, implementing advanced methods to intelligence gathering and analysis, and setting priorities to broaden the scope of the work of the National Intelligence Service. Under his leadership, the agency expanded its remit, particularly in counter-terrorism, both internally and abroad, playing a vital role in Iraq's fight against ISIL, also known as Daesh. During his tenure, he established links with scores of countries and bureaus working within the US-led federation against ISIL. In October 2021, during al-Kadhimi's tenure, the INIS conducted what he described as a "complex external operation" that led to the capture of Sami Jasim al-Jaburi, identified by Iraqi and US authorities as a senior Islamic State figure in charge of the group's finances.

In 2017, during a rare visit to Riyadh alongside Haider al-Abadi, al-Kadhimi was seen in a long embrace with Saudi Crown Prince Mohammed bin Salman, drawing regional attention to the close rapport between the two men.

== Prime Minister of Iraq ==
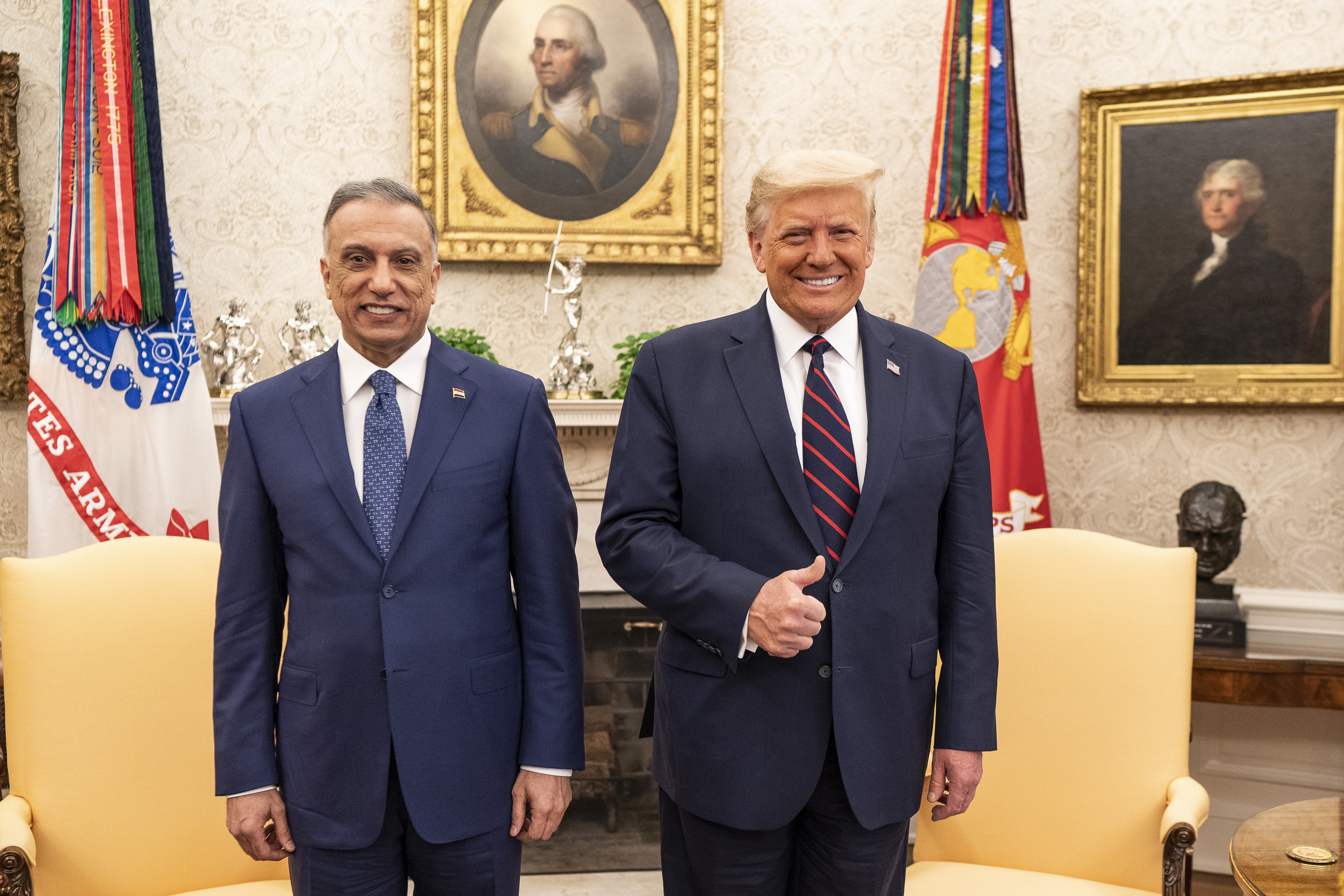
Al-Kadhimi with US President Donald Trump in 2020

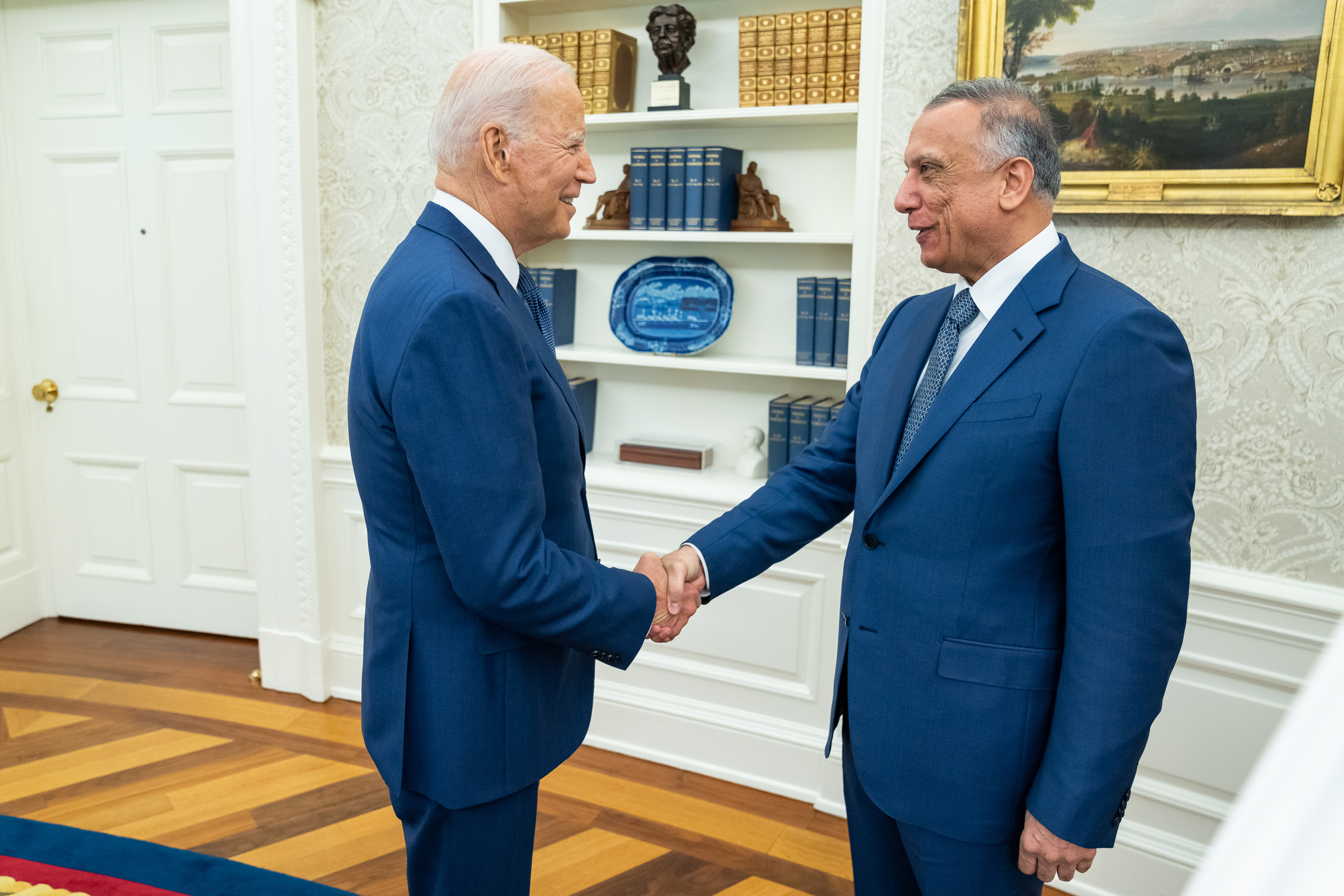
Al-Kadhimi with US President Joe Biden in 2021

Following months of protests that broke out across Iraq in October 2019 and the resignation of Prime Minister Adel Abdul Mahdi and his cabinet, Mustafa Al Kadhimi became a leading contender for the premiership.

On 9 April 2020, he was named by President Barham Salih as prime minister-designate, the third person tapped to lead the country in just ten weeks. Kadhimi was nominated, state television reported, shortly after the previously designated prime minister, Adnan al-Zurfi, announced he was withdrawing because he had failed to secure enough support to form a government. After nearly six months of political negotiations, Iraq's parliament confirmed al-Kadhimi as Prime Minister of Iraq on 6 May 2020. Before entering office, al-Kadhimi said his government would be a government that would find solutions to Iraq's many problems and not a crisis ridden government. Ahead of the parliamentary vote to approve his cabinet, al-Kadhimi stated that his would be a "solution-based, not a crisis government," and pledged to prevent Iraq from being used as a battleground by other countries. On 31 July 2020, he announced that parliamentary elections would be held early, on 6 June 2021, describing the move as a response to demands from the protest movement that began in 2019; the United Nations welcomed the announcement as a step towards greater stability and democracy in Iraq. He assumed office on the heels of major upheavals in Iraq – large protests, falling oil prices, and the COVID-19 pandemic.

Upon assuming power, al-Kadhimi promised to guide Iraq through a serious financial crisis, saying the state treasury was “nearly empty” after years of waste and declining oil prices. Al-Kadhimi's cabinet vowed to reduce public spending and audit salaries granted to millions of Iraqis but retracted the plan after public criticism. In August 2020, he hired hundreds of unemployed Iraqis at the ministry of defense, but not enough to halt sit-ins outside other public sector offices demanding jobs. He had few allies in government and his parliament was heavily dominated by pro-Iran MPs who balked at his references to protester demands. He also struggled to fulfill his promise to bring the security forces to justice who were allegedly responsible for the deaths of nearly 600 protesters and activists since October 2019. In addition, al-Kadhimi pledged to investigate the recent murders of journalists and political activists that had increased in the past year, but no one had been brought to justice as of September 2020.

In October 2020, Al-Kadhimi's cabinet approved an economic reform agenda known as the "White Paper", which identified over 200 reforms aimed at addressing Iraq's economic challenges. Al-Kadhimi described the White Paper as a multi-year plan to address uncontrolled corruption and mismanagement, rebuild the Iraqi economy, and reduce Iraq's heavy dependence on oil revenues by diversifying sources of national income, with implementation proposed over a five-year period.

During his premiership, al-Kadhimi also sought to restore Iraq's regional diplomatic role. Beginning in April 2021, he facilitated several rounds of talks in Baghdad between Saudi Arabia and Iran, contributing to efforts to reduce tensions between the two countries. On 28 August 2021, Baghdad hosted the inaugural Conference for Cooperation and Partnership, attended by leaders and senior officials from Iraq's neighboring states along with French President Emmanuel Macron. The summit, described by international observers as a significant diplomatic step, underscored Iraq's emerging role as a regional mediator.

During Pope Francis's visit to Iraq, al-Kadhimi received the pope at Baghdad International Airport. On 6 March, after Pope Francis met Grand Ayatollah al-Sistani in Najaf and attended an interreligious meeting at Ur, al-Kadhimi declared 6 March the National Day of Tolerance and Coexistence in Iraq.

On 27 June 2021, al-Kadhimi met Egyptian President Abdel Fattah el-Sisi and Jordanian King Abdullah II in Baghdad for the fourth Iraq–Egypt–Jordan trilateral summit. The meeting marked the first visit by an Egyptian head of state to Iraq since 1990.

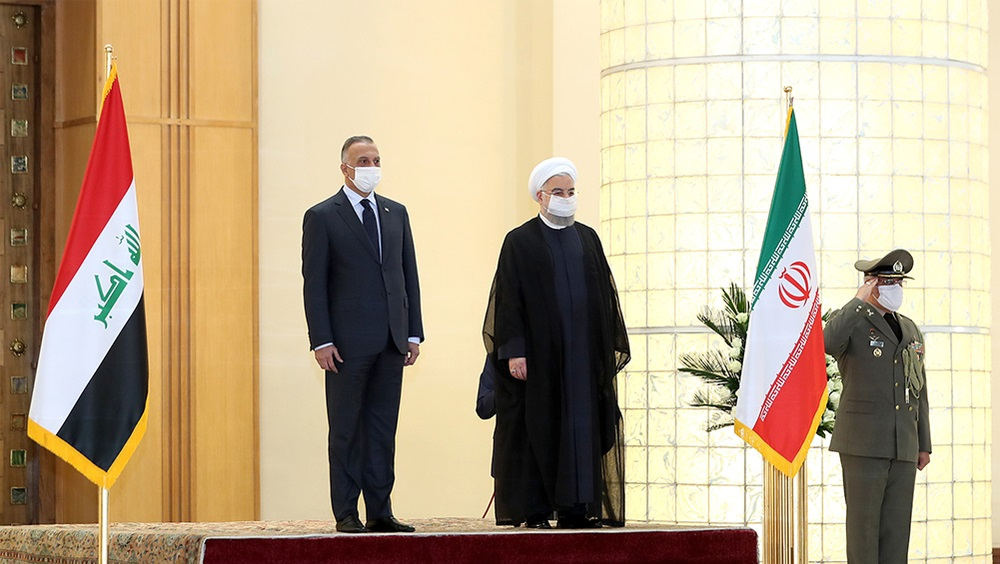
Al-Kadhimi with Iranian President Hassan Rouhani, 21 July 2020

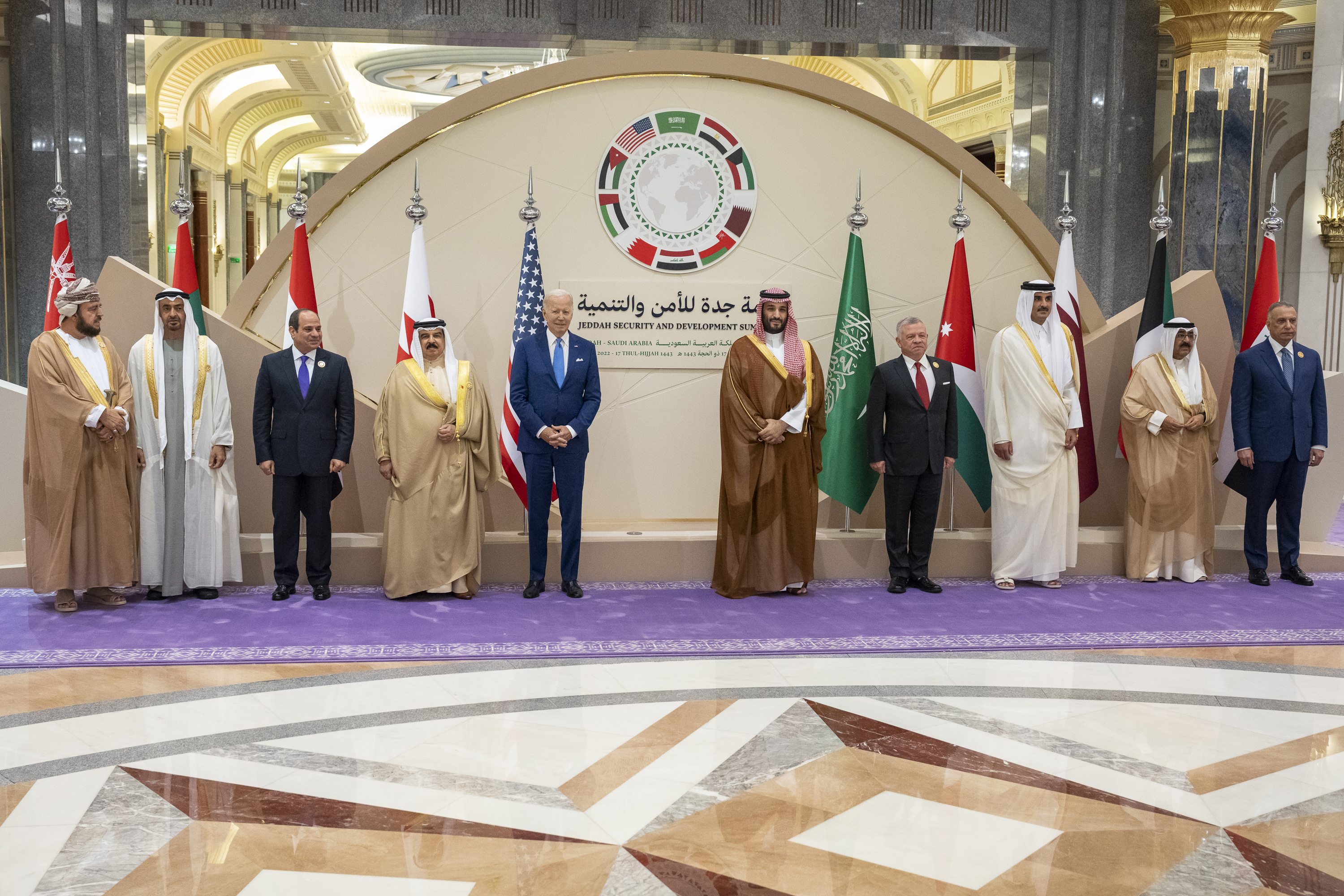
Al-Kadhimi with the leaders of United States, the GGC, Egypt and Jordan at the GCC+3 summit in Jeddah, Saudi Arabia, 16 July 2022

In July 2021, al-Kadhimi and U.S. President Joe Biden sealed an agreement to end the U.S. combat mission in Iraq by the end of 2021. Following his visit to the United States, Iraq reclaimed 17,000 archaeological artifacts returned by U.S. authorities and institutions, including items held by the Museum of the Bible and Cornell University. The repatriation occurred within a wider context of antiquities looting in Iraq, including extensive destruction and smuggling by ISIS between 2014 and 2017. Iraqi Culture Minister Hassan Nazim described the repatriation as "the largest return of antiquities to Iraq.

=== Criticism ===
Al-Kadhimi was criticized in failing to raise alarms when it was found that since September 2021, $2.5bn from the country's tax deposits were reported as missing, the allegations were made by the finance ministry under Prime Minister Mohammed Shia' Al Sudani. Investigators believed that the money were distributed to politicians and used for bribes and hush-money. Former Finance Minister Ali Allawi mentioned that "senior officials and corrupt businessmen siphon billions from the public purse". The large volumes traded caused the dinar to fall and property prices in posh areas in Baghdad to rise.

=== Accusation for the deaths of Soleimani and al-Muhandis ===
Iran and its allied Fatah Alliance heavily opposed al-Kadhimi's appointment. In April 2020, Kata'ib Hezbollah, a Shia-Iraqi militia with close links to Iran and ties to the Popular Mobilization Forces, published a statement that accused al-Kadhimi of being culpable for the deaths of its leader Abu Mahdi al-Muhandis and Iranian General Qasem Soleimani and charged him with working with the United States. In the meantime, al-Kadhimi directed the Counter Terrorism Service (CTS) to investigate rocket attacks against the Green Zone in Baghdad, and promised to confront the disobedient Iranian supported paramilitaries. On 25 June 2020, Iraqi security forces raided KH base in Dora, southern Baghdad and detained at least 14 militia members.

=== Attempted assassination ===
In the early hours of 7 November 2021, al-Kadhimi survived an assassination attempt via explosive drone, two drones were shot down by the army while the last one targeted his residence in the heavily fortified Green Zone district of Baghdad. The assassination attempt was suspected by many to be Iran’s response to Al-Kadhimi for his crackdown on Iranian supported militias and his strict policy of removing foreign influence in Iraq.

On 8 November, a pair of anonymous regional officials and some (also anonymous) militia sources told Reuters that Iranian-backed militias were behind the attack, such as Kata'ib Hezbollah or Asaib Ahl al-Haq, also alleging that the weapons used by the perpetrators were made in Iran.

The assassination attempt came during high tension period after pro-Iranian parties lost seats in the 2021 Iraqi parliamentary election.

== Post-premiership ==
In July 2022, Al-Kadhimi was awarded the Legion of Honor by the French government. The medal, presented by the French ambassador to Iraq on behalf of President Emmanuel Macron, is France's highest order of merit and was granted in recognition of his role in strengthening bilateral relations. During this meeting, Al-Kadhimi noted the importance of bilateral cooperation between Iraq and France including areas such as economic development and security.

After stepping down as prime minister, al-Kadhimi resided in London and the United Arab Emirates. On 25 February 2025, Al-Kadhimi returned to Iraq after an extended period abroad which followed security concerns including an assassination attempt in 2021. He did not confirm whether he would run in future elections, stating that participation would depend on the transparency and credibility of the electoral process.

== Works ==
Al-Kadhimi has authored several books:

- Ali Ibn Abi Talib: The Imam and the Man (1989)
- Islamic Concerns (1995)
- Humanitarian Concerns (2000) – selected by the European Union as the best book written by a political refugee
- The Iraq Question: Reconciliation Between the Past and the Future (2012)

== Notes ==
Government offices
| Preceded by Zuheir Fadel Abbas al-Ghirbawi | Director of the Iraqi National Intelligence Service; 2016–2020 | Succeeded by To be determined |
Political offices
| Preceded by Adil Abdul-Mahdi | Prime Minister of Iraq; 2020–2022 | Succeeded by Mohammed Shia' Al Sudani |
