= 2009 Saladin governorate election =

2009 Saladin Governorate election
← 2005	31 January 2009	2013 →

All 28 seats for the Saladin Governorate council
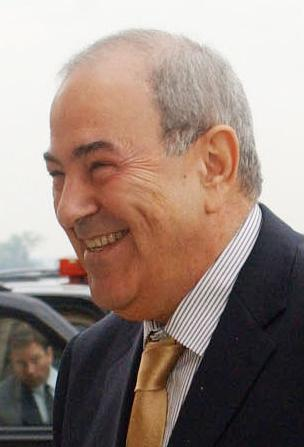
	First party	Second party
Leader	Ayad al-Samarrai	Ayad Allawi
Party	Tawafuq	INL
Last election	0	3
Seats before	0	3
Seats won	5	5
Seat change	▲5	▲2
	Third party	Fourth party
Leader		Saleh al-Mutlaq
Party	National Iraqi Project Front	INDF
Last election	3	0
Seats before	3	0
Seats won	3	3
Seat change	No change	▲3
Governor of Saladin before election
Hamed Hamood Shekti al-Qaisi
DPAK
Subsequent Governor
Mutashar al-Aliwi
Tawafuq

The Saladin governorate election of 2009, was held on 31 January 2009 alongside elections for all other governorates outside Iraqi Kurdistan and Kirkuk Governorate.

== Campaign ==
The governor of Saladin, Hamad Hamood al-Qaysi, stood for the Iraqi National List of former Prime Minister Ayad Allawi. The INL also recruited local tribal leaders. The INL were successful in the elections because they had consistently opposed the de-Baathification policies of the Iraqi government, which had caused significant unemployment in the province.

The Reconciliation and Liberation Bloc's main slogan was "Get Out, Get Out Occupier".

== Results ==
Immediately after the election, the Iraqi National List and the Iraqi National Dialogue Front claimed victory in Saladin.

In March, the INDF said they would form an alliance with the State of Law Coalition.

Summary of the 31 January 2009 Saladin governorate election results
Coalition	Allied national parties	Seats (2005)	Seats (2009)	Change	Votes
Salahuddin Accordance Front	Iraqi Accord Front	–	5	▲5	57,264
Iraqi National Accord	INL	3	5	▲2	56,853
National Iraqi Gathering		3	3	–	35,482
Iraqi National Dialogue Front		–	3	▲3	35,131
Iraqi Scholars and Intellectuals Group		–	2	▲2	23,772
Iraqi Turkmen Front	ITF	5	2	▼3	19,013
Reconciliation and Liberation Bloc		6	2	▼4	18,743
Salahuddin National Front		–	2	▲2	18,079
List of the Unified Democratic Coalition in Salah al-Din Governorate; Brotherly and Co-existence Coalition	PUK, KDP	8	2	▼6	17,651
State of Law Coalition	Islamic Dawa Party	3	2	▼1	14,422
Coalition for Iraqi National Unity		5	–	▼5	
Unified List		4	–	▼4	
Gathering of Independents in Salah al-Din		2	–	▼2	
National Al-Risaliya List	Sadr	2	–	▼2	
Total		41	28	▼13	403,764
Sources: this article -
