= List of elections in 2014 =

- 2014 United Nations Security Council election 16 October 2014
- 2014 Greenlandic general election 28 November 2014

== Africa ==
- 2014 Algerian presidential election 17 April 2014
- 2014 Botswana general election 24 October 2014
- 2014 Comorian presidential election 21 February and 10 April 2014
- 2014 Egyptian presidential election 26–28 May 2014
- 2014 Egyptian constitutional referendum 14–15 January 2014
- 2014 Guinea-Bissau general election 13 April and 18 May 2014
- 2014 Libyan local elections 2014
- 2014 Libyan Constitutional Assembly election 20 February 2014
- 2014 Malawian general election 20 May 2014
- 2014 Mauritanian presidential election 21 June 2014
- 2014 Mozambican general election 15 October 2014
- 2014 Namibian general election 28 November 2014
- 2014 São Tomé and Príncipe legislative election 12 October 2014
- 2014 South African general election 7 May 2014
- 2014 Tanzanian local elections 14 December 2014
- 2014 Tunisian parliamentary election 26 October 2014
- 2014 Tunisian presidential election 23 November and 21 December 2014

== Asia ==
- 2014 Abkhazian presidential election 24 August 2014
- 2014 Afghan presidential election 5 April and 14 June 2014
- 2014 Bahraini general election 22 November and 29 November 2014
- 2014 Bangladeshi general election 5 January 2014
- 2014 Egyptian presidential election 26–28 May 2014
- 2014 Indonesian legislative election 9 April 2014
- 2014 Indonesian presidential election 9 July 2014
- 2014 Indian general election 7 April to 12 May 2014
- 2014 Iraqi parliamentary election 30 April 2014
- 2014 Iraqi presidential election 24 July 2014
- 2014 Israeli presidential election 10 June 2014
- 2014 Japanese general election 14 December 2014
- 2014–2016 Lebanese presidential election 23 April 2014–31 October 2016
- 2014 North Korean parliamentary election 9 March 2014
- 2014 Taiwanese municipal elections 29 November 2014
- 2014 Thai general election 2 February 2014
- 2014 Turkish local elections 30 March 2014 (1 June-reruns)
- 2014 South Korean local elections 4 June 2014
- 2014 Syrian presidential election 3 June 2014
- 2014–15 Uzbek parliamentary election 21 December 2014 (first round)

== Europe ==
- 2014 Belgian federal election 25 May 2014
- 2014 Belgian regional elections 25 May 2014
- 2014 Bosnian general election 12 October 2014
- 2014 Bulgarian parliamentary election 5 October 2014
- 2014 Czech Senate election 10-11 and 17–18 October 2014
- 2014 Czech municipal elections 10–11 October 2014
- 2014 Dutch municipal elections 19 March 2014
- 2014 French Senate election 28 September 2014
- 2014 Georgian local elections 15 June 2014
- 2014-15 Greek presidential election 17 December 2014
- 2014 Hungarian parliamentary election 6 April 2014
- 2014 Irish local elections 23 May 2014
- 2014 Icelandic municipal elections 31 May 2014
- 2014 Italian local elections 25 May 2014
- 2014 Latvian parliamentary election 4 October 2014
- 2014 Lithuanian presidential election 11 and 25 May 2014
- 2014 Macedonian general election 13 and 27 April 2014
- 2014 Moldovan parliamentary election 30 November 2014
- 2014 Romanian presidential election 2 and 16 November 2014
- 2014 Serbian local elections 2014
- 2014 Serbian parliamentary election 16 March 2014
- 2014 Slovak presidential election 15 and 29 March 2014
- 2014 Swedish general election 14 September 2014
- 2014 Swedish local elections 14 September 2014
- 2014 Turkish local elections 30 March and 1 June 2014
- 2014 Turkish presidential election 10 August 2014
- 2014 United Kingdom local elections 22 May 2014
- 2014 Ukrainian parliamentary election 26 October 2014
- 2014 Ukrainian presidential election 25 May 2014
- 2014 Kyiv local election 25 May 2014

=== European Parliament ===
- 2014 European Parliament election 22–25 May 2014

=== San Marino ===
- 2014 Sammarinese local elections 30 November 2014

== North America ==
=== Canada ===
- 2014 New Brunswick general election 22 September 2014
- 2014 Ontario municipal elections 27 October 2014
- 2014 Ontario general election 12 June 2014
- 2014 Quebec general election 7 April 2014

=== Costa Rica ===
- 2014 Costa Rican general election 2 February 2014

=== Panama ===
- 2014 Panamanian general election 4 May 2014

=== United States ===
- 2014 United States elections 4 November 2014
  - 2014 United States Senate elections 4 November 2014
  - 2014 United States House of Representatives elections 4 November 2014
  - 2014 United States gubernatorial elections 4 November 2014

== South America ==
=== Brazil ===
- 2014 Brazilian general election 5 and 26 October 2014

=== Colombia ===
- 2014 Colombian parliamentary election 9 March 2014
- 2014 Colombian presidential election 25 May and 15 June 2014

=== Uruguay ===
- 2014 Uruguayan general election 26 October 2014

== Oceania ==
=== Australia ===
- 2014 South Australian state election 15 March 2014
- 2014 Victorian state election 29 November 2014
- 2014 Tasmanian state election 15 March 2014

=== Fiji ===
- 2014 Fijian general election 17 September 2014

=== New Zealand ===
- 2014 New Zealand general election 20 September 2014

=== Tonga ===
- 2014 Tongan general election 27 November 2014

== See also ==
- List of next general elections
