= Al-Arabiya Coalition =

al-Arabiya Coalition Arabic Coalition إئتلاف العربية
- Leader: Saleh al-Mutlaq
- Founded: 2014
- Split from: Iraqi National Movement
- Political position: Centre-right to Right-wing
- Seats in the Council of Representatives: 0 / 328
- Seats in the Governorate Councils: 0 / 440

Website
- alarabiyacoalition.com

The Al-Arabiya Coalition (Arabic: إئتلاف العربيةI'tilāf alarabiya) also known as Arabic Coalition is an Iraqi political coalition formed for the 2014 Iraqi parliamentary election by then-Deputy Prime Minister of Iraq Saleh al-Mutlaq and others parties and independent politicians.

== History ==
For the 2013 governorate elections the coalition, then running under the name of Arab Iraqiyya, competed by itself in Anbar, Baghdad and Salah ad-Din. In the other governorates the coalition joined up with other parties, running as part of the Loyalty to Ninewa Bloc in Ninewa, as part of Iraqiyat Diyala in Diyala, and as part of Iraqiyat Babil in Babil.

== Members ==
The following parties make up the coalition:

- Iraqi National Dialogue Front – led by Saleh al-Mutlaq
- Nishor (Resurrection) Iraqi Party – led by Imad Jabir Ibrahim Mohammad al-Rawi
- Stability Bloc – led by Jasim Mohammad Hasan Atiyah
- National Masses Alliance – led by Ahmed Abdullah al-Jabouri
- Nahrain (Two Rivers) National Movement – led by Mishan Mahdi Jabar Nusaif
- Gathering of the National Promise in Saladin – led by Khalid Abdullah Hussein Mohammad al-Jahara
- Supreme Masses Bloc – led by Adnan Thiab Ghanim Michthab
- Iraq of Civilization (The Light) – led by Talal Hussein Muhssin Ali
- Muqtaderun Gathering for Peace and Building – led by Badr Mahmoud Fahal Khalil

Other politicians aligned with the coalition include Jamal Al-Karboli from al-Hal.

== Electoral results ==
=== Iraqi Parliament ===
Council of Representatives
Election year	# of overall votes	% of overall vote	# of overall seats won	+/–	Leader
2014	315,858 (#8)	2.43	10 / 328	–	Saleh al-Mutlaq

=== Governorate Councils ===
Governorate Councils
Election year	# of overall votes	% of overall vote	# of overall seats won	+/–	Leader
2013			18 / 601	–	Saleh al-Mutlaq
