= 2009 Diyala governorate election =

2009 Diyala Governorate election
← 2005	31 January 2009	2013 →

All 29 seats for the Diyala Governorate council
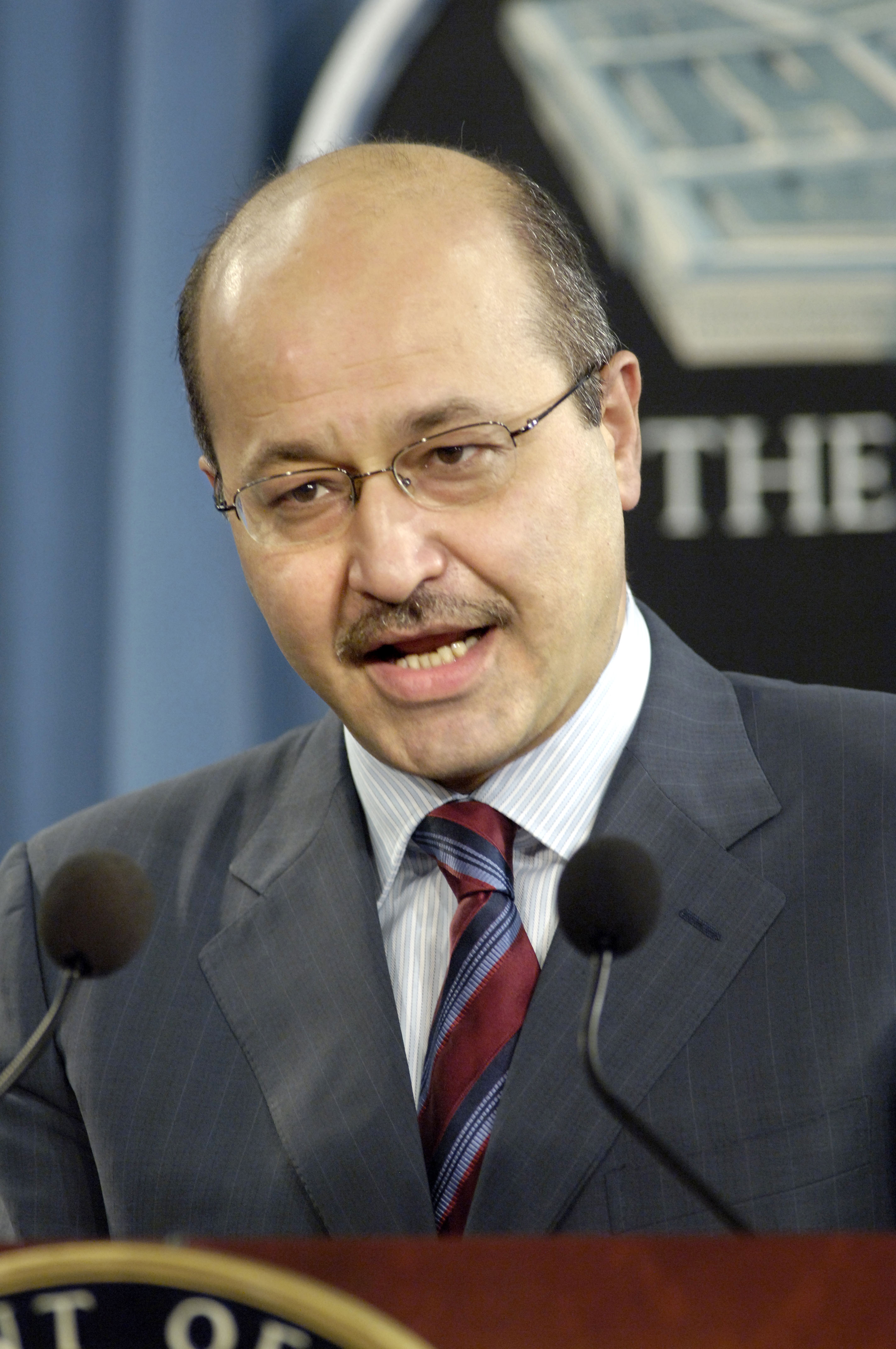

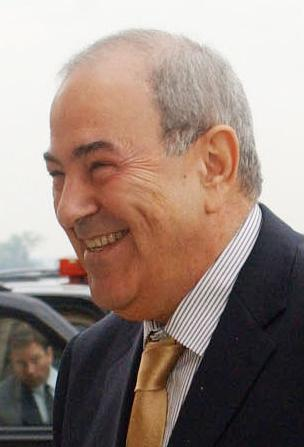
	First party	Second party
Leader	Ayad al-Samarrai	Saleh al-Mutlaq
Party	Tawafuq	INDF
Last election	14	0
Seats before	14	0
Seats won	9	6
Seat change	▼5	▲6
Popular vote	91,135	66,309
Percentage	21.2%	15.4%
Swing	▼18.9%	▲15.4%
	Third party	Fourth party
Leader	Barham Salih	Ayad Allawi
Party	Kurdistani List	INL
Last election	7	0
Seats before	7	0
Seats won	6	3
Seat change	▼1	▲3
Popular vote	62,219	42,650
Percentage	14.5%	9.9%
Swing	▲0.12%	▲9.9%
Governor of Diyala before election
Raad Hameed al-Mula al-Tamimi
ISCI
Subsequent Governor
Abdulnasir al-Muntasirbillah
Tawafuq

The Diyala governorate election of 2009 was held on 31 January 2009 alongside elections for all other governorates outside Iraqi Kurdistan and Kirkuk.

== Campaign ==
A Sunni Arab candidate from the National Reform Trend was killed near the disputed town of Mandali.

== Results ==
Immediately after the election, the Iraqi National List and the Iraqi National Dialogue Front claimed victory in Diyala. The final results saw them both winning seats, but no part having an overall majority.

A month after the vote, 2000 supporters of ISCI protested at the results, saying internally displaced refugee supporters had been unable to vote, and a large number of their supporters had turned up to vote to find their names were not on the electoral roll.

In March, the INDF said they would form an alliance with the State of Law Coalition and the Iraqi Islamic Party allied with the Islamic Supreme Council of Iraq.

Party	Votes	%	Seats	+/–
Tawafuq	91,135	21.17	9	−5
Hiwar	66,309	15.41	6	+6
Kurdistan Alliance	62,219	14.46	6	−1
Iraqi National List	42,650	9.91	3	+3
State of Law Coalition	27,408	6.37	2	+2
Diyala Coalition	25,068	5.82	2	+2
National Reform Trend	20,140	4.68	1	+1
Other parties	95,478	22.18	0	–
Total	430,407	100.00	29	−12
Source: Niqash, Al Sumaria, New York Times
