= 2014 Iraqi presidential election =

- 24 July 2014
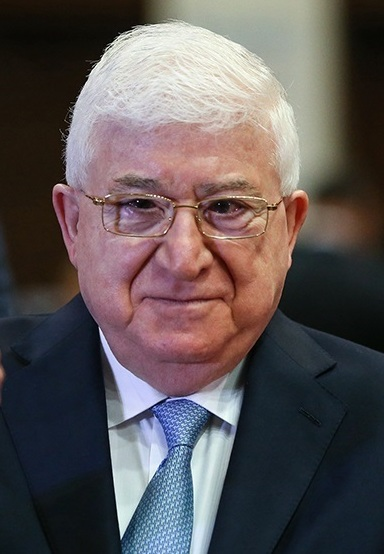
Candidate	Fuad Masum	Hussein Al-Moussawi
Party	PUK	Independent
Indirect vote	211	17
Percentage	92.86%	7.14%
President before election
Jalal Talabani
PUK
Elected president
Fuad Masum
PUK

Presidential elections were held in Iraq on 24 July 2014 to elect the President of Iraq for a four-year term via indirect suffrage by the Council of Representatives. The result was a win for Fuad Masum, who received 211 votes. The position is largely ceremonial, with Iraq being a parliamentary system.

== Candidates ==
102 candidates registered for the presidency. Major candidates include:

=== Patriotic Union of Kurdistan ===
Due to muhasasa, Kurdish members of the PUK were the forerunners for the presidency.

- Fuad Masum, former Prime Minister of the Kurdistan Region between 1992 until 1994 and member of constitution drafting committee.
- Barham Salih, former deputy prime minister of Iraq for two terms and former Prime Minister of the Kurdistan Region from 2009 until 2012

=== Other Candidates ===
- Hanan al-Fatlawi, Iraqi MP serving from 2004 and member of the Foreign Relations Parliamentary Committee.
- Faiq Al Sheikh Ali, member of the Judiciary Parliamentary Committee and Secretary-General of the People's Party for Reform.
- Hareth Shanshal, MP representing the Mandaean minority.

== Election ==
On July 24, Council of Representatives held its third session to elect the President. Before voting took place, Barham Salih announced his withdrawal after the PUK chose Fuad Masum as its sole candidate. Hareth Shanshal also announced his withdrawal. Following the first round of voting, Fuad Masum got first place with 175 votes. As no candidate won two-thirds majority in first round, a runoff was held. After that, Hanan Al-Fatlawi announced her withdrawal from the second round following a request from Baha Araji. Faiq Al Sheikh Ali also announced his withdrawal following his speech about the diversity of Iraq and criticizing muhasasa.

The runoff took place between Fuad Masum and fourth-placed Hussein Al-Moussawi. Masum won the election with 211 votes compared to Al-Moussawi’s 17. Following the election, Masum took his oath in the Council of Representatives immediately.

== Results ==
Candidate	Party	First round		Second round	
Candidate	Party	Votes	%	Votes	%
Fuad Masum	Patriotic Union of Kurdistan	175	76.42	221	92.86
Hussein Al-Moussawi	Independent	3	1.31	17	7.14
Hanan al-Fatlawi	State of Law Coalition	37	16.16		
Faiq Al Sheikh Ali	Civil Democratic Alliance	10	4.37		
Hameed Hammadi		2	0.87		
Hussein Al-Lami		1	0.44		
Thaer Ghanem		1	0.44		
Total		229	100.00	238	100.00
Valid votes		229	83.27	238	85.30
Invalid/blank votes		46	16.73	41	14.70
Total votes		275	100.00	279	100.00
Registered voters/turnout		328	83.84	328	85.06
Source: Iraqi Parliament
