= Iraqi Scholars and Intellectuals Group =

The Iraqi Scholars and Intellectuals Group (List 455) is an Iraqi political coalition formed in 2007. It is predominantly formed from the minority Sunni sect and calls for "employing a moderate religious approach to reinforce national unity". In the 2009 Iraqi governorate elections they took 6% of the vote and 3 seats in Salah ad Din, 3.2% but no seats in Anbar and 1.3% but no seats in Diyala. In March 2009 one of its leaders was assassinated in Basrah.
