= 2014 Iraqi parliamentary election =

- 30 April 2014

All 328 seats to the Council of Representatives 165 seats needed for a majority
- Turnout: 62%
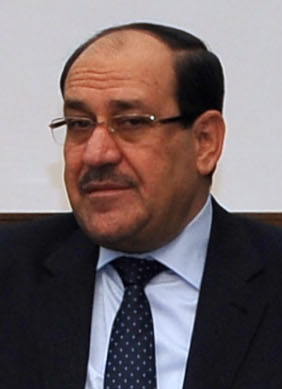

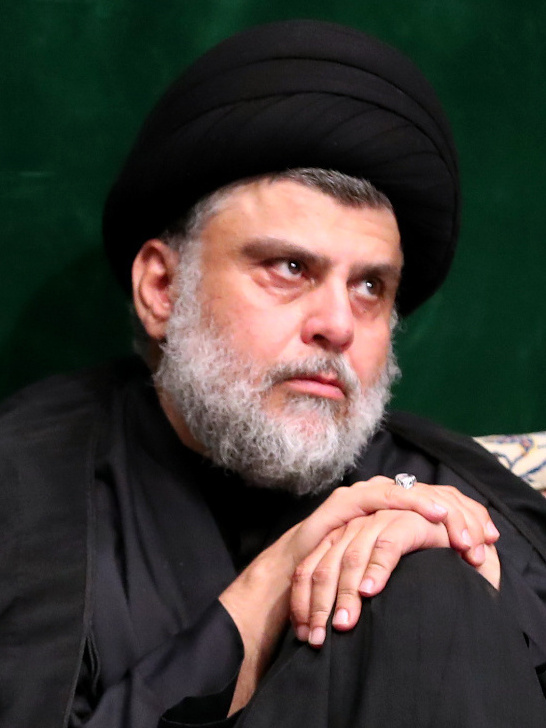

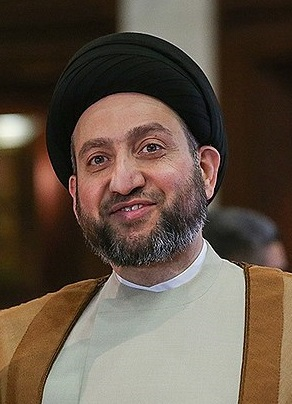

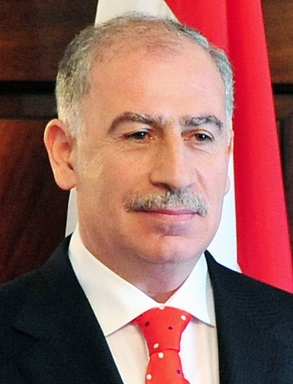

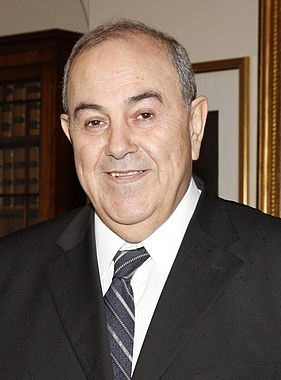

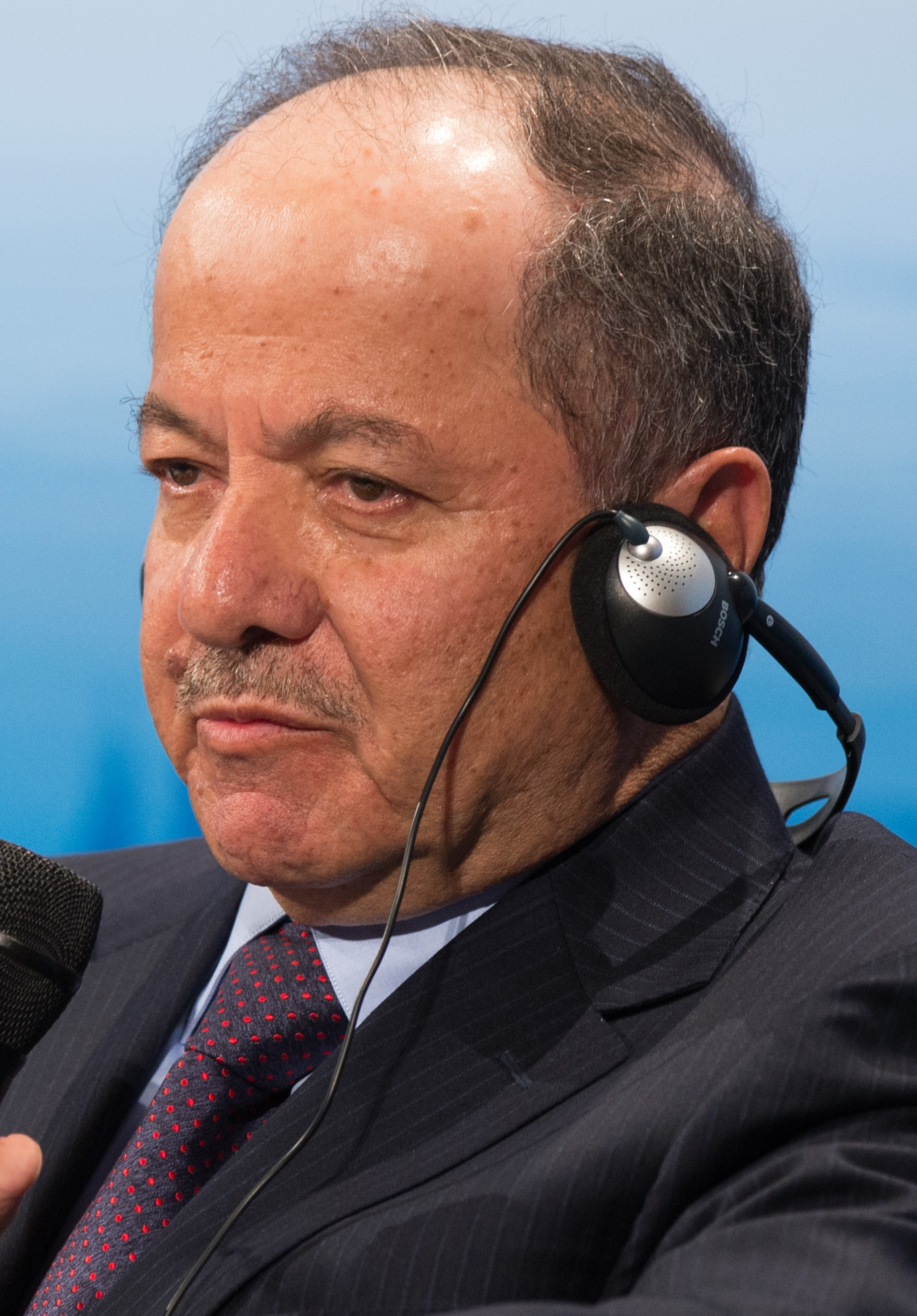

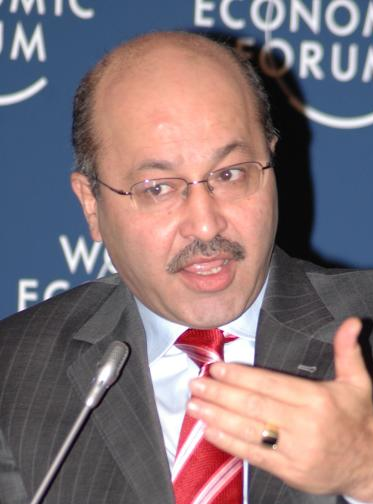

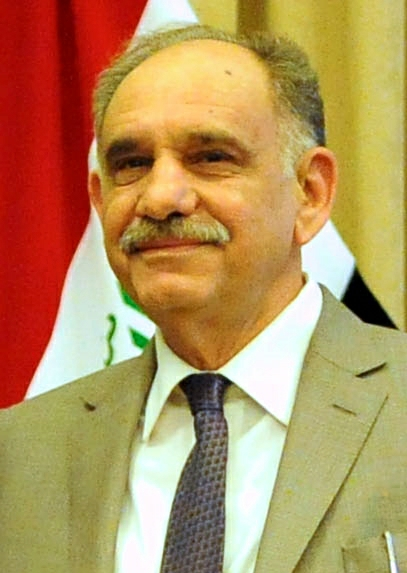

Leader	Nouri al-Maliki	Muqtada al-Sadr	Ammar al-Hakim
Alliance	State of Law	al-Ahrar	Al-Muwatin
Last election	89	39	18
Seats won	92	34	29
Seat change	▲3	▼5	▲11
Popular vote	3,141,835	917,589	982,003
Percentage	24.14%	7.05%	7.55%
Leader	Usama al-Nujayfi	Ayad Allawi	Masoud Barzani
Alliance	Muttahidoon	Al-Wataniya	KDP
Last election	9	28	29
Seats won	23	21	25
Seat change	▲14	▼7	▼4
Popular vote	680,690	686,017	1,038,002
Percentage	5.23%	5.27%	7.98%
Leader	Barham Salih	Saleh al-Mutlaq	Nawshirwan Mustafa
Alliance	PUK	al-Arabiya	Gorran
Last election	14	16	8
Seats won	21	10	9
Seat change	▲7	▼6	▲1
Popular vote	851,326	315,858	451,858
Percentage	6.07%	2.43%	3.47%
- Colours denote which party won the most votes in every governorate
Prime Minister before election
Nouri al-Maliki
State of Law
Prime Minister-designate
Haidar al-Abadi
State of Law

Parliamentary elections were held in Iraq on 30 April 2014. The elections decided the 328 members of the Council of Representatives who will in turn elect the Iraqi president and prime minister.

== Electoral system ==
The open list form of party-list proportional representation, using the governorates as the constituencies, is the electoral system used. The counting system has been changed slightly from the largest remainder method to the modified Sainte-Laguë method due to a ruling by the Supreme Court of Iraq that the previous method discriminated against smaller parties. Seven "compensatory" seats that were awarded at the national level to those parties whose national share of the vote wasn't reflected in the seats won at the governorate level have been allocated to individual governorates. Eight seats remain reserved for minority groups at the national level: five for Assyrians and one each for Mandaeans, Yezidis, and Shabaks.

=== Seat allocation ===
Prior to the elections, the parliament decided to expand from 325 to 328. As with the 2010 elections, 8 seats were reserved for ethnic and religious minorities. Unlike previous elections, there were no compensatory seats.

Governorate	Seats 2010	Seats 2014	Changes
Al Anbar Governorate	14	15	+1
Babil Governorate	16	17	+1
Baghdad Governorate	68	69	+1
Basra Governorate	24	25	+1
Dahuk Governorate	10	11	+1
Dhi Qar Governorate	18	19	+1
Diyala Governorate	13	14	+1
Erbil Governorate	14	15	+1
Karbala Governorate	10	11	+1
Kirkuk Governorate	12	12	
Maysan Governorate	10	10	
Muthanna Governorate	7	7	
Najaf Governorate	12	12	
Nineveh Governorate	31	31	
Al-Qādisiyyah Governorate	11	11	
Saladin Governorate	12	12	
Sulaymaniyah Governorate	17	18	+1
Wasit Governorate	11	11	
Compensatory seats	7	0	−7
Minorities	8	8	
Total	325	328	+3

== Campaign ==
The campaign was expected to focus on competition within the three main religious and ethnic communities: Shi'ite Arabs, Sunni Arabs and Kurds. While under the Constitution of Iraq the head of the largest coalition has the first call to become prime minister, in a precedent set following the 2010 election, a revised coalition can be formed following the election. This reduced the incentive for parties to form broad coalitions prior to the election. So in November 2011, Iraq's Independent High Electoral Commission approved 276 political entities to run in the elections, including a number of coalitions.

Shi'ite Arabs were split between the Prime Minister's State of Law Coalition, the Sadrist al-Ahrar Bloc, and the Islamic Supreme Council of Iraq backed al-Muwatin coalition. The former secular, non-sectarian Iraqiya bloc – 2010 the strongest force elected into parliament – had broken apart into Usama al-Nujayfi's Sunni regionalist Muttahidoon coalition, Ayad Allawi's National Coalition al-Wataniya, and Saleh al-Mutlaq's al-Arabiya Coalition. And the two prominent Kurdish parties, Masoud Barzani's Kurdistan Democratic Party (KDP) and Jalal Talabani's Patriotic Union of Kurdistan (PUK), were joined by a third Kurdish party, the Movement for Change (Gorran) headed by Nawshirwan Mustafa.

== Conduct ==
As members of the security forces voted on Monday 28 April, six different polling stations were hit by suicide bombers, leading to at least 27 deaths. Insurgent group Islamic State of Iraq and Syria has threatened violence against Sunni Muslims who vote in the election.

== Results ==
The IHEC confirmed the results on 25 May.

Party	Votes	%	Seats	+/–
State of Law Coalition	3,141,835	24.14	92	3
Al-Muwatin	982,003	7.55	29	+11
Al-Ahrar Bloc	917,589	7.05	28	New
Kurdistan Democratic Party	852,198	6.55	19	–10
Patriotic Union of Kurdistan	789,519	6.07	19	+5
Al-Wataniya	686,017	5.27	21	–7
Muttahidoon	680,690	5.23	23	New
Gorran Movement	451,858	3.47	9	+1
Al-Arabiya Coalition	315,858	2.43	10	–6
Islamic Virtue Party	211,257	1.62	6	New
National Reform Trend	192,763	1.48	6	New
Nineveh Kurdistan Alliance	185,804	1.43	6	–
Kurdistan Islamic Union	165,856	1.27	4	–1
Diyala Is Our Identity	159,605	1.23	5	New
Iraq Alliance	153,672	1.18	5	New
Kurdistan Islamic Group	137,504	1.06	3	–
Elites Movement	116,268	0.89	3	New
Civil Democratic Alliance	112,563	0.86	3	+3
National Partnership Gathering	110,933	0.85	3	New
National Nineveh Alliance	79,071	0.61	3	New
Iraqi Turkmen Front	71,492	0.55	2	–
Iraqi Loyalty Coalition	67,796	0.52	2	New
Kafa'at & Jamahir Coalition	67,084	0.52	2	New
Kurdistani Peace List	61,807	0.47	2	–
Anbar Loyalty Coalition	58,994	0.45	3	New
Unity of the Sons of Iraq	46,627	0.36	2	New
National Alliance of Saladin	46,039	0.35	1	New
Independent Civil Alternative Coalition	41,090	0.32	1	New
Arab Alliance of Kirkuk	38,328	0.29	1	–
Karama Alliance	36,288	0.28	1	New
Al-Sadiqoun Bloc	36,026	0.28	1	–
Equitable State Movement	31,973	0.25	1	New
Islamic Dawa Party	27,515	0.21	1	–
National Coalition in Saladin	26,910	0.21	1	New
Solidarity in Iraq Coalition	26,013	0.20	1	New
Rafidain List	24,353	0.19	2	–1
Chaldean Syriac Assyrian Popular Council	23,781	0.18	2	0
Khalas Coalition	18,229	0.14	1	New
Yazidi Movement for Reform and Progress	14,910	0.11	1	0
Iraqi Communist Party	12,626	0.10	1	+1
Mandean List	7,194	0.06	1	–
Council of Free Shabaks	3,375	0.03	1	–
Other parties	1,782,452	13.70	0	–
Total	13,013,765	100.00	328	+3
Registered voters/turnout	21,503,875	–		
Source: ORSAM

=== By governorate ===
==== Al Anbar Governorate ====
Party	Total votes	Percentage	Seats	Party Leader
Muttahidoon (259)	81,608	21.90%	4	Usama al-Nujayfi
Anbar Loyalty Coalition (271)	58,994	15.83%	3	Kassem Mohammad Abed Hamadi
Al Wataniya Coalition (239)	49,698	13.34%	2	Ayad Allawi
Iraq Sons Unity (233)	46,627	12.51%	2	Saadoun al-Dulaimi
Al-Arabiya Coalition (255)	34,193	9.18%	2	Saleh al-Mutlaq
Iraq Alliance (Etelaf Al-Iraq) (262)	23,757	6.38%	1	Fadel Jasem Mohammad Aziz Alchamri
Khalas Coalition (254)	18,229	4.89%	1	Ali Farhan Hamid
Wisdom Knights Project	59,504	15.97%	0	Yassin Hadi Badawi Morhei
Loyalty and Labor Movement	59,504	15.97%	0	Cherwan Kamel Sabti Chnin
National Adjustment Movement	59,504	15.97%	0	Kamil al-Dulaimi
Civil Democratic Alliance	59,504	15.97%	0	Ali Kazem Aziz al-Rafei
Islamic Daawa Party	59,504	15.97%	0	Abed Alkarim Ali Housayn Mahdi
National Euphrates Coalition	59,504	15.97%	0	Romyo Hozayran Nisan
Ur National List	59,504	15.97%	0	Ablahd Ifrayem Sawa Hanna
Sorayii National Alliance	59,504	15.97%	0	Wallim Khemmo Warda Warda
Al Rafidain List (Assyrian Democratic Movement)	59,504	15.97%	0	Yonadam Kanna
Unified Mandaii Entity	59,504	15.97%	0	Khaled Hamid Cheltagh Haloub
National Warkaa' List	59,504	15.97%	0	Chmayran Mourawkel Odicho Chlaymouna
Assyrian Chaldean Popular Council	59,504	15.97%	0	Fahmi Youssef Mansour Morkoss
Abnaa' Al Nahrayn	59,504	15.97%	0	Kalawiz Chaba Jiji Chaba
Shalama Entity	59,504	15.97%	0	Ano Jawhar Abed Almasih Eliya
Nouri Sitti Sahar Ani (Independent)	59,504	15.97%	0	
Babylons List	59,504	15.97%	0	Rayane Salem Sadek
Hamed Rouwayd (Independent)	59,504	15.97%	0	
Hareth Shanshal Sunaid al-Harithi (Independent)	59,504	15.97%	0	Hareth Shanshal Sunaid
Total	372,610	100%	15	
Sources: al-Sumaria - al-Anbar Coalitions, IHEC Al Anbar Results, ISW

==== Arbil Governorate ====
Party	Total votes	Percentage	Seats	Party Leader
Kurdistan Democratic Party (KDP) (213)	354,735	47.65%	7	Masoud Barzani
Patriotic Union of Kurdistan (PUK) (266)	168,688	22.66%	4	Jalal Talabani
Movement for Change (Gorran) (234)	104,059	13.98%	2	Nawshirwan Mustafa
Kurdistan Islamic Group (KIG) (237)	80,492	10.81%	2	Mohammad Najib Hassan Ali
Al Rafidain List (Assyrian Democratic Movement)	36,515	4.90%	0	Yonadam Kanna
Assyrian Chaldean Popular Council	36,515	4.90%	0	Fahmi Youssef Mansour Morkoss
National Warkaa' List	36,515	4.90%	0	Chmayran Mourawkel Odicho Chlaymouna
Abnaa' Al Nahrayn	36,515	4.90%	0	Kalawiz Chaba Jiji Chaba
Shalama Entity	36,515	4.90%	0	Ano Jawhar Abed Almasih Eliya
Nouri Sitti Sahar Ani (Independent)	36,515	4.90%	0	
Babylons List	36,515	4.90%	0	Rayane Salem Sadek
Hamed Rouwayd (Independent)	36,515	4.90%	0	
Hareth Shanshal Sunaid al-Harithi (Independent)	36,515	4.90%	0	Hareth Shanshal Sunaid
Al Wataniya Coalition	36,515	4.90%	0	Ayad Allawi
National Euphrates Coalition	36,515	4.90%	0	Romyo Hozayran Nisan
Ur National List	36,515	4.90%	0	Ablahd Ifrayem Sawa Hanna
Sorayii National Alliance	36,515	4.90%	0	Wallim Khemmo Warda Warda
Unified Mandaii Entity	36,515	4.90%	0	Khaled Hamid Cheltagh Haloub
Kurdistani National Alliance List	36,515	4.90%	0	Khaled Hamid Cheltagh Haloub
Kurdistan Islamic Movement (KIM)	36,515	4.90%	0	Orfan Ali Abed Alaziz Mohammad
Kurdistan Islamic Union (KIU)	36,515	4.90%	0	Mohammad Faraj Ahmad Aziz
Iraqi Turkmen Front	36,515	4.90%	0	Archad Rachad Fateh Allah Abed Alrazzak
Total	744,489	100%	15	
Sources: al-Sumaria - Arbil Coalitions, IHEC Arbil Results, ISW

==== Babil Governorate ====
Party	Total votes	Percentage	Seats	Party Leader
State of Law Coalition (277)	230,346	30.7%	7	Nouri al-Maliki
Al-Muwatin Coalition (273)	109,756	14.7%	3	Ammar al-Hakim
Al-Ahrar Bloc (214)	89,572	12.0%	3	Dia al-Asadi
Competences and People Gathering (Kafa'at & Jamaheer) (230)	34,698	4.6%	1	Haysam Ramadan Abed Ali Harit al-Jabouri
Al Wataniya Coalition (239)	32,602	4.4%	1	Ayad Allawi
Equitable State Movement (202)	31,973	4.3%	1	Kohtan Abbas Neiman Houssayn
National Reform Alliance / Al Jaafari (205)	31,329	4.2%	1	Ibrahim al-Jaafari
Iraqi Alternative Coalition	188,897	25.21%	0	Ahmad Abed Alzahra al-Fetlawi
National Euphrates Coalition	188,897	25.21%	0	Romyo Hozayran Nisan
Ur National List	188,897	25.21%	0	Ablahd Ifrayem Sawa Hanna
Sorayii National Alliance	188,897	25.21%	0	Wallim Khemmo Warda Warda
Al Rafidain List (Assyrian Democratic Movement)	188,897	25.21%	0	Yonadam Kanna
Unified Mandaii Entity	188,897	25.21%	0	Khaled Hamid Cheltagh Haloub
National Warkaa' List	188,897	25.21%	0	Chmayran Mourawkel Odicho Chlaymouna
Assyrian Chaldean Popular Council	188,897	25.21%	0	Fahmi Youssef Mansour Morkoss
Abnaa' Al Nahrayn	188,897	25.21%	0	Kalawiz Chaba Jiji Chaba
Shalama Entity	188,897	25.21%	0	Ano Jawhar Abed Almasih Eliya
Nouri Sitti Sahar Ani (Independent)	188,897	25.21%	0	
Babylons List	188,897	25.21%	0	Rayane Salem Sadek
Hamed Rouwayd (Independent)	188,897	25.21%	0	
Hareth Shanshal Sunaid al-Harithi (Independent)	188,897	25.21%	0	Hareth Shanshal Sunaid
Loyalty and Labor Movement	188,897	25.21%	0	Karim Oftan al-Jamili
People of civilization	188,897	25.21%	0	Sadek Hachem Fadel Alfihan al-Maamouri
Al-Sadiqoun Bloc	188,897	25.21%	0	Adnan Fihan Moussa Cheri
Civil Democratic Alliance	188,897	25.21%	0	Ali Kazem Aziz al-Rafei
Shames Movement	188,897	25.21%	0	Ahmad Hassan Mohammad Abdallah al-Doujayli
Iraqi Loyalty Coalition	188,897	25.21%	0	Sami Jassem Attiya al-Askari
Iraq Alliance (Etelaf Al-Iraq)	188,897	25.21%	0	Fadel Jasem Mohammad Aziz al-Chamri
Independent Professional Movement	188,897	25.21%	0	Mohammad Jasem Mohammad Toufan
Islamic Daawa Party	188,897	25.21%	0	Abed Alkarim Ali Housayn Mahdi
White Bloc	188,897	25.21%	0	Jamal Abed Almahdi Ali al-Battikh
Islamic Virtue Party (Al-Fadhila and Independent Elite Coalition)	188,897	25.21%	0	Hachem Abed Alhassan Ali Hachem
Total	749,173	100%	17	
Sources: ISW, al-Sumaria - Babil Coalitions, IHEC Babil Results

==== Baghdad Governorate ====
Party	Total votes	Percentage	Seats	Party Leader
State of Law Coalition (277)	1,074,609	38.08%	30	Nouri al-Maliki
Al Wataniya Coalition (239)	348,205	12.34%	10	Ayad Allawi
Al-Ahrar Bloc (214)	236,547	8.38%	6	Dia al-Asadi
Al-Muwatin Coalition (273)	192,691	6.83%	5	Ammar al-Hakim
Muttahidoon (259)	155,719	5.52%	4	Usama al-Nujayfi
Elites Movement (251)	116,268	4.12%	3	Abazer Jassem Houssayn Hammoud
Civil Democratic Alliance (232)	112,563	3.99%	3	Ali Kazem Aziz al-Rafei
National Partnership Gathering (269)	73,842	2.62%	2	Mouhannad Mahdi Kamar Jazei
Iraq Alliance (Etelaf Al-Iraq) (262)	57,333	2.03%	2	Fadel Jasem Mohammad Aziz al-Chamri
Al-Arabiya Coalition (255)	53,719	1.90%	1	Saleh al-Mutlaq
Islamic Virtue Party (Al-Fadhila and Independent Elite Coalition) (219)	51,290	1.82%	1	Hachem Abed al-Hassan Ali Hachem
National Reform Alliance / Al Jaafari (205)	47,617	1.69%	1	Ibrahim al-Jaafari
Al-Sadiqoun Bloc (218)	36,026	1.28%	1	Adnan Fihan Moussa Cheri
Hareth Shanshal Sunaid al-Harithi (Independent); Reserved Mandaean (Sabian) Seat (295)	7,194	0.25%	1	Hareth Shanshal Sunaid
Equitable State Movement	258,296	9.15%	0	Kohtan Abbas Neiman Houssayn
Comprehensive Rise Gathering	258,296	9.15%	0	Fadel Abbas Hassan Jaber al-Bahadli
Openness Bloc	258,296	9.15%	0	Mohammoud Jasem Zboun Ghajari
Shames Movement	258,296	9.15%	0	Ahmad Hassan Mohammad Abdallah al-Doujayli
Iraqi Loyalty Coalition	258,296	9.15%	0	Sami Jassem Attiya al-Askari
Independent Popular Gathering	258,296	9.15%	0	Fallah Hassan Yassin Youssef
People and competences gathering	258,296	9.15%	0	Haysam Ramadan Abed Ali Harit al-Jabouri
Iraqi advocates for State support	258,296	9.15%	0	Ahmad Rasan Mehna Machkour
Flying flag bloc	258,296	9.15%	0	Sabah Hassan Ghoulam Ahmad
We Work for Iraq Coalition	258,296	9.15%	0	Ali Dari Ali al-Fayyad
New change coalition	258,296	9.15%	0	Naser Hachem Saalab al-Saidi
Iraq List for Sharing and Charity	258,296	9.15%	0	Rouchdi Saayd Kader Mohamad al-Jaf
Independent Glory Bloc	258,296	9.15%	0	Adham Hmadi Ziyab Abed
Independent Professional Movement	258,296	9.15%	0	Mohammad Jasem Mohammad Toufan
Karama	258,296	9.15%	0	Ahmad Charei Ibrahim Aaboub
United Kurdish Coalition	258,296	9.15%	0	Feryad Mohammad Taki Hassan
Iraqi Alternative Coalition	258,296	9.15%	0	Ahmad Abed Alzahra al-Fetlawi
Failis Bloc	258,296	9.15%	0	Issam Naser Hamid al-Saffar
Peace and Well Being Coalition	258,296	9.15%	0	Jamal Mohammad Hassan al-Wakil
Independent Women Movement	258,296	9.15%	0	Asmaa Yassin Mohammad
Independent Solidarity Bloc	258,296	9.15%	0	Mohammad Mohammad Saleh Jawad al-Haydari
Alliance of Loyals to the Nation	258,296	9.15%	0	Wael Abed Allatif Housayn
National Euphrates Coalition	258,296	9.15%	0	Romyo Hozayran Nisan
Ur National List	258,296	9.15%	0	Ablahd Ifrayem Sawa Hanna
Sorayii National Alliance	258,296	9.15%	0	Wallim Khemmo Warda Warda
Al Rafidain List (Assyrian Democratic Movement)	258,296	9.15%	0	Yonadam Kanna
Unified Mandaii Entity	258,296	9.15%	0	Khaled Hamid Cheltagh Haloub
National Warkaa' List	258,296	9.15%	0	Chmayran Mourawkel Odicho Chlaymouna
Assyrian Chaldean Popular Council	258,296	9.15%	0	Fahmi Youssef Mansour Morkoss
Abnaa' Al Nahrayn	258,296	9.15%	0	Kalawiz Chaba Jiji Chaba
Shalama Entity	258,296	9.15%	0	Ano Jawhar Abed Almasih Eliya
Nouri Sitti Sahar Ani (Independent)	258,296	9.15%	0	
Babylons List	258,296	9.15%	0	Rayane Salem Sadek
Hamed Rouwayd (Independent)	258,296	9.15%	0	
Al Warithoun Bloc	258,296	9.15%	0	Mouhannad Hassan Mohammad Hassan
Tribes gathering of Iraq Nakhwa	258,296	9.15%	0	Fawwaz Dham Halil Ali
Islamic Daawa Party	258,296	9.15%	0	Abed Alkarim Ali Housayn Mahdi
Independent National Baghdad Bloc	258,296	9.15%	0	Fadel Abbas Chnit Kazem
White Bloc	258,296	9.15%	0	Jamal Abed Almahdi Ali al-Battikh
People Loyals List	258,296	9.15%	0	Ghaniy Rached Ouwaych Radi
Al Daii Party	258,296	9.15%	0	Abbas Fadel Hassan Abbas
Youth Movement of Sovereign law State	258,296	9.15%	0	Saad Abed al-Jaber Youssef al-Matlabi
Total	2,821,919	100%	69	
Sources: al-Sumaria - Baghdad Coalitions, IHEC Baghdad Results

==== Basra Governorate ====
Party	Total votes	Percentage	Seats	Party Leader
State of Law Coalition (277)	405,037	40.24%	12	Nouri al-Maliki
Al-Muwatin Coalition (273)	205,019	20.37%	6	Ammar al-Hakim
Al-Ahrar Bloc (214)	87,856	8.73%	3	Dia al-Asadi
National Reform Alliance / Al Jaafari (205)	51,048	5.07%	2	Ibrahim al-Jaafari
Islamic Virtue Party (Al-Fadhila and Independent Elite Coalition) (219)	45,475	4.52%	1	Hachem Abed al-Hassan Ali Hachem
Independent Civil Alternative Coalition (209)	41,090	4.08%	1	Sbayh Habib Yaser Mohsen
Equality and Justice Gathering	171,008	16.99%	0	Souhayl Daoud Hiyal al-Jazairi
Mohsen Hamid Mohsen Abbas al-Hawi (Independent)	171,008	16.99%	0	
Comprehensive Rise Gathering	171,008	16.99%	0	Fadel Abbas Hassan Jaber al-Bahadli
Al-Sadiqoun Bloc	171,008	16.99%	0	Adnan Fihan Moussa Cheri
White Bloc	171,008	16.99%	0	Jamal Abed Almahdi Ali al-Battikh
Shames Movement	171,008	16.99%	0	Ahmad Hassan Mohammad Abdallah al-Doujayli
Iraqi Loyalty Coalition	171,008	16.99%	0	Fadel Abbas Hassan Jaber al-Bahadli
Iraq Alliance (Etelaf Al-Iraq)	171,008	16.99%	0	Fadel Jasem Mohammad Aziz al-Chamri
People and Competences Gathering	171,008	16.99%	0	Haysam Ramadan Abed Ali Harit al-Jabouri
New Change Coalition	171,008	16.99%	0	Naser Hachem Saalab al-Saidi
Independent Professional Movement	171,008	16.99%	0	Mohammad Jasem Mohammad Toufan
Islamic Daawa Party	171,008	16.99%	0	Abed Alkarim Ali Housayn Mahdi
Al Wataniya Coalition	171,008	16.99%	0	Ayad Allawi
Iraqi Alternative Coalition	171,008	16.99%	0	Ahmad Abed Alzahra al-Fetlawi
Independent Women Movement	171,008	16.99%	0	Asmaa Yassin Mohammad
Alliance of Loyals to the Nation	171,008	16.99%	0	Wael Abed Allatif Housayn
National Euphrates Coalition	171,008	16.99%	0	Romyo Hozayran Nisan
Ur National List	171,008	16.99%	0	Ablahd Ifrayem Sawa Hanna
Sorayii National Alliance	171,008	16.99%	0	Wallim Khemmo Warda Warda
Al Rafidain List (Assyrian Democratic Movement)	171,008	16.99%	0	Yonadam Kanna
Unified Mandaii Entity	171,008	16.99%	0	Khaled Hamid Cheltagh Haloub
National Warkaa' List	171,008	16.99%	0	Chmayran Mourawkel Odicho Chlaymouna
Assyrian Chaldean Popular Council	171,008	16.99%	0	Fahmi Youssef Mansour Morkoss
Abnaa' Al Nahrayn	171,008	16.99%	0	Kalawiz Chaba Jiji Chaba
Shalama Entity	171,008	16.99%	0	Ano Jawhar Abed Almasih Eliya
Nouri Sitti Sahar Ani (Independent)	171,008	16.99%	0	
Babylons List	171,008	16.99%	0	Rayane Salem Sadek
Hamed Rouwayd (Independent)	171,008	16.99%	0	
Hareth Shanshal Sunaid al-Harithi (Independent)	171,008	16.99%	0	Hareth Shanshal Sunaid
Loyalty and Labor Movement	171,008	16.99%	0	Karim Oftan al-Jamili
Iraq for Development and Construction	171,008	16.99%	0	Ali Taleb Cherhan Karim
Total	1,006,533	100%	25	
Sources: al-Sumaria - Basra Coalitions, IHEC Basra Results

==== Dhi Qar Governorate ====
Party	Total votes	Percentage	Seats	Party Leader
State of Law Coalition (277)	237,552	32.58%	8	Nouri al-Maliki
Al-Muwatin Coalition (273)	110,196	15.12%	4	Ammar al-Hakim
Al-Ahrar Bloc (214)	70,480	9.67%	2	Dia al-Asadi
Islamic Virtue Party (Al-Fadhila and Independent Elite Coalition) (219)	49,502	6.79%	2	Hachem Abed Alhassan Ali Hachem
National Partnership Gathering (269)	37,091	5.09%	1	Mouhannad Mahdi Kamar Jazei
National Reform Alliance / Al Jaafari (205)	36,523	5.01%	1	Ibrahim al-Jaafari
Solidarity in Iraq (283)	26,013	3.57%	1	Mohammad Mahdi Mohammad Baker Abbas Awad
Comprehensive Rise Gathering	161,678	22.18%	0	Fadel Abbas Hassan Jaber al-Bahadli
Al-Sadiqoun Bloc	161,678	22.18%	0	Adnan Fihan Moussa Cheri
Equitable State Movement	161,678	22.18%	0	Kohtan Abbas Neiman Houssayn
Civil Democratic Alliance	161,678	22.18%	0	Ali Kazem Aziz al-Rafei
White Bloc	161,678	22.18%	0	Jamal Abed Almahdi Ali al-Battikh
Iraq Alliance (Etelaf Al-Iraq)	161,678	22.18%	0	Fadel Jasem Mohammad Aziz al-Chamri
Independent Popular Gathering	161,678	22.18%	0	Fallah Hassan Yassin Youssef
People and Competences Gathering	161,678	22.18%	0	Haysam Ramadan Abed Ali Harit al-Jabouri
Independent Professional Movement	161,678	22.18%	0	Mohammad Jasem Mohammad Toufan
Al Warithoun Bloc	161,678	22.18%	0	Mouhannad Hassan Mohammad Hassan
Islamic Daawa Party	161,678	22.18%	0	Abed Alkarim Ali Housayn Mahdi
Al Wataniya Coalition	161,678	22.18%	0	Ayad Allawi
Iraqi Alternative Coalition	161,678	22.18%	0	Ahmad Abed Alzahra al-Fetlawi
Alliance of Loyals to the Nation	161,678	22.18%	0	Wael Abed Allatif Housayn
National Euphrates Coalition	161,678	22.18%	0	Romyo Hozayran Nisan
Ur National List	161,678	22.18%	0	Ablahd Ifrayem Sawa Hanna
Sorayii National Alliance	161,678	22.18%	0	Wallim Khemmo Warda Warda
Al Rafidain List (Assyrian Democratic Movement)	161,678	22.18%	0	Yonadam Kanna
Unified Mandaii Entity	161,678	22.18%	0	Khaled Hamid Cheltagh Haloub
National Warkaa' List	161,678	22.18%	0	Chmayran Mourawkel Odicho Chlaymouna
Assyrian Chaldean Popular Council	161,678	22.18%	0	Fahmi Youssef Mansour Morkoss
Abnaa' Al Nahrayn	161,678	22.18%	0	Kalawiz Chaba Jiji Chaba
Shalama Entity	161,678	22.18%	0	Ano Jawhar Abed Almasih Eliya
Nouri Sitti Sahar Ani (Independent)	161,678	22.18%	0	
Babylons List	161,678	22.18%	0	Rayane Salem Sadek
Hamed Rouwayd (Independent)	161,678	22.18%	0	
Hareth Shanshal Sunaid al-Harithi (Independent)	161,678	22.18%	0	Hareth Shanshal Sunaid
Loyalty and Labor Movement	161,678	22.18%	0	Karim Oftan al-Jamili
National Loyalty Bloc	161,678	22.18%	0	Cherwan Kamel Sabti Chnin
Total	729,035	100%	19	
Sources: al-Sumaria - Dhi Qar Coalitions, IHEC Dhi Qar Results

==== Diyala Governorate ====
Party	Total votes	Percentage	Seats	Party Leader
Diyala is Our Identity Coalition (246)	159,605	28.49%	5	Amer Habib Khayzaran
State of Law Coalition (277)	105,622	18.85%	3	Nouri al-Maliki
Al Wataniya Coalition (239)	68,565	12.24%	2	Ayad Allawi
Kurdistani Peace List (258)	61,807	11.03%	2	Chirko Mohammad Saleh Ahmad
Al-Muwatin Coalition (273)	39,495	7.05%	1	Ammar al-Hakim
Al-Ahrar Bloc (214)	36,057	6.44%	1	Dia al-Asadi
Other	89,149	15.91%	0	
Total	560,300	100%	14	
Sources: al-Sumaria - Diyala Coalitions, IHEC Diyala Results

==== Dohuk Governorate ====
Party	Total votes	Percentage	Seats	Party Leader
Kurdistan Democratic Party (KDP) (213)	340,977	69.52%	8	Masoud Barzani
Kurdistan Islamic Union (KIU) (274)	84,464	17.22%	2	Mohammad Faraj Ahmad Aziz
Patriotic Union of Kurdistan (PUK) (266)	37,457	7.64%	1	Jalal Talabani
Other	27,554	5.62%	0	
Total	490,452	100%	11	
Sources: al-Sumaria - Arbil Coalitions, IHEC Dohuk Results

==== Karbala Governorate ====
Party	Total votes	Percentage	Seats	Party Leader
State of Law Coalition (277)	212,753	47.76%	7	Nouri al-Maliki
Al-Ahrar Bloc (214)	60,818	13.65%	2	Dia al-Asadi
Al-Muwatin Coalition (273)	47,311	10.62%	1	Ammar al-Hakim
Islamic Virtue Party (Al-Fadhila and Independent Elite Coalition) (219)	29,494	6.62%	1	Hachem Abed Alhassan Ali Hachem
Other	95,082	21.34%	0	
Total	445,458	100%	11	
Sources: al-Sumaria - Karbala Coalitions, IHEC Karbala Results

==== Kirkuk Governorate ====
Party	Total votes	Percentage	Seats	Party Leader
Patriotic Union of Kurdistan (PUK) (266)	209,964	36.79%	6	Jalal Talabani
Kirkuk Turkmen Front List (280)	71,492	12.53%	2	Arshad Salihi
Kurdistan Democratic Party (KDP) (213)	63,076	11.05%	2	Masoud Barzani
Al-Arabiya Coalition (255)	53,796	9.43%	1	Saleh al-Mutlaq
Kirkuk Arab Coalition (242)	38,328	6.72%	1	Abed Alrahman Monched Assi Ali
Other	134,103	23.50%	0	
Total	570,759	100%	12	
Sources: al-Sumaria - Kirkuk Coalitions, IHEC Kirkuk Results

==== Maysan Governorate ====
Party	Total votes	Percentage	Seats	Party Leader
State of Law Coalition (277)	135,684	36.39%	4	Nouri al-Maliki
Al-Ahrar Bloc (214)	99,066	26.57%	3	Dia al-Asadi
Al-Muwatin Coalition (273)	56,786	15.23%	2	Ammar al-Hakim
National Reform Alliance / Al Jaafari (205)	26,246	7.04%	1	Ibrahim al-Jaafari
Other	55,057	14.77%	0	
Total	372,839	100%	10	
Sources: al-Sumaria - Maysan Coalitions, IHEC Maysan Results

==== Muthanna Governorate ====
Party	Total votes	Percentage	Seats	Party Leader
State of Law Coalition (277)	148,263	51.10%	4	Nouri al-Maliki
Al-Muwatin Coalition (273)	54,670	18.84%	2	Ammar al-Hakim
Al-Ahrar Bloc (214)	27,848	9.60%	1	Dia al-Asadi
Other	59,358	20.46%	0	
Total	290,139	100%	7	
Sources: al-Sumaria - Muthanna Coalitions, IHEC Muthanna Results

==== Najaf Governorate ====
Party	Total votes	Percentage	Seats	Party Leader
State of Law Coalition (277)	245,215	43.90%	6	Nouri al-Maliki
Al-Ahrar Bloc (214)	82,223	14.72%	2	Dia al-Asadi
Iraqi Loyalty Coalition (211)	67,796	12.14%	2	Sami Jassem Attiya Al Askari
Al-Muwatin Coalition (273)	57,699	10.33%	2	Ammar al-Hakim
Other	105,651	18.91%	0	
Total	558,584	100%	12	
Sources: al-Sumaria - Najaf Coalitions, IHEC Najaf Results

==== Nineveh Governorate ====
Party	Total votes	Percentage	Seats	Party Leader
Muttahidoon (259)	363,938	36.84%	12	Usama al-Nujayfi
Nineveh Kurdistan Alliance (243)	185,804	18.81%	6	Masoud Barzani
Al Wataniya Coalition (239)	116,292	11.77%	4	Ayad Allawi
National Nineveh Alliance (227)	79,071	8.00%	3	Ammar al-Hakim
Al-Arabiya Coalition (255)	74,654	7.56%	3	Saleh al-Mutlaq
Patriotic Union of Kurdistan (PUK) (266)	70,145	7.10%	2	Jalal Talabani
Iraq Alliance (Etelaf Al-Iraq) (262)	44,080	4.46%	1	Fadel Jasem Mohammad Aziz al-Chamri
Yazidi Movement for Reform and Progress; Yezidi Reserved Seat (292)	14,910	1.51%	1	Amin Farhan Jijo Brim
Shabak Ahrar Council; Shabak Reserved Seat (293)	3,375	0.34%	1	Houssayn Ali Mohammad Ahmad
Other	35,522	3.60%	0	
Total	987,791	100%	31	
Sources: al-Sumaria - Nineveh Coalitions, IHEC Nineveh Results

==== Al-Qādisiyyah Governorate ====
Party	Total votes	Percentage	Seats	Party Leader
State of Law Coalition (277)	173,146	35.73%	5	Nouri al-Maliki
Al-Ahrar Bloc (214)	49,348	10.18%	2	Dia al-Asadi
Al-Muwatin Coalition (273)	45,149	9.32%	1	Ammar al-Hakim
Islamic Virtue Party (Al-Fadhila and Independent Elite Coalition) (219)	35,496	7.32%	1	Hachem Abed al-Hassan Ali Hachem
Competences and People Gathering (Kafa'at & Jamaheer) (230)	32,386	6.68%	1	Haysam Ramadan Abed Ali Harit al-Jabouri
Islamic Dawa Party – Iraq Organisation (261)	27,515	5.68%	1	Abed Alkarim Ali Housayn Mahdi
Other	121,584	25.09%	0	
Total	484,624	100%	11	
Sources: al-Sumaria - Al-Qādisiyyah Coalitions, IHEC Al-Qādisiyyah Results

==== Saladin Governorate ====
Party	Total votes	Percentage	Seats	Party Leader
Al-Arabiya Coalition (255)	99,496	22.57%	3	Saleh al-Mutlaq
Muttahidoon (259)	79,425	18.01%	3	Usama al-Nujayfi
Al Wataniya Coalition (239)	70,655	16.03%	2	Ayad Allawi
National Alliance of Saladin (249)	46,039	10.44%	1	Houssayn Ibrahim Saleh al-Chahrastani
Karama (286)	36,288	8.23%	1	Ahmad Charei Ibrahim Aaboub
Iraq Alliance (Etelaf Al-Iraq) (262)	28,502	6.47%	1	Fadel Jasem Mohammad Aziz al-Chamri
National Coalition in Saladin (222)	26,910	6.10%	1	Diyaa Najem Abdallah Ahmad
Other	53,492	12.14%	0	
Total	440,807	100%	12	
Sources: al-Sumaria - Saladin Coalitions, IHEC Saladin Results

==== Sulaymaniyah Governorate ====
Party	Total votes	Percentage	Seats	Party Leader
Movement for Change (Gorran) (234)	347,799	38.94%	7	Nawshirwan Mustafa
Patriotic Union of Kurdistan (PUK) (266)	294,265	32.94%	6	Jalal Talabani
Kurdistan Democratic Party (KDP) (213)	93,410	10.46%	2	Masoud Barzani
Kurdistan Islamic Union (KIU) (274)	81,392	9.11%	2	Mohammad Faraj Ahmad Aziz
Kurdistan Islamic Group (KIG) (237)	57,102	6.39%	1	Mohammad Najib Hassan Ali
Other	19,258	2.16%	0	
Total	893,226	100%	18	
Sources: al-Sumaria - Sulaymaniyah Coalitions, IHEC Sulaymaniyah Results

==== Wasit Governorate ====
Party	Total votes	Percentage	Seats	Party Leader
State of Law Coalition (277)	173,608	35.07%	6	Nouri al-Maliki
Al-Ahrar Bloc (214)	77,774	15.71%	3	Dia al-Asadi
Al-Muwatin Coalition (273)	63,231	12.77%	2	Ammar al-Hakim
Other	180,414	36.45%	0	
Total	495,027	100%	11	
Sources: al-Sumaria - Wasit Coalitions, IHEC Wasit Results

=== Candidate votes ===
#	Candidate	Party	Election List	Governorate	Votes	+/–
1.	Nouri al-Maliki	Islamic Da'awa Party	State of Law Coalition	Baghdad	721,782	▲
2.	Ayad Allawi	Iraqi National Accord	al-Wataniya Coalition	Baghdad	229,709	▼
3.	aaram Muhammad Ali	Movement for Change	Movement for Change (Gorran) List	Sulaymaniyah	150,613	▲
4.	Najmiddin Karim	Patriotic Union of Kurdistan	PUK List	Kirkuk	150,084	▲
5.	Khalaf Abdul al Samad	Islamic Da'awa Party	State of Law Coalition	Basra	126,848	▲
6.	Usama al-Nujayfi	al-Hadba	Muttahidoon	Nineveh	112,551	▼
7.	Hanan Saeed Mohsen al-Fatlawi		State of Law Coalition	Babil	90,781	▲
8.	shirko Mirza Mohammad Amin	Patriotic Union of Kurdistan	PUK List	Sulaymaniyah	83,663	▲
9.	Mohammed Ghali Darraji		al-Ahrar Coalition	Baghdad	78,561	▲
10.	Ariz Abdullah Ahmed Mahmoud	Patriotic Union of Kurdistan	PUK List	Arbil	76,380	▲

== Government formation ==
The first session of the new parliament began on 1 July where all 328 members took oath to carry out their legal tasks and responsibilities devotedly and honestly and preserve the independence and sovereignty of Iraq, and safeguard the interests of its people. The constitution mentions that in the first session, the parliament has to elect a Speaker for the House along with two deputies. This didn't happen as some Kurdish and Sunni Arab MPs boycotted the session causing a lack of quorum since they did not agree on a single candidate. The next session took place on 13 July and brought about a consensus for the post of Speaker after it was announced that Salim al-Jabouri was the candidate. After Salim al-Jabouri was voted as Speaker of the House, the parliament voted for Fuad Masum as president who in turn asked Haider al-Abadi to form a government on 11 August. The government was formed on 8 September 2014 with most parties being part of the new government.
