= Juwan Fuad Masum =

Iraqi politician (born 1970)

Minister of Telecommunications
- In office 3 May 2005 – 20 May 2006
- Prime Minister: Ibrahim al-Jaafari
- Preceded by: Mohamed Ali Alhakim
- Succeeded by: Mohammed Tawfiq Allawi

Personal details
- Born: 1972 (age 53–54) Iraq
- Party: Patriotic Union of Kurdistan
- Parents: Fuad Masum; Rounak Abdulwahid Mustafa
- Education: King's College London (PhD)

Juwan Fuad Masum (born 1972) is an Iraqi politician who was the Minister of Telecommunications, serving in the Iraqi Transitional Government.

She is the daughter of Fuad Masum, the former Iraqi president. She is a member of the Patriotic Union of Kurdistan (PUK). She graduated from King's College London with a PhD in communications.
