= Dia al-Asadi =

Iraqi politician

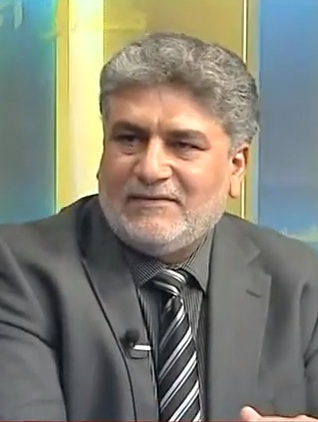
Dhiaa al-Asadi, guest of Al-Fayhaa TV, August 2014.

Dhiaa Najm Abdullah Al-Asadi (Arabic: ضياء نجم عبد الله الاسدي) is an Iraqi academic, politician and head of the Al-Ahrar Bloc in parliament, the second largest parliamentary bloc in the Iraqi Parliament after the 2014 Iraqi parliamentary election. The Al-Ahrar Bloc is considered a Sadrist Movement with cleric Muqtada al-Sadr as its spiritual leader.

Al-Asadi was born in 1969 in Basra Governorate. He studied English language and literature in the English Department of the College of Education, University of Basrah 1989 – 1992. After his graduation with a BA and a first rank among more than 90 students, he worked as a research assistant in the university for three years. Continuing with a master's degree, he was a university instructor for another three years.

He was imprisoned in 1999 for political activism after the assassination of Shia cleric Mohammad Mohammed Sadiq Al-Sadr, the cousin of the Shia thinker Mohammed Baqir Al-Sadr, both murdered by Saddam's regime in 1999 and 1980 respectively. Upon release the following year, he sought asylum in Jordan where he also taught English at an Al-Balqaʼ Applied University for three years and returned to Iraq in 2004 after the fall of Saddam Hussein's regime. From 2005 to 2006 he worked at the very department he graduated from, then he worked at Basrah Studies Center until 2007

He taught English language and literature at Iraqi universities and earned a fellowship in International Development from The Department of International Development at Birmingham University.

He was appointed Minister of State in the 2010 Iraqi government, but was removed in a government reshuffle the following year.

In 2011, he was elected as Secretary General of Al-Aharar Bloc and became in charge of all political movement connected to Sadrists in Iraq. In 2014, he stood for National Elections as a representative for voters in the Southern and Northern parts of Baghdad and won a seat in the Parliament and became Head of Al-Ahrar Bloc until 2015. . His bloc went on to win 34 seats in the 2014 Iraqi Parliament making Al Ahrar the first biggest single bloc and the second biggest coalition after Prime Minister Nouri al-Maliki' State of Law Coalition.

Al-Asadi has published several articles and critical essays in Arabic and English; he gave interviews in both languages to local and international channels and media and participated in tens of events and training courses as a participant and a trainer. Among his interests are: painting and calligraphy, writing short stories, and lecturing and public speech.
