= Kamil al-Dulaimi =

Iraqi politician

Karim Kamil Abbas al-Dulaimi (Arabic: كامل كريم عباس الدليمي; born 9 June 1965) is an Iraqi politician from Baghdad, and the leader of the National Corrective Movement. Dulaimi was formerly a member of the Iraqi parliament, being elected for the Iraqi National Movement (al-Iraqiya) for Anbar.

Following the collapse of al-Iraqiya Dulaimi ran his own party for the 2014 parliamentary election in Anbar. Dulaimi's National Corrective Movement failed to receive enough votes to be granted any seats.

== Opinions ==
Dulaimi was an open critic of US operations in Iraq during the Iraq War, particularly regarding the Haditha massacre, which he claimed showed "Americans still deal with Iraqis without any respect."
