= Haider al-Abadi =

Prime Minister of Iraq from 2014 to 2018

- حيدر العبادي
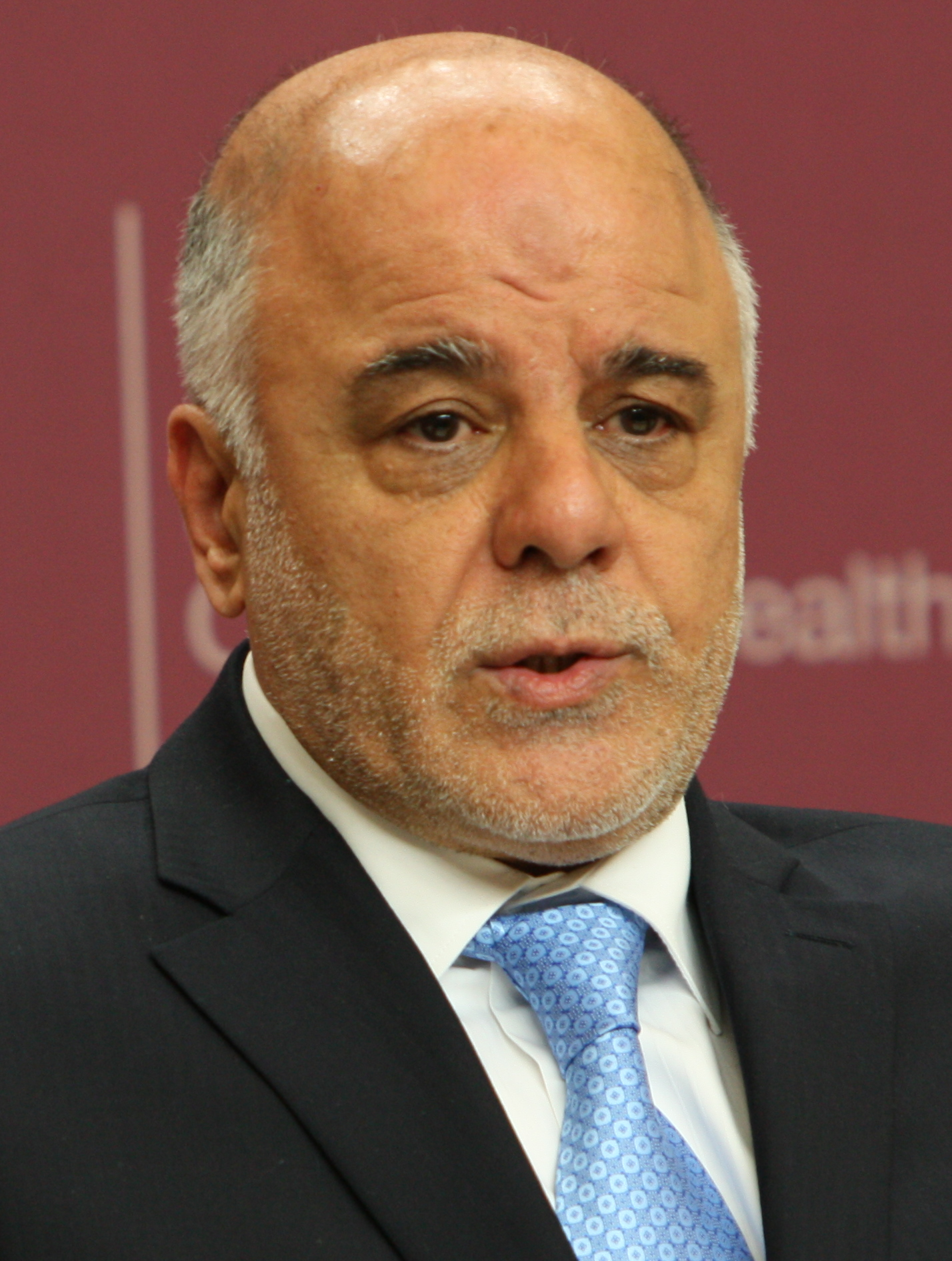
- Al-Abadi in 2015

Prime Minister of Iraq
- In office 8 September 2014 – 25 October 2018
- President: Fuad Masum; Barham Salih
- Deputy: Saleh al-Mutlaq; Baha Araji; Hoshyar Zebari; Rowsch Shaways
- Preceded by: Nouri al-Maliki
- Succeeded by: Adil Abdul-Mahdi

Leader of the Victory Alliance
- Incumbent
- Assumed office 14 December 2017
- Preceded by: Position established

Deputy Leader of the Islamic Dawa Party
- In office 15 January 2007 – 8 September 2014
- Preceded by: Nouri al-Maliki
- Succeeded by: Baha Araji

Minister of Communications
- In office 1 September 2003 – 1 June 2004
- Prime Minister: Iraqi Governing Council
- Preceded by: Muhammad Saeed al-Sahhaf
- Succeeded by: Muhammad Ali Hakim

Personal details
- Born: Haider Jawad Kadhim al-Abadi; 25 April 1952 (age 74) Baghdad, Kingdom of Iraq
- Citizenship: Iraq, United Kingdom
- Party: Victory Alliance
- Other political affiliations: Islamic Dawa
- Children: 3
- Education: University of Technology; University of Manchester
- Profession: Politician
- Website: t.me/HaiderAlAbadi

Haider Jawad Kadhim al-Abadi (Arabic: حيدر جواد كاظم العبادي; born 25 April 1952) is an Iraqi politician who served as the prime minister from September 2014 until October 2018. Previously he served as minister of communications from 2003 to 2004, in the first government after Saddam Hussein was deposed.

He was designated as prime minister by President Fuad Masum on 11 August 2014 to succeed Nouri al-Maliki and was approved by the Iraqi parliament on 8 September 2014. Al-Abadi was included in Time magazine's 100 Most Influential People of 2018.

In office throughout the majority of the War in Iraq (2013–2017) which he announced victory against ISIL, he later left the office of Prime Minister in 2018, following rising domestic discontent and widespread violent protests.

== Early life and education ==
Al-Abadi was born in Baghdad to Shia parents with an Iraqi father and a Lebanese mother from Jbaa, Lebanon. His father was a member of the Baghdad Neurosurgery Hospital and Inspector General of the Iraqi Ministry of Health. He was forced to retire in 1979 due to disagreements with the Ba'athist regime, and was buried in the US after his death. Al-Abadi, who speaks English, graduated high school in 1970 from the Central High School (Arabic: الإعدادية المركزية) in Bagdad. In 1975, he earned a bachelor's degree in electrical engineering from the University of Technology in Baghdad. In 1980, he earned a PhD degree in electrical engineering from the University of Manchester.

== Career ==
Al-Abadi joined the Dawa Party in 1967. Two of his brothers were killed and one was put in prison 1980, 1981, and 1982 for belonging to the Dawa Party. In 1981, his third brother was arrested and spent 10 years in prison. In 1977, he became in charge of its organization in Britain. In 1979, he became a member of the party's executive leadership. In 1983, the government confiscated al-Abadi's passport for conspiring against Iraq's Ba'ath Party.

=== Exile ===
Al-Abadi remained in the UK, in voluntary exile, until the 2003 invasion of Iraq. His positions during this time included:

- Director general of a small design and development firm in London specialising in high-technology vertical and horizontal transportation (1993–2003)
- Consultant, in London, in matters relating to transportation (1987–2003)
- Research leader for a major modernization contract in London (1981–1986)

Al-Abadi was awarded a grant from the UK Department of Trade and Industry in 1998. While working in London in 2001 al-Abadi registered a patent relating to rapid transit systems.

=== Return to Iraq ===
In 2003, al-Abadi became skeptical of the Coalition Provisional Authority (CPA) privatization plan, proposing to Paul Bremer that they had to wait for a legitimate government to be formed. In October 2003, al-Abadi with all 25 of the interim Governing Council ministers protested to Paul Bremer and rejected the CPA's demand to privatize the state-owned companies and infrastructure prior to forming a legitimate government. The CPA, led by Bremer, fell out with al-Abadi and the Governing Council. The CPA worked around the Governing Council, forming a new government that remained beholden to the CPA to serve until the general elections, prompting more aggressive armed actions by insurgents against US-led coalition personnel.

While al-Abadi was Minister of Communications, the CPA awarded licenses to three mobile operators to cover all parts of Iraq. Despite being rendered nearly powerless by the CPA, Al-Abadi was not prepared to be a rubber stamp and introduced more conditions for the licenses. Among them that a sovereign Iraqi government has the power to amend or terminate the licenses and introduce a fourth national license, which caused some friction with the CPA. In 2003, press reports indicated Iraqi officials were under investigation over a questionable deal involving Orascom, an Egypt-based telecoms company, which in late 2003 was awarded a contract to provide a mobile network to central Iraq. Al-Abadi asserted that there was no illicit dealing in the completed awards. In 2004, it was revealed that these allegations were fabrications, and a US Department of Defense review found that telecommunications contracting had been illegally influenced in an unsuccessful effort led by disgraced US Deputy Undersecretary of Defense John A. Shaw and not by Iraqis.

Between January and December 2005, he served as an adviser to the Prime Minister of Iraq in the first elected government.

He was elected as a member of the Iraqi Parliament in the December 2005 parliamentary election and chaired the parliamentary committee for Economy, Investment and Reconstruction. Al-Abadi was re-elected in the 2010 parliamentary election as a member of the Iraqi Parliament representing Baghdad. In 2013, he chaired the Finance Committee and was at the center of a parliamentary dispute over the allocation of the 2013 Iraqi budget.

Al-Abadi's name was circulated as a prime ministerial candidate during the formation of the Iraqi government in 2006 during which time Ibrahim al-Jaafari was replaced by Nouri al-Maliki as prime minister.

In 2008, al-Abadi remained steadfast in his support of Iraqi sovereignty, insisting on specific conditions to the agreement with the U.S. regarding its presence in Iraq.

In 2009, al-Abadi was identified by the Middle East Economic Digest as a key person to watch in Iraq's reconstruction.

He is an active member of the Iraq Petroleum Advisory Committee, participating in the Iraq Petroleum Conferences of 2009–2012 organized by Nawar Abdulhadi and Phillip Clarke of The CWC Group.

He was one of several Iraqi politicians supporting a suit against Blackwater as a result of the 2010 dismissal of criminal charges against Blackwater personnel involved in the 2007 killing of 17 Iraqi civilians.

Al-Abadi was again tapped as a possible prime minister during the tough negotiations between Iraqi political blocs after the elections of 2010 to choose a replacement to incumbent PM Nouri al-Maliki. Again in 2014, he was nominated by Shia political parties as an alternative candidate for Prime Minister.

=== Prime Minister (2014–2018) ===
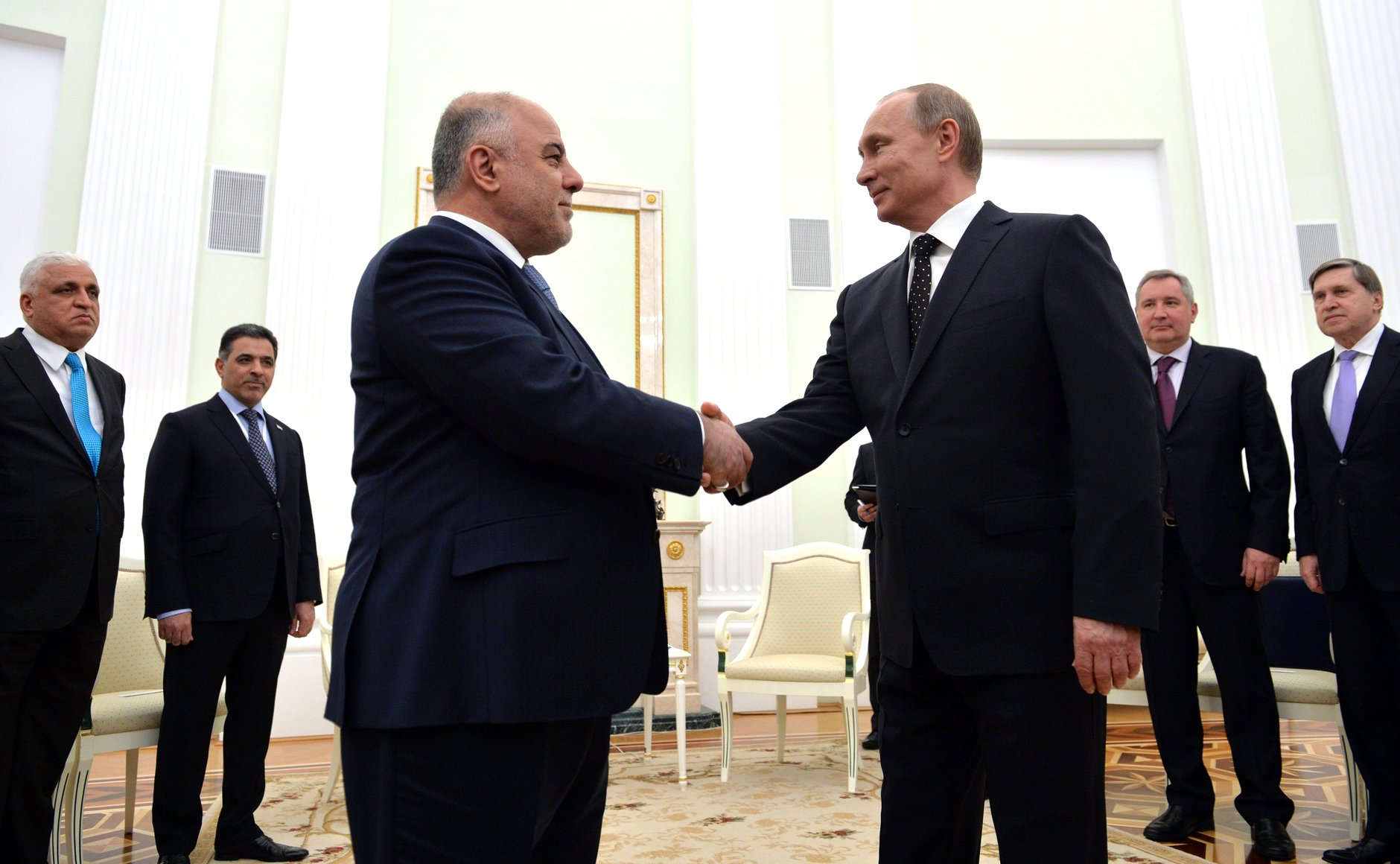
At a meeting with Russian President Vladimir Putin.

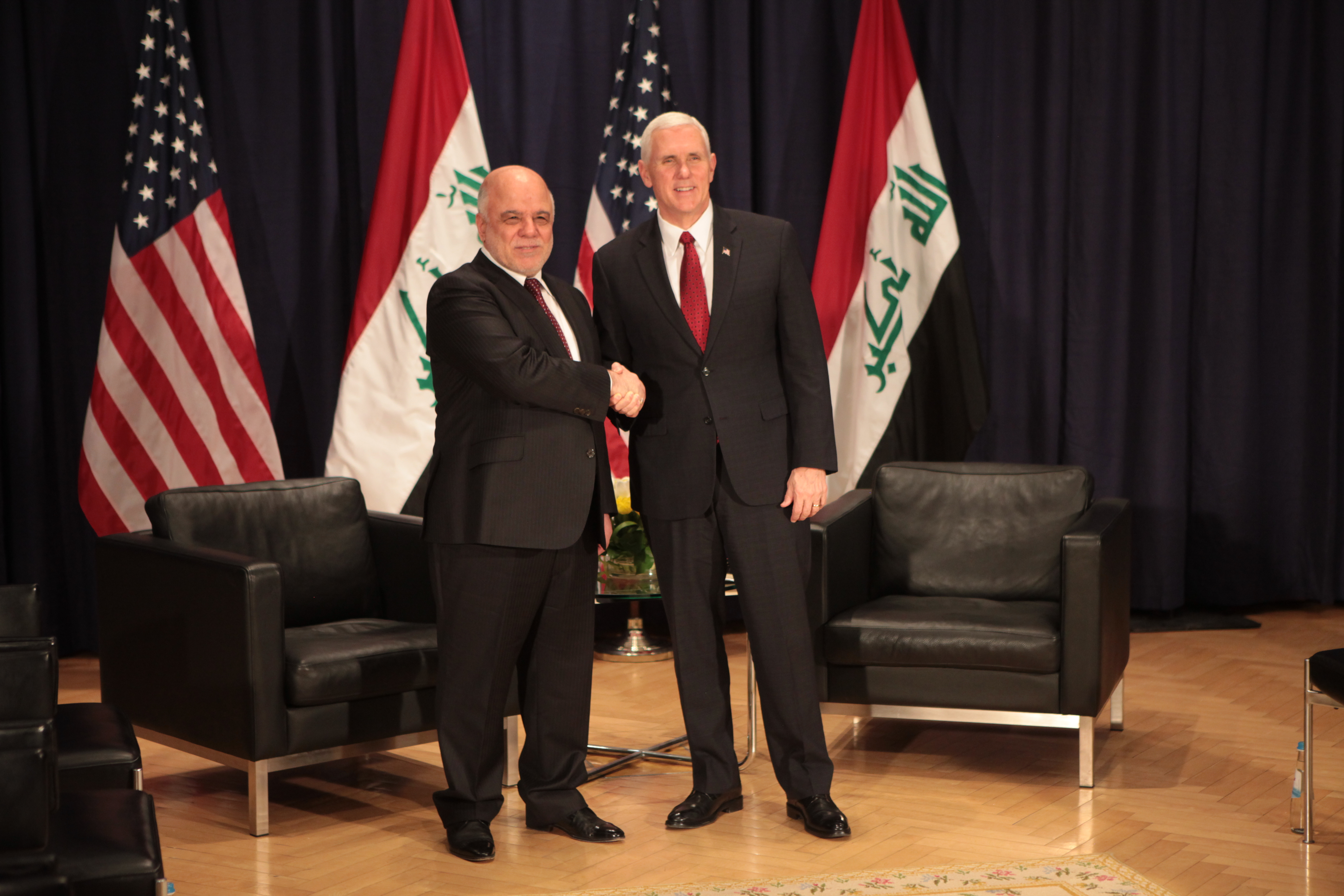
At a meeting with U.S. Vice President Mike Pence.

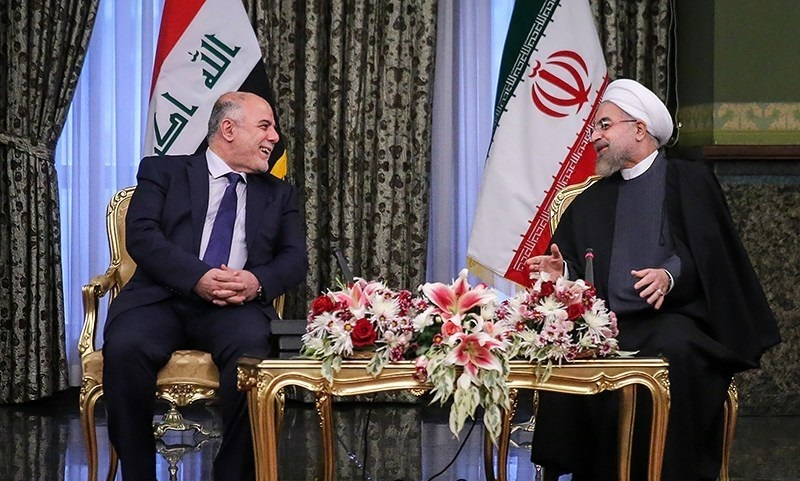
At a meeting with Iranian President Hassan Rouhani.

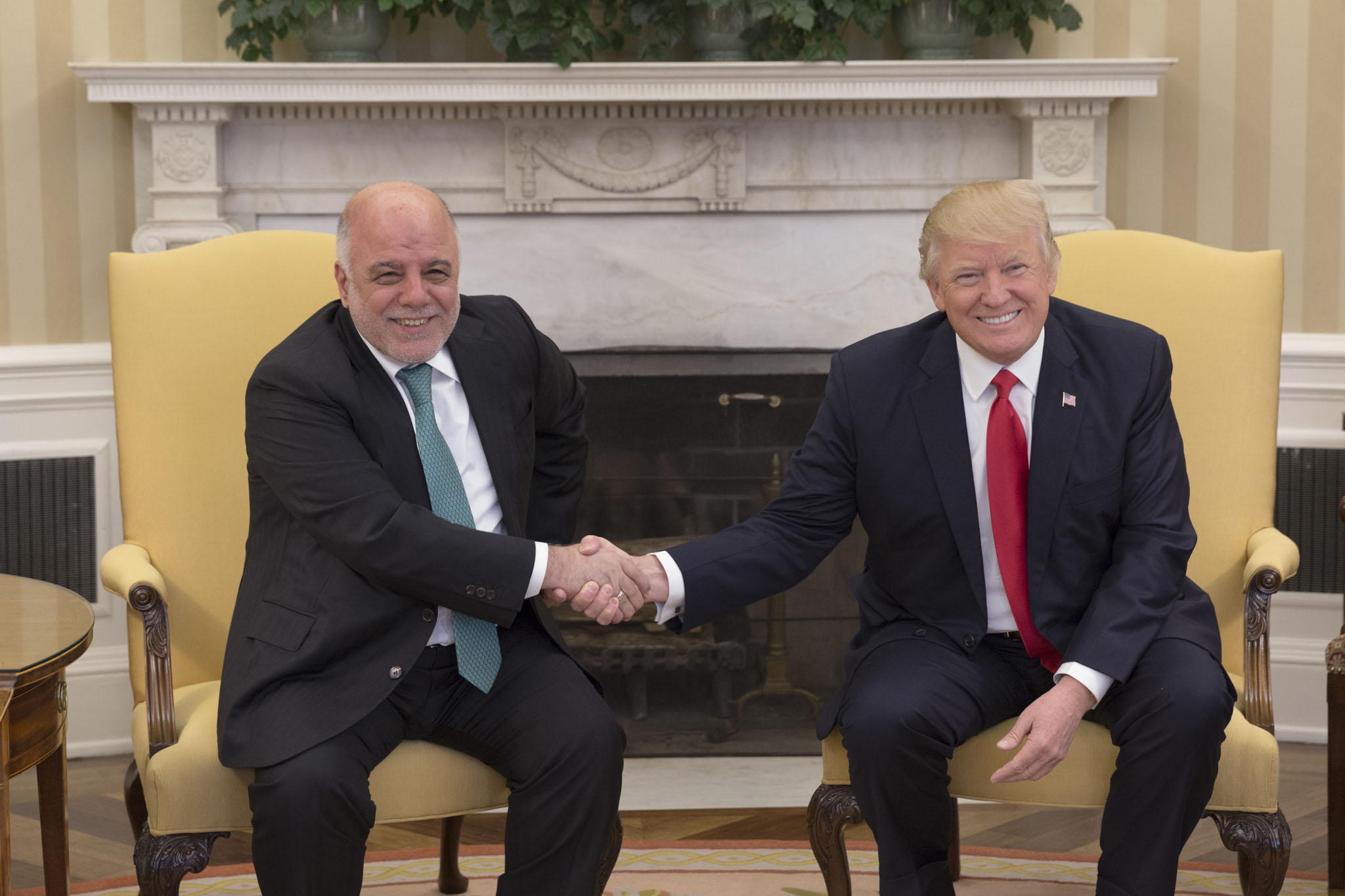
At a meeting with U.S. President Donald Trump.

On 24 July 2014, Fuad Masum became the new president of Iraq. He, in turn, nominated al-Abadi for prime minister on 11 August. For the appointment to take effect, al-Abadi was required to form a government to be confirmed by Parliament within 30 days. Al-Maliki, however, refused to give up his post and referred the matter to the federal court claiming the president's nomination was a "constitutional violation". He said, "The insistence on this until the end is to protect the state." On 14 August 2014, in the face of growing calls from world leaders and members of his own party, the embattled prime minister announced he was stepping down to make way for al-Abadi. The announcement of the leadership transition from al-Maliki to al-Abadi triggered a major realignment of Sunni Arab public opinion away from armed opposition groups and to the Iraqi government, since many Iraqi Sunni Arabs were optimistic that the new government would address their grievances and deliver public goods and services to them.

The Iraqi Parliament approved al-Abadi's new government and his presidential program on 8 September 2014. In the months after assuming office in September 2014, Abadi made determined efforts to increase Sunni participation in the Iraqi government. Abadi appointed Khaled al-Obaidi, a prominent Sunni politician from Mosul, as his Defense Minister, and the appointment was ratified by the Iraqi parliament after two months. In mid-December 2014, Abadi forged a new revenue-sharing agreement with the Kurds, under which Baghdad agreed to pay the Kurdish Regional Government one half of all income from Kurdish-controlled oil fields. To counter the widespread corruption in the army stemming from the Maliki years, Abadi announced that 50,000 "ghost soldiers" had been identified and would be removed from army payrolls. "Ghost soldiers" were men on army payrolls who never showed up for duty, but paid their officers part of their salaries, thus institutionalizing corruption and hollowing out the armed forces.

Iraqi President Fuad Masum paid a goodwill visit to Saudi Arabia in November 2014. In response, Saudi Arabia prepared to reopen its embassy in Baghdad, which had remained closed since the start of the Gulf War in 1990. Abadi also visited Egypt, Jordan, and Turkey to discuss regional strategies to combat militant Islamist forces. Four months into his tenure, Foreign Affairs magazine wrote that Abadi's attempts to resolve Iraq's sectarian strife had made his premiership "a welcome change from the schismatic style of his predecessor". As a result of Abadi's reforms, the United States pledged $1.5 billion to train Iraqi forces and announced the sale of F-16 fighter jets, suspended after the 2003 invasion of Iraq.

Combating political corruption was an early priority of the al-Abadi administration. In August 2015, al-Abadi unveiled a plan to strengthen the government by, among other things, eliminating security details for senior officials and cutting benefits to specific high-level officials.

Al-Abadi was forced to contend with the Islamic State as prime minister; he was sometimes critical of Barack Obama and the United States military response to the threat of IS. Furthermore, al-Abadi pivoted closer towards Russia and Iran in order to combat the threat of IS and encouraged cooperation between these nations on military operations in the region.

In April 2016, al-Abadi's difficulties in implementing political reforms led to the storming of the Iraqi parliament by supporters of Shia cleric Muqtada al-Sadr. The protesters breaching the Green Zone and disrupting the parliament were described as evidence of Iraq's increasingly dysfunctional political system and al-Abadi's problems in getting corruption under control.

On 9 December 2017, Al-Abadi announced victory over IS and the end of the Iraqi Civil War (2014-2017).

Abadi was succeeded by Adil Abdul-Mahdi on 25 October 2018.

Political offices
| Preceded by Muhammad Saeed al-Sahhaf as Minister of Information | Minister of Communications; 2003–2004 | Succeeded by Muhammad Ali Hakim |
| Preceded by Nouri al-Maliki | Prime Minister of Iraq; 2014–2018 | Succeeded by Adil Abdul-Mahdi |
Party political offices
| Preceded by Nouri al-Maliki | Deputy Leader of Islamic Dawa Party; 2007–2014 | Succeeded by Baha Araji |
