= Hasan Zaydan =

Iraqi politician

Hasan Zaydan is an Iraqi politician and a former member of the Iraqi National Assembly with the Iraqi National Dialogue Front.

He led the National Front for a Free and United Iraq, which joined with other Sunni Arab parties to form the Iraqi National Dialogue Front prior to the December 2005 elections.
