= Yonadam Kanna =

Assyrian Iraqi politician

Yonadam Yousip Kanna ܝܘܢܕܡ ܝܘܣܦ ܟܢܢܐ يُنادَم كنا
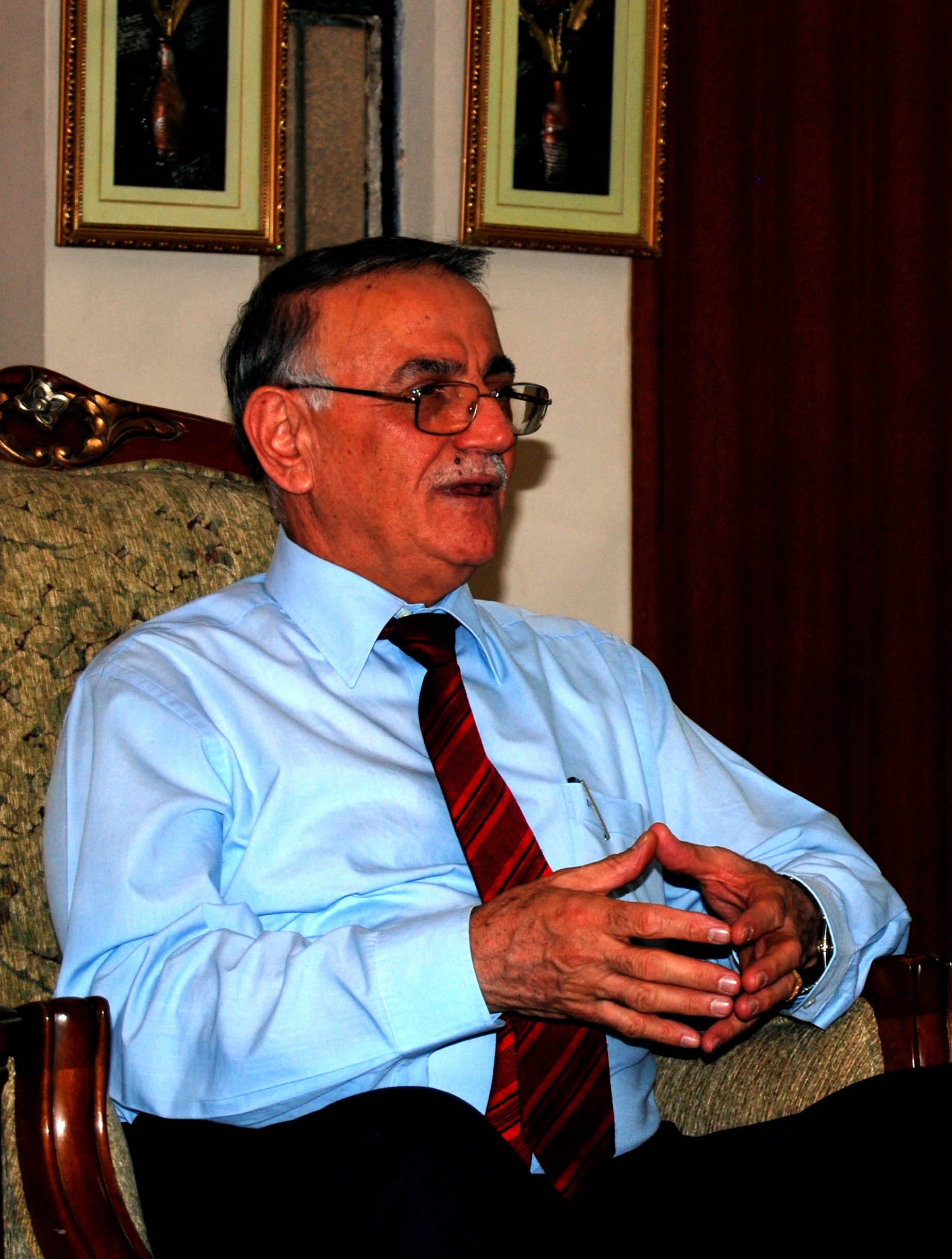
- Kanna in 2011

Council of Representatives of Iraq
- Incumbent
- Assumed office 30 January 2005

KRG Minister of Housing and Public Works
- In office 1992–1999

KRG Minister of Industry and Energy
- In office 1999–2001

Secretary-General of Assyrian Democratic Movement
- In office 2001–2023
- Succeeded by: Yacoob Yaco

Personal details
- Born: 1 January 1951 (age 75) Habbaniyah, Kingdom of Iraq (now Iraq)
- Party: Assyrian Democratic Movement
- Education: University of Sulaymaniyah

Yonadam Yousip Kanna (Syriac: ܝܘܢܕܡ ܝܘܣܦ ܟܢܢܐ, also known as Rabi Yacoub Yosep) is an Assyrian politician and the first Christian member of the Iraqi National Assembly since 2003. Kanna also served as the Secretary General of the Assyrian Democratic Movement from 2001 to 2023.

== Early life and education ==
Yonadam Yousip Kanna was born in Al-Anbar, Iraq in 1951. He completed his tertiary education at the University of Sulaymaniyah in 1975, graduating with a B.S. degree in Civil Engineering.

== Political career ==
=== Assyrian Democratic Movement ===
Yonadam Kanna is one of the founding members of the Assyrian Democratic Movement (ADM) and participated in the secret movement from its inception in 1979 until the 1991 uprisings in Iraq. In 1984, Kanna was sentenced to death in absentia by the Ba'ath led Iraqi government for participating in a group that opposed the Iraqi regime. Kanna was the former Secretary-General of the ADM after succeeding Ninos Pithyou in 2001 during the third congress of the ADM held in Erbil. In addition to leading the ADM, Kanna also heads the Al-Rafidain National List that participates in the Iraqi parliamentary elections.

=== Kurdistan Regional Government ===
Kanna is a former Kurdistan Regional Government minister who was appointed as a Minister of Housing and Public Works in KRG from 1992 to 1999 and later served as Minister of Industry and Energy from 1999 to 2001.

=== Iraq Government ===
Kanna was a founding member of the Iraqi Governing Council that was created following the Invasion of Iraq led by the United States in 2003. In the same year, Kanna held the position of Chairman of the 'Committee on Reconstruction and Public Services for the Chaldean Syriac Assyrian component'. In December 2004, Kanna was a member of the National Transitional Council and served as a chairman for Age and Public Services.

He was elected to the National Assembly of Iraq as head of the Al Rafideen National List in the January and December 2005 elections. During the same year, Kanna became a member of the Constitution Drafting Committee that developed the current Constitution of Iraq. From 2006 to 2010, Kanna was vice-chairman of the 'Economy, Investment and Reconstruction Committee'.

During the Iraqi parliamentary election, 2010, Kanna was one of five Christians elected into the Iraq National Assembly, continuing from his first term in 2005.

Kanna was re-elected for his third term during the Iraqi parliamentary election, 2014 claiming the Baghdad seat as part of the five seats in the Christian quota.

In 2015, Kanna pushed for an educational curriculum that prevents the "Daesh mentality" through widespread and in-depth education and cultural programs to address feelings of injustice and exclusion.

In addition to other Assyrian political figures, Kanna has pressured the Iraqi government to develop a self-governed province in the Nineveh Plains to be formed in the federal state of Iraq to protect minorities and allow them to govern their own communities.
