= Iraq Alliance =

Iraq Alliance (Etelaf Al-Iraq) ائتلاف العراق
- Chairman: Fadhel Al Dabbas
- Founded: 2013
- Dissolved: 2017
- Split from: Iraqi National Movement
- Ideology: Economic liberalism Nonsectarianism; Centrism; Moderation
- Political position: Centre-right
- Seats in the Council of Representatives: 0 / 328

Website
- Iraqfirst.org

The Iraq Alliance (Etelaf Al-Iraq), (list 262) is an Iraqi political coalition formed for the 2014 Iraqi parliamentary election by various liberal and pro-business figures.
