= Baha Araji =

Iraqi politician

Bahaa Al Araji
- بهاء الاعرجي

Deputy Prime Minister of Iraq
- In office 8 September 2014 – 10 August 2015 Serving with Saleh al-Mutlaq, Rowsch Shaways and Hoshyar Zebari
- President: Fuad Masum

Member of Iraqi parliament
- In office 22 April 2006 – 8 September 2014

Personal details
- Born: 1967 (age 58–59) Kadhimiya, Baghdad, Iraq
- Party: United Iraqi Alliance
- Children: 4
- Education: University of Baghdad
- Profession: Lawyer

Bahaa Araji (Arabic: بهاء الاعرجي) was a member of the Iraqi National Assembly until 2014. He served as Iraqi Deputy Prime Minister for Energy Affairs from September 2014 to August 2015. He is a spokesman for the United Iraqi Alliance.

He was a member of the committee that drafted the Constitution of Iraq.

During coalition negotiations in 2006 he strongly opposed the inclusion of Iyad Allawi's Iraqi National List in the government, saying they represented a red line drawn in blood.

== Personal life ==
Bahaa Al Araji was born in Kazimiyah, Baghdad, to a large family. He was the 5th oldest child of 11 to Hussein Al-Araji.

== Iraq parliamentary elections 2010 ==
Bahaa Al Araji stood in the 2010 Iraqi Parliamentary Elections for the Nasiriyah district as candidate no.2 for the National Iraqi Alliance. He won a seat in the new government formation with over 40,000 votes, becoming the most popular candidate in the Nasiriyah district.

He was nominated as one of the ten names on the Sadrist mock election ballot and received 5% of the votes, however the elections outcomes were discarded due to allegations of the voting being biased.

== Resignation ==
In August 2015, after his resignation and consecutive Deputy Prime Minister position abolishment by an Al Abadi Government reform, he was targeted by a probe for nine allegations including property racketeering and financial corruption. He was one of the most prominent official to be investigated in the fight against corruption in Iraq.

== Quotes ==
- "The Mahdi Army and the Sadrists represent a wide sect of the Iraqis and that is why Maliki should support them."
- "The people of Iraq are strong and will pull through everything in time."
