= Hareth Shanshal Sunaid =

Iraqi politician

Hareth Shanshal Talee'h Sunaid (Arabic: حارث شنشل طليع سنيد) is an Iraqi politician from the minority Mandaean faith (Arabic: الصابئة) and Member of the Council of Representatives of Iraq. He is the only MP from the Mandaean minority of Iraq sitting as an independent MP.

== Career ==
Shanshal took part in the 2014 Iraqi Parliamentary elections forming the electoral list #295 Hareth Shanshal Sunaid al-Harithi (Arabic: حارث شنشل سنيد الحارثي) being basically his candidature in 18 different Iraqi electoral districts, considering that the Mandaean seat (a reserved minority seat) would be voted for by electors in all governorates, contrary to general non-minority seats which would be voted per governorate basis.

Acquiring the biggest number of votes for Mandaean candidates, he was declared winner for the sole minority seat for Mandaeans in the Iraqi Parliament.
