= 2013 Diyala governorate election =

2013 Diyala Governorate election
← 2009	20 April 2013	2017 →

All 29 seats for the Diyala Governorate council
Governor of Diyala before election
Abdulnasir al-Muntasirbillah
Tawafuq
Subsequent Governor
TBD

The Diyala Governorate election of 2013 was held on 20 April 2013 alongside elections for all other governorates outside Iraqi Kurdistan, Kirkuk, Anbar, and Nineveh.

== Results ==
Summary of the 20 April 2013 Diyala Governorate election results
Party/Coalition	Allied national parties	Leader	Seats	Change	Votes
Diyala's National Alliance	State of Law Coalition; Citizens Alliance; Liberal Coalition	Nouri Al-Maliki; Ammar al-Hakim; Moqtada al-Sadr	12	▲7	170,292
Iraqi Diyala	Muttahidoon; Arabian Al Iraqia	Usama al-Nujayfi; Saleh al-Mutlaq	10	▼5	149,535
Brotherhood and Coexistence Alliance List	KDP; PUK		3	▼4	49,415
Al Iraqia National and United Coalition		Ayad Allawi	2	▼1	27,670
Determined to Build		Mizhir Taha Hamad Mohamed	1		17,935
Diyala's New Coalition		Saleh Birsim Khalil Ibrahim	1		13,980
Diyala's Loyal Sons' Bloc		Suhad Ismael Abdul Rahim Saleh			6,053
Iraq's Benevolence and Generosity List					4,510
Diyala's Will Coalition		Adnan Abdul Karim Abed Ali Omran			3,846
Iraqi Commission of Independent Civil Society Organizations		Bassel Abdul Wahab Mohammad Hussain			3,546
New Generation Bloc		Zuhair Nawruz Darwish Mahmud Hassan			2,963
Arabs' Frontier		Jawad Kathem Hamad Latif			2,851
Hazem Mustafa Ismael Isa Al Biyati	Independent				2,393
Free Iraqi Coalition		Zeid Abed Tayeh Abawi			2,133
The Advocate's Party		Saad Jasem Naser Hussein			913
Law Advocate Knights' Bloc					749
National White Bloc		Saad Abdullah Hamud Thamer			527
Total			29		459,311
Sources: al-Sumaria - Diyala Coalitions, ISW, IHEC
