= Fuad Masum =

President of Iraq from 2014 to 2018

- فوئاد مەعسووم فؤاد معصوم
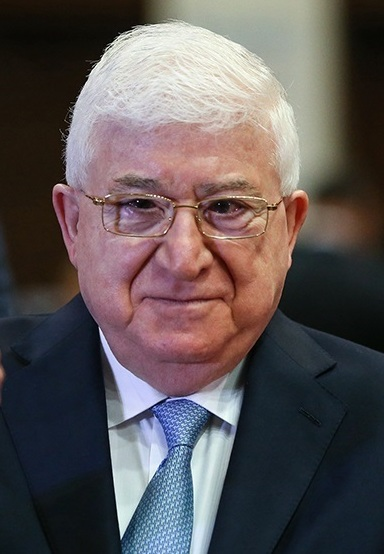
- Masum in 2018

7th President of Iraq
- In office 24 July 2014 – 2 October 2018
- Prime Minister: Nouri al-Maliki; Haider al-Abadi
- Vice President: Khodair al-Khozaei; Nouri al-Maliki; Osama al-Nujaifi; Ayad Alawi
- Preceded by: Jalal Talabani
- Succeeded by: Barham Salih

Speaker of the Council of Representatives Acting
- In office 14 June 2010 – 11 November 2010
- President: Jalal Talabani
- Preceded by: Ayad al-Samarrai
- Succeeded by: Osama al-Nujaifi

1st Prime Minister of Kurdistan Region (PUK-controlled part)
- In office 4 July 1992 – 26 April 1994
- President: Saddam Hussein
- Preceded by: Position established
- Succeeded by: Kosrat Rasul Ali

Personal details
- Born: 1 July 1938 (age 88) Koya, Kingdom of Iraq
- Party: Patriotic Union of Kurdistan (1974–present)
- Other political affiliations: Iraqi Communist Party (1962–1964); Kurdistan Democratic Party (1964–1974)
- Spouse: Rounak Abdulwahid Mustafa (m. 1968; died 2023)
- Children: 6; including Juwan
- Education: University of Baghdad; Al-Azhar University
- Religion: Sunni Islam
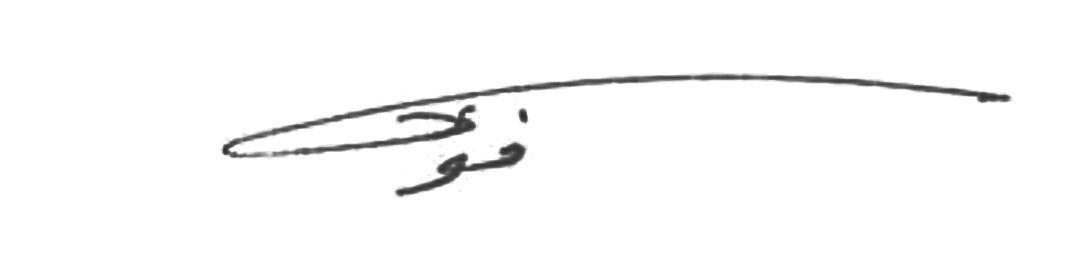
- Signature

Muhammad Fuad Masum Hurami (Arabic: محمد فؤاد معصوم, romanized: Muḥammad Fū’ād Ma‘ṣūm; Kurdish: محەممەد فوئاد مەعسووم هەورامی, born 1 July 1938) is an Iraqi Kurdish politician who served as the president of Iraq from 24 July 2014 to 2 October 2018. He was elected as president following the 2014 parliamentary election. Masum is the second non-Arab president of Iraq, succeeding Jalal Talabani, also Kurdish, and was a confidant of Talabani.

== Early life and education ==
Fuad Masum was born in the city of Koya. He is the son of Mullah Masum Khider, a former head of the Association of Muslim Scholars in Kurdistan, who belongs to an established political dynasty with Muslim clerical links. His family descends from the village of Khabanen, which is part of Hawraman. He studied at various religious schools in Iraqi Kurdistan until the age of 18. He studied law and Sharia at Baghdad University. In 1958, Masum traveled to Cairo to complete his higher education at Al-Azhar University. He worked as a professor in Basrah University in 1968. He earned his PhD in Islamic philosophy from Al-Azhar in 1975.

== Political career ==
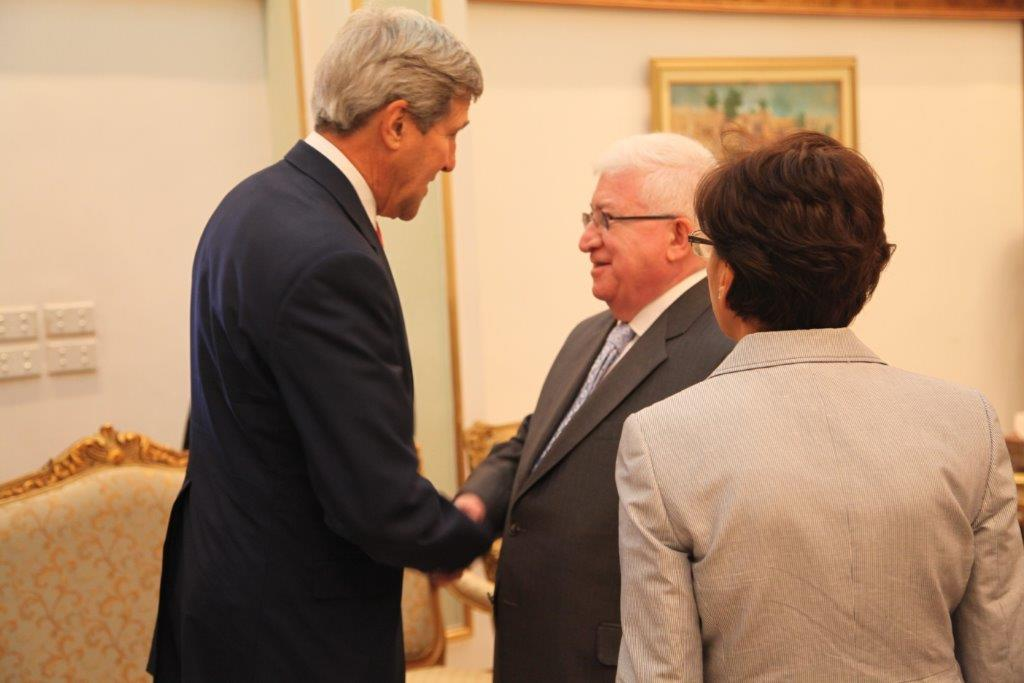
Masum with US Secretary of State John Kerry at the United Nations headquarters, New York City (September 2014)

=== Communist Party ===
Masum joined the Iraqi Communist Party in 1962, until 1964, where he travelled to Syria to meet the Communist Party secretary there, Khalid Bakdash. After Masum discovered Bakdash's attitudes against the Kurds, he quit the party to join the Kurdistan Democratic Party (PDK).

=== Kurdistan Democratic Party ===
In 1968, Masum was the PDK representative in Basra. He was also the representative of the Kurdish Revolution in Cairo until 1975.

=== Patriotic Union of Kurdistan ===
Masum was one of the founders of the Patriotic Union of Kurdistan (PUK) in 1976. By 1992, he was the first Prime Minister of Kurdistan Region. In 2003, following the invasion of Iraq, Masum returned to Baghdad to be a member of the delegation representing Kurdistan, and was a member of the constitution drafting committee. In 2010, Masum became the first Speaker of the Council of Representatives.

=== Presidency ===
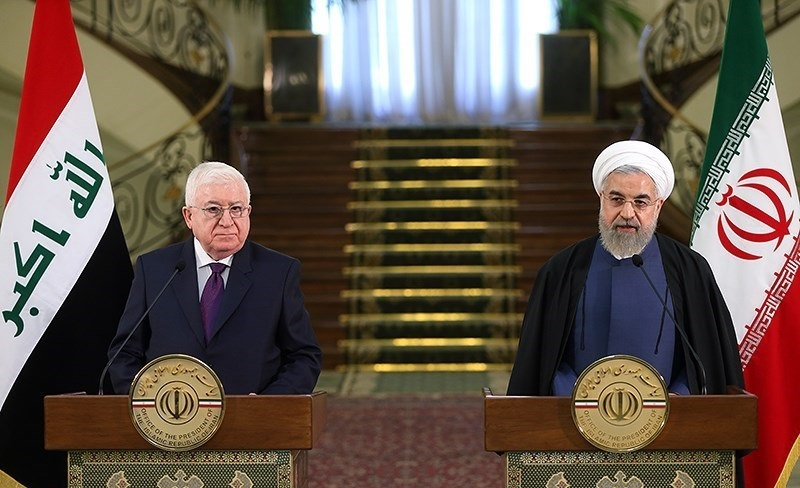
Masum with Iranian President Hassan Rouhani in Saadabad Palace

In 2014, he was elected by the parliament representatives as the seventh president of Iraq. Masum won 211 votes while his closest competitor, Barham Salih, only received 17. The decision was made during a secret vote of Kurdish MPs, who traditionally have control over the presidency for the sake of political balance. United Nations Secretary-General Ban Ki-moon was present in Iraq when the decision was made, meeting with Prime Minister Nouri al-Maliki about the need for a more inclusive government. Masum accepted the position, noting the "huge security, political and economic tasks" he faces as president.

On 26 August, Masum appointed a new prime minister, Haider al-Abadi. His appointment was considered illegal by Nouri al-Maliki and in violation of the constitution. Maliki said that in spite of his erosion of power it was his duty to remain in power because the appointment was a conspiracy rooted from outside of Iraq. Al-Maliki referred the matter to the federal court claiming, "the insistence on this until the end is to protect the state." However, on 14 August 2014, in the face of growing calls from world leaders and members of his own party, Maliki announced he was stepping down, paving the way for al-Abadi to take over.

== Personal life ==
Masum married to Rounak Abdulwahid Mustafa (1940–2023) in 1968, and has five daughters: Shireen (b. 1970), Juwan (b. 1972), Zozan (b. 1977), Shilan (b. 1979) and Veian (b. 1982). He had a son, Showan (1974–1988), who died from a childhood illness.

Political offices
| New office | Prime Minister of Kurdistan Region; 1992–1993 | Succeeded by Kosrat Rasul Ali |
| Preceded by Ayad al-Samarrai | Speaker of the Council of Representatives; 2010 | Succeeded by Usama al-Nujayfi |
| Preceded by Jalal Talabani | President of Iraq; 2014–2018 | Succeeded by Barham Salih |
