= Iraqi National Dialogue Front =

Iraqi National Dialogue Front الجبهة العراقية للحوار الوطني
- Leader: Saleh al-Mutlaq
- Founded: 2005
- Ideology: Iraqi nationalism National conservatism
- Political position: Right-wing
- Seats in the Council of Representatives of Iraq: 0 / 328
- Seats in the local governorate councils: 0 / 440

The Iraqi Front for National Dialogue (Arabic: الجبهة العراقية للحوار الوطني al-Jabha al-Iraqia li al-Hiwar al-Watani) also known as Hiwar is an Iraqi Sunni Arab-led Iraqi political party.

Originally formed to contest the December 2005 elections, it described itself as a non-sectarian coalition that wants to end the presence of foreign troops and to rebuild government institutions.

The main components were initially:

- The Iraqi National Front, led by former Minister of State Saleh al-Mutlaq, who was the chief Sunni Arab negotiator for the constitution
- The National Front for a Free and United Iraq of Hassan Zaydan
- The Iraqi Christian Democratic Party of Minas al-Yusufi
- The Democratic Arab Front of Farhan al-Sudayd
- The Sons of Iraq Movement of Ali al-Suhayri

The coalition included Arabs, Kurds, Assyrians, Yezidis and Shabaks.

Mutlaq campaigned against the constitution in the October 2005 referendum, and refused to join the other main Sunni Arab-led list, Iraqi Accord Front because that group's largest component, the Iraqi Islamic Party, had backed the new constitution, which Mutlaq rejected due to it granting federalism and autonomy to different regions, and also because it did not emphasise Iraq's Arab identity.

The Front performed relatively well in the December 2005 election, winning 11 seats, but complained of widespread electoral fraud and called for a re-run of the poll.

Prior to the 2010 Iraqi Elections it joined the secular Iraqiyya coalition and was allocated 16 out of their 91 seats in the Council of Representatives of Iraq, becoming the biggest individual party with a Sunni Arab majority.
