= Saleh al-Mutlaq =

Iraqi politician (born 1947)

Saleh Muhammed al-Mutlaq
- صالح المطلك
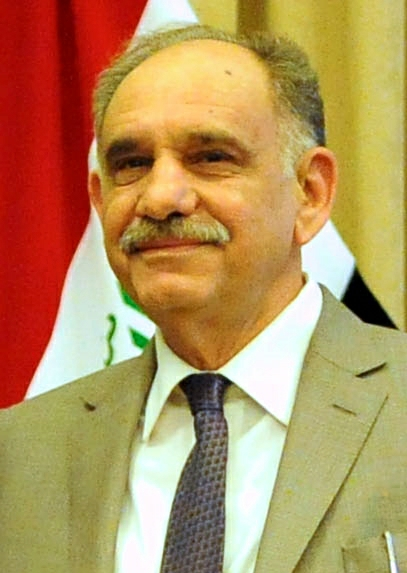

Deputy Prime Minister of Iraq
- In office 21 December 2010 – 11 August 2015 Serving with Hussain al-Shahristani, Rowsch Shaways, Hoshyar Zebari and Baha Araji
- Prime Minister: Nouri al-Maliki; Haider al-Abadi
- Preceded by: Rafi al-Issawi
- Succeeded by: Thamir Ghadhban

Personal details
- Born: 1 July 1947 (age 79) Fallujah, Kingdom of Iraq
- Party: Ba'ath Party (?–1977); Iraqi National Dialogue Front (2005–2014); Al-Arabiya Coalition (2014–present)
- Education: University of Baghdad; University of Aberdeen
- Website: t.me/saeehbot

Saleh Muhammed al-Mutlaq (Arabic: صالح محمد المطلك; born 1 July 1947) is an Iraqi politician who is the head of the Iraqi Front for National Dialogue, the fifth largest political list in Iraq's parliament. From 21 December 2010 to 11 August 2015, he was one of the three deputy prime ministers of Iraq.

== Early life and education ==
Al-Mutlaq was born in Fallujah into the Jubur Tribe on 1 July 1947. He attended school in Habbaniyah, and went on to graduate from the University of Baghdad in 1968. He later completed his PhD at the University of Aberdeen, graduating in 1974.

== Politics ==
Mutlaq was an active member of the Ba'ath Party, but was expelled in 1977 after criticizing the government and insisting that 5 Shiite men accused of plotting against the state should receive a fair trial. Mutlaq then pursued a successful career in farming, before returning to politics after the 2003 invasion of Iraq, being appointed to the committee tasked with writing a new constitution. Mutlaq however voted against the new constitution due to the provision which outlawed the Ba'ath Party.

Mutlaq later joined the Iraqi Front for National Dialogue, a Sunni Arab-led Iraqi political list formed to contest the December 2005 elections. The Front alleges it is not sectarian. Mutlaq told Al Arabiya television "The majority of the National Dialogue Council insists that the list is a national list that includes Iraqis from Al-Basrah to Al-Sulaymaniyyah."

The Front platform calls an end to the presence of foreign troops and to rebuild government institutions. It also plans to focus on Iraq's economic and security problems. Its main components are the Iraqi National Front, the National Front for a Free and United Iraq and the Iraqi Christian Democratic Party of Minas.

The Front performed relatively well in the December 2005 election, winning 11 seats, but complained of widespread electoral fraud and called for a re-run of the poll. Western observers and the United Nations said the poll was largely free and fair.

According to BBC World News, Mutlaq wants all sects and ethnic groups to set aside their differences.

Mutlaq was appointed as a Deputy Prime Minister of Iraq alongside Hussain al-Shahristani under Prime Minister of Iraq Nouri al-Maliki. He was reappointed as the Deputy Prime Minister alongside Hoshyar Zebari and Baha Araji under the government of new Prime Minister Haider al-Abadi. He was removed from office on 11 August 2015 by the Iraqi parliament which also voted to remove the three posts of deputy prime ministers and vice presidents.

== Personal life ==
Mutlaq and his family have been subjected to threats and violence, with his brother being kidnapped and murdered following the 2005 elections, and several of his bodyguards also having been murdered. As a result of this his wife and son live in Amman, Jordan.
