= 2nd Corps (Iraq) =

Corps in the Iraqi Army

The 2nd Corps was a corps of the Iraqi Army, established before the Iran-Iraq War. It was initially located in the central regions of Iraq.

According to British military attaches' reports in 1977–78, the corps comprised the 3rd Armoured Division (Baiji/Tikrit), the 6th Armoured Division (Baqubah), and the 10th Armoured Division (Taji).

The 17th Armoured Division was in the field in the 2nd Corps sector in 1982–84 south of Khanaqin on the Iran-Iraq border; 2nd Corps was at that point headquartered at Baqubah. One of the division's early commanders was Brigadier General Saber 'Abd al-'Aziz. A later map in Malovany's book shows the 17th Armoured Division deployed between Tursaq and Zirbatiya, responsible to HQ 2nd Corps, almost directly east of Baghdad, circa September 1985.

In 1997, the corps had its headquarters at Diyala and controlled the 3rd Armoured Division (6th Armoured Brigade; 12th Armoured Brigade; 8th Mech Brigade) as well as the 15th (HQ Amerli) and 34th Infantry Divisions (90th, 502nd, 504th Brigades).

In the lead up to the 2003 invasion of Iraq, 2nd corps included the 3rd Armoured Division, and 15th and 34th Infantry Divisions. Along with the remainder of the Army, it was formally disband after the fall of Saddam Hussein in line with Coalition Provisional Authority Order 2.

== See also ==
- Operation Kheibar

== External links and further reading ==
- Saddam's War: An Iraqi Military Perspective of the Iran-Iraq War - ndupress.ndu.edu/Portals/68/Documents/Books/saddams-war.pdf
- Stephen T. Hosmer, "Why the Iraqi Resistance to the Coalition Invasion Was So Weak", RAND, 2007 Santa Monica, CA; Arlington, VA; Pittsburgh, PA. http://www.jstor.org/stable/10.7249/mg544af.
- "II Corps". www.globalsecurity.org.
