= 15th Infantry Division (Iraq) =

15th Infantry Division فرقة المشاة ال15
- Active: 1990s; 2015–present
- Country: Iraq
- Branch: Iraqi Army
- Type: Infantry
- Size: Division
- Engagements: Iraqi Civil War (2014–2017) Battle of Mosul (2016–2017) Battle of Tal Afar (2017) 2017 Iraqi–Kurdish conflict

The 15th Infantry Division is a division of the Iraqi Army. It was established in November 2015, The troops were initially trained by Iraqi trainers for 6 months and then the troops entered in training sessions for a further 6 months under the coalition forces at Camp Taji. The division is considered one of the strongest divisions in the ground forces in terms of training, equipping and arming

The division was first established under the rule of Saddam Hussein. In 1997, the 2nd Corps had its headquarters at Diyala and controlled the 3rd Armoured Division as well as the 15th Infantry Division (HQ Amerli) and 34th Infantry Division.

== Structure ==
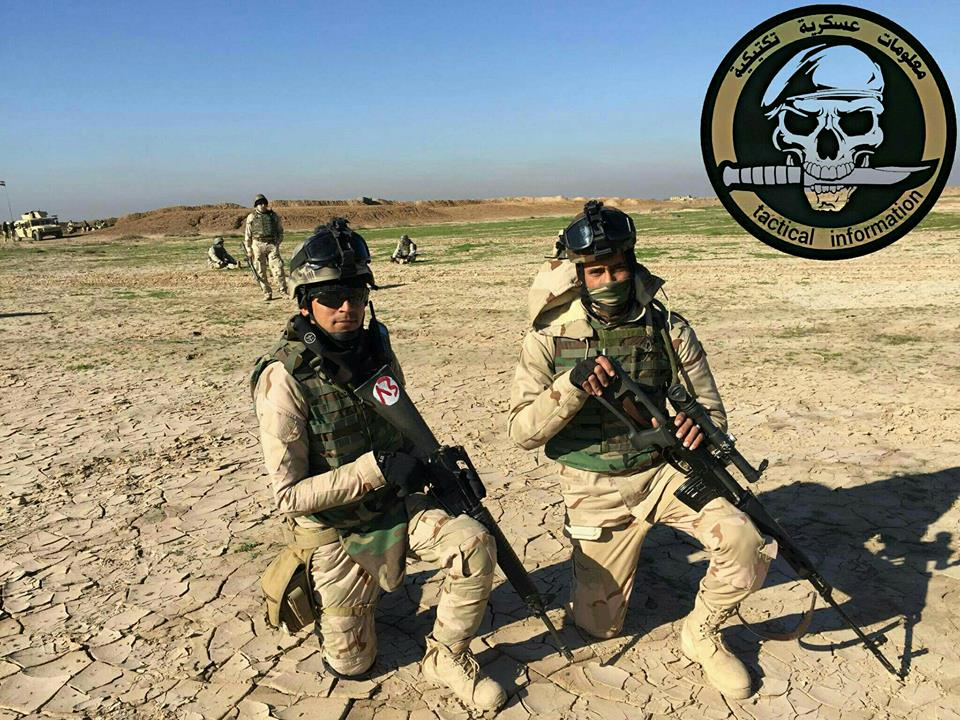
A soldier from the sniper platoon

The division currently consists of four Brigades:

- 71st Infantry Brigade
- 72nd Infantry Brigade
- 73rd Infantry Brigade
- 91st Infantry Brigade

The brigade consists of three regiments with one commando regiment, each of which consists of four companies. The company consists of four platoons with a support platoon. The platoon consists to three squads. The squad consists to two fireteams. The Division also includes an artillery battalion (light and heavy) with the field engineering battalion. Each regiment has a sniper platoon.

== Equipment ==
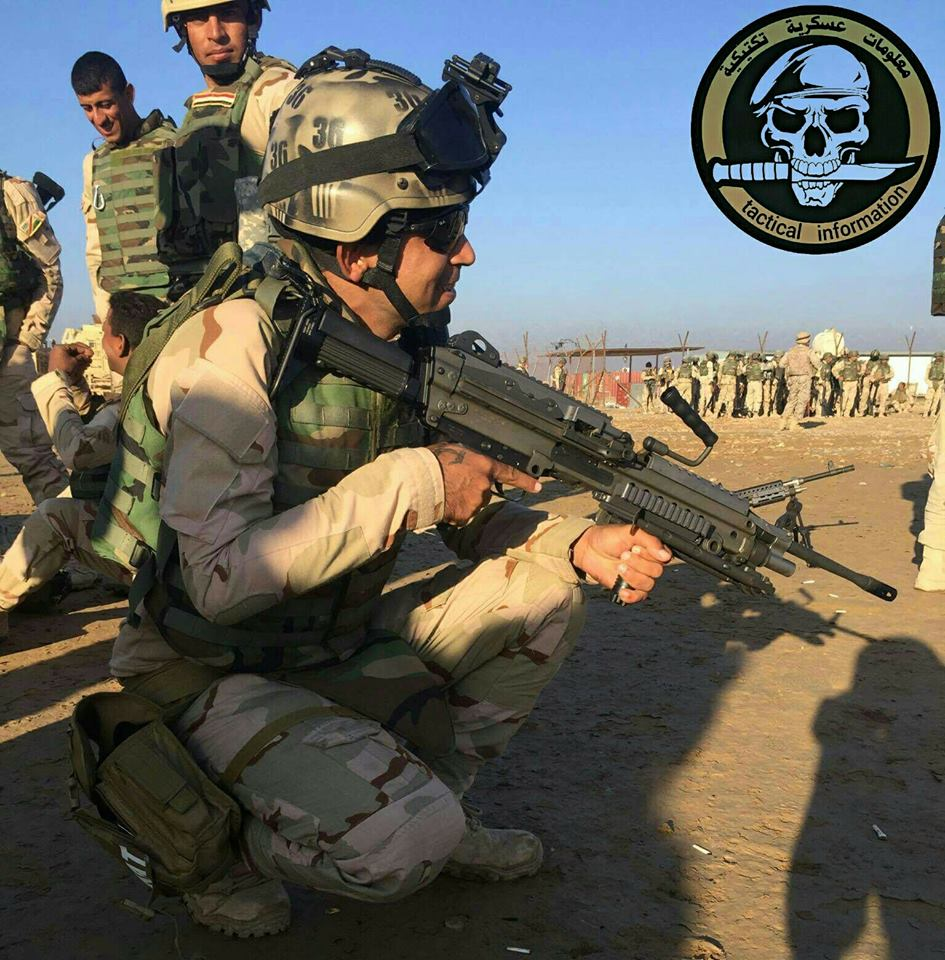
Iraqi soldier of 15th division carrying M249

=== Individual armament of fighters ===
They were initially equipped with AK-47 rifles, 7.62 mm PKC rifles, 7.62mm RPK rifles, RPG-7 launchers and 12.7 mm Dushka machine guns. After a period of time, their weapons were updated to the latest weapons, which were M-16 rifles and S56 M-249 revolvers Mm, M-240 7.62 mm and AT-3 mortars with heavy M-2 Browning 12.7 mm machine guns and 40 mm MK-19 assault rifles.

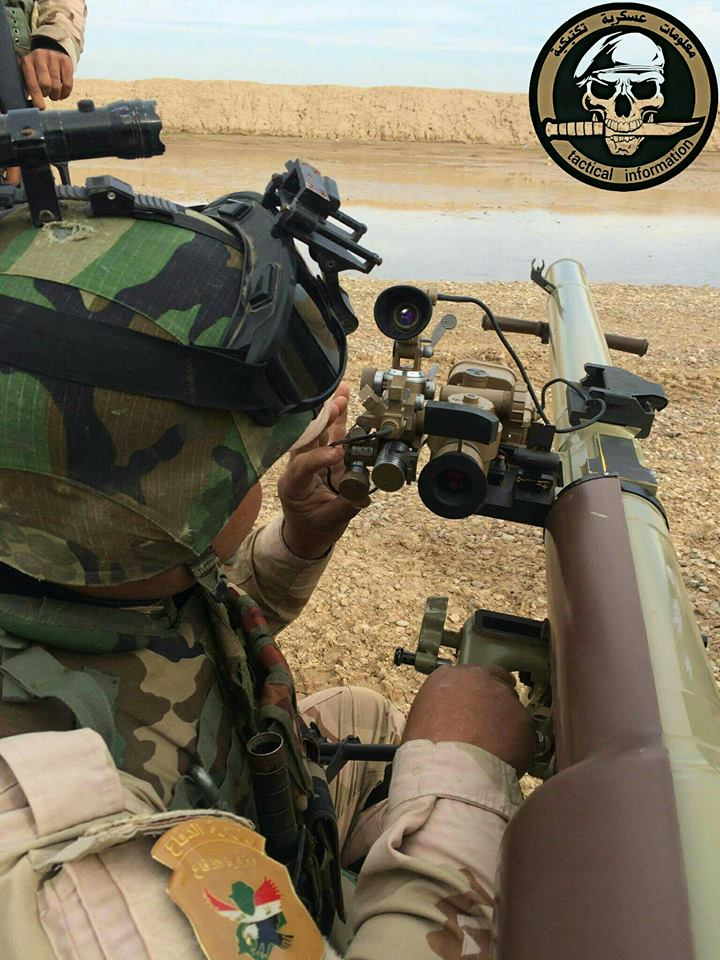
A soldier carrying a SPG-9 Anti-tank gun

The division also operate 60mm, 81mm and 120mm mortars. It is demonstrated in every company in the division and there is also SPG-9. They are equipped with Improved Outer Tactical Vests and very modern helmets such as MICH-2000/2001 helmets, various helmets, combat bags and other individual equipment.

The division is equipped with Mine-resistant ambush-protected (MRAP) vehicles, such as the Armor MAXPRO, CAIMAN, and the latest version of the Humvee.

== Combat history ==
The first battle the division participated in is the battle to liberate Al-Hamra camp in the Nabai area in 2015 and also the recent battles of Mosul and later participated in the liberation of Tal Afar and took part in Iraqi–Kurdish conflict.
