= 17th Division (Iraq) =

17th Division 17الفرقة المدرعة ال
- Active: 1983; 43 years ago
- Country: Iraq
- Branch: Iraqi Ground Forces Command
- Type: Armoured
- Size: Division
- Engagements: Battle of Mosul (2016–2017) Battle of Tal Afar (2017) 2017 Iraqi–Kurdish conflict

The 17th Division is a division of the Iraqi Army, active before and after 2003.

The 17th Armored Division was established after the beginning of the Iran–Iraq War, by the end of the third year of the war (September 1983). Brigadier General Iyad Futaykh Khalifa al-Rawi 'completed the setting up' of the division. It was in the field in the 2nd Corps sector in 1982–1984 south of Khanaqin on the Iran–Iraq border; 2nd Corps was at that point headquartered at Baqubah. One of its early commanders, possibly its first commander, was Brigadier General Saber 'Abd al-'Aziz. A later map in Malovany's book shows the division deployed between Tursaq and Zirbatiya, under 2nd Corps almost directly east of Baghdad, until circa September 1985.

It may have been in the 9th Corps during the Gulf War of 1991.

Saddam Hussein's After 2003, its headquarters was reported to be at Mahmadiyah, and its commander Staff Maj. Gen. Ali Jassam Mohammad. "In August 2008, the newly selected commanding general of the newly formed 17th IA division was a well-regarded, competent brigade commander—a good choice." Up until about mid-2014, the 17th Division was made up of a Headquarters and Service Company, the 23rd, 25th, and 55th Brigades, and the 17th Motor Transportation Regiment

Ricklefs wrote in October 2017 that the "17th Division appears to have performed well in southern Ninewa."

As of December 2017 it included the 23rd, 25th, 55th, and 60th Brigades as part of the Mid-Euphrates Operational Command.
