= Jordanian campaign (1967) =

Israeli victory in the Six-Day War

- Part of the Six-Day War
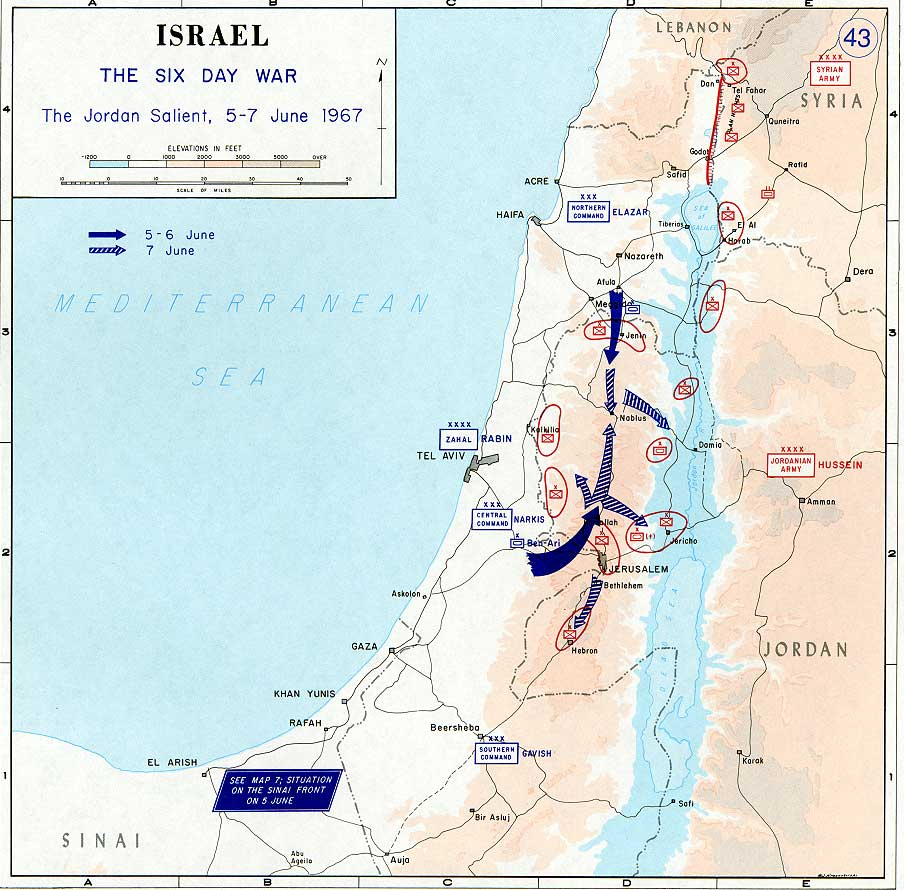
- The Jordan salient. June 5–7
Date	6–7 June 1967
Location	West Bank
Result	Israeli victory: Total Jordanian and Iraqi defeat
Territorial changes	Israel seizes the West Bank, including East Jerusalem

Belligerents
Israel	Jordan; Iraq

Commanders and leaders
(Israel) Uzi Narkiss (Israel) Moshe Dayan	(Jordan) King Hussein

Casualties and losses
288 killed, 2,400 wounded	Jordan: 700 killed, 6,000 wounded and missing, 550 captured Iraq: 10 killed, 30 wounded

The Jordanian campaign of 1967 was part of the broader Six-Day War, in which Israel defeated Egypt, Syria, Jordan, and Iraq. For Israel, it was the most significant part of the war, as it resulted in the capture of many Jewish monuments by the Israelis.

== Background ==
On 5 June 1967, Israel launched Operation Focus, in which the Israeli Air Force almost annihilated the air force of Egypt. After defeating Egypt in desert combat, which took place in Egypt's Sinai Peninsula, Israel then turned its attention to Jordan, which had launched an attack on Israel in aid of Egypt.

== Battle ==
King Hussein of Jordan had not only Jordanian troops but also a force of Iraqi commandos to assist him in the defense. Israel's objective was to capture East Jerusalem, then under Jordanian administration. The main battle was in Jerusalem. Fighting also raged in other areas of the West Bank, where Iraqi commandos and Jordanian soldiers defended their positions. The Jordanians fought from their bunkers and strongpoints, and had to be dislodged by the Israelis. The Battle of Ammunition Hill was one of the fiercest battles of the war, in which a force of Israeli troops faced Jordanian soldiers on a hill in East Jerusalem; 71 Jordanians and 36 Israelis were killed. Israeli troops also seized Bethlehem. Israeli troops moved behind tanks and left holy sites untouched. Forty Jordanian defenders were killed, and the remainder retreated. The Israelis pushed into Jerusalem. They engaged in urban warfare in Jerusalem, aiming to reach the Old City of Jerusalem. Mandelbaum Gate was the first major objective. The Israelis ran into a camouflaged firing post, which brought down every soldier who tried to break through. A tank finally neutralized the enemy position. After the gate was breached, the next objectives were the Damascus Gate and the Rockefeller Museum. These were captured. In hand-to-hand fighting, Israeli troops broke into the old city. The Israeli high command issued the order to use no armor in the old city. This resulted in heavier casualties, but the Israelis were concerned that many Jewish relics and monuments would be destroyed. The Israelis eventually took the Old City and could once again pray at the Western Wall, the first time in 19 years.

== Aftermath ==
Seven hundred Jordanian and ten Iraqis were killed and 2,500 Jordanians and 30 Iraqis were wounded, whilst 550 Israelis had been killed, and 2,400 wounded. The Israelis moved on to the mountainous Golan Heights, then under Syrian control. After mountain fighting with Syrian troops, the Israelis took the Golan Heights.
