= Fall of Mosul =

Battle in June 2014 during which ISIL seized control of the city

Coordinates: 36.3372°N 43.1358°E

- Part of the War in Iraq (2013–2017)
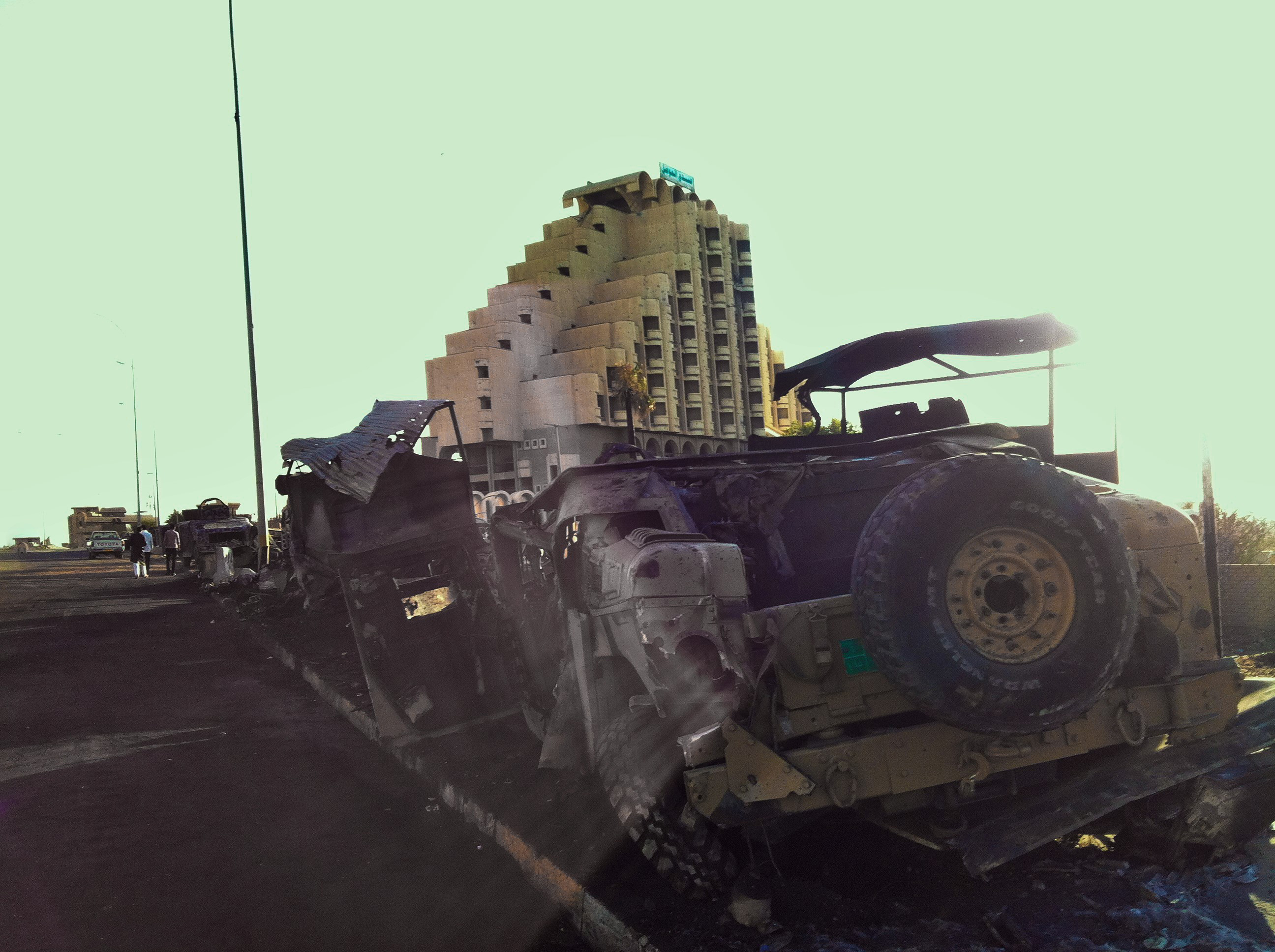
- A Humvee destroyed after an ISIL attack in Mosul on 14 June 2014
Date	4–10 June 2014 (6 days)
Location	Mosul, Iraq
Result	ISIL victory: Continuing ISIL offensive on multiple targets in Iraq
Territorial changes	ISIL captures all of Mosul on June 10.; Iraqi Army and Police completely abandon Mosul.; ISIL captures the Government Municipality Headquarters, Mosul International Airport, Army bases, Police station, Mosul Prison, and the banks.

Belligerents
Iraq	Islamic State of Iraq and the Levant Naqshbandi Army; GMCIR

Commanders and leaders
(Iraq) Mahdi al-Gharrawi	(Islamic State) Muhammad Sa'id Abdal-Rahman al-Mawla (Islamic State) Abu Abdulrahman al-Bilawi † Izzat Ibrahim al-Douri (JRTN)

Units involved
2nd Division (Iraq); 3rd Division (Iraq); PMC; Awakening Councils; Private militias	Military of ISIL

Strength
60,000: 30,000 soldiers (Two divisions, with Police forces outnumbering fighters by more than 15-to-1); 30,000 federal police; minus unknown number of no-show ghost soldiers, possibly reducing man-power to 20% of its official count.	1,500–5,500+ fighters/militants or 1,000

Casualties and losses
2,500+ killed 4,000 prisoners executed Thousands deserted	At least 105 killed
- 6,605+ killed overall Around 500,000 civilians displaced from Mosul

The fall of Mosul occurred between 4 and 10 June 2014, when Islamic State of Iraq and the Levant (ISIL) and allied insurgents captured the city of Mosul from the Iraqi Army. The ISIL forces were initially led by Abu Abdulrahman al-Bilawi, while the Iraqi army's forces were led by Lieutenant General Mahdi al-Gharrawi.

On 4 June, the insurgents began their efforts to capture Mosul. The Iraqi army officially had 30,000 soldiers and another 30,000 federal police stationed in the city, facing a 3,000-member attacking force. The Iraqi forces' actual numbers were much lower due to ghost soldiers, severely reducing combat ability. After six days of combat and massive desertions, Iraqi soldiers received orders to retreat. The city of Mosul, including Mosul International Airport and the helicopters located there, all fell under ISIL's control. An estimated 500,000 civilians fled from the city.

A former commander of the Iraqi ground forces, Ali Ghaidan, accused former Prime Minister Nouri al-Maliki of being the one who issued the order to withdraw from the city of Mosul. Mosul would remain under ISIL control for several years. Iraqi forces initiated an offensive to retake the city in 2016; the Battle of Mosul ended in its liberation in July the following year.

== Background ==
Beginning in December 2013, ongoing clashes occurred between tribal militias, Iraqi security forces, and the Islamic State in Iraq and the Levant (ISIL) throughout western Iraq. In early January 2014, ISIL militants successfully captured the cities of Fallujah and Hīt, bringing much of Al Anbar Governorate under their control. The Iraqi Army then began conducting an offensive into Anbar in an attempt to retake the region. Iraqi forces recaptured Samarra on 5 June 2014, and also heavily shelled Fallujah to weaken the ISIL forces there. However, ISIL had made territorial advances in neighboring Syria, giving them access to more weapons and substantially strengthening their position.

In early June, following the Iraqi Army's campaign in the Anbar region, insurgents began advancing into the central and northern parts of Iraq. During the advancement, Iraqi security forces killed ISIL military chief Abu Abdulrahman al-Bilawi on 4 June near Mosul. ISIL named the military operation that resulted in their seizure of Mosul "Bilawi Vengeance", a reference to their late commander's alias. Just before the operation began, insurgents still controlled most of Fallujah and Garmah, as well as parts of Haditha, Jurf Al Sakhar, Anah, Qa'im, Abu Ghraib, and several smaller settlements in the Anbar Province.

== Fall of Mosul ==
On 4 June, Iraqi police, under the command of Lieutenant General Mahdi al-Gharrawi, cornered ISIL military leader Abu Abdulrahman al-Bilawi near Mosul, in Iraq. Al-Bilawi blew himself up, and Gharawi hoped it would prevent an attack.

At 2:30 in morning, ISIL convoys of pickup trucks, each truck carrying four fighters, entered Mosul by shooting at the city's checkpoints. Though Mosul's first line of defense was thought to contain 2,500 soldiers, Gharawi says that "reality was closer to 500". He noted that since all of the city's tanks were being used by Iraqi forces in Al Anbar Governorate, the city was left with little to combat the ISIL fighters. The insurgents hanged, burned, and crucified some Iraqi soldiers during their attack.

On 5 June, a curfew was imposed in the city. The government used helicopters to bomb the militants. In the southern part of the city, five suicide bombers blasted an arsenal.

On 6 June ISIL began their attack on the northwestern part of the city. The ISIL forces in the city totaled 1,500 militants, outnumbered by Iraqi forces by more than 15 to 1. Two suicide bomber cars exploded, in Muwaffakiya, a village near Mosul, killing six Shabak soldiers. After the attacks, most of the fighters either retreated into the desert or camouflaged among the local population.

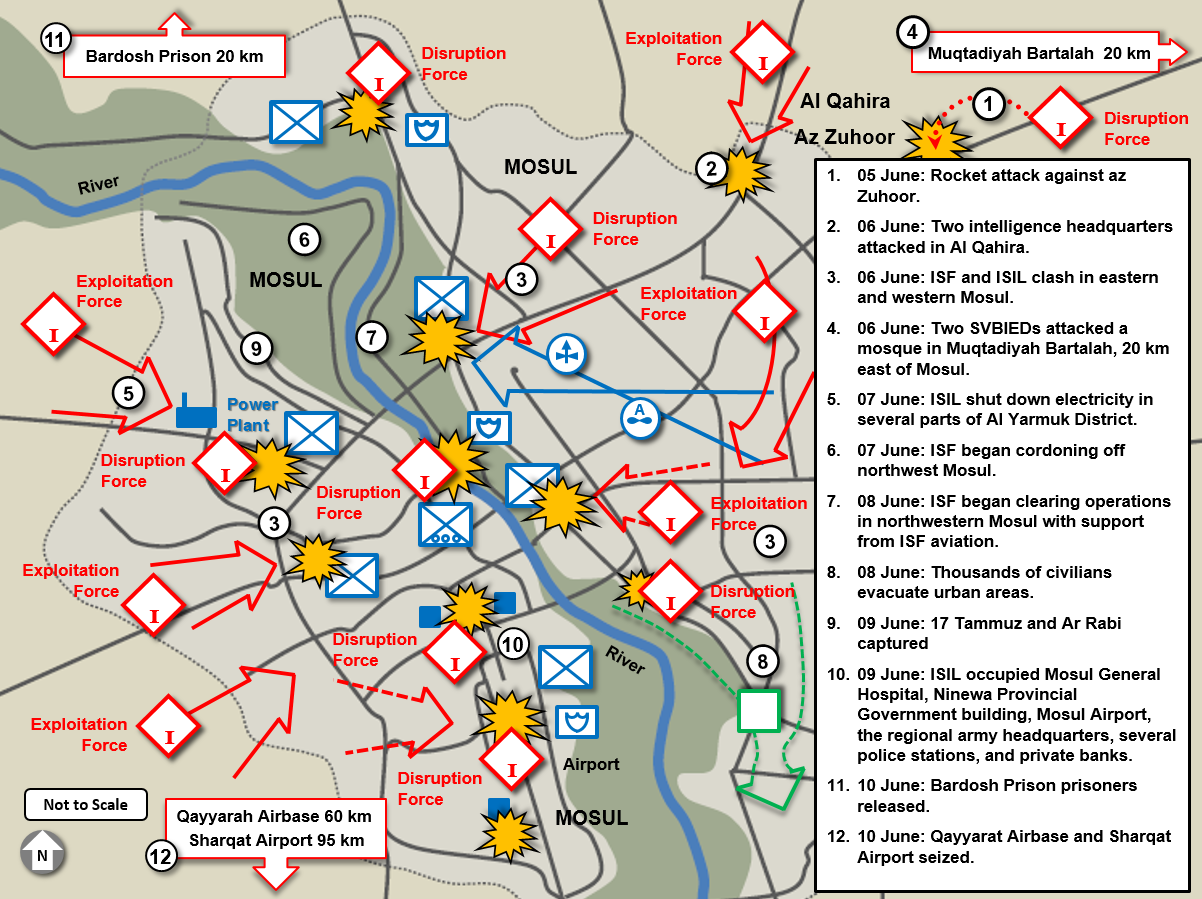
U.S. Army diagram of the fall of Mosul

On 8 June, the group launched a double bomb attack against a Patriotic Union of Kurdistan party office in Jalawla, in which eighteen people died. That day, about a hundred vehicles entered Mosul, carrying at least four hundred men. Sleeper cells hidden within the city were then activated and according to police, "neighbourhoods rallied to them". Assassinations carried out by the sleeper cells left Mosul leaderless. The group also bombed a police station in the neighborhood of al-Uraybi, and encircled an abandoned building on the west of Tigris River being used as a headquarters for a group of thirty police officers.

On 9 June, ISIL executed fifteen Iraqi security force members who were captured in Tikrit. According to CBS News, ISIL fighters armed with machine guns and rocket-propelled grenades stormed the Nineveh provincial headquarters that same day. By that time, the Fourth Battalion were among the last local police fighting the attackers, the rest of the defense forces having run away or joined the opposition. Lacking plans and ammunition, Gharawi ordered the Iraqi military to retreat on the advice of retired general Khaled al-Obeidi. On that same night, ISIL and Sunni militants attacked Mosul, causing heavy fighting overnight. Iraqi Army soldiers fled the city while it was under attack, allowing the militants to control much of Mosul by midday on 10 June. The militants seized numerous facilities, including Mosul International Airport, which had served as a hub for the U.S. military in the region. Militants captured the helicopters present at the airport, in addition to "several villages" and a military airbase in south Saladin Governorate. The Iraqi army "crumbled in the face of the militant assault", which is evidenced by the fact that soldiers abandoned their weapons and dressed as civilians to blend in with the noncombatants.

The city fell to the IS on 10 June 2014 after four days of clashes between the insurgents and the Iraqi military. There were reports that the group was advancing from Mosul to Kirkuk at the time. While capturing the city, the group freed nearly 1,000 prisoners, some of whom were greeted by the fighters. Black flags were also flown over government buildings.

== Aftermath ==
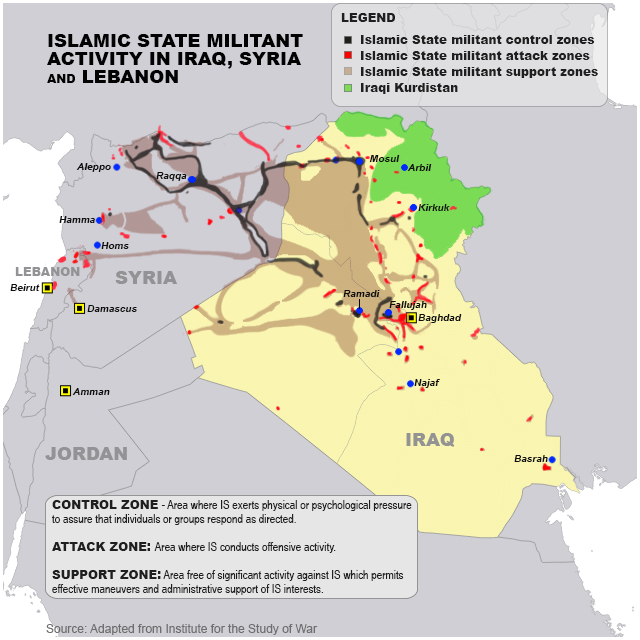
Areas of IS control and activity in Syria and Iraq by May 2015

On 11 June, ISIL insurgents entered the oil refinery town of Baiji, seizing and setting its main courthouse and police station on fire. The militants, who were travelling in a group of around 60 vehicles, also took control of the Baiji prison and freed all the inmates within. Local residents told members of the media that ISIL sent a group of local tribal chiefs ahead of them, trying to convince the 250 guards at the oil plant to withdraw. Soldiers and police were also warned to leave the area. Al Jazeera claimed that later that day, militants retreated from Baiji after reinforcements from the Iraqi Army's Fourth Armored Division arrived in the city.

That day, ISIL members also seized the Turkish consulate in Mosul, kidnapping 49 Turkish employees, including the Consul General, three children, and several members of the Turkish Special Forces. Reports suggested that the abducted were taken to a nearby militant base and were unharmed. An unnamed Turkish official confirmed that the government was in contact with ISIL. Prime Minister Recep Tayyip Erdoğan held an emergency meeting with members of the National Intelligence Agency (MIT) and Deputy Prime Minister Beşir Atalay to discuss the situation. The attack came a day after 28 Turkish truck drivers were abducted by militants while delivering fuel to a power plant in Mosul.

After seizing control of Mosul, ISIL forces executed an estimated 4,000 Iraqi Security Force prisoners, and dumped their bodies in the single largest known mass grave in Iraq, at the Khafsa Sinkhole. This mass grave was later uncovered during the Battle of Mosul (2016–2017).

Insurgents took full control of Tikrit on the evening of 11 June. Local officials reported that checkpoints had been set up around the city, and that at least 300 inmates had been freed from the city's prisons, many of them serving sentences under terrorism charges.

In response to the fall of Mosul and its aftermath, the Iraqi government said that it would arm its civilians and its parliament would declare a state of emergency. The government also spoke of a plan to reorganize its military, involving a collaboration between tribal people and the U.S. military.

== Response ==
The U.S. State Department said that it was "deeply concerned" and that it felt that the situation was "extremely serious". The State Department spokeswoman Jen Psaki said, "This growing threat exemplifies the need for Iraqis from all communities to work together to confront this common enemy and isolate these militant groups from the broader population".

Osama al-Nujaifi, a speaker of the Iraqi Parliament, who hailed from Mosul said that "what happened is a disaster by any standard". He also criticized the "negligence" of the army as they withdrew from the city. Prime Minister Nouri al-Maliki, also asked for "help" from "friendly governments".

A Mosul-based businessman commented that the "city fell like a plane without an engine" as "they were firing their weapons into the air, but no one was shooting at them". One officer told Reuters that "they [ISIL militants] appear, strike and disappear in seconds."

== Reconstruction campaign ==
UNESCO is leading an initiative called "revive the spirit of Mosul", with a budget of US$105.5 million to help rebuild the country. This project was financed by 15 UNESCO partners. The United Arab Emirates is supporting the rehabilitation of the Al Nouri Mosque and the Al-Hadba minaret, Al Saa'a Church and Al Tahera Church (US$38.5 million) and the European Union is supporting the reconstruction of houses and schools in the Old City of Mosul and Basra (US$38.5 million).

According to Audrey Azoulay, Director-General of UNESCO, "Reconstruction will succeed and Iraq will regain its influence only if the human dimension is given priority; education and culture are the key elements. They are forces of unity and reconciliation."

The initiative not only involves rebuilding infrastructure, but also aims to revive disappearing traditional arts and crafts.

== See also ==
- Syrian civil war
- Fall of Aleppo (2024)
- Fall of Kabul (2021)
- Fall of Phnom Penh
- Fall of Saigon
- Libyan civil war (2014–2020)
- Derna campaign (2014–2016)
- Fall of Fallujah
- First Battle of Tikrit
- Siege of Kobanî
- Sinjar massacre
- Northern Iraq offensive (August 2014)
- December 2014 Sinjar offensive
- November 2015 Sinjar offensive
- Fall of Hīt (2014)
- Battle of Baiji (2014–2015)
- Battle of Ramadi (2014–2015)
- Mosul offensive (2015)
- Second Battle of Tikrit
- Fall of Nofaliya (2015)
- List of wars and battles involving the Islamic State
