= Tanks of Iraq =

Tanks have been utilized in Iraq both within the military and within several conflicts with their usage and origin after World War II; the Cold War; and the modern era. This includes imported Soviet tanks as well as British designs imported after World War II, and current American ones.

== Overview ==
Iraq originally had tanks from Italy which were involved in the Anglo-Iraqi War when two mechanised battalions, with a number of L3/35 light tanks surrounded the British at RAF Habbaniya. Later Iraq got tanks from Great Britain it received after its independence in 1947. From these beginnings the modern Iraqi Armoured forces grew and procured modern armoured fighting vehicles from Russia and Soviet Bloc that served during the Cold War, and various operations. One of the main Iraqi operations using armor was during the Iraq-Iran war, and the Gulf War.

== History ==
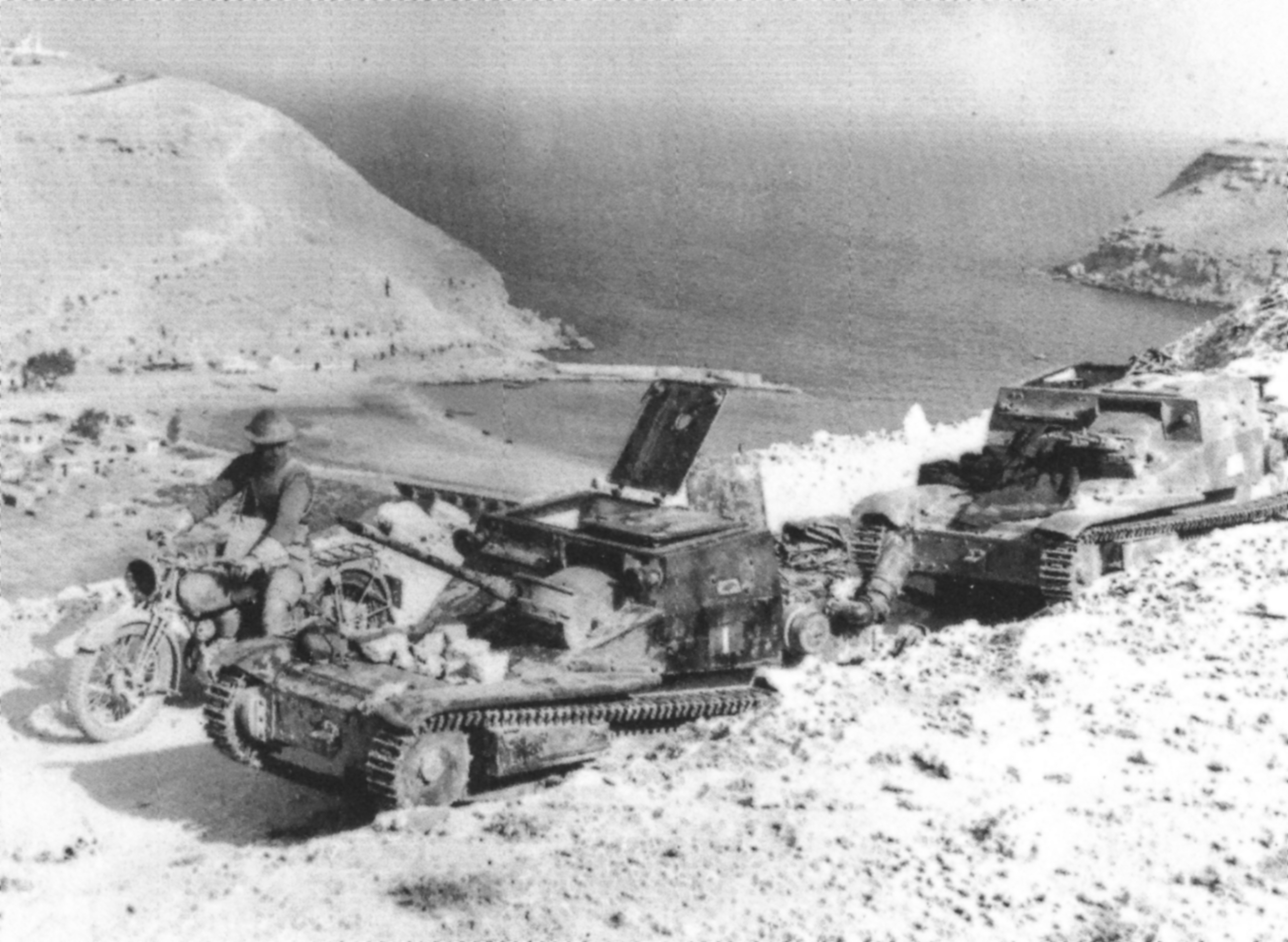
A L3 cc (left) and an L3/35 (right) in 1941.

It is estimated that 16 L3s were purchased by Iraq from Italy before World War II. On 22 March 1941, two of these Iraqi L3s were reported to have been put out of action near Fallujah during the Anglo-Iraqi War. Later, Iraq received WWII tanks from the British after they left, and then turned to the Soviet Bloc for more modern designs of the time such as the T-55, T62, T69, T72.

Iraqi Centurion Mk.5 tanks at Al Rashid, south of Baghdad, during a ceremony in 1956.

Iraq began the Iran–Iraq War confident their new tanks from the Soviet Bloc would allow them victory. The Iraqis could mobilize up to 12 mechanised divisions, and morale was running high. The war however, led to eight years of back and forth battles, with heavy losses on both sides. The need for replacement of its tanks forces led Iraq to invade Kuwait which led to the start of the Persian Gulf War.

Iraqi-operated many T-62s but it lacked high powered optics, thermal sights and ballistic computers compared to their adversaries in the Gulf War. The Iraqi 3rd Armoured Division alone lost about a hundred T-62 tanks, while no Abrams or Challengers were lost to enemy fire.

The Lion of Babylon (or Asad Babil) was a name given to what was a locally produced variant of the Soviet T-72 tank during the late-1980s. The name is sometimes incorrectly used to refer to standard T-72s in Iraqi service, which were imported from the Soviet Union and Poland. In 1986 a West German company built a factory in Taji to manufacture steel for several military uses. It was enlisted to retrofit and rebuild tanks already on duty in the Iraqi Army, such as T-54/55s, T-62s, and several hundred of Soviet and Polish T-72s, imported during early stages of the war with Iran.

In the late-1980s plans were made to produce new T-72M1 tanks in Taji. These tanks were to be assembled from knockdown kits delivered by the Polish state-owned company Bumar-Łabędy. The assembly was to start in 1989 and the tanks would receive the name Asad Babil (Lion of Babylon). According to Polish officials not a single T-72M1 was finished, even though in 1988 a T-72M was displayed on an Iraqi arms show, which was claimed to be locally produced. The local assembly of the T-72 started in Taji in early 1989 as suggested by Iraqi officials. A number of Iraqi officials such as Lt. General Amer Rashid however did not like the idea of being dependent on knockdown kits supplied by another country and pushed for the complete production of the T-72M1 tank instead. In 1991 the Taji plant was destroyed by an airstrike while being upgraded by Bumar-Łabędy.

During the 1980s, China sold hundreds of Type 59 and Type 69 MBTs to Iraq. By the Persian Gulf War of 1990 and 1991, western analysts claim that Iraq had upgraded some Type 69s with a 105 mm gun, a 60 mm mortar, and a 125 mm gun with an auto-loader. All of them were reinforced with frontal layer armor welded on the glacis plate. All these versions were known as Type 69-QMs. It was reported during the 1991 Gulf War that the Iraqi Type 69 units fought harder than the elite Republican Guard units, equipped with T-72 MBTs. One possible explanation is that Saddam Hussein ordered his Republican Guard units to preserve their strength, while sending the rest of the army, equipped with inferior Type 69 tanks, to the frontline.

According to battle reports from the 2003 invasion of Iraq, Type 69-QMs were used by the Iraqi Army units defending Nasiriyah in March 2003, most of them being employed as artillery pillboxes. They played an important role in the ambushes mounted against the US Army 507th Maintenance Company and Charlie Company of the 1st Battalion, 2nd Marines, before AH-1 Cobra helicopters wiped out the Iraqi tanks. Two Type 69s destroyed at least four vehicles of the 507th, among them a heavy truck rammed by one of the tanks. There is also a first hand account of about four Type 69s hidden behind some buildings, pounding the Marines' Charlie Company with indirect fire and likely disabling several AAVs. Some combat useless Type 59/69s were emplaced as decoys or mere obstacles.

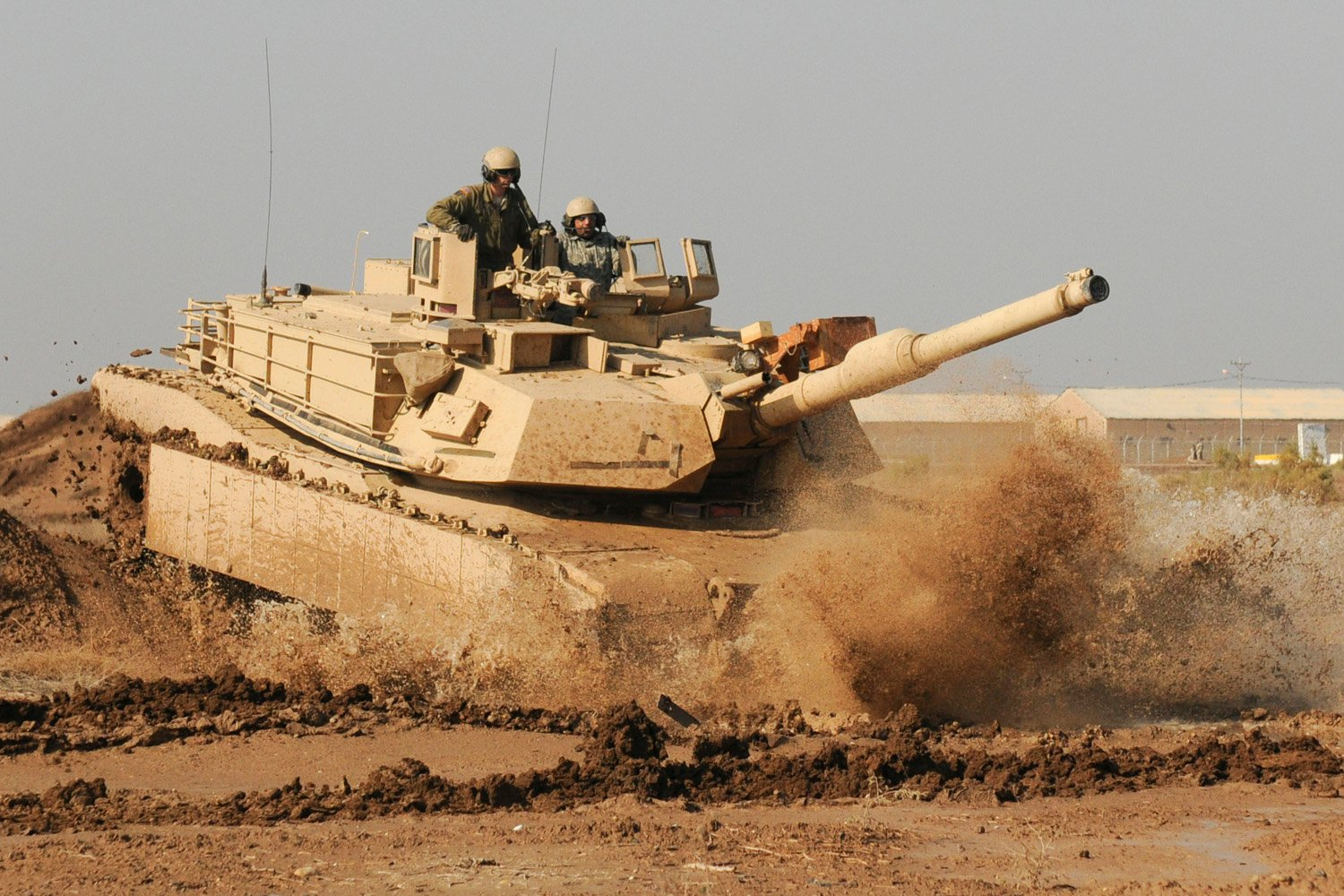
9th Division M1 Abrams in Camp Taji, Iraq.

After the war, the Iraqis received American tanks such as the M1 Abrams which were used in the fight against ISIS. The 9th Armoured Division of the Iraqi Army, was reformed after the recreation of the Iraqi Army began after 2003. A 2006 article in ARMY Magazine described how the division was being built from the 'wreckage of the old Republican Guard. ..[i]ts facilities occupy the greater portion of Camp Taji, Iraq, in scores of refurbished buildings that once belonged to the Republican Guard, and much of its equipment was salvaged' from the old regime's junk. T-55 tanks and 'armoured personnel carriers for two of its three brigades were cobbled together from battle-damaged vehicles..' at Camp Taji. Contractors rebuilt functioning equipment from the scrap. Used T-72 tanks for the division's third brigade were to be purchased from a former Soviet Bloc country.

It was certified and assumed responsibility of the battle space of north Baghdad Governorate on June 26, 2006. In September 2006, ARMY Magazine said that two of the division's brigades had already been fielded and were operationally partnered with U.S. Army units. The division had carried out its first command post exercise in the northern summer of 2006.

One of the division's commanders has been General Riyadh Jalal Tawfiq, who was eventually promoted to Lieutenant General and took over the Ninevah Operational Command. Other divisional commander have included Major General Bashar Mahmood Ayob (2006) and, as of April 2009, Major General Qassim Jassem Nazal.

The 3rd Armoured Division was the elite unit of the army, and had fought Persian Gulf War, operations in the 1990s, and the 2003 invasion of Iraq. It was disbanded when the Iraqi Armed Forces were formally dissolved by Coalition Provisional Authority Order Number 2, and reformed after 2003. Its units were part of the original three division New Iraqi Army. The 3rd Division was transferred from coalition control to the Iraqi Ground Forces Command on 1 December 2006.

In 2014, the 6th Brigade of the 3rd Division was described as 'the first line of Mosul's defence' against ISIS. Infantry, armour and tanks had been shifted to Anbar in the fight there with ISIS, and had left Mosul with virtually no tanks and a shortage of artillery,' according to Lieutenant General Mahdi Gharawi, commander of the Ninevah operational command. During the fight in Mosul, the offensive in Northern Iraq during June 2014, the division, was almost totally destroyed in fighting with ISIS. The exception appeared to be the 4th Battalion of the 10th Brigade, which had been defending a position outside Tall Afar in early July 2014.

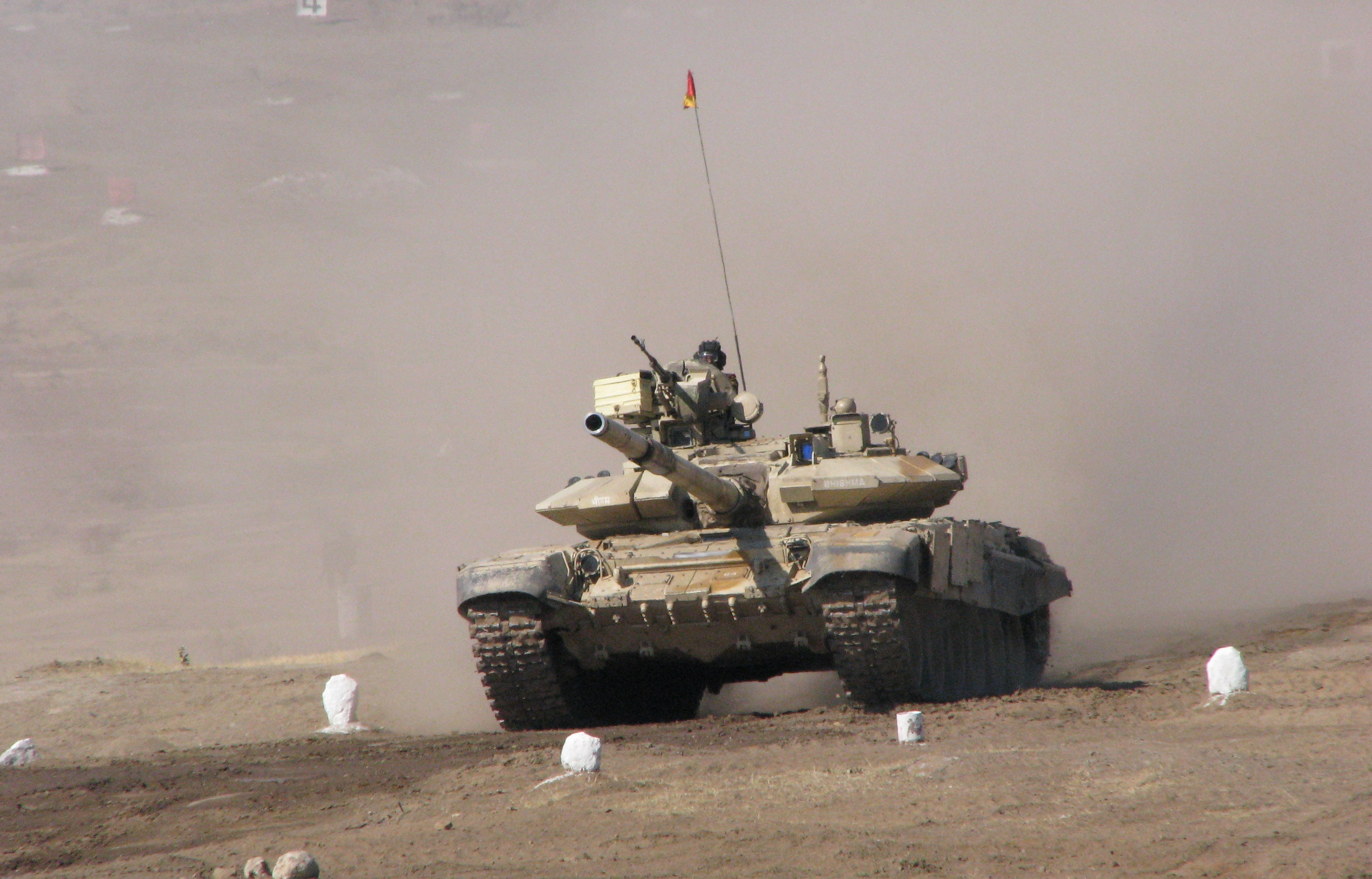
A T-90S Main Battle Tank.

Iraq became to look for adding more tanks for its army during its fight with ISIS, and had 73 T-90S/SK tanks ordered in 2016, reportedly followed by another in 2017. The total sum of the contract for the tanks may exceed one billion U.S. dollars confirmed by Russian presidential aide Vladimir Kozhin. Deliveries reportedly began in November 2017. The first deliveries were confirmed in February 2018. 75 tanks delivered as of June 2018. Two more parties were delivered as of April 2019.

Iraq also used tanks captured in various conflict such as M4 and M4/105 Shermans, M51 Shermans, M36 tanks destroyers, and some captured ex-Iranian Chieftains, M47, M48, and M60 Pattons.

== Iraq organization of armored forces ==
Saddam Hussein ousted Ahmed Hassan al-Bakr, and began a build up of Soviet-built armored vehicles, MBTs, APCs, IFVs and the army was trained by foreign (Soviet) instructors.

As he consolidated his government, Saddam built up the number of tanks for the army. Iraqi armored forces were organized at first to defend the revolutionary Iraqi state, and later enable intervention in foreign military conflicts. The regular army with its armored forces was built up with considerable Soviet military assistance and reached its peak in 1980, when it began a war with Iran. In offensive action in the conflict, tanks, reconnaissance armored vehicles, armored personnel carriers and artillery pieces of the first echelon unit normally attack using Soviet military doctrine, which if defending the tanks are dug in with the armored units and soldiers, while the heavy artillery forms up behind to support them.

== Overview of Tanks ==
=== Light and medium tanks ===
Name	Country of origin	Quantity	Notes
L3/35	Kingdom of Italy	16	Iraq had 16 Italian L3 tankettes (Carro Veloce CV-35), purchased before WWII and used briefly in the 1941 Anglo-Iraqi War, particularly around Fallujah, before being replaced by more modern tanks from the British and Soviet blocs later.
M.13/40	Kingdom of Italy		
Cruiser A15 Crusader Mk I	United Kingdom		
Light Tank Mk VI	United Kingdom		
M24 Chaffee	United States		
Churchill Mk VII	United Kingdom		
Centurion Mk 5/1	United Kingdom		
M4A2 Sherman	United States		
M4A3 Sherman	United States		
M50 "Super Sherman"	Israel	1	
T-34-85	Soviet Union	175	

=== Heavy tanks ===
Name	Country of origin	Quantity	Notes
IS-2Ms	Soviet Union	41	

=== Main battle tanks ===
Name	Country of origin	Quantity	Notes
T-54/55	Soviet Union	72	1850 tanks delivered from soviet Union and other countries between 1958-1985 T-55Ms active
T-62	Soviet Union	100	2850 tanks delivered from soviet union between 1973-1989
WZ-121/Type 69	China	100	Around 1500 delivered from china between 1983-1988
T-72	Soviet Union	100	A total of 1038 received before gulf war, many destroyed in the war, around 776 tanks were in service in 1996 until 2003. Iraqi government in 2009 was reported to buy 2000 more T72 tanks from Russia
Lion of Babylon (tank)	Iraq	100	
M-84/M-84A	Yugoslavia	9	
Chieftain Mk-5P	United Kingdom	75	
Vickers MBT Mk1	United Kingdom	75	
M47M Patton	United States	30	
M48A5 Patton	United States	20	
PT-76	Soviet Union	245	
T-90S	Russia	210	According to the SIPRI, Russia has delivered 73 T-90S/SK MBTs in 2018-2019.
M1 Abrams	United States	487	

== See also ==
- History of the tank
- Tanks in World War II
- Tank classification
- List of military vehicles
