= Ghost soldiers =

Scheme involving soldiers who are not in service

Ghost soldiers or ghost battalions refers to absentee army troops whose names appear on military rolls, but who are not actually in military service, generally in order to divert part of the soldiers' salaries to an influential local entity such as army officers or others. Soldiers may equally benefit from the corruption scheme by returning to their civilian occupations and routines while gaining marginal income. The practice, however, weakens the military and makes it susceptible to military offensives and major defeats since leaders ignore the true number of available troops at their disposal on various frontlines. Severe occurrences of ghost soldiers have been cited in Vietnam, Iraq, Afghanistan, Syria, Somalia, and other countries with dramatic military, humanitarian, and historic consequences.

== Transnational ==
In a 2008 transnational analysis, John Hudson and Philip Jones found a negative correlation between a country's level of corruption and the cost per soldier. Indeed, a higher corruption and rate of ghost soldiers results in lower reported maintenance costs.

== Historic cases ==
=== South Vietnam ===
Some officers in the Army of the Republic of Vietnam during the Vietnam War retained soldiers who had been killed or deserted for their role as "ghost soldiers". As units were allocated a set amount of rice for each soldier monthly, this allowed the officers to sell the excess rice for their own profit. ARVN officers also sometimes stole the pay allocated to these non-existent soldiers. This corruption was so widespread that it led to a significant over-estimation of the size of the army.

=== Russia ===
During the First and Second Chechen Wars in the Caucasus and the era in between them, there were reports of Russian soldiers being listed on the army's payroll, who either did not exist or had deserted while their commanding officers pocketed their pay. There were also reports of conscripts not being paid at all, being worked as slaves by their commanding officers while these same officers stole the soldiers' salaries.

During the Russo-Ukrainian War, rampant personnel and materiel shortages limited Russian martial projection and performances. While efforts were made after the dissolution of the Soviet Union to reform the Russian Armed Forces and upgrade it into a smaller, modern, reliable force, those efforts were unsuccessful and corruption remained rampant. Recruiters routinely inflated their numbers to pocket the difference. Russia's invasion of Ukraine plans and confidence stood upon false estimates, both in term of underestimating Ukraine's capabilities and overestimating Russia's human and material assets.

During the Northern Ukraine campaign, Russian armoured columns stopped only kilometres away from Kyiv, frozen by both the lack of infantry protecting their flanks from Ukrainian forces and from lack of fuel. Available fuel was likely in lower quantity than planned for. The operation's human and materiel shortages were both linked to corruption and earlier misleading upward reporting. The secrecy of the operation also likely prevented the opportunity for field commanders to report honest states of their troops.

=== Uganda ===
In a 2006 study of the Uganda People's Defence Force (UPDF), it was estimated that up to 30% of its force were ghost soldiers. Efforts to launch anti-corruption investigations by the Inspector General of Government on the UPDF have not been permitted "because sizable amounts obtained from corrupt military procurement and the phenomenon of 'ghost' soldiers were available for building political support for President Yoweri Museveni".

=== Iraq ===
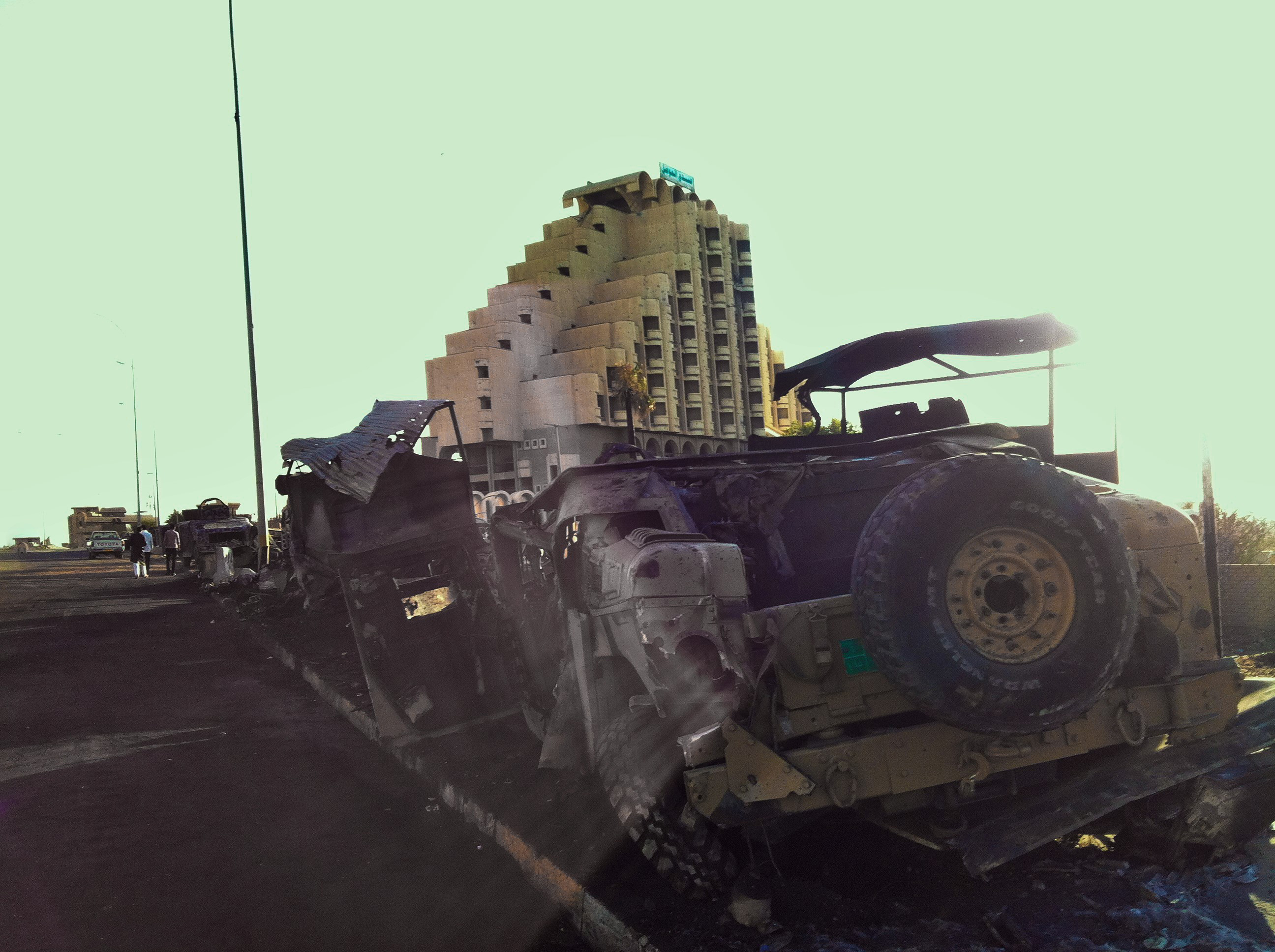
The rapid fall of Mosul, the 2nd largest Iraqi city to 800-1500 ISIL militants, is attributed in large part to the Iraqi military being far less manned than announced. The city would be largely destroyed and recaptured in the Battle of Mosul, where 10–20,000 soldiers and 10,000 civilians were killed.

The presence of ghost soldiers and battalions has been cited as a key reason for the chain of rapid and disastrous collapses and defeats of the Iraqi Army by ISIL in the early 2013-14 offensives. Cases of army officers and soldiers splitting the soldier's salary in exchange for not having to show up to the military barracks, work, and training are documented. The soldiers were then free to return to their civilian professions and routines, but have to return periodically to renew various certificates under the protection of his officer. The practice also provided Iraqi soldiers the possibility to retire after 10 years of such ghost service.

The military under Iraqi Prime Minister Nouri al-Maliki was known for its corruption. Maliki was also Minister of National Security Affairs and Minister of the Interior up to September 8, 2014. When ISIL increased its activity in the first part of the conflict, the Iraqi Army went through several spectacular debacles, including the June 2014 northern Iraq offensive which saw the catastrophic collapse of the army in that region and the fall of Mosul, where an army of 1,500 ISIL militants routed over 60,000 declared Iraqi soldiers. Local troops were more realistically in the range of 12,000, mostly inexperienced young recruits doing their compulsory service who disappeared as the battle started.

It bestowed his successor, Prime Minister Haidar al-Abadi, to fight this corruption. After investigation, Abadi publicly announced in November 2014 the discovery of 50,000 ghost soldiers, for an estimated annual loss of $360 million USD assuming an average monthly salary of $600. Some have suggested the loss could be 3 times larger. Abadi dismissed dozens of officers accused of corruption and of promoting their sub-officers based on loyalty rather than merit.

=== USA ===
Following 2001 September 11th attacks and US war on terror, US Defense Secretary Donald Rumsfeld argued the wars would make allies of occupied countries, via reconstruction efforts. The Civil Affairs and Psychological Operations Command was supposed to lead such efforts in Iraq and Afghanistan by restoring infrastructure such as electricity and water systems, but they were severely hampered by lack of staff. Internal Army memos show the operation lacked soldiers, training, military transportation, personal protections and equipment. These weaknesses were covered up by the usages of hundreds of ghost personnel. Those were reservists who actually couldn't deploy in occupied localities where infrastructural work was needed With such lack of protective resources or armored vehicles and missions in unsecured localities, the Civil Affairs soldiers made up easy targets. While they make up 5% of the reservists, they represented 23% of US losses. Such known and high attrition rate further depleted their human resources and ability to lead good will restoration of infrastructures. According to military personnel, the 2006 reorganisation backlashed. Only into Defense Secretary's Robert Gates (2006–2011) did the shortage eased. In later years, Rumsfeld's public memoir stated the lack of interest in rebuilding Afghanistan:

If some later contended that we never had a plan for full-fledged nation building or that we under-resourced such a plan, they were certainly correct. We did not go there to try to bring prosperity to every corner of Afghanistan.

— Donald Rumsfeld, Known and Unknown: A Memoir

=== Afghanistan ===
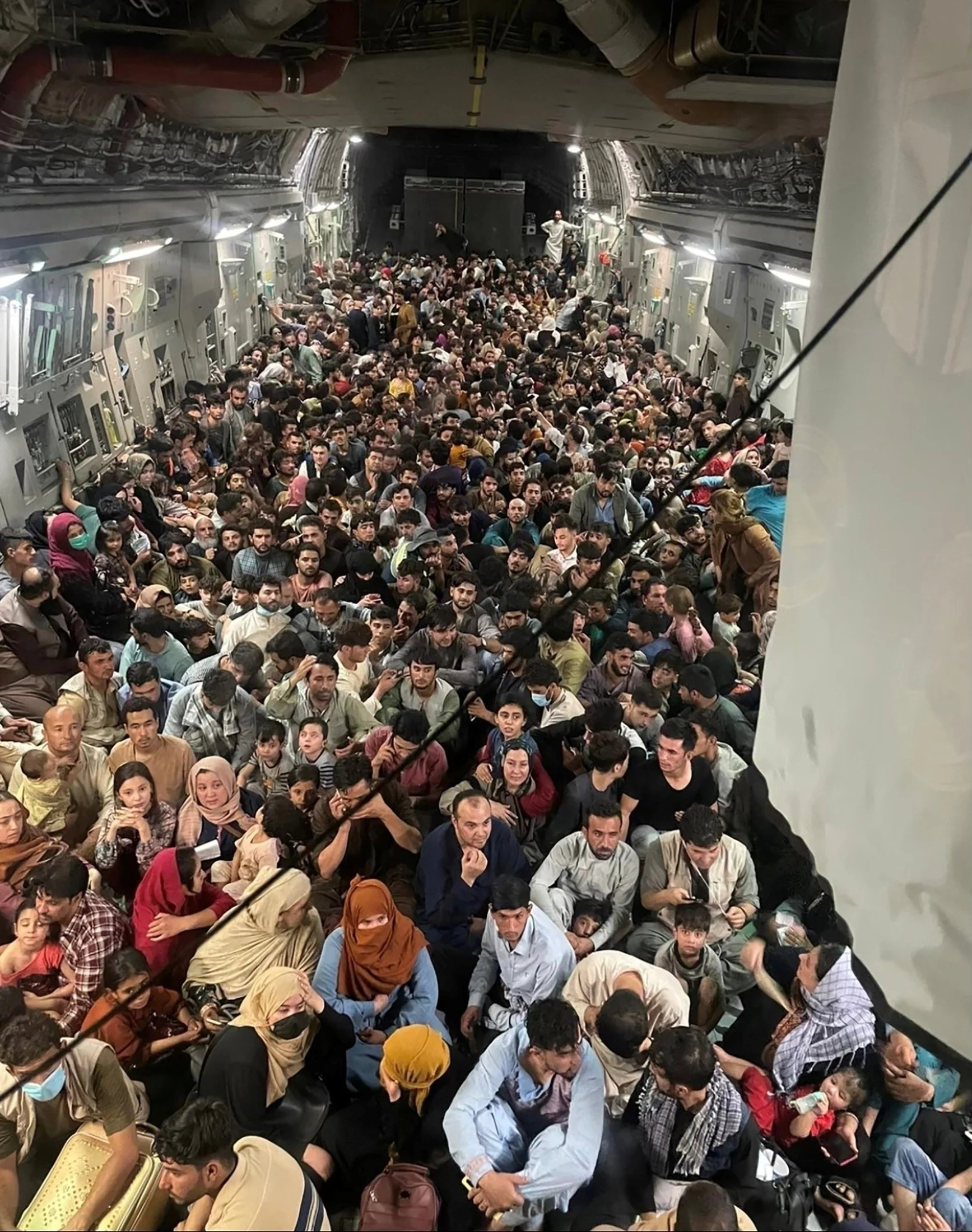
Afghans fleeing aboard a U.S. Boeing C-17 Globemaster III during the fall of Kabul, 15 August 2021. The rapid collapse of government forces in the face of the Taliban was partly attributed to rampant ghost soldiers, low military morale, and other corruption-related factors. The collapse resulted in a mass exodus of Afghans.

In 2016, at least 40% of names on the Afghan National Army roster in Helmand Province were nonexistent. A 2016 report by the Special Inspector General for Afghanistan Reconstruction (SIGAR) said, "neither the United States nor its Afghan allies know how many Afghan soldiers and police actually exist, how many are in fact available for duty, or, by extension, the true nature of their operational capabilities".

Officers siphoned off the salaries and rations for the ghost soldiers, which were one major phenomenon of the endemic corruption in Afghanistan. In Helmand, one base of 100 soldiers was left with only 50 soldiers; the other half were ordered to go back home while the commanding officer pocketed their salaries. When another base officially manned by 300 soldiers was attacked, only 15 soldiers were actually present. Officers failed to report up their troops' desertions, deaths, or departures, in order to hide failures and pocket the ghost soldiers' allowances.

Meanwhile, actual troops on isolated rural outposts and the frontlines faced low morale and harsh living conditions, with poor nutrition such as simple rice and tea. Troops engaged in smuggling drugs for additional income and using drugs, which could be reported to hostile forces and initiate an attack when soldiers were still under the influence of those drugs. Border patrol staff, which were not combat units, were forced to fill the gaps and defend positions when needed. While the U.S.-led coalition's military might and airpower provided decisive military advantages, long-term socio-economic solutions were needed to reinforce Afghan military forces.

In early 2019, at least 42,000 ghost soldiers were removed from the Afghan National Army's payroll.

Until shortly before the August 15, 2021 takeover by the Taliban, the Afghan Armed Forces were, on paper, 300,000 strong and built over the previous two decades by U.S. and NATO efforts. Over the course of just weeks, it was routed by a much smaller Taliban force, with most provincial capitals falling with little or no resistance. Khalid Payenda, the former Afghan finance minister, said in 2021, after the collapse of Afghan government, that most of the 300,000 soldiers and policemen on the government's roster did not exist, and the official count may have been six times larger than the actual count (suggested as 50,000 soldiers), or more than 80% of ghost soldiers. "Ghost soldiers" and widespread corruption in the military were a major cause of the government's rapid collapse after the U.S. withdrawal.

=== Syria ===
The 2024 fall of Bashar al-Assad in Syria, with minimal resistance and within under two weeks, was also suggested to be due to dramatically weaken brigades due to ghost soldiers, economic challenges affecting army salaries, and conjectural absence of its foreign protectors Russia, Iran, and Hezbollah.

== See also ==
- No-show job
