= Sabah Al-Fatlawi =

Iraqi military commander (died 2018)

Sabah al-Fatlawi
- صباح الفتلاوي
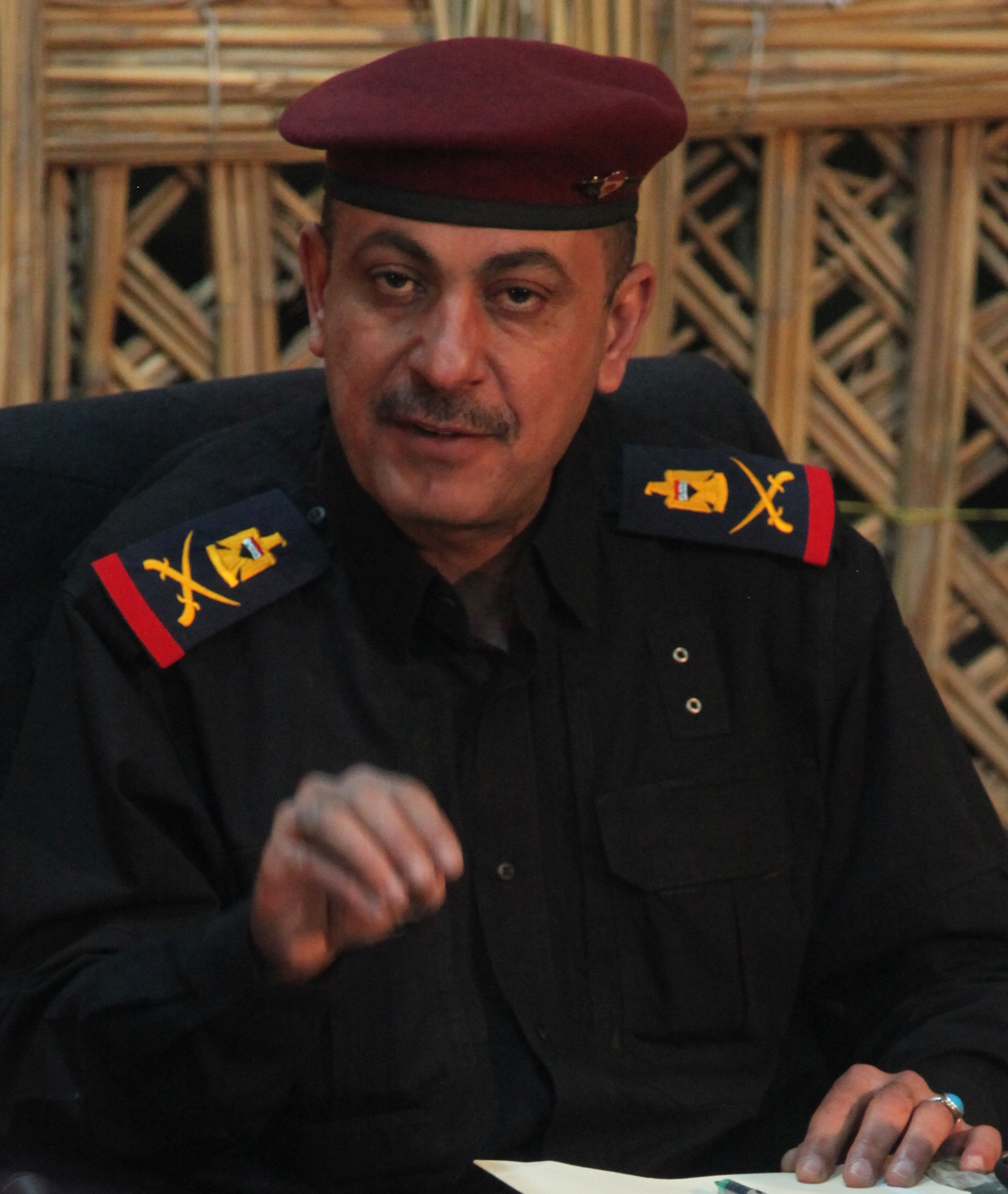
- Fatlawi in 2010.
- Died: 11 May 2018
- Military career
- Allegiance: Iraq
- Branch: Iraqi Special Operations Forces
- Rank: Major general
- Unit: Samarra Special Forces Regiment
- Commands: Samarra Special Forces Command
- Conflicts: 2014 Northern Iraq offensive

Sabah al-Fatlawi was an Iraqi major general who served as the chief commander of the Samarra Special Forces Command.

== Career ==
In 2010 Fatlawi, then a major general, was the chief of police for Dhi Qar province.

In October 2012 the interior ministry announced plans to transfer Fatlawi to the Samarra Special Forces command. On 26 November 2012, Fatlawi took over the leadership of the Samarra Special Forces Command from Gen. Rasheed Folayih, who was transferred to Baghdad.

=== 2014 Northern Iraq Offensive ===
As of June 2014 Fatlawi was still serving as the lead commander of Samarra Special Forces Command and was involved in directing Iraqi government forces during the 2014 Northern Iraq offensive. Under his command Iraqi special forces, backed by airstrikes, pushed back an ISIS attack on Samarra, leading ISIS forces to bypass the city on their press towards Baghdad.

== Personal life ==
On 7 April 2014 Fatlawi announced his intention to sue an MP from the Sadrist Ahrar Bloc for incitement and defamation. The MP had accused Fatlawi of being a Ba'athist.

Fatlawi is the brother of Hanan Saeed Mohsen al-Fatlawi; an MP and founder and leader of Eradaa Movement.

== See also ==
- Iraqi Security Forces
- Iraq War
- War on terrorism
