= Mosul International Airport =

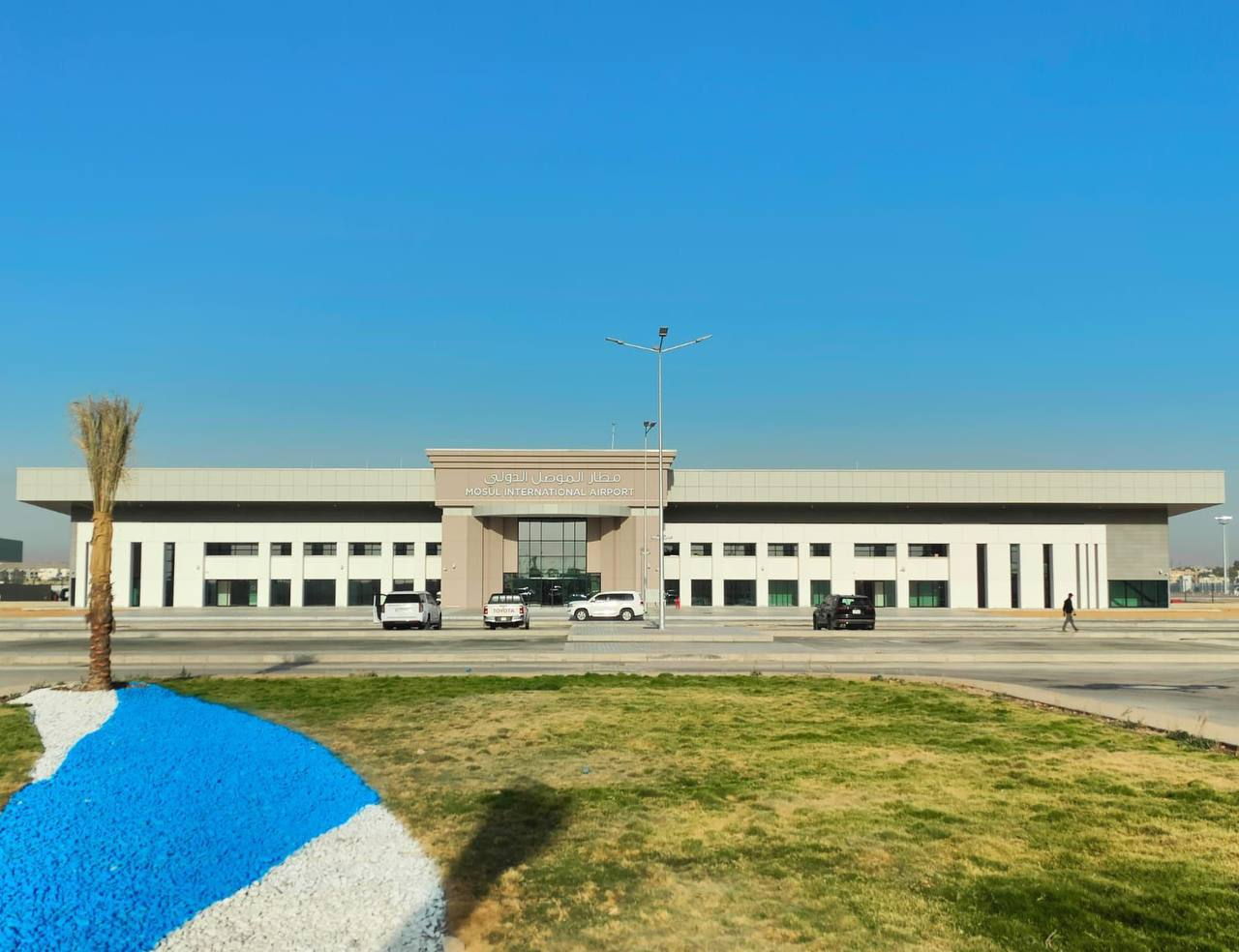
- IATA: OSM; ICAO: ORBM

Summary
- Airport type: Public / Military
- Owner: Government of Iraq
- Location: Mosul
- Elevation AMSL: 719 ft (219 m)
- Coordinates: 36°18′21″N 43°08′51″E

Map
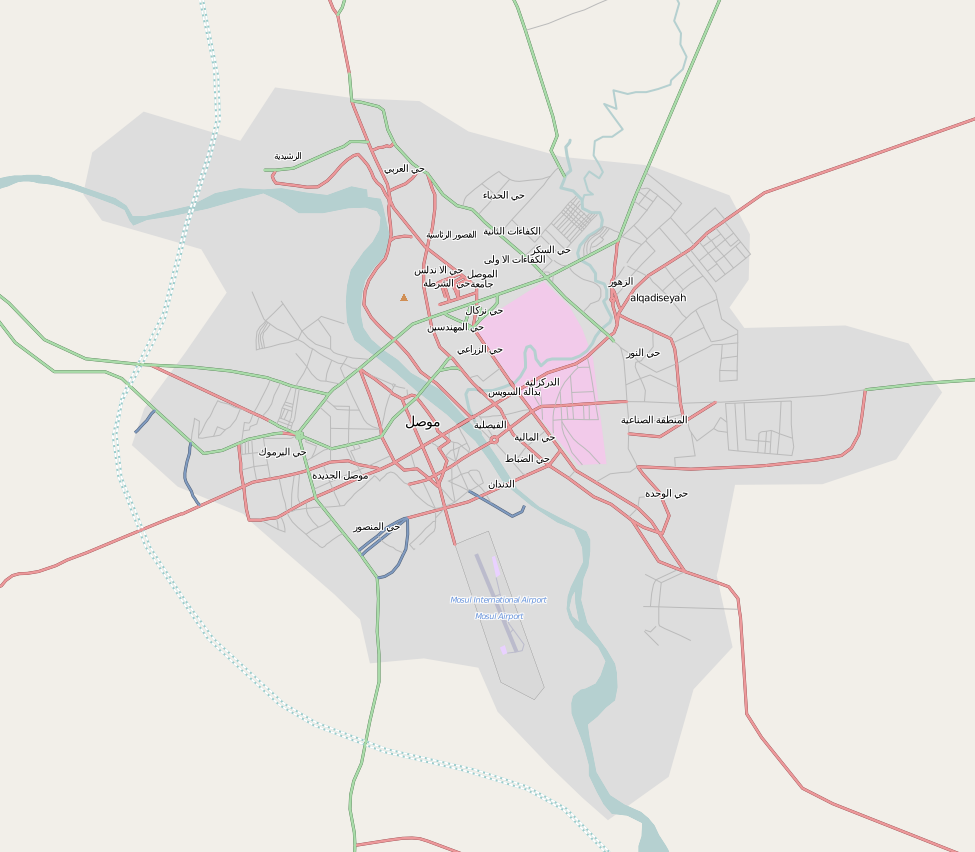
- Location of airport in Mosul

Runways
Direction	Length		Surface
Direction	ft	m	Surface
15/33	8,695	2,650	Concrete

Mosul International Airport (IATA: OSM, ICAO: ORBM) is an airport located at Mosul, capital of Nineveh Governorate, Iraq. It became a civil airport in 1990 with the rebuild of the runway (from asphalt to concrete) and construction of a new terminal. After undergoing major renovations to be able to reach international standards and category 1 status, it reopened as a civilian airport on 2 December 2007. On 9 June 2014, it was captured by militants from ISIL.

In February 2017, the Iraqi government recaptured the airport from the ISIL militants. It took Iraqi forces just 4 hours to battle the retreating ISIL opponent and clear them off the airport. The retaking of the airport was part of an offensive, that started on 19 February 2017 to retake Western Mosul from ISIL.

On December 27, 2020, the Iraqi Government allowed the Iraqi Civil Aviation Authority to negotiate and agree to a memorandum of understanding for the rehabilitation and reconstruction of the Mosul International Airport with Aeroports de Paris Ingenierie (ADPI) and SEA Milan Airports.

== History ==
The airfield was used by the British Royal Air Force (RAF) at the end of the Mesopotamian Campaign of World War I and from 1920 RAF aircraft squadrons (and from 1922 also Royal Air Force armoured car companies) were based there while Iraq was under the League of Nations British Mandate. RAF Mosul was handed over to the Royal Iraqi Air Force in 1936 under the terms of the 1931 Mandate but was used again by the RAF during World War II. It subsequently became a major Iraqi Air Force base, with at least a squadron of MiG-21s stationed there.

The military airfield was one of several Iraqi Air Force airfields in the mid-1970s which were rebuilt under project "Super-Base" in response to the experiences from Arab-Israeli wars in 1967 and 1973. In January 1991, it was reported to house operations involving MiG-23s loaded with underwing stores and Pilatus PC-7 trainers. It also housed aircraft seized during the August 1990 invasion of Kuwait, including an Airbus and Kuwait Airways Boeing 767, and also unidentified civilian aircraft including a Lockheed JetStar and Boeing 737. The airbase had a chemical weapons-associated storage bunker, and earth moving operations took place near a special storage bunker.

It was seized by Coalition forces in 2003 after the U.S.-led invasion. It became a United States Army facility that same year. The 101st Airborne Division was the first Army Unit to occupy the base in 2003. The Base was divided into two FOB's. FOB Marez to the West and FOB Diamondback to the East which incorporated the Airfield.

On 21 December 2004, fourteen US soldiers, four American employees of Halliburton, and four Iraqi soldiers were killed in a suicide attack on a dining hall at the Forward Operating Base (FOB) Marez, west of the main US military airfield at Mosul. The Pentagon reported that 72 other personnel were injured in the attack carried out by a suicide bomber wearing an explosive vest and the uniform of the Iraqi security services. The Islamic terrorist group Army of Ansar al-Sunna (partly evolved from Ansar al-Islam) declared responsibility for the attack in an Internet statement.

During 2006–2007, the U.S. government spent over 15 million US dollars restoring the airfield lighting, generators, and built a new air traffic control tower on the East side of the Field. At this time, the Airfield was under the control of the 82nd Airborne (1/17th CAV) which fell under the 25th Aviation Brigade which was based at Camp Speicher/COB-FOB Speicher (Al Sahra Airfield.) The FARP or refueling point was located at the Southeast end of the airfield.

During the 2007 Iraq surge, the base was downsized and consolidated into one FOB even though the footprint did not change. The name FOB Marez remained and the name of FOB Diamondback went away. Many of the extra CHU's and other types of portable structures were sent to Baghdad to accommodate the surge that was occurring in that area.

The former Iraqi Passenger Terminal was also restored and reopened for a flight in December 2007 for the Hajj. The Passenger Terminal was at the far Southwest corner of the airfield. Iraqi Airlines flew 152 passengers to Baghdad which was the first commercial flight since U.S. Forces declared the no fly zone in 1993.

In 2011, the airfield and the facility were turned over to the Iraqi Government.

On 9 June 2014, the airport was captured by militants from the Islamic State of Iraq and the Levant as part of the 2014 Northern Iraq offensive. Satellite images taken on 31 October 2016 shows that the airport runways have been damaged, with wide trenches carved into them and rubble placed along their lengths, according to Stratfor. Taxiways and aprons have also been sabotaged by ISIL militants. The airport was retaken by the Iraqi government in an effort spearheaded by the Federal Police on 23 February 2017.

In March 2018, de-mining operations started in the Mosul International Airport and were completed in November 2019.

In August 2020, the responsibility for the reconstruction of the Mosul International Airport was changed from the Nineveh Governorate to the Reconstruction Fund for Areas Affected by Terror Operations (REFAATO).

In December 2020, the Iraqi government came to a preliminary deal with SEA Milan Airports and Aeroports de Paris Ingenierie to reconstruct and renovate the Mosul International Airport. For the project SEA and Aeroports de Paris Ingenierie partnered with a local company and offered financing through a French government and Italian Government loan.

The airport was formally reinaugurated by Prime Minister Mohammed Shia al-Sudani on 16 July 2025, with resumption of regular flights scheduled in September.

On 6 November 2025, the first commercial flight of Iraqi Airways landed at Mosul International Airport from Baghdad after it resumed its operations.

== Airlines and destinations ==
The following airlines operate regular scheduled and charter flights to and from Mosul:

Airlines	Destinations
Iraqi Airways	Baghdad
