= Mahdi al-Gharrawi =

Iraqi general and police officer

Mahdi Al-Gharrawi
- مهدي صبيح آل الغراوي
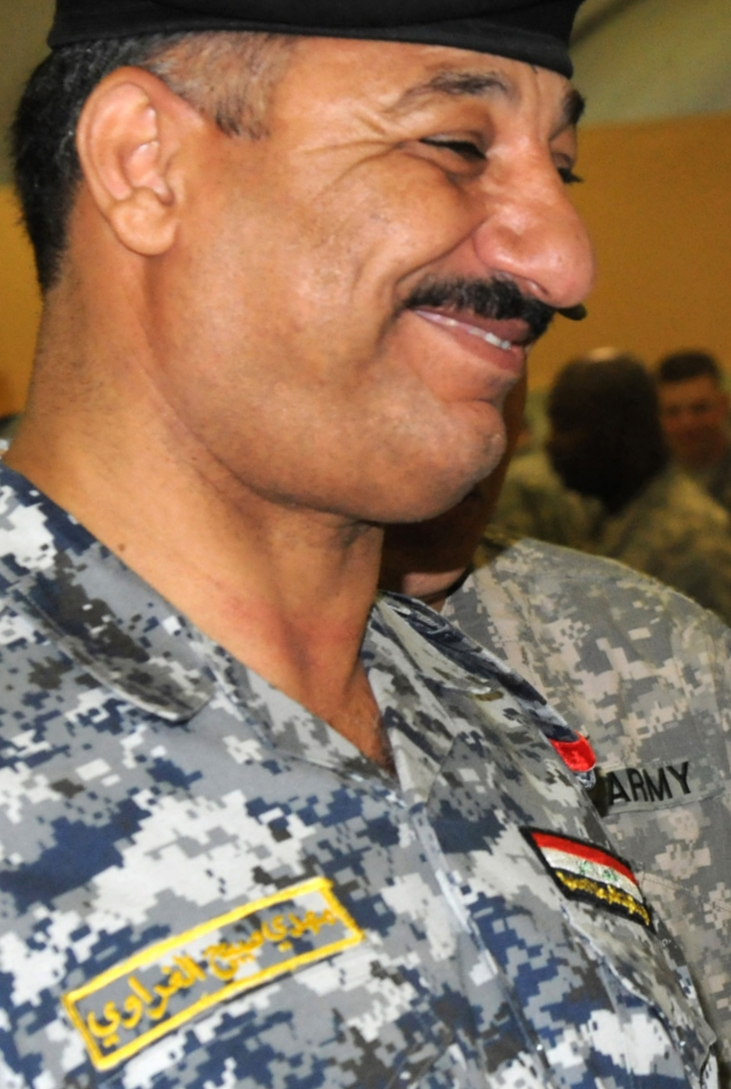
- Gharrawi in 2010
- Military career
- Allegiance: Iraq
- Branch: Iraqi Federal Police; Iraqi Ground Forces
- Rank: Lieutenant General
- Nickname: اسد الجزيره
- Commands: Ninewa Province Command; 3rd Division
- Conflicts: War in Iraq (2013-17); Northern Iraq offensive (June 2014)

Lt. General Mahdi Sabeh Al-Gharrawi is an Iraqi police officer, the former Commander of the Iraqi Federal Police in Nineveh Province, and lieutenant general of Iraqi Army.

Gharawi, along with several other military leaders, was dismissed from his position by Prime Minister Nouri al-Maliki on 17 June 2014 for failing in his "professional and military duty". His dismissal came a week after the fall of much of Northern Iraq to anti-government forces in the 2014 Northern Iraq offensive.

After serving two years in prison, Gharawi was released on 1 August 2020.

== See also ==
- Iraqi Security Forces
- Iraq War
- War on terrorism
