= 3rd Division (Iraq) =

- Active: c. 1930s–present
- Country: Iraq (2005–present)
- Branch: Iraqi Army
- Type: Motorised Infantry
- Size: Division
- Part of: Iraqi Ground Forces Command
- Garrison/HQ: Mosul
- Nickname: Salahuddin
- Engagements: Second World War; Mediterranean and Middle East theatre of World War II; Anglo-Iraqi War; Six-Day War; Yom Kippur War; Iran–Iraq War; First Battle of Khorramshahr; Operation Tariq al-Quds; Operation Jerusalem; Gulf War; Iraq War

Commanders
- Notable commanders: Juwad Shitnah; Mahdi Al-Gharrawi

The 3rd Division is a formation of the Iraqi Army. It has been active since 1941, however it disbanded along with the rest of the Iraqi Army in 2003, but was later reactivated by 2005.

== History ==
Before being disbanded in 2003, the previous 3rd Division had been one of the four original divisions of the Iraqi Army, being active in 1941 during the Anglo-Iraqi War. The division's most notable activity in the war came on 22 May when the division's 6th Infantry Brigade staged a counterattack against British forces in Fallujah which was repulsed.

In July 1958, elements of the division had overthrown the Iraqi government in the 1958 Iraqi coup d'état, with Abd al-Karim Qasim, commander of the 20th Infantry Brigade (or armoured brigade) stationed near Ba'quba, the originator of the coup. However, the actual overthrow was led by a battalion commander, Abdul Salam Arif, in the 19th Infantry Brigade.

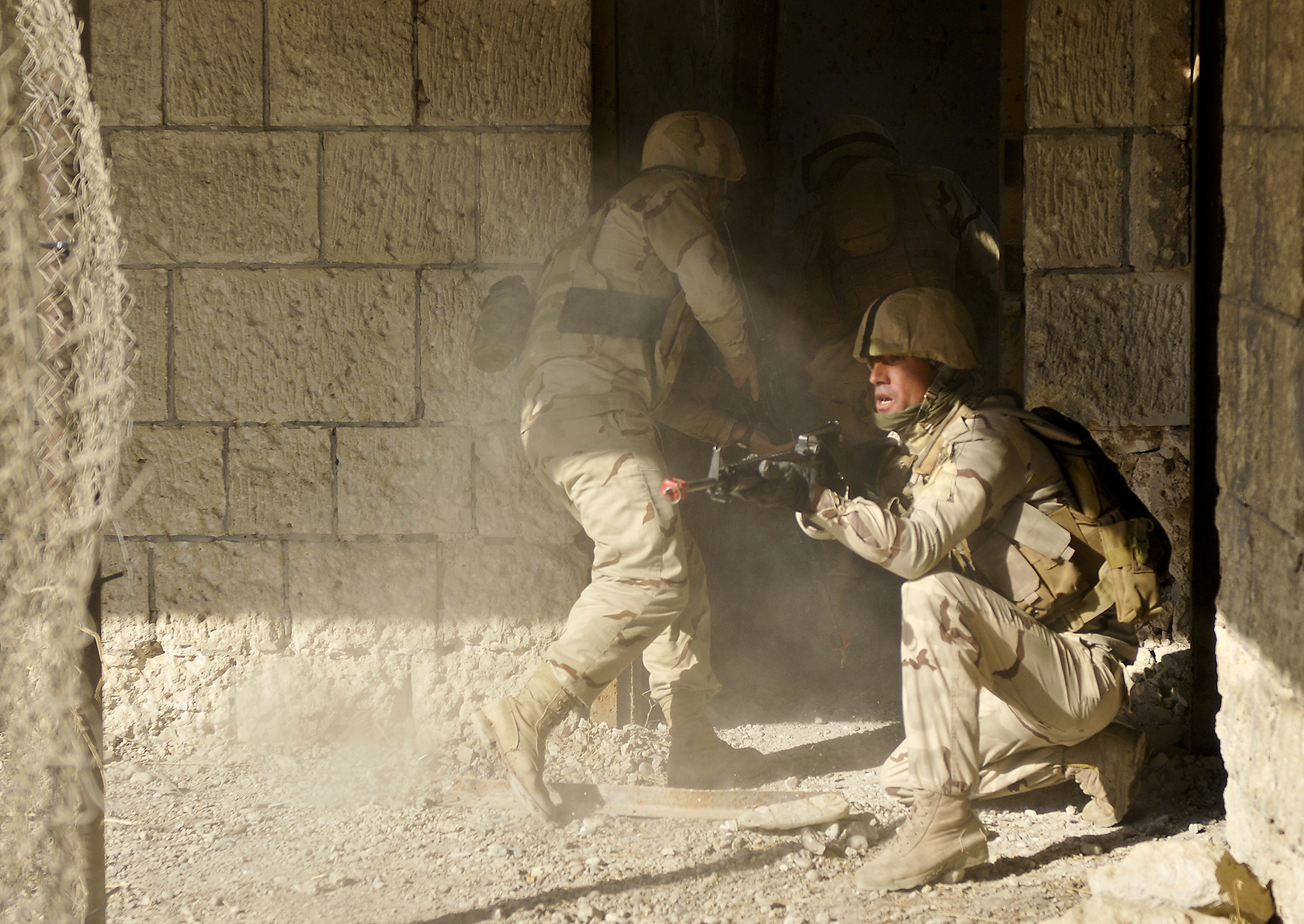
Soldiers of the 3rd Division during a training exercise in 2011

Sometime in the 1950s or 1960s, the division was converted into the 3rd Armoured Division, which was deployed to the 1967 Six-Day War. Iraqi participation in the Six-Day War was limited, principally owing to the slow reaction of the 3rd Armoured Division, which had been stationed in eastern Jordan. The 3rd Armoured Division did not organise itself and reach the front line before the Jordanians ceased operations. Later during the events of Black September in Jordan, 1970, the division was still stationed in northeast Jordan. Though the Jordanians needed forces to repel the Syrian invasion, they had to keep the 99th Brigade of their 3rd Armoured Division out of the conflict so that they could watch the Iraqi division.

The 3rd Armoured Division saw service later in the Yom Kippur War, under the command of Brigadier General Lafta and Abdul-Jawad Dhannoun, and was deployed alongside the Jordanian 40th Armoured Brigade. By that time, 'the division was the elite unit of the army, and Iraqi officers avidly competed to be assigned to it.' The Division suffered heavy casualties during the war, losing more than 157 tanks, 278 dead and 898 wounded. The 8th Mechanised Brigade was completely destroyed on 13 October in an ambush set by four Israeli armoured brigades at Tel Shaar, between Maschara and Nasej.

The division later fought in the Iran–Iraq War. Tanks and mechanized units of the 3rd Armoured Division moved into Khorramshahr on September 30, 1980, in the opening stages of the first battle for the city. One force moved in to occupy a slaughterhouse, another to take the railway station, and another to secure the Dej barracks in the Taleqani district. The Islamic Revolutionary Guards awaited the Iraqis with light weapons, rocket propelled grenades, and Molotov cocktails. It was in the suburbs that the Iraqi attack stalled when they encountered Chieftain tanks. Local counterattacks by Pasdaran anti-tank teams turned back the Iraqi forces at several points. Later reports indicated infighting amongst Iraqi units, a sign of weakness of poorly trained conscripts. The sheer weight of the Iraqi tank force was effective against the anti-tank teams, but when Iranian armour was encountered, it stopped attacks cold. After fierce fighting, the Iraqis briefly occupied the slaughterhouse and the railway station, but were pushed back to previous positions on the outskirts of the city. Commander of the division Brig. Gen. Juwad Asaad was among the commanders executed by Saddam Hussein due to heavy losses in Operation Jerusalem launched by Iran.

The division also fought in Persian Gulf War, operations in the 1990s, and the 2003 invasion of Iraq. Just before the Iraq War, it was part of the 2nd Corps, on the Iranian border. It comprised the 6th Armoured Brigade, 12th Armoured Brigade, and 8th Mechanised Brigade. It was disbanded when the Iraqi Armed Forces were formally dissolved by Coalition Provisional Authority Order Number 2.

=== After the U.S. invasion, 2003 ===
After its reformation post-2003, the division was headquartered at Al Kisik. Its units were part of the original three division New Iraqi Army. As of January 2005, the division was commanded by Maj. Gen. Khursheed Saleem Hassan.

A graduation process "in mid-March 2005 at An Numaniyah included soldiers of the 13th Battalion, 5th Brigade, 3rd Division. The graduation in conjunction with soldiers from the 14th, and 15th battalions" totalled 3,000 new soldiers. "With the reorganization of the Iraqi Army the 13th Battalion was redesignated the 1st Battalion, 2nd Brigade, 2nd Division."

The "clearing of Tal Afar in September 2005" - the Battle of Tal Afar (2005) - was one of the first major operations for the new division. "Tal Afar had been used by al-Qaeda in Iraq as a staging ground for foreign fighters entering Iraq since early 2005. The [U.S.] 3d Armored Reconnaissance Regiment (sic - 3d Armored Cavalry Regiment, 3d ACR), under Colonel H. R. McMaster, and two brigades of the 3rd Iraqi Army Division carried out the assault on the city. McMaster had directed that civilians be evacuated from the town in order to allow his forces to use artillery and attack helicopters to overcome insurgent makeshift fortifications. Groups of perhaps hundreds of insurgents massed to counterattack the advancing U.S. and Iraqi forces,"

The 3rd Division was transferred from Coalition control to the Iraqi Ground Forces Command on 1 December 2006.

In 2014, the 6th Brigade of the 3rd Division was described as 'the first line of Mosul's defence' against ISIS. Reuters said that 'On paper, the brigade had 2,500 men. The reality was closer to 500. The brigade was also short of weapons and ammunition, according to one non-commissioned officer. Infantry, armour and tanks had been shifted to Anbar, where more than 6,000 soldiers had been killed and another 12,000 had deserted. It left Mosul with virtually no tanks and a shortage of artillery,' according to Lieutenant General Mahdi Al-Gharrawi, commander of the Ninewa Operational Command.

Jane's Defence Weekly's 30 July account of the Iraqi Army's poor performance against ISIS during the offensive in Northern Iraq during June 2014 said the division, by then comprising the 6th, 9th, 10th, and 11th Brigades, had almost totally dissolved or been destroyed in fighting. The exception appeared to be the 4th Battalion of the 10th Brigade, which had been defending a position outside Tall Afar in early July 2014.

== Subordinate units ==
- Division Headquarters
- 6th Motorised Brigade
- 9th Motorised Brigade
- 10th Motorised Brigade ('Desert Lions')
- 11th Motorised Brigade
- 3rd Motor Transport Regiment?

== See also ==
- Quwat Salahaddin, the 3rd Division's football team from 1957 until 1975
