= Islamic State invasion of Iraq =

Islamic State offensive into Iraq in June 2014

Coordinates: 36.3372°N 43.1358°E

- Part of the War in Iraq (2013–2017)
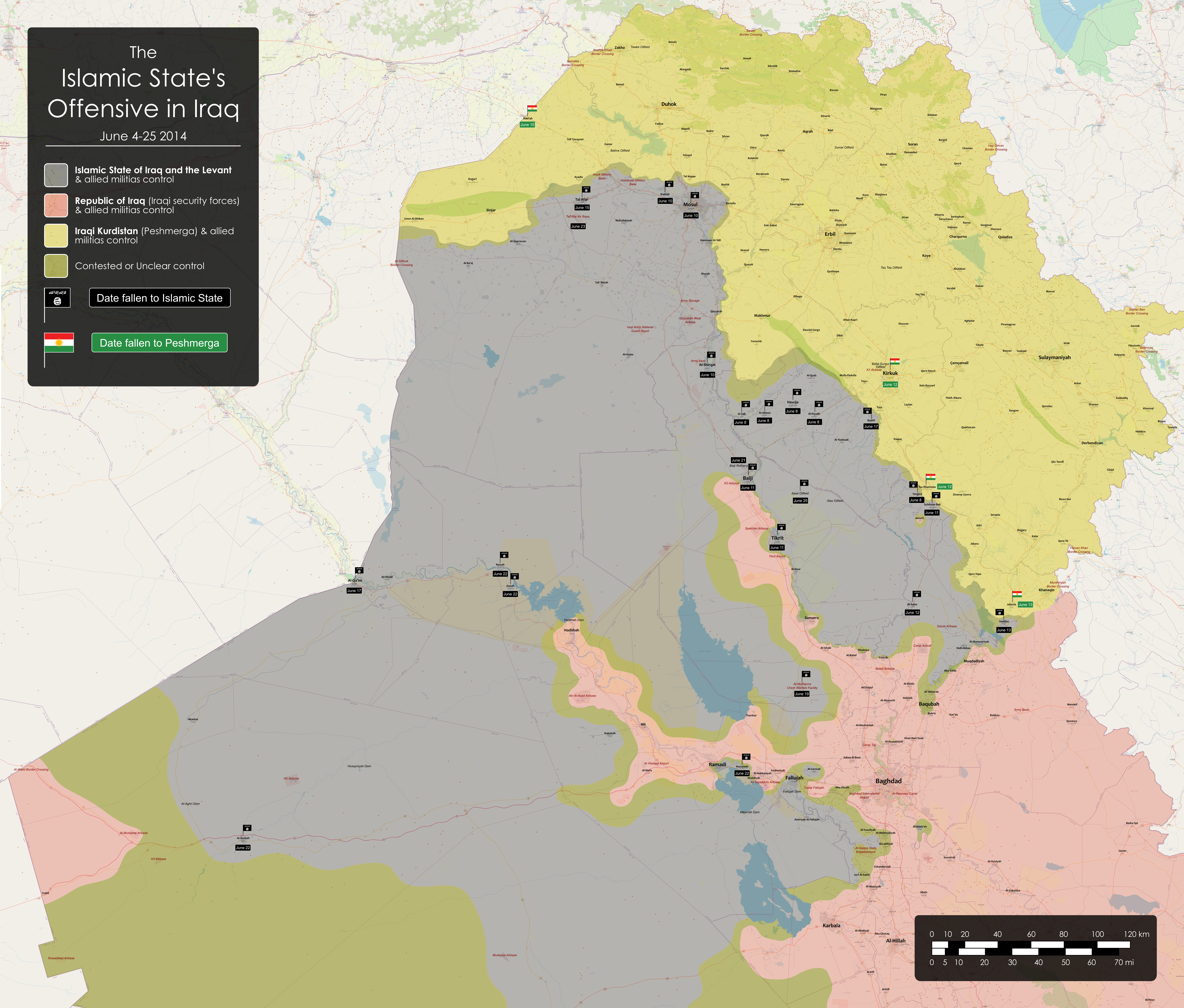
- Map of the offensive
Date	4–25 June 2014 (2 weeks and 6 days)
Location	Nineveh, Kirkuk, Baghdad, Saladin, and Diyala Governorates
Result	Major Islamic State victory: 2nd, 3rd, 4th Iraqi Army divisions destroyed; Self-proclaimed Islamic State Caliphate proclaimed, with Abu Bakr al-Baghdadi named as the caliph; Genocide of Yazidis by the Islamic State, persecution of Christians and Shia Muslims by the Islamic State; Iraqi forces and allies launch a massive counter-offensive to recapture lost territory, beginning in early 2015 and lasting until 2017.
Territorial changes	Iraqi government loses significant territories in northern Iraq to the Islamic State, including the region from Mosul to Tikrit and Tal Afar along with parts of Kirkuk and Diyala governorates.; Islamic State arrives within 25 kilometers (15 miles) from the centre of the capital city Baghdad.; A brief government counter-offensive shortly following the offensive leads to the recapture of territory north and west of Baghdad.; Kurdish forces take control of Kirkuk, parts of northern Nineveh and north-eastern Diyala from withdrawing federal Iraqi forces.

Belligerents
Republic of Iraq: Security forces; Iraqi Volunteer Forces; Shi'ite private militias; Syriac Military Council; Qaraqosh Protection Committee; Nineveh Plain Protection Units; Syria (limited involvement): Syrian Air Force; Iran Supported by: United States; Russia Kurdistan Region: Peshmerga; Kurdistan Workers' Party (PKK)	Islamic State of Iraq and the Levant Naqshbandi Army; GMCIR

Commanders and leaders
Nouri al-Maliki; Abboud Qanbar; Babaker Zebari; Ali Ghaidan; Mahdi Al-Gharrawi; Sabah Al-Fatlawi; Qasem Soleimani Masoud Barzani; Jaafar Sheikh Mustafa; Sirwan Barzani Bahoz Erdal	Abu Bakr al-Baghdadi (Islamic State) Abu Ali al-Anbari (Islamic State) Abu Muslim al-Turkmani (Islamic State) Abu Abdulrahman al-Bilawi †; Amir Mohammed Abdul Rahman al-Mawli al-Salbi Izzat Ibrahim al-Douri (JRTN)

Strength
250,000 federal soldiers 10,000 federal police 30,000 local police 2,000 Iranian Quds Force; 1,000 U.S. troops 190,000 Kurdish peshmerga	Islamic State of Iraq and the Levant: 7,000+ JRTN: 1,500+

Casualties and losses
Iraq: 10,000+ killed (1,566 executed); 90,000 deserted 1,900 captured Iran: 4 killed	Islamic State: 3,106 killed
- 1,235–1,265 civilians killed (by 25 June) 1,000,000+ displaced 95 Turkish civilians taken prisoner

In June 2014, the Islamic State of Iraq and the Levant (also known as ISIL or ISIS), which had controlled a large portion of Northeastern Syria at that time during the Syrian civil war, launched a widespread offensive in Iraq, capturing a large swath of territory extending all the way from the Iraq–Syria border to the outskirts of the Iraqi capital city of Baghdad. The offensive came after months of clashes in Anbar province, where tribal groups, and some extremist factions—which had pledged allegiance to ISIL—had been fighting Iraqi government forces in the cities of Fallujah and Ramadi following a series of anti-government protests. The offensive led to the occupation of 40% of Iraq's territory by the Islamic State, the collapse of several elements of the then-corrupt Iraqi Army and the genocides and mass killings of various religious groups, such as the Yazidis, Christians and Shia Muslims (who form a majority in the country). This event led to the intervention of Iran and the United States in assisting Iraq in its conflict with the Islamic State, with the latter providing assistance to both federal and Kurdish forces.

The Islamic State of Iraq and the Levant and its allies captured several cities and surrounding territory, beginning with an attack on Samarra on 4 June, followed by the seizure of Mosul on 10 June, and Tikrit on 11 June. As Iraqi government forces fled south on 13 June, Kurdistan Regional Government force's took control of the oil hub of Kirkuk, part of the disputed territories of Northern Iraq.

The Islamic State of Iraq and the Levant called the battles of Mosul and Saladin Governorate "the Battle of the Lion of God al-Bilawi" (Arabic: غزوة أسد الله البيلاوي), in honor of Abu Abdulrahman al-Bilawi.

A former commander of the Iraqi ground forces, Ali Ghaidan, accused former Prime Minister of Iraq, Nouri al-Maliki of being the one who issued the order to withdraw from the city of Mosul.

By late June, the Iraqi government had lost control of its borders with both Jordan and Syria. Prime Minister of Iraq Nouri al-Maliki called for a national state of emergency on 10 June following the attack on Mosul, which had been seized overnight. However, despite the security crisis, Iraq's parliament did not allow Maliki to declare a state of emergency; many Sunni Arab and Kurdish legislators boycotted the session because they opposed expanding the prime minister's powers.

== Background ==
Beginning in December 2013, clashes involving tribal militias, Iraqi security forces, and the Islamic State of Iraq and the Levant (ISIL) had been occurring throughout western Iraq. In early January 2014, ISIL militia successfully took control of Fallujah and Ramadi, bringing much of Al Anbar Governorate under their control. Afterwards, the Iraqi Army began conducting an offensive against the Anbar region, the stronghold of ISIL, with the stated goal of bringing the region under government control. Prior to conducting this counter offensive, Iraqi Prime Minister Nouri al-Maliki gave a controversial speech in which he charactized the military campaign as a continuation of the ancient sectarian war between "the followers of Hussein and the followers of Yazid", a reference to a 7th-century defining battle for Shi'ites, thereby alienating the Sunnis of Anbar who had prior collaborated with the Iraqi government.

The advances ISIL made in neighboring Syria—a source of their weapons—substantially strengthened their position. In early June, insurgents began to advance up over to central and northern part of Iraqi land following the Iraqi Army's capture in the Anbar industrial zone. At that point, they were still in control of most of Fallujah and Garmah, as well as parts of Haditha, Jurf Al Sakhar, Anah, Abu Ghraib and several smaller settlements in Al Anbar Governorate.

On 29 June 2014, ISIL announced a change of name to Islamic State, and declared a 'Caliphate' that includes Syria and Iraq. They then declared Abu Bakr al-Baghdadi as the "Caliph" (leader of all Sunni Muslims).

== Possible causes ==
Some trace the beginnings of the offensive to the Syrian civil war which gave ISIL and other Sunni jihadi groups a cause and a battlefield when it looked like their campaign in Iraq was in decline while critics of the US-led invasion of Iraq in 2003 believe the root of these events should trace back to unsuccessful nation-building as well as sectarian and ethnic division in the aftermath of Saddam Hussein's removal from power. U.S. Foreign policy on Iraq under the Barack Obama administration had shifted, and there had been a withrawal of U.S. troops and military presence. Anne-Marie Slaughter wrote that had Obama forcibly intervened in the Syrian civil war, it "could have stopped the carnage spreading today in Syria and in Iraq," while Fareed Zakaria, editor of Time and former Middle Eastern policy advisor for the Bush administration, alleged that counterproductive western intervention in Iraq and Syria served to accelerate sectarian infighting in both countries and empowered radicals on all sides. The Financial Times described the conflicts spanning Iraq and Syria as religious wars akin to Europe's Thirty Years' War.

According to the Iraq's government critics, the pro-Shia policies of al-Maliki have been considered one of the main reasons of alienation Sunni Arabs and Kurds, which has played a significant role in the deterioration of security and the reemergence of Sunni extremists. Conversely, al-Maliki has accused Saudi Arabia of backing the militants of ISIL, who want to carve out a Sunni caliphate in the heart of the Middle East. This view was supported by writers in Foreign Policy magazine and The Daily Beast who asserted that the Saudi government, viewing the political ascendancy of Iraq's Shia populace as a threat, elected to provide the Sunni opposition with arms. Michael Weiss traces the origins of ISIL to Ansar al-Islam's infiltration of Iraqi Kurdistan through Iran prior to the invasion of Iraq, and further cites a variety of evidence to claim that Syrian officials intentionally abetted the rise of ISIL to damage the reputation of moderate Syrian rebels.

The Iraqi army which took responsibility for holding northern Iraq, collapsed when militants including ISIL and its allies, with less than 1,000 militants, attacked and seized Mosul and Tikrit easily. The Iraqi army ceded control of Kirkuk to the Kurdish Peshmerga. There are different reasons offered for this event. According to The Guardian, one scenario is that the three Iraqi generals responsible for Mosul, Tikrit, and Kirkuk didn't want to fight for a state that wasn't working. According to The Daily Telegraph, the other view is that the generals in the military headquarters of these cities had shared the same Ba'athist ideology and were the first to flee. Another scenario is that the Iraqi troops quickly realized they were no match for battle-hardened and ideologically motivated jihadis heading their way. A third theory is that the Kurds had long ago lost faith in prime minister Nouri al-Maliki's ability to serve either their interests or those of Iraq.

Washington Institute for Near East Policy analyst Michael Knights noted that mutual opposition to the Shia-led government allowed for an alliance between the hitherto ideologically opposed ISIL and secular Ba'ath influenced insurgents such as the Naqshbandi order. Coordination between both groups granted ISIL the assistance of underground networks of former military, insurgents, Sunni officials and tribal groups sympathetic to the Ba'ath era government, thereby allowing a relatively small number of militants to execute a "coup" in Sunni regions where the banned Ba'ath party still retains a degree of support. The presence of Naqshbandi, MCIR and other secular insurgent groups led to tribes and some Awakening Councils opposed to ISIL supporting the insurrection. Additionally, Knights reported that in the years preceding the insurrection, the Naqshbandi led by Izzat Ibrahim al-Douri aggressively forged ties to elements of Sunni civil society opposed to the Maliki government, encouraged the establishment of protest camps at sites including Hawija and attempted to co-opt Sunni militia. The arrival of ISIL militants from Syria ultimately serving as the final catalyst behind a broader revolt.

== Offensive ==
=== Assault on Samarra ===
On 4 and 5 June 2014, ISIL militants attacked and captured parts of the city of Samarra. The ISIL operatives blew up a police station south of Samara overnight, killing several policemen, before they advanced on the city in pick-up trucks, raiding checkpoints along the way. They entered the city from the east and west and quickly captured the municipality building, university and the two largest mosques. The insurgents had reached to within 2 kilometres (1.2 mi) from the Al-Askari Mosque, which was defended by three security belts. Militants targeted command centres near the shrine. Soon, government reinforcements were sent from Baghdad and the military managed to regain control of the city, pushing militant forces out of Samarra. 12 policemen and several civilians were killed in the fighting, while an army official claimed 80 militants also died.

=== Fall of Mosul and push into Kirkuk ===
Map showing the Islamic State's offensive in Northern Iraq, June 2014

On 6 June, ISIL attacked Mosul from the northwest and quickly entered the western part of the city. The ISIL forces numbered approximately 1,500, while there were at least 15 times more Iraqi forces. The assault started at 02:30 in the morning when ISIL convoys of pickup trucks advancing from the west shot their way through the two-man checkpoints into the city. By 03:30, street fighting was raging in Mosul. In southern Mosul, five suicide bombers attacked an arms depot killing 11 soldiers. Two suicide bombers also killed six people in the village of Muaffakiya, near Mosul. Heavy fighting continued in the city the next day. Over the two days, 61 militants, 41 government troops and seven civilians were killed.

As the militants advanced they seized military vehicles and weapons and reportedly hanged soldiers and lit them ablaze, crucified them, and torched them on the hoods of Humvees. On the western edge of Tamoz 17 neighborhood, police from the Fourth Battalion made a stand against the insurgents as government forces were order to form a defensive line to cordon off the besieged western Mosul neighborhoods from the Tigris River.

While fighting raged in Mosul, on 8 June, a double bomb attack, including a suicide bomber, against the Kurdish PUK party office in the town of Jalawla left 18 people dead, most of them members of the Kurdish security forces. At the same time, ISIL advanced to the east of Mosul, capturing the Hawija, Al Zab, Riyadh, and Abbasi areas west of the city of Kirkuk, and Rashad and Yankaja to its south after government forces retreated.

By this time, insurgents surged into Mosul, sleeper cells hiding in the city had been activated and neighbourhoods rallied to them. The insurgents bombed a police station in the al-Uraybi neighbourhood and charged into the area around the Mosul Hotel, on the western bank of the Tigris, where a battle post was set up for 30 police SWAT members.

The next day, ISIL forces executed 15 security forces members captured near Kirkuk. Four days later, on 13 June, in the eastern part of the province, Kurdish military forces (Peshmerga) advanced and took the city of Kirkuk, after government forces abandoned their posts in the face of the ISIL offensive, expanding the Kurdish zone of control in Northern Iraq. Kurdish forces then awaited further orders before moving towards the areas controlled by ISIL. A Peshmerga spokesman said, "The whole of Kirkuk has fallen into the hands of Peshmerga, no Iraqi army remains in Kirkuk now." Ten tanks and dozens of Humvee vehicles that had been abandoned by the Army were seized by Kurdish forces.

By the afternoon of 9 June on Mosul's front, some 40 members of the Fourth Police Battalion were among the last local police fighting to hold back the jihadists in western Mosul. The rest had either defected or deserted. At 04:30 in the afternoon, a military water tanker, rigged with explosives, raced towards the Mosul Hotel where the policemen were stationed. The subsequent explosion wounded the battalion's commander, Colonel Dhiyab Ahmed al-Assi al-Obeidi, whose leg was ripped open by the blast. Other police officers then transported him by boat across the river. This attack broke the defensive line in the west of the city.

That night, generals Abboud Qanbar and Ali Ghaidan decided to withdraw across the river, leaving Lieutenant General Mahdi al-Gharrawi, the operational commander of Nineveh Governorate, at his command post without any orders. Ghaidan and Qanbar's retreating convoy created the impression that Iraq's security forces were deserting and so Iraqi Army soldiers started to flee Mosul. The 2nd Division had deserted the city within a few hours and both Ghaidan and Qanbar arrived in Kurdistan the next day.

On the morning of 10 June, Gharawi and 26 of his men, who were still at the operation command centre in the western part of the city, decided to fight their way across a bridge to eastern Mosul. On the east bank, their five vehicles were set ablaze and after coming under heavy fire, during which three of the soldiers were killed, it was every man for himself, as Gharawi said. In the east, Gharawi and three of his men commandeered an armoured vehicle with flat tires and headed north to safety. The militants were in control of much of the city by midday on 10 June. The militants seized numerous facilities, including Mosul International Airport, which had served as a hub for the U.S. military in the region. It was thought all aircraft located there had been captured, including helicopters and jet fighters. The militants also claimed to have released at least 2,400 prisoners, after seizing police stations and prisons across the city. However, after the takeover of Badush prison near Mosul, ISIL separated and removed the Sunni inmates, while the remaining 670 prisoners were executed. At the end of 10 June, ISIL was considered to be in control of Mosul.

On 11 June, ISIL members seized the Turkish consulate in Mosul and kidnapped 48 Turkish citizens including the consul general, three children and several members of the Turkish Special Forces. Reports suggested the abductees were taken to a nearby militant base and were unharmed. An unnamed Turkish official confirmed the government was in contact with the insurgents, while Prime Minister Recep Tayyip Erdoğan held an emergency meeting with members of the National Intelligence Organization (MIT) and Deputy Prime Minister Beşir Atalay to discuss the situation. The daring assault came a day after 28 Turkish truck drivers were abducted by militants while delivering fuel to a power plant in Mosul. Earlier that day, the governor of Ninawa Governate, Atheel al-Nujaifi, accused the military commanders that were in Mosul of abandoning the battlefield and fleeing from the city. The governor demanded that they be tried in a military court. He also stated that it was not just ISIL that captured Mosul but that other small militias had provided support in capturing the city. On 20 September 2014 the hostages captured on 11 June 2014 from the Turkish consulate in Mosul were released.

ISIL seized large quantities of US-supplied military equipment. It also freed thousands of prisoners, many of whom likely joined the insurgency.

There were conflicting reports about the east bank of Mosul, which has a significant population of Assyrians, Kurds, Turkmens, Shabaks and Armenians, with some suggesting it was controlled by Kurdish Peshmergas while according to others it was ISIL-controlled.

Sources within the Iraq government allege that in the months preceding the assault, Ba'ath loyalists led by al-Douri had been in contact with disaffected Sunni officers who either defected or withdrew upon the ISIL-Ba'ath attack. While speaking to the charity Aid to the Church in Need, Chaldean Catholic Church Archbishop of Mosul Amel Nona stated "Mosul's last remaining Christians had left now a city which until 2003 was home to 35,000 faithful."

=== Conquest of Baiji and Tikrit ===
On 11 June, insurgents advanced into the oil refinery town of Baiji, seizing the main court house and police station and setting them on fire. The militants, who were travelling in a group of around 60 vehicles, also took control of the Baiji prison and freed all the inmates. Local residents told members of the media that ISIL sent a group of local tribal chiefs ahead of them to convince the 250 guards at the oil plant to withdraw, while soldiers and police had been warned to leave as well. Later in the day, militants reportedly retreated from Baiji, either due to persuasion from local tribal leaders or due to reinforcements from the Iraqi Army's Fourth Armored Division arriving in the city. However, the next day it was confirmed ISIL was still in control of the town, except the refinery which was surrounded.

Continuing their offensive, on the evening of 11 June, insurgents took full control of the city of Tikrit, the hometown of former president Saddam Hussein and the second provincial capital to fall in two days. Local officials reported that checkpoints had been set up around the city, while at least 300 inmates had been freed from the city's prisons, many of them serving sentences under terrorism charges. Two police stations were burned down and a military base was captured. ISIL forces had also reached Samarra and were fighting government troops at the city's northwest entrance.

At this point, Iraqi government officials described the situation as a "strategic disaster" for the Iraqi government and army.

=== Advance towards Baghdad and into Diyala ===
On 12 June, ISIL continued their advance towards Baghdad, the capital and largest city of Iraq, moving into towns just an hour's drive from the city. It controlled parts of the small town of Udhaim, 90 km (60 miles) north of Baghdad, after most of the army troops left their positions and withdrew towards the nearby town of Al Khalis in Diyala Governorate. ISIL also captured ten towns in Saladin Governorate, but not Tuz Khurmatu, Dujail, Balad, Samarra or Amirli. Samarra had reportedly become surrounded by ISIL forces.

Meanwhile, an Iraqi Border Patrol battalion stationed along the Syrian border in the western Anbar Governorate abandoned its positions in the face of advancing ISIL forces to break out to the relative safety of the Kurdish-controlled town of Sinjar in Nineveh. However, the convoy of 60 trucks and hundreds of border police were thrown into disarray and panic when a small force of ISIL vehicles attacked them en route. By the time Kurdish forces arrived, the police force had been completely routed, with an unknown number of killed and captured, while others fled into the desert, leaving all their vehicles behind. Only two policemen managed to arrive at Sinjar on foot.

In the early hours of 13 June, ISIL seized two towns in Diyala Governorate, after security forces abandoned their posts in Sadiyah and Jalawla. Several villages around the Hamrin Mountains were also captured. At the same time, Kurdish forces entered Jalawla to secure offices of Kurdish parties in the town.

=== Government counter-attack ===
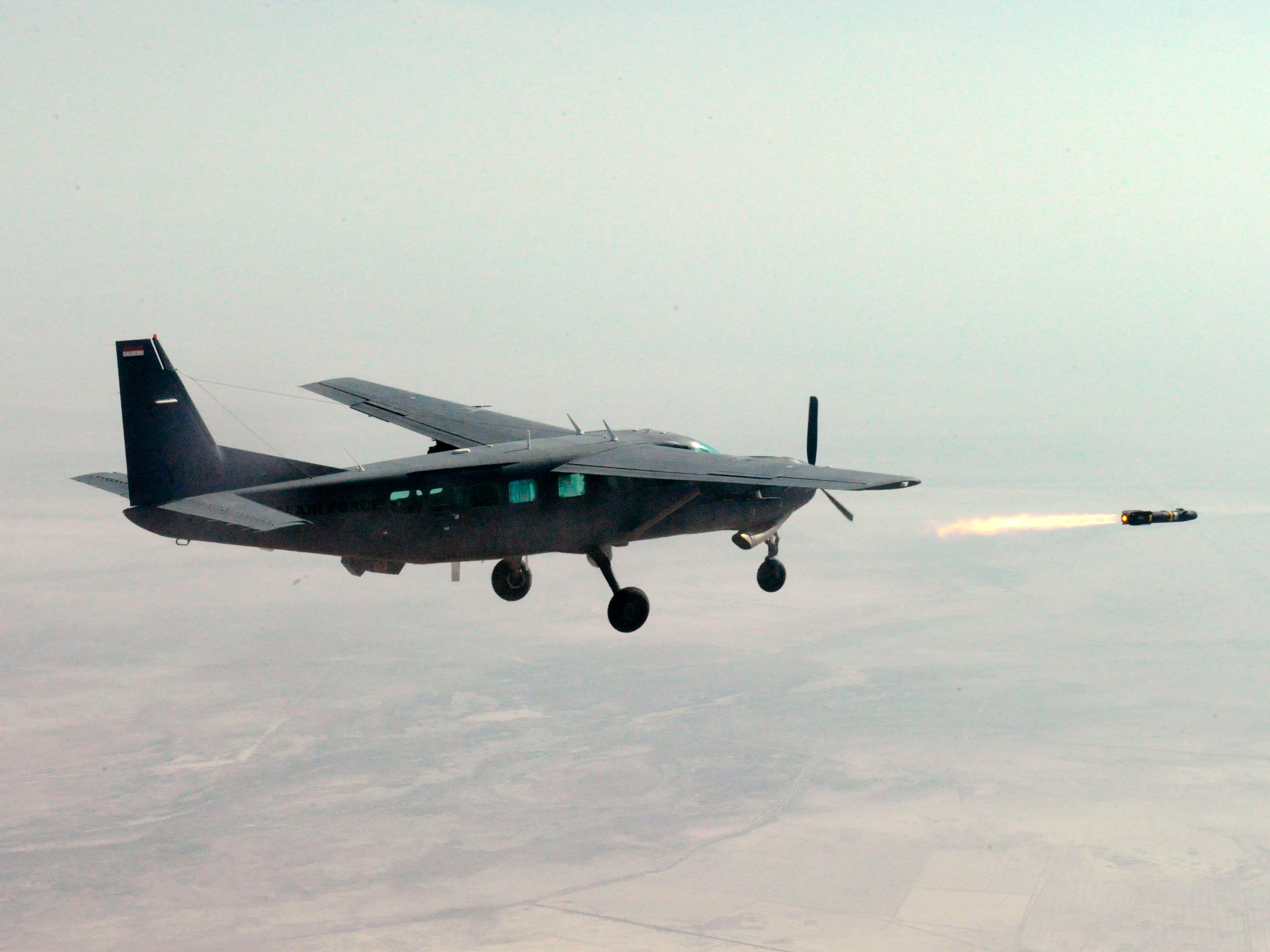
An Iraqi Air Force AC-208 firing a Hellfire missile during a training exercise in 2010.

On 13 June 2014, Iraqi forces supported by elements of the Quds Force and Iranian Revolutionary Guards had gathered in the town of Samarra and claimed to have regained control of parts of Saladin Governorate, namely the town of Dhuluiyah. Journalists from Al-Monitor embedded in Mosul and Tikrit reported that repeated airstrikes by the government made ISIL militants depart from conspicuous positions within the cities. In their place, militants associated with the Naqshbandi Army and other anti-government groups led by former Ba'ath officers assumed the visible role of patrolling and administration. Militants were reported to have appointed former Ba'ath generals Azhar al-Obeidi and Ahmed Abdul Rashid as the governors of Mosul and Tikrit. Sunni militants remained in control of Tikrit and its strategically significant COB Speicher military base and air field. Insurgents in Tikrit were reported to be mining the roads leading into the city and positioning artillery to resist an anticipated siege.

According to The Guardian newspaper, the call to arms by the highest Shia authority in Iraq, Grand Ayatollah Ali Sistani, on 13 June mobilized in less than one day around a division of militiamen who, unlike the military, would not run from a fight with the insurgents.

On 14 June, Al-Maliki went to Samarra and declared "Samarra will be the starting point, the gathering station of our troops to cleanse every inch that was desecrated by footsteps of those traitors." There were conflicting reports about the situation of al-Dhuluiya, outside of Samarra. Government officials and state TV claimed that Iraqi security forces had taken control of the town, but security officials in Samarra and witnesses there told CNN the town was still under ISIL control.

The same day, the Iraqi military attacked ISIL forces in al-Mutasim, 22 kilometres (14 mi) south-east of Samarra, driving militants out into the surrounding desert. Meanwhile, the bodies of 128 Iraqi soldiers and policemen killed in clashes with ISIL were received by medical staff in Mosul.

Also, it was reported that the Iraqi Army had killed seven Kurdish security forces in an airstrike in Diyala. Jabbar Yawar, the secretary general of the Peshmerga, said talks with Iraqi authorities were under way to ascertain what had happened. The next day, the military recaptured Ishaqi where the burned bodies of 12 policemen were found.

On 28 June, Iraqi forces launched an attack against the city of Tikrit.

=== Renewed ISIL advance ===
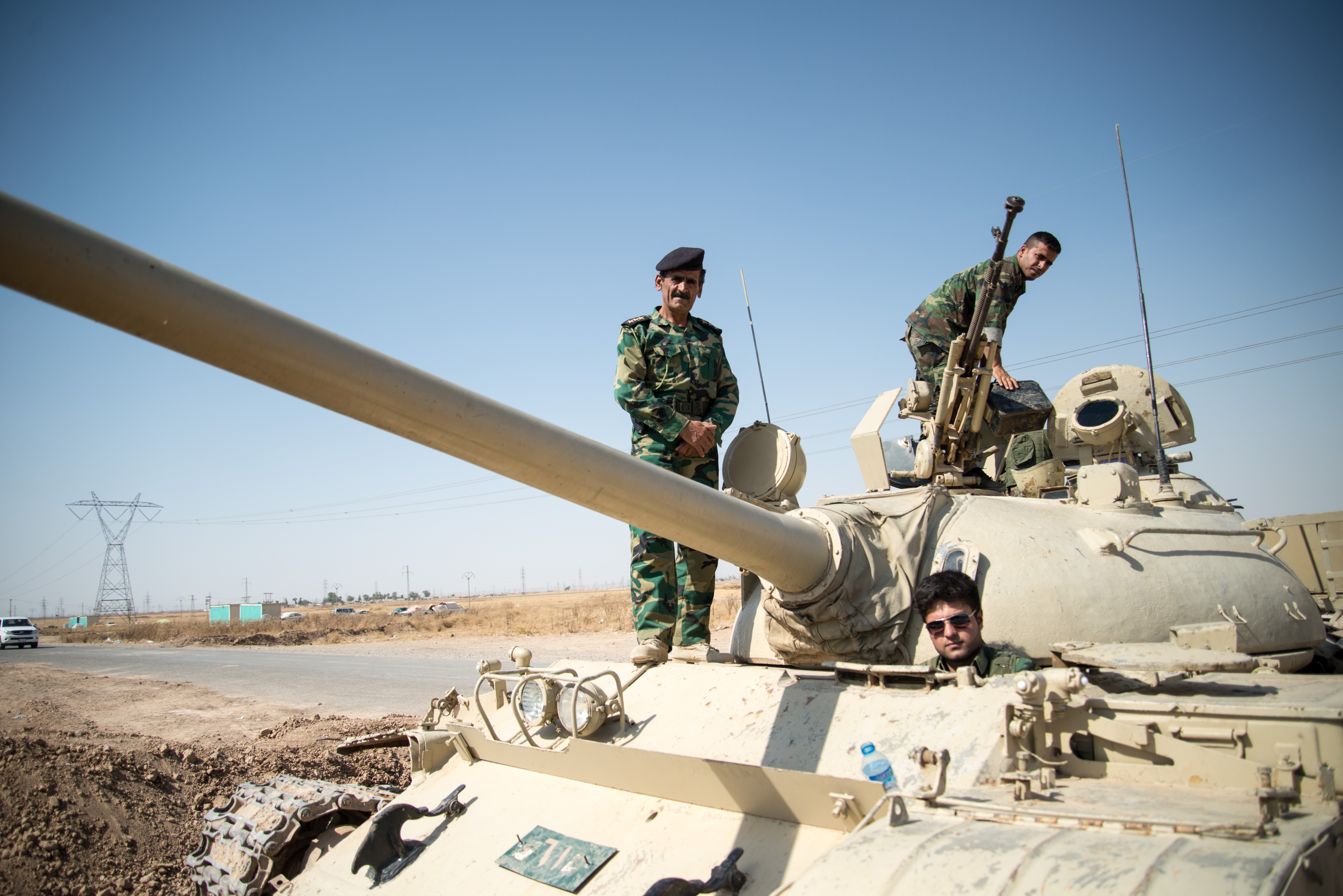
Peshmerga T-55 tank outside Kirkuk on 19 June 2014.

Late on 15 June, after repeated assaults, an insurgent assault, primarily led by the Naqshbandi Army and former Ba'athists, captured Tal Afar and its nearby airbase The defenders, composed largely of Shia Turkmen and soldiers retreating from Mosul, escaped to Kurdish-controlled territory. During the fighting for Tal Afar, 18 militants died, and ten people were killed in the insurgent shelling of the town. The local security garrison suffered heavy casualties, but the number was unknown. It was also claimed that Major General Abu Al-Waleed was captured at Tal Afar, but he allegedly later denied this on state TV. During that day, rebels made claims of executing 1,000–1,800 captured soldiers, while the military claimed the Air Force had killed 279 militants in the previous 24 hours. Analysis of execution videos by military experts managed to confirm the killing of at least 170 soldiers.

On 15 June, ISIL also advanced further into Diyala Governorate gaining control of two villages in ʿAdhaim, northeast of Baghdad. The next day, 28–29 Iraqi Shiite volunteer militiamen were killed in an ambush of their convoy south of Samarra by ISIL. Meanwhile, the military claimed to have killed 56 insurgents in areas of western and southern Baghdad, while fighting in Diyala Governorate left 29 militants and eight soldiers dead. A number of soldiers were also captured. The first Iranian soldier was also killed. In addition, Tal Afar fell on 16 June to ISIL forces led by Amir Mohammed Abdul Rahman al-Mawli al-Salbi.

West of Baghdad, ISIL captured Saqlawiyah where army helicopters were hovering over the town to provide cover for retreating troops. During the fighting a helicopter was shot down. In the evening, police executed 44 Sunni prisoners at a police station in Baqubah before retreating due to an advance by ISIL forces which captured several neighborhoods in the city. Conflicting information has been presented regarding the number killed and the identity of those responsible, as the Washington Post reported that the prisoners were either killed during a battle with ISIL or "preemptively" by security forces. The situation regarding the killing of a Sunni imam in Baghdad is also unclear.

On 17 June, according to BBC the Army had retaken the captured districts of Baqubah. Elsewhere, security forces withdrew from the Al-Qa'im border crossing as rebels from the Free Syrian Army and al-Nusra Front crossed the border and took hold of it. Also, east of Samarra, the bodies of 18 executed security force members were discovered.

On 18 June, ISIL attacked Iraq's largest oil refinery in Baiji with mortars and machine guns. An official from inside the refinery stated the militants had captured 75 percent of the facility, while a military spokesman claimed the attack had been repelled with 40 insurgents being killed. Meanwhile, rebels overran three villages in Salaheddin Governorate following fighting that left some 20 civilians dead. Also, India said that 40 of its nationals, who were working for a Turkish construction company in Mosul, had been abducted by militants. At the same time, Rauf Rashid Abd al-Rahman, the presiding judge during the trial of Saddam Hussein, was reportedly captured and executed by insurgents, though that was later denied by family members and the Kurdistan Regional Government.

On 19 June, government forces claimed to have regained full control of the Baiji oil refinery, after heavy fighting with ISIL fighters that left 100 militants dead. An Iraqi witness who drove past the Baiji refinery told the Associated Press that ISIL had hung their banners from the watch towers and created checkpoints surrounding the facility, despite government claims of control. By the evening, the two sides held different parts of the refinery. The same day, ISIL captured the Al Muthanna Chemical Weapons Facility near Lake Tharthar, 45 miles northwest of Baghdad, in an area which was firmly come under rebel control by this point.

On 20 June, the oil refinery was still surrounded by ISIL forces and had once again come under attack. By the evening, US officials had told ABC News that the 270 Iraqi troops trapped in the refinery were outnumbered and outgunned. And, with ISIL in control of the roads to and from Baiji, there was little chance of their resources being replenished. The militants planned to wait until the troops ran out of food and ammunition. On the same day, ISIL claimed to have captured most of the Tal Afar airport. Kurdish forces, who were accompanied by a BBC news crew, became surrounded by ISIL on three sides in Jalula and later it was confirmed the control of the town was divided between the Kurds and ISIL.

On 21 June, militants captured the Baiji oil refinery after overnight clashes with government forces. On the same day, Iraqi Shia militias rallied all over Iraq to show their strength. The largest rally was in Baghdad in which thousands of members of Shia militia Promised Day Brigades participated. Also, ISIL clashed with allied Sunni militants, leaving 17 dead in Hawija.

On 23 June, insurgents captured the Tal Afar airport and secured the town itself. Iraqi security sources confirmed for the first time the Baiji oil refinery had been seized by militants, after being attacked for several days. 400 soldiers of the 37th Brigade, including its officers, deserted from the refinery following an agreement reached with tribal leaders per which the troops had free passage to leave for 24 hours. 50–75 police commandos, who refused to desert, attempted to prevent the Brigade's desertion at gunpoint but were outnumbered by the soldiers and backed down. This left the insurgents in control of virtually the entire facility, except one compound where the refinery's operating systems are located due to the SWAT members barricading themselves in the building. A standoff ensued as the insurgents didn't want to risk a direct assault for fear of damaging the facilities systems. Instead, ISIL decided to slowly starve out the commandos if they refused to surrender, since no reinforcements could be flown in to the SWAT unit due to the heavy insurgent anti-aircraft fire around the refinery. The siege of the building continued as of mid-July.

By this point, sources reported that a combination of desertions, casualties and loss of equipment crippled the regular Iraqi military, forcing the government to increasingly rely on volunteers drawn from Shia militias. Iraqi officials also conceded they had essentially given up on the north of the country to the insurgent forces.

On 24 June, the Syrian Arab Republic launched its first airstrikes in Iraqi territory after previously targeting Syrian-Iraqi border crossings controlled by ISIL. Syria launched new strikes the next day when at least 50 people were killed and 132 others wounded, including civilians, after missiles launched by Syrian fighters hit a municipal building, a market, and a bank in Al Rutba. It was unclear whether the Syrian fighters actually entered Iraqi territory when they made the airstrikes.

On 25 June, anonymous American officials reported that Iran set up a special control centre at Al-Rasheed Air Base in Baghdad and was flying a "small fleet" of Ababil drones over Iraq, and an Iranian signals intelligence unit had also been deployed at the airfield to intercept electronic communications between ISIL fighters and commanders. 10 divisions of Iranian and Quds Force troops were massed on the Iran–Iraq border and about two dozen Iranian aircraft had been stationed in western Iran. Meanwhile, insurgents overran the Ajeel oil site, east of Tikrit, after the nearby town of al-Alam was seized by the militants and insurgents surrounded on three sides the massive Balad air base, also known as Joint Base Balad and "Camp Anaconda" under U.S. occupation, and struck it with mortars.

== Aftermath ==
=== Army Tikrit counter-offensive ===
On 26 June, government forces launched an airborne assault on Tikrit and an all-out ground offensive two days later in an attempt to recapture the city. However, by 30 June the assault had stalled and government troops pulled back from Tikrit to the south, after meeting stiff resistance, in an attempt to regroup.

Also during this time, on the morning of 26 June, militants captured the town of Mansouriyat al-Jabal, which is the home to four natural gas fields, although government forces managed to recapture the town the next day. They also reportedly recaptured al-Alam.

On 4 July, the ISIL published a video claiming its leader, Abu Bakr al-Baghdadi, delivered a sermon for half an hour during Friday prayers at the Great Mosque of al-Nuri Mosul, Iraq. "Iraqi agencies are still investigating the video and comparing it with its intelligence," Iraq's military spokesman, Lt. Gen. Qassim Atta, said on 7 July. On the other hand, the United States "has no reason to doubt" the authenticity of a video that purports to show ISIL leader.

On 15 July, the military launched a new assault on Tikrit from Awja. However, by the next day, government troops had been repelled and once again retreated. Several security force's vehicles were seen abandoned, with at least one of them burnt out.

On 17 July, insurgents launched an assault on Camp Speicher, near Tikrit, in an attempt to capture the air base. However, by 21 July, the attack had reportedly been repelled.

=== August ISIL offensive ===
In early August 2014, ISIL launched a new offensive against Kurdish-held territory in northern Iraq and within days captured the town of Sinjar, displacing its Yazidi population. ISIL had also advanced to within 40 kilometers from the Kurdish capital of Erbil. This prompted the United States to start launching air-strikes on advancing ISIL forces.

== Consequences ==
=== Proclamation of a Caliphate ===
On 29 June 2014, ISIL announced its name change to the Islamic State and announced the formation of a 'Caliphate', which would include Iraq and Syria, and in theory covers the global Muslim population. They called upon Muslims all over the world to pledge allegiance to their Caliph, Ibrahim Abu Bakr al-Baghdadi. ISIL claimed to have a plan to take over the city of Arar in Saudi Arabia, which is very close to the Iraqi border.

In July NBC news reported that disagreements had erupted between ISIL and two large Sunni insurgent groups in Iraq, the Army of the Men of the Naqshbandi Order and 1920 Revolution Brigade, leading to skirmishes between the allies on July. NBC quoted an unnamed senior U.S. counterterrorism official claiming that "the tribal groups do not necessarily follow strict Islamic law the way ISIS does, which naturally leads to conflict".

=== Kurdish referendum for independence ===
Borders of the Kurdistan Region (disputed): Kurdistan Region; Unrecognised incorporated territory; Other claimed and controlled territory; Other claimed territory; Rest of Iraq

Masoud Barzani, the leader of the Kurdistan Region expressed on 3 July his will to organize a referendum to push forward the area's independence from Iraq. The Kurdish forces indeed controlled an important area in northern Iraq, outside of ISIL's control, free from the Iraqi government's influence as a result of the ISIL offensive. Israel's prime minister Benyamin Netanyahu declared in June 2014 that his government would support an independent Kurdistan.

=== Massacre of minorities ===
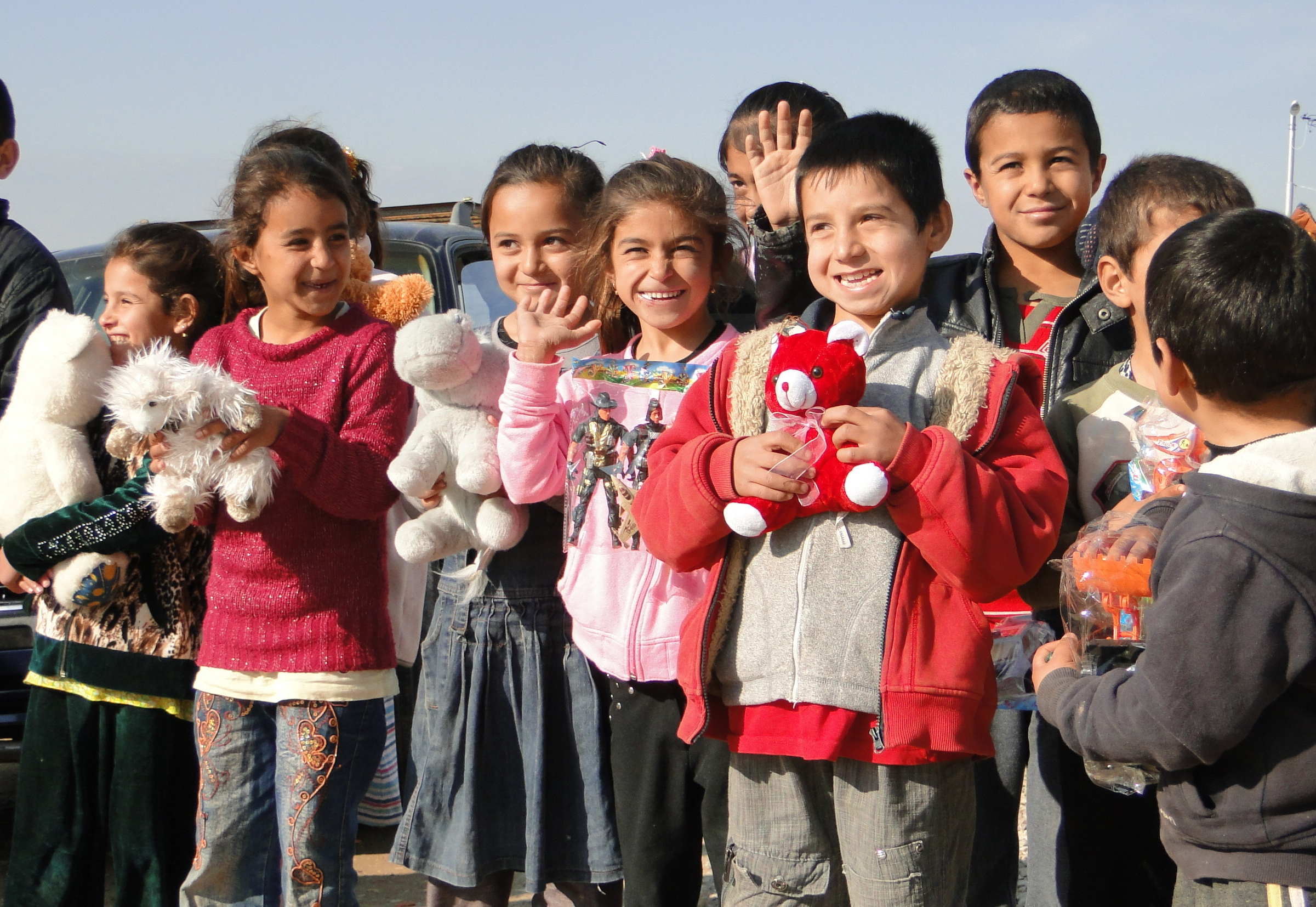
Defend International provided humanitarian aid to Yazidi refugees in Iraqi Kurdistan in December 2014.

Thousands of Assyrians, Yazidis, Kurds and other ethnic minorities were reportedly massacred by ISIL fighters. After the capture of Qaraqosh, the Iraqi city with the largest Assyrian population, on 7 August, thousands fled their homes from the Qaraqosh and Mosul as they were given an ultimatum by the insurgents. Assyrians, Yazidis, Kurds and other minorities were massacred by being buried alive, burnt alive, or shot. Women from these groups were raped and killed, or married to ISIL fighters. Many Kurds became frightened that ISIL would perpetrate another massacre similar to the Anfal Genocide.

"Qaraqosh, Tal Kayf, Bartella and Karamlesh have been emptied of their original population and are now under the control of militants", Joseph Thomas, the Arch Bishop of the Iraqi cities of Kirkuk and Sulaimaniyah, told AFP. Prior to the offensive, Qaraqosh had an estimated Christian population of about 50,000.

Chaldean Patriarch Louis Sako said the ISIL advance into Iraq created a 'humanitarian disaster' and that more than 100,000 Christians were forced to leave their homes. "The churches are occupied and crosses taken down", and more than 1,500 documents had been destroyed, he said.

Around Sinjar, the Peshmerga withdrew from the area without effectively communicating this development to the Yazidi inhabitants, prompting the locals to flee to the Kurdistan Region after brief clashes with ISIL. NGOs have also accused the Peshmerga of confiscating weapons from the Yazidis.

== Reactions ==
=== Domestic ===
Despite the security crisis, Iraq's Parliament was not convened and did not allow Maliki to declare a state of emergency; many Sunni and Kurdish legislators boycotted the session because they opposed expanding the prime minister's powers.

Most Iraqis view the conflict as a partial Sunni uprising, rather than as a simple lunge for power by ISIL.

==== Shia ====
On 13 June 2014, the highest religious authority for the Shia in Iraq, Grand Ayatollah Ali Sistani, asked people to fight the Islamic State. According to one of his representatives, Sheikh Abdulmehdi al-Karbalai, he asked for "people who are capable of carrying arms and fighting the terrorists in defense of their country... (to) volunteer to join the security forces to achieve this sacred goal".

In late June, powerful Shiite cleric Muqtada al-Sadr vowed to "shake the ground" under the feet of the militants, days after fighters loyal to him paraded with weapons in the Sadr City area of north Baghdad, vowing to fight the militant offensive.

==== Sunni ====
Fugitive Iraq Vice President Tariq al-Hashimi, a Sunni who described the fall of Mosul as a "Revolution of the oppressed, downtrodden and marginalized people in Mosul", denied ISIL played a leading role amongst the government's opponents and alleged the militancy against the central government was led by Sunni tribes and disenfranchised Sunnis.

Another prominent Sunni, Ali Hatem al-Suleiman (emir of the large Dulaim tribe), claimed "It is the tribal rebels who are in control of the situation in Mosul. It is not reasonable to say that a group like ISIL, which has a small number of men and vehicles, could be in control of a large city like Mosul. Therefore, it is clear that this is a tribal revolution, but the government is trying to force us all to wear the robe of the terrorists and ISIS."

A member of insurgent held Mosul's governing council, a former colonel in the Ba'ath era military alleged that the opposition to the government was composed of multiple Sunni Arab factions, most of which are led by officers from the disbanded military. The former officer claimed that the various opposition factions were working to minimize ISIL influence and appoint officials capable of restoring services in insurgent held areas.

==== Kurdish ====
Kurdish parliamentarian Shoresh Haji stated "I hope that the Kurdish leadership will not miss this golden opportunity to bring Kurdish lands in the disputed territories back under Kurdish control".

=== International reactions ===
International bodies

- Arab League – On 12 June, Arab League Secretary-General, Nabil al-Arabi condemned what he described as the "criminal activities" committed by ISIL group in Mosul. He emphasized on the necessity of "national consensus in Iraq at this critical time, which threatens Iraq's security and political stability."
- United Nations – On 10 June, the United Nations' Secretary-General, Ban Ki-moon, asked all political leaders in Iraq to show national unity against the ISIL offensive, expressed grave concern about the "serious deterioration", and condemned the recent attacks that have left scores dead and wounded in Iraq's northern and eastern provinces. He recalled that all UN Member States have an obligation to implement and enforce the targeted financial sanctions, arms embargo and travel ban imposed on ISIL under the sanctions regime pursuant to Security Council Resolution 1267 (1999) and Security Council Resolution 1989 (2011). It also evacuated its 60 staff members from Baghdad to neighboring Jordan. After ISIL released graphic photographs of its fighters shooting scores of young men, the United Nations said on 16 June, cold blooded "executions" said to have been carried out by militants in northern Iraq almost certainly amount to war crimes.

U.N. member states

- India – On 16 June, Indian External Affairs Ministry condemned the takeover of Iraqi cities like Mosul and Tikrit by ISIL and reiterated its support to the government and the people of Iraq in their fight against international terrorism. It also set up a 24-hour helpline at Indian embassy in Baghdad for assistance of Indian nationals stranded in these cities. It has been reported that 46 Indian nurses were abducted from the Iraqi town of Mosul who were later freed and flown back to India.
- Iran – On 12 June, the Iranian president, Hasan Rouhani, stated: "For our part, as the government of the Islamic Republic of Iran ... we will combat violence, extremism and terrorism in the region and the world." On 11 June, the Foreign Minister of Iran, Mohammad Javad Zarif, had condemned the "murder of Iraqi citizens" as he offered Iraq's government support against terrorism. However, Iranian officials have not explained how Iran will help Iraq's government. Iran dispatched Revolutionary Guard forces to help Iraq's government recapture Tikrit. Iran sent three battalions of the special operations Quds Force and has sent a total of 2000 men between 12 and 14 June. According to Washington Post, any support from Iran will be subtler, confined to military planning and strategy rather than manpower.
- Russia - Russian President Vladimir Putin has expressed "full support" to the Iraqi government. Eight days later, Deputy Foreign Minister Sergei Ryabkov announced that "Russia will not stand idle toward attempts by terrorist groups to spread terrorism in regional states" and urged Europe and the United States to take action against ISIL. On 29 June, Russia delivered Sukhoi Su-25 ground attack aircraft to the Iraqi Air Force, days after a request by the Iraqi government. Unconfirmed reports suggest that six Sukhoi Su-30 multirole aircraft are to be delivered as well. Photos have appears on Iraqi social media depicting Russian-made rocket artillery TOS-1 arriving in Baghdad.
- Syria – On 11 June, Syrian Ministry of Foreign Affairs and Expatriates condemned recent acts of militants from the Islamic State in Iraq and the Levant on the territory of Iraq. It also expressed support and solidarity to the Iraqi government in its fight against the armed terrorist groups in Iraq. On 15 June, the Syrian Air Force was carrying out airstrikes on ISIL bases in coordination with Iraq. Airstrikes were carried out against ISIL bases in Raqqa and Al-Hasakah inside Syria, and headquarters in Shaddadi, a town close to the border with Iraq.
- Saudi Arabia – The Saudi Arabia government said that the tensions there were due to sectarian policies which threatened its stability and sovereignty, according to the official Saudi Press Agency. It warned against foreign intervention and urged Iraqis to form a national unity government.
- Turkey – ISIL captured Ankara's consul general in Mosul and detained 49 Turkish citizens including the Consul-General, Öztürk Yılmaz. It also took hostage 31 Turkish truck drivers. Some reports suggest that the hostages have been moved to the residence of the ISIL-sponsored Mosul governor, in possible preparation for their release. Turkey has called an emergency NATO meeting.

The hostages were freed in mid September 2014. Turkey denied paying ransom but prisoner swaps were hinted at. It was later revealed that Turkish authorities had initially paid a certain amount of money to ISIL officials and the hostages were later swapped for 180 militants who had been apprehended or undergoing medical treatment in Turkey.

- United Kingdom – On 17 June, Prime Minister David Cameron said the UK would be reopening the British Embassy in Iran in an effort to rebuild the nations' diplomatic relationship to help combat the recent event in Iraq. On 18 June, PM Cameron said that he believed ISIL was planning a terror attack on the UK.
- United States – On 12 June, U.S. President Barack Obama said he was exploring all options to save Iraq's security forces from collapse, and U.S. companies evacuated hundreds from a major air base. "Our national security team is looking at all the options... I don't rule out anything," he declared. U.S. Senator Lindsey Graham warned an ISIL takeover in both Iraq and Syria would create a "hell on earth" and called for the urgent deployment of U.S. air power to "change the battlefield equation".

On 13 June, Obama said the United States "will not be sending U.S. troops back into combat in Iraq," but that he would be reviewing a range of other options in coming days. He called on Iraq's neighbors to help out, too, and told the only guarantee of success involved political reforms by al-Maliki that promoted cooperation with Sunnis.
On 15 June, US government announced that it was drawing down staff at its embassy in Baghdad. Referring to the "ongoing instability and violence in certain areas," a State Department statement said the embassy will also increase the number of security personnel deployed at the heavily guarded mission. A separate Pentagon statement said "a small number" of Defense Department personnel were being sent to augment security at the facility.
On 16 June, President Obama notified Congress that a total of 275 U.S. soldiers and Marines could be deployed to Iraq to provide security for the U.S. Embassy in Baghdad and other U.S. personnel in Iraq. About 160 troops were already in the country and 100 will be stationed as reserve forces in a nearby country to be deployed if needed. The special forces team would operate under the U.S. ambassador in Baghdad and would be barred from engaging in ground combat.
The Guardian reported on 18 June that Dianne Feinstein, the chair of the Senate Intelligence Committee, and John McCain thought Maliki's government should step down. White House spokesman Jay Carney said, "we will aggressively attempt to impress upon that leader the absolute necessity of rejecting sectarian governance". The Secretary of State, John Kerry, stated that Washington was not focused Maliki, but on the Iraqi people. A spokesman for the Nouri al-Malik said he will not stand down.
As of 19 June, reports emerged suggesting that if the United States carries out airstrikes over Iraq, as requested by the Iraqi government, that Obama may act without congressional approval. Also on 19 June, Barack Obama announced he is sending up to 300 military advisers to Iraq, and could down the road authorize targeted military action, if necessary. According to CNN, one aircraft carrier and five warships are already positioned in the Persian Gulf, U.S. drones are flying intelligence missions over Iraq and a list of ISIL targets has been compiled.
On 23 June, John Kerry met with Nouri al-Malik, Iraq's Foreign Minister Hoshyar Zibari, and Sunni and Shia leaders in Baghdad. The purpose was to affirm the US commitment to Iraq during the crisis and to discuss the formation of a new government. These meetings occur as ISIL proceeded to capture more territory north and west of the capital. Kerry also rejected al-Maliki's request for prompt American airstrikes on the militants' positions in Iraq and Syria, saying that care must be taken before such attacks are launched to avoid giving the impression that the Americans are targeting Sunnis.
On 8 August 2014, President Obama authorized airstrikes and humanitarian aid to civilians trapped in the mountains, who didn't have access to food or water. He said the move for airstrikes was to stop the advancement of the IS convoys into Erbil. He strongly asserted that the minorities, including the Christians and the Yazidis must be protected from the 'genocide'.

=== Others ===
On 14 June, Shaykh Yusuf al-Qaradawi, chairman of the International Union of Muslim Scholars, described the event as a "national revolution" He said the insurgency "could not have been led by one Islamist party," a reference to ISIL, instead describing it as an "all-out Sunni revolution" (or "Overwhelming revolution for Sunnah") and warned against sectarian war. Calling for the formation of a "national unity government", he said that "this is not a revolution against the Shias".

According to the Jerusalem Center for Public Affairs, "The Kurds, seeing the Iraqi central regime's weakness, will take all the necessary measures to protect their autonomy and expand their influence to neighboring Syrian Kurdistan. The Kurds understand very well that they could be the next target after the Assyrians and accordingly will preempt any attempt by the jihadists to set foot in their areas. The fall of Mosul could become the beginning of Kurdish quest for independence."

Tirana Hassan, of the Human Rights Watch, reports that Khorasani Brigade, a Shia militia, has ethnically cleansed the village of Yengija, 50 miles south of Kirkuk. The Sunni population was driven from the village and their homes were razed.

== See also ==
- 2012–14 Iraqi protests
- 2014 Eastern Syria offensive
- Spillover of the Syrian Civil War
