= Dale Stoffel =

American businessman and arms dealer (1961–2004)

Dale C. Stoffel
- Born: November 18, 1961; United States
- Died: December 8, 2004 (age 43); Taji, Iraq
- Education: Washington & Jefferson College
- Occupations: Businessman and Arms Dealer
- Spouse: Barbara

Dale C. Stoffel (November 18, 1961 – December 8, 2004) was an American businessman and arms dealer who was involved with the American reconstruction efforts following the Iraq War. After alerting the Pentagon to corruption and payment irregularities involving U.S. personnel in the Coalition Provisional Authority and with the Iraqi government, he was killed in an ambush in Taji, Iraq.

== Early career ==
In 1985, Stoffel was recruited by the Office of Naval Intelligence (ONI) to work on missile technology. In his first year at ONI, his coworker, Jonathan Pollard was arrested for espionage. Stoffel openly despised dishonesty and repeated for years that Pollard was a money grubber who used spying for Israel as a way out. In 1987, he was part of the ONI team that proved that the USS Stark was hit by two missiles, which made it difficult for the Iraqis to claim a single accidentally fired missile was responsible.

During the 1990s, he worked on a top-secret program for the United States military, procuring Russian, Chinese, and other foreign-made weaponry for testing. In this job, he used Eastern European contacts, especially in Ukraine and Bulgaria, allowing him to purchase surface-to-air missiles and antiaircraft systems.

He later became a businessman and arms dealer. His lifestyle mirrored that of a soldier of fortune and he was known to routinely carry an automatic weapon slung across his shoulder with a cigar in his mouth.

Among his duties, he was executive vice president of international development for Canonsburg-based CLI Corp.

== Iraq operations ==
=== Defense contracts ===
He had a close relationship with a number of Washington lobbyists connected to Ahmed Chalabi.

After the Iraq War, Stoffel's company, Wye Oak Technology, received one of the first contracts issued by the new Iraqi Ministry of Defense to refurbish the country's Soviet-era T-55 tanks and artillery. After General David Petraeus sent a July 20, 2004 letter to Iraqi Minister of Defense, Hazim al-Shaalan, pledging full support for Stoffel, the contract to Wye Oak was awarded and signed on August 16, 2004. The contract was jointly administered by Wye Oak and another Stoffel-related company, CLI, Inc.

The first shipment of tanks arrived in Iraq in November and were used to supply Iraq's 1st Mechanized Brigade. It is reported that Stoffel understood the risks involved with his job, but hoped that by aiding the Iraqi military, he could help U.S. troops return home sooner.

All told, his contracts with the Iraqi government were worth more than US$40 million.

=== Corruption whistleblowing ===
He was an arms dealer with a mysterious past, a swashbuckling, larger-than-life character who'd been around the block of international intrigue more than once. But in all the chaos, in a place overrun with mercenaries, privateers, and shady officials, he nonetheless expected everyone in Iraq to play by his rules.

— Associated Press

On May 20, 2004, Stoffel was granted limited immunity from prosecution by the Special Inspector General for Iraq Reconstruction (SIGIR) in a whistleblower complaint. He gave investigators information regarding U.S. corruption in the Iraqi reconstruction effort that implicated Colonel Anthony B. Bell, and SIGIR opened an investigation of him among others. Col. Bell was later implicated in the bribery case of Maj. John Cockerham. In his statement, Stoffel described thousands of dollars in payments being delivered to American contracting offices in pizza boxes, pizza delivery-style, and dead drop payoffs in paper sacks dropped off throughout the Green Zone.

=== Complaints about payments ===
Immediately after delivering the first batch of tanks in November 2004, Stoffel alerted the Pentagon to irregularities regarding the way his company was being compensated. In a November 30, 2004 e-mail to a senior assistant of Petraeus, Stoffel stated, "If we proceed down the road we are currently on, there will be serious legal issues that will land us all in jail". The Iraqi Ministry of Defence's method of payment gave rise to his suspicions that Iraqi officials were receiving kickbacks. The Ministry was routing payments through Raymond Zayna, a French-Lebanese businessman with a company called General Investment Group, who claimed to be acting as an escrow agent under power of attorney, but later claimed to be a partner of Wye Oak. Stoffel also alleged that the Ministry was forcing him to use preferred sub-contractors. By November, Stoffel was owed $24.7 million from the Ministry. His case was part of a larger trend involving middlemen and kickbacks in the Iraqi government and the rebuilding process.

Stoffel returned to the United States in November 2004. He met with Pennsylvania senator Rick Santorum, who wrote to Secretary Donald Rumsfeld on December 3, 2004, on Stoffel's behalf, urging the Pentagon to address the issue of payment to Wye Oak Technology with the Iraqi Minister of Defense, Hazim al-Shaalan. With an introduction made by Republican insider Pat Templeton, Stoffel met with Deputy Undersecretary of Defense John A. "Jack" Shaw to discuss payment to his company and his concerns of corruption in both the U.S. and Iraqi procurement efforts. Shaw's office forwarded the complaint to the Department of the Army. This would prove useless as Shaw, himself under investigation by the FBI for corruption related to Iraq reconstruction contracts, was fired on December 10, 2004 - two days after Stoffel's death.

Stoffel returned to Iraq on December 5, 2004. A short time later, he and his business partner Joseph Wemple attended a meeting chaired by British Brig. Gen. David Clements, who was deputy commander of the mission to train Iraqi troops, at the Iraqi Ministry of Defence. Present at the Meeting were Ziyad Cattan of the Iraqi MOD and Raymond Zayna, the Lebanese businessman. After some discussion, Clements told the Iraqi MOD to provide Zayna with the authorization necessary to release the money. Zayna agreed to make an immediate payment of $4.7 million to Stoffel on the condition that Stoffel provides detailed invoices. Friends and colleagues report that Stoffel considered the problem solved at that time.

=== Assassination ===
On December 8, Stoffel met with Clements at Taji, the Iraqi base north of Baghdad where the refurbishment of the armor was carried out. After the meeting, the vehicle carrying Stoffel, Wemple, and an interpreter was attacked. As the car was leaving Taji for Baghdad, a car rammed theirs head-on. Two masked men jumped out and killed Wemple and Stoffel in a hail of bullets; the interpreter was not killed and went missing. Stoffel had been shot several times in the head and back, while Wemple was shot once through the head. A previously unknown group, Brigades of the Islamic Jihad claimed responsibility through an online video. However, security experts doubted the claim and questioned whether the video was simply a ruse. The video described Stoffel as "CIA shadow director" and "close friend of George Bush".

=== Aftermath and investigations ===
His death raised questions about the integrity of the Iraqi reconstruction effort, which had been hampered by corruption. The Sunday Times said that Stoffel's death "appeared all too predictable. He was an adventurer who seemed to have met his end at the hands of jihadists while engaged in one of the riskiest businesses on the planet. "

Following the attacks, CLI, Inc. left Iraq. After Stoffel's death, senior U.S. military officials continued to work with Zayna, who was reported to take over Wye Oak's contract.

In January 2005, Petraeus declined to discuss the matter and a spokesman for Petraeus' task force stated that the issue was an "MOD [Iraqi Ministry of Defence] matter. There really isn't much ... to our involvement." After being told about e-mails demonstrating that Petraeus' task force was directing the work on the contract, the spokesman said, "performance under this contract was of interest" to U.S. officials.

According to officials investigating his death, there is no evidence that the attack was related to his allegations of corruption. The murders remain unsolved. Stoffel's brother, who also worked for Wye Oak, received several death threats, warning him to stay away from Iraq.

In 2009, an investigation into high-level officials, at least partially spawned by Stoffel's 2004 allegations, was opened. The investigation, including the Special Inspector General for Iraq Reconstruction, the Justice Department, the Army's Criminal Investigation Command, and other federal agencies investigated numerous instances of graft and bribery among the Iraqi reconstruction effort.

=== Unpaid invoices claim ===
On July 20, 2009, his wife, Barbara sued the Iraqi government for unpaid invoices of around $25 million. Wye Oak, owned by the estate of Dale Stoffel, was the plaintiff versus the defendant, named as the "Republic of Iraq", in the U.S. District Court for the Eastern District of Virginia. On April 23, 2013, the U.S. District Court, District of Columbia denied Iraq's motion to have the case dismissed on jurisdictional grounds. Iraq argued that the claim should have named the Iraqi Ministry of Defence, as a separate legal entity, but the D.C. District Court confirmed that under US law, i.e. the Foreign Sovereign Immunities Act of 2016, "a foreign state and its armed forces are not legally separate for jurisdictional purposes".
