= Battle of Kuwait International Airport =

Tank battle during the First Gulf War

- Part of the Persian Gulf War
- The "heel" of Kuwait
Date	February 27, 1991
Location	Kuwait City Airport 29°14′15″N 47°58′26″E
Result	American victory

Belligerents
United States	Iraq

Commanders and leaders
(United States) Maj. Gen. Myatt (United States) Colonel Fulford Jr	(Ba'athist Iraq) Maj. Gen. Mahmoud (Ba'athist Iraq) Gen. Hamdani

Units involved
1st Marine Division; 2nd Marine Division; Bravo Company, 4th Tank Battalion, 4th Marine Division; 2nd Armored Division's Tiger Brigade; 3-41 Infantry's Straight and Stalwart Battalion Task Force; United States Army Special Forces	3rd Armored Division; 5th Mechanized Division; 1st Mechanized Division; 6th Armored Division; 7th Infantry Division; 8th Infantry Division; 11th Infantry Division; 14th Infantry Division; 29th Infantry Division; 15th Infantry Division; 18th Infantry Division; 19th Infantry Division; 36th Infantry Division; 42nd Infantry Division; 449th Field Artillery Brigade; Multiple Commando Units

Casualties and losses
19 killed 48 wounded 1 M1A1 tank damaged 10 M60A1 tanks destroyed/damaged	Heavy casualties Thousands captured Hundreds of Iraqi tanks and armored personnel carriers destroyed or captured
- 1 British Airways Boeing 747-100 destroyed

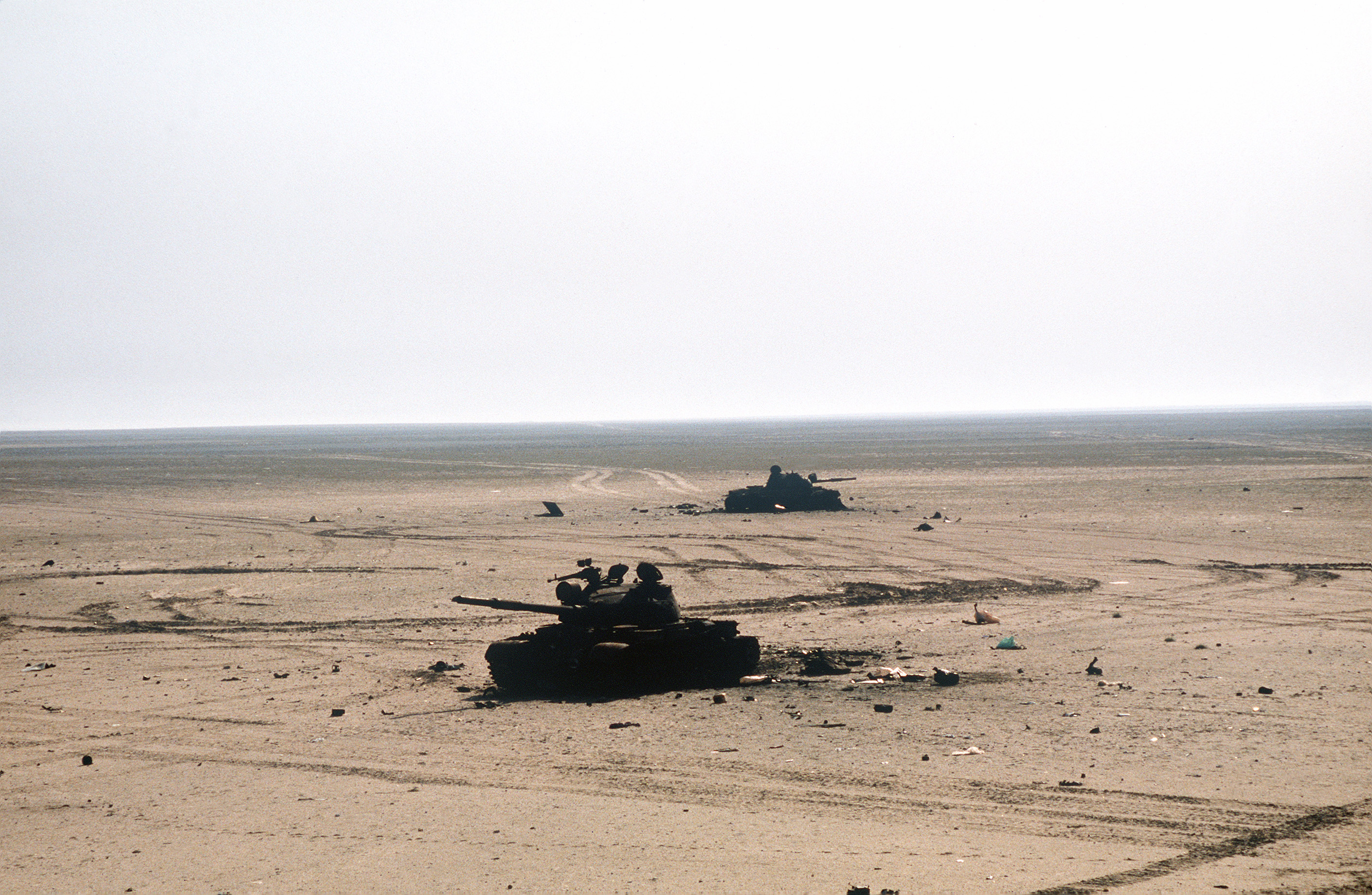
Two destroyed Iraqi T-62 tanks on the battlefield, February 1991.

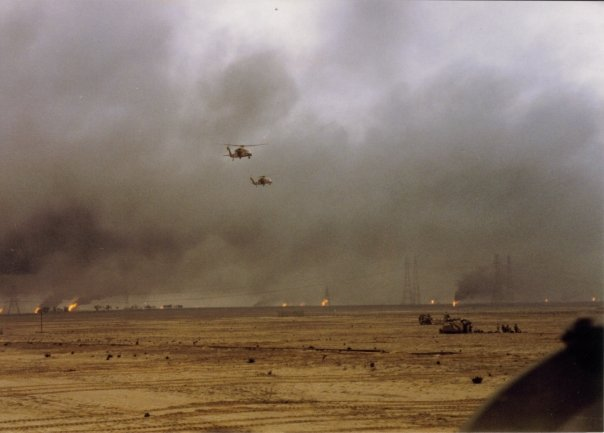
The battlefield at Burgan Oil Field where the United States Marine Corps destroyed 60 Iraqi tanks during the 1st Gulf War, February 1991.

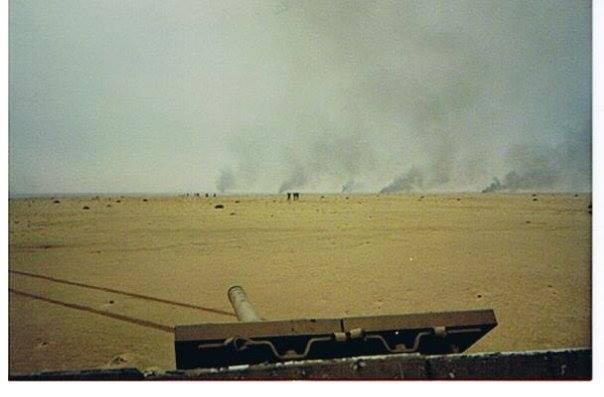
A United States Marine Corps tank bears witness to burning Iraqi tanks and Iraqi soldiers leaving their fighting positions at a battle that took place at Burgan Oil Field during the 1st Gulf War, February 1991.

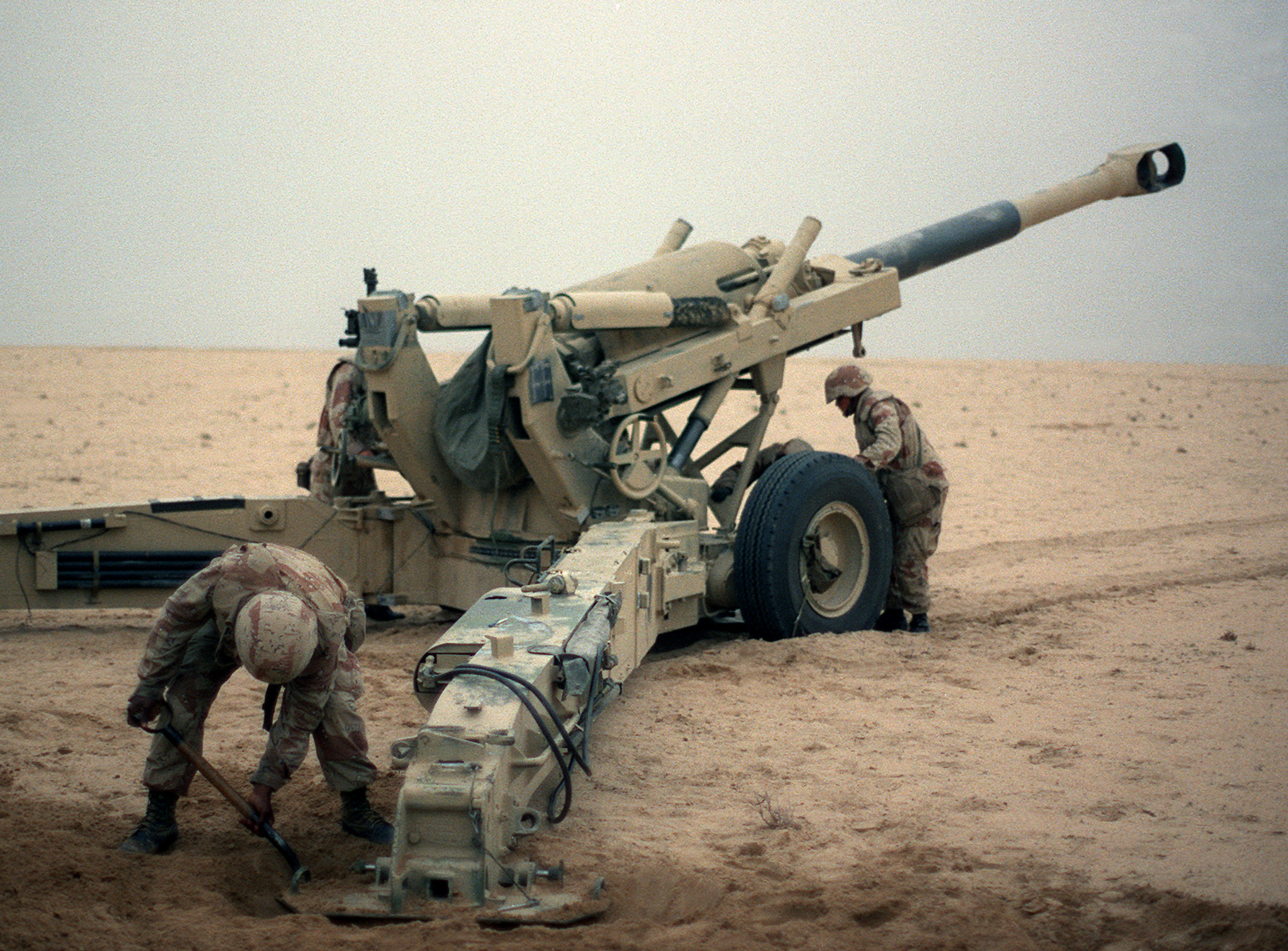
Marine Artillery played a huge factor in disrupting Iraqi counterattacks during the 1st Gulf War, February 1991.

The Battle of Kuwait International Airport occurred on February 27, 1991, during the 1st Gulf War. It was a tank battle between the United States (as part of the Coalition of the Gulf War) and Iraq. Despite being a very large battle it is often overlooked compared to the other battles which took place during the war. No less than elements of 18 divisions total participated in this battle. US Army Special Forces units and multiple Iraqi Commando units were also in theatre. In reality the battle took place over a span of three days despite the primary battle at Kuwait International Airport lasting only one day. Much of the combat actually took place en route to the airport. The battle featured the "Reveille Engagement" which went on to become the biggest and fastest tank battle in United States Marine Corps' entire history.

== Participants ==
Both the United States Marine Corps' 1st Marine Division and 2nd Marine Division participated in this battle. The 2nd Marine Division was assisted by the U.S. Army's 2nd Armored Division's Tiger Brigade which was spearheaded by the 3-41 Infantry's Straight and Stalwart Battalion Task Force, with Field Artillery support from 1-3 field artillery battalion. U.S. Army Special Forces also conducted operations during this battle primarily inside the Kuwait International Airport to clear the complex of enemy snipers and any other resistance that remained. Iraq was represented by 14 divisions and a field artillery brigade. Iraq also had multiple Commando units in this theatre of operations.

== 1st Marine Division ==
Task Force Ripper under Colonel Carlton W. Fulford Jr led the 1st Marine Division straight into Kuwait City. Smashing through enemy armor and enemy delaying actions. As the Marine 1st Division edged nearer to the city, commanders heard reports of two developing counterattacks by Iraqi forces. "We fired on the two gathering points and it wasn't 30 minutes before we scattered them like rabbits out of the bush," said Myatt, the division commander. "The Cobras (helicopter gunships) and the LAVs (light armored vehicles) had a field day" as a "hunter-killer package" to search out and destroy Iraqi equipment. On the way to their objective, the Kuwait International Airport, Task Force Ripper M60A1 Patton tanks destroyed about 100 Iraqi tanks and armored personnel carriers. 1st Marine division commander Maj. Gen. J.M. Myatt said, "During the first day of combat operations 1st Platoon, D Company, 3rd Tank Battalion destroyed 15 Iraqi tanks". The Marines also destroyed 25 APCs and took 300 POWs. The 1st Marine Division's Task Force Shepherd lost 14 killed in action during combat operations en route to Kuwait International Airport. Task Force Taro was also a participant in the 1st Marine Division's combat operations. Task Force Papa Bear, C and D Co, 1st Marine Division, who as the division reserve repelled a huge enemy counter-attack while defending the minefield breach. The 1st Marine Division also destroyed around 60 Iraqi tanks near the Burgan oil field without suffering any losses.

An Iraqi counterattack was broken up by fire from 5 Marine artillery battalions. An assault by the 22nd Brigade of the Iraqi 5th Mechanized Division was broken at the point of attack by Marine Infantry. Company I of the 3rd Battalion, 9th Marines hit the Iraqi 22nd Brigade with close range fire from their Dragon ATGMs and handheld antitank weapons. Company C, 1st Tank Battalion would destroy 18 Iraqi vehicles during this particular engagement. The 1st Marine Division lost 1 M60A1 tank clearing a path through a minefield. The 1st Marine Division encountered more Iraqi opposition as it proceeded to move north. Elements of the 1st Marine Division came into contact with the Iraqi 15th Mechanized Brigade, 3rd Armored Division. During this engagement the Marines destroyed an additional 46 enemy vehicles and took approximately 929 POWs. Three Marines were wounded in the process. As the 1st Marine Division continued its advance it destroyed an additional 29 Iraqi combat vehicles and captured 320 POWs. During these engagements the most effective Iraqi unit appeared to be the Iraqi 449th Artillery Brigade. Its accurate fire killed a Marine and wounded 12 others. Marine Company C, 3rd Tank Battalion would have a tank damaged by Iraqi artillery fire. In return 1st Marine Division artillery would also prove its worth eliminating numerous enemy targets or driving off other Iraqi forces. The 1st Marine Division would encounter more Iraqi opposition along the way to the Kuwait International Airport destroying dozens of more Iraqi tanks and APCs while taking hundreds of additional POWs. Once the 1st Marine Division reached Kuwait International Airport they found what remained of the Iraqi 12th Armored Brigade, 3rd Armored Division defending it. The Marines also encountered T-62 tanks in dispersed and understrength platoon and company units. They were knocked out by BGM-71 TOWs at long range. By the end of the day the Iraqi 3rd Armored Division was totally destroyed. The Iraqi 3rd Armored Division losses included more than 250 T-55/62s and 70 T-72 tanks.

== 2nd Marine Division ==
The 2nd Marine Division entered from the other side of the city. Marine Reserve unit Bravo Company, 4th Tank Battalion, 4th Marine Division was assigned to the 2nd Marine Division. On February 25, 1991, Day 2 of the Desert Storm ground war, Bravo Company 4th Tank Battalion was in a coil formation and awakened from a 25% watch to find 35 Iraqi Republican Guard tanks angling across their front, not realizing at the time that they were outnumbered 3–1. With their 13 M1A1 Abrams tanks, Bravo Company 4th Tank Battalion moved online to take out the 35 Iraqi Republican Guard tanks in less than 90 seconds. This battle was named the "Reveille Engagement" and went on to be the biggest and fastest tank battle in United States Marine Corps history. They were the only Marine unit equipped with M1A1 Abrams tanks. Bravo company went on to destroy 59 tanks, 32 APCs, 26 non armored vehicles, and an artillery gun. Bravo Company destroyed a total of 119 enemy vehicles and took over 800 POWs. Tank crew "Stepchild" has the longest confirmed live kill (Iraqi BMP) by a tank at 3,750 meters (2.33 mi). Yet, many Marine tank battles were conducted at short range due to poor visual conditions on the battlefield.

The Marines were assisted by the U.S. Army 2nd Armored Division's Tiger Brigade which was spearheaded by the 3-41 Infantry's Straight and Stalwart Battalion Task Force. The 2nd Armored Division's 3-41 Straight and Stalwart Battalion Task Force and the 1-3 Field Artillery Bn destroyed a large number of enemy vehicles and captured over 1,000 prisoners during combat operations. The 1st Tiger Brigade claims 181 destroyed or captured enemy tanks, 148 APCs, 40 artillery pieces, 27 AA emplacements, 263 Iraqi dead and 4,051 captured after 100 hours of combat. The 2nd Marine Division lost 9 M60A1 tanks breaching the minefield. One M1A1 tank, belonging to the 2nd Armored Division's Tiger Brigade, was also damaged by a landmine. A pre planned counterattack by the 8th Mechanized Brigade of the Iraqi 3rd Armored Division attacked M1A1 tanks in the 2nd Marine Division's sector and was destroyed without loss, while the Marine 8th Tank Battalion destroyed other Iraqi tanks. The Marine 3rd Tank Battalion destroyed an unknown number of Iraqi T-62 tanks around Al Jaber Airfield. On the second day of the U.S. advance a platoon from the Marine 8th Battalion destroyed 13 Iraqi tanks in a battle near a defensive position known as the Ice Tray. Marine and Navy air power then inflicted heavy casualties on retreating Iraqi forces leading north out of Kuwait City. Later that night, some of the battles intensified as Marine forces surrounded the heavily defended Kuwait International Airport. U.S. Navy battleships offshore in the Persian Gulf pounded the airport hangars, terminals and other buildings, leaving them a shambles of twisted metal and blackened concrete in an effort to rout Iraqi forces from the field. Marine commanders said that cameras in remotely piloted aircraft that monitored the bombings showed Iraqis "literally jumping out of the tanks." After the Marines commandeered the critical airfield, Special Forces teams arrived to counter snipers and other pockets of resistance that remained entrenched around the large airport complex. While Marine and Special Forces personnel were actively securing the airfield, Air Force communications personnel arrived and setup tactical air traffic control and landing systems to replace systems damaged by retreating Iraqi forces. Marines from Marine Air Traffic Squadron 38 established Approach ATC services and maintained service until civilian ATC returned. The Marines lost 5 killed and 48 wounded in the three days of fighting, Marine officials said. Marine M60A1 tankers had tallied impressive totals against the Iraqi armored forces. The 1st Tank Battalion claimed 50 Iraqi T-55 and T-62 tanks and 25 APCs. The 3rd Battalion claimed 57 T-55s and T-62s (plus 5 T-72s), 7 APCs, and 10 trucks. The 8th Battalion destroyed more than three dozen tanks and a number of other vehicles.

== Additional combat operations ==
On the third and final day of combat the 2nd Marine Division would liberate the city of Al Jahra then would go on to occupy the high ground on the Mutla Ridge cutting off the Iraqi escape route from Kuwait to Basra. M1A1 tanks would destroy the majority of the 166 Iraqi tanks that were claimed that day by the division. Iraqi General Ra'ad Hamdani commented on the armored engagement: "We had a problem of inflexibility of usage with the armored forces. We always favored tying the infantry to tank divisions."

== Sources ==
- Col H. Avery Chenoweth (2005) Semper Fi: The Definitive Illustrated History of the U.S. Marines
- 2nd Armored Division "Hell on Wheels" by Steven Smith
- Blitzkrieg in the Gulf: Armor of the 100 Hour war by Yves Debay
- U.S. Marines in the Persian Gulf, 1990-1991 With the 1st U.S. Marine Division in Desert Shield and Desert Storm by Lieutenant Colonel Charles H. Cureton
- M60 vs T-62 Cold War Combatants 1956-92 by Lon Nordeen & David Isby
- The Marine Air Command and Control System, A Historical Perspective. Lt Col Richard Martin, JR LtCol USMC Air War College. April 1994 (https://apps.dtic.mil/dtic/tr/fulltext/u2/a280812.pdf)
