= 11th Division (Iraq) =

- Active: 1959–present
- Country: Iraq (1959–present)
- Allegiance: Iraq
- Branch: Iraqi Army
- Type: Motorized infantry
- Size: Division
- Part of: Iraqi Ground Forces Command
- Engagements: Iran–Iraq War; Gulf War; Iraq War; International military intervention against ISIL

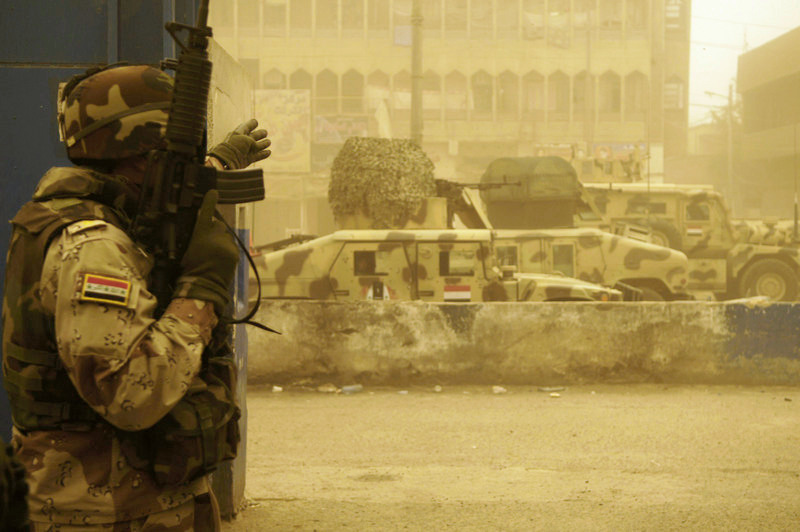
A unit of the 42nd Brigade confronts "illegal" elements of the Mahdi Army in Sadr City on 17 April 2008

The 11th Infantry Division is a formation (military) of the Iraqi Army.

During the Iraqi occupation of Kuwait in 1990–91, the 11th Infantry Division occupied Kuwait City. It participated in the Battle of Kuwait International Airport.

== History ==
In 2002 the division was made up of the 23rd, 45th and 47th Infantry Brigades. As the 2003 U.S. invasion of Iraq began, three brigade-sized elements of the division were guarding the An Nasiriyah area as part of the 3rd Corps.

After reformation circa 2006–2007, its headquarters was located in the former Ministry of Defence building in Baghdad.

Division units:

- 42nd Infantry Brigade ('Tigers') - Adhamiyah (NE Baghdad) (former 2nd Brigade, 6th Division)
- 43rd Infantry Brigade - Western Baghdad
- 44th Infantry Brigade - Sadr City
- 45th Infantry Brigade - Eastern Baghdad (planned to be operational in 2008)

The 11th Division was put in place at the end of 2007 as part of the Iraq War troop surge of 2007 and the Baghdad Security Plan. It was formed from an experienced brigade, the 2nd Brigade, 6th Division (which became its 1st Brigade) and received the help of the 4th Brigade of the 1st Division (which is still operating in Baghdad au côté de la 11th Division), to which were added two newly formed brigades and one still forming at the time. It played a significant role in the Siege of Sadr City from April 2008. The division's area of responsibility is the east of Baghdad. Its soldier numbers are low, compared to a standard infantry division.
