= Battle of Khafji =

1991 ground engagement of the Gulf War

- Part of the Gulf War
- Map of military operations during the liberation of Khafji
Date	29 January – 1 February 1991 (3 days)
Location	Khafji, Eastern Province, Saudi Arabia; 28.425°N 48.500°E
Result	Coalition victory

Belligerents
(United Nations) Coalition; United States; Saudi Arabia; Qatar; Kuwait	Iraq

Commanders and leaders
(Saudi Arabia) Khalid bin Sultan; (Saudi Arabia) Turki Abdulmohsin al-Firmi; (Saudi Arabia) Sultan Adi al-Mutairi; (Saudi Arabia) Hamid Matar; (Saudi Arabia) Fahd bin Abdul-Aziz; (Qatar) Khalifa bin Hamad Al Thani; (Kuwait) Jaber Al-Ahmad Al-Sabah	(Ba'athist Iraq) Saddam Hussein; (Ba'athist Iraq) Izzat Ibrahim al-Douri; (Ba'athist Iraq) Salah Aboud Mahmoud

Units involved
(Saudi Arabia) 2nd SANG Brigade; (Saudi Arabia) Royal Saudi Marine Battalion; Qatar Tank Battalion; (United States) 1st Marine Division; (United States) 2nd Light Armored Infantry Battalion, 2nd Marine Division	(Ba'athist Iraq) 1st Mechanised Division; (Ba'athist Iraq) 3rd Armoured Division; (Ba'athist Iraq) 5th Mechanised Division

Casualties and losses
Coalition estimate: 45 killed (11 from friendly fire); 60 wounded; 2 captured; 9–12 armoured vehicles lost; 1 AC-130 shot down	Iraqi claims: 71 killed; 148 wounded; 702 missing; 186 armoured vehicles destroyed; Saudi Arabian estimate: 60–300 killed; 400 captured; 90 armoured vehicles destroyed

The Battle of Khafji was the first major ground engagement of the Gulf War. It took place in and around the Saudi Arabian city of Khafji, from 29 January to 1 February 1991.

Iraqi leader Saddam Hussein, who had already tried and failed to draw Coalition forces into costly ground engagements by shelling Saudi Arabian positions and oil storage tanks and firing Scud surface-to-surface missiles at Israel, ordered the invasion of Saudi Arabia from southern Kuwait. The 1st and 5th Mechanized Divisions and 3rd Armored Division were ordered to conduct a multi-pronged invasion toward Khafji, engaging Saudi Arabian, Kuwaiti, and U.S. forces along the coastline, with a supporting Iraqi commando force ordered to infiltrate further south by sea and harass the Coalition's rear.

These three divisions, which had suffered significant losses from attacks by Coalition aircraft in the preceding days, attacked on 29 January. Most of their attacks were repulsed by U.S. Marine Corps and U.S. Army forces but one of the Iraqi columns occupied Khafji on the night of 29–30 January. From 30 January to 1 February, two Saudi Arabian National Guard battalions and two Qatari tank companies attempted to retake control of the city, aided by Coalition aircraft and U.S. artillery. By 1 February, the city had been recaptured at the cost of 43 Coalition servicemen dead and 52 wounded. Iraqi Army fatalities numbered between 60 and 300, while an estimated 400 were captured as prisoners of war.

== Background ==
On 2 August 1990, the Iraqi Army invaded and occupied the neighboring state of Kuwait. The invasion, which followed the inconclusive Iran–Iraq War and three decades of political conflict with Kuwait, offered Saddam Hussein the opportunity to distract political dissent at home and add Kuwait's oil resources to Iraq's own.

In response, the United Nations began to pass a series of resolutions demanding the withdrawal of Iraqi forces from Kuwait. Afraid that Saudi Arabia would be invaded next, the Saudi Arabian government requested immediate military aid. As a result, the United States began marshalling forces from a variety of nations, styled the Coalition, on the Arabian peninsula. Initially, Saddam Hussein attempted to deter Coalition military action by threatening Kuwait's and Iraq's petroleum production and export. In December 1990, Iraq experimented with the use of explosives to destroy wellheads in the area of the Ahmadi loading complex, developing their capability to destroy Kuwait's petroleum infrastructure on a large scale. On 16 January, Iraqi artillery destroyed an oil storage tank in Khafji, Saudi Arabia, and on 19 January the pumps at the Ahmadi loading complex were opened, pouring crude oil into the Persian Gulf. The oil flowed into the sea at a rate of 200,000 barrels (32,000 m^{3}) a day, becoming one of the worst ecological disasters to that date.

Despite these Iraqi threats, the Coalition launched a 38-day aerial campaign on 17 January 1991. Flying an estimated 2,000 sorties a day, Coalition aircraft rapidly crippled the Iraqi air defense systems and effectively destroyed the Iraqi Air Force, whose daily sortie rate plummeted from a prewar level of an estimated 200 per day to almost none by 17 January. On the third day of the campaign, many Iraqi pilots fled across the Iranian border in their aircraft rather than be destroyed. The air campaign also targeted command-and-control sites, bridges, railroads, and petroleum storage facilities.

Saddam Hussein, who is believed to have said, "The air force has never decided a war," nevertheless worried that the air campaign would erode Iraq's national morale. The Iraqi leader also believed that the United States would not be willing to lose many troops in action, and therefore sought to draw Coalition ground troops into a decisive battle. In an attempt to provoke a ground battle, he directed Iraqi forces to launch Scud missiles against Israel, while continuing to threaten the destruction of oilfields in Kuwait. These efforts were unsuccessful in provoking a large ground battle, so Saddam Hussein decided to launch a limited offensive into Saudi Arabia with the aim of inflicting heavy losses on the Coalition armies.

As the air campaign continued, the Coalition's expectations of an Iraqi offensive decreased. As a result, the United States redeployed the XVIII Airborne Corps and the VII Corps 480 km (300 mi) to the west. The Coalition's leadership believed that should an Iraqi force go on the offensive, it would be launched from the al-Wafra oil fields, in Southern Kuwait.

== Order of battle ==
Coalition and Iraqi units deployed in the Kuwaiti Theater of Operations, as of 24–28 February 1991

The Iraqi Army had between 350,000 and 500,000 soldiers in theater, organized into 51 divisions, including eight Republican Guard divisions. Republican Guard units normally received the newest equipment; for example, most of the estimated 1,000 T-72 tanks in the Iraqi Army on the eve of the war were in Republican Guard divisions. The Iraqi Army in the Kuwaiti Theater of Operations (KTO) also included nine heavy divisions, composed mostly of professional soldiers, but with weapons of a generally lesser grade than those issued to the Republican Guard.

Most non-Republican Guard armored units had older tank designs, mainly the T-55 or its Chinese equivalents, the Type 59 and Type 69. The remaining 34 divisions were composed of poorly trained conscripts. These divisions were deployed to channel the Coalition's forces through a number of break points along the front, allowing the Iraqi Army's heavy divisions and the Republican Guard units to isolate them and counterattack. However, the Iraqis left their western flank open, failing to account for tactics made possible by the Global Positioning System and other new technologies.

In Saudi Arabia, the Coalition originally deployed over 200,000 soldiers, 750 aircraft and 1,200 tanks. This quickly grew to 3,600 tanks and over 600,000 personnel, of whom over 500,000 were from the United States.

=== Iraqi forces ===
Earmarked for the offensive into Saudi Arabia was the Iraqi Third Corps, the 1st Mechanized Division from Fourth Corps and a number of commando units. Third Corps, commanded by Major General Salah Aboud Mahmoud (who would also command the overall offensive), had the 3rd Armored Division and 5th Mechanized Division, as well as a number of infantry divisions. Fourth Corps' commander was Major General Ayad Khalil Zaki. The 3rd Armored Division had a number of T-72 tanks, the only non-Republican Guard force to have them, while the other armored battalions had T-62s and T-55s, a few of which had an Iraqi appliqué armor similar to the Soviet bulging armor also known as "brow" laminate armor or BDD.

During the battle of Khafji, these upgraded T-55s survived impacts from MILAN anti-tank missiles. These divisions also had armored personnel vehicles such as the BMP-1, scout vehicles such as the BRDM-2, and several types of artillery. Also deployed along this portion of the front, though not chosen to participate in the invasion, were five infantry divisions that were under orders to remain in their defensive positions along the border.

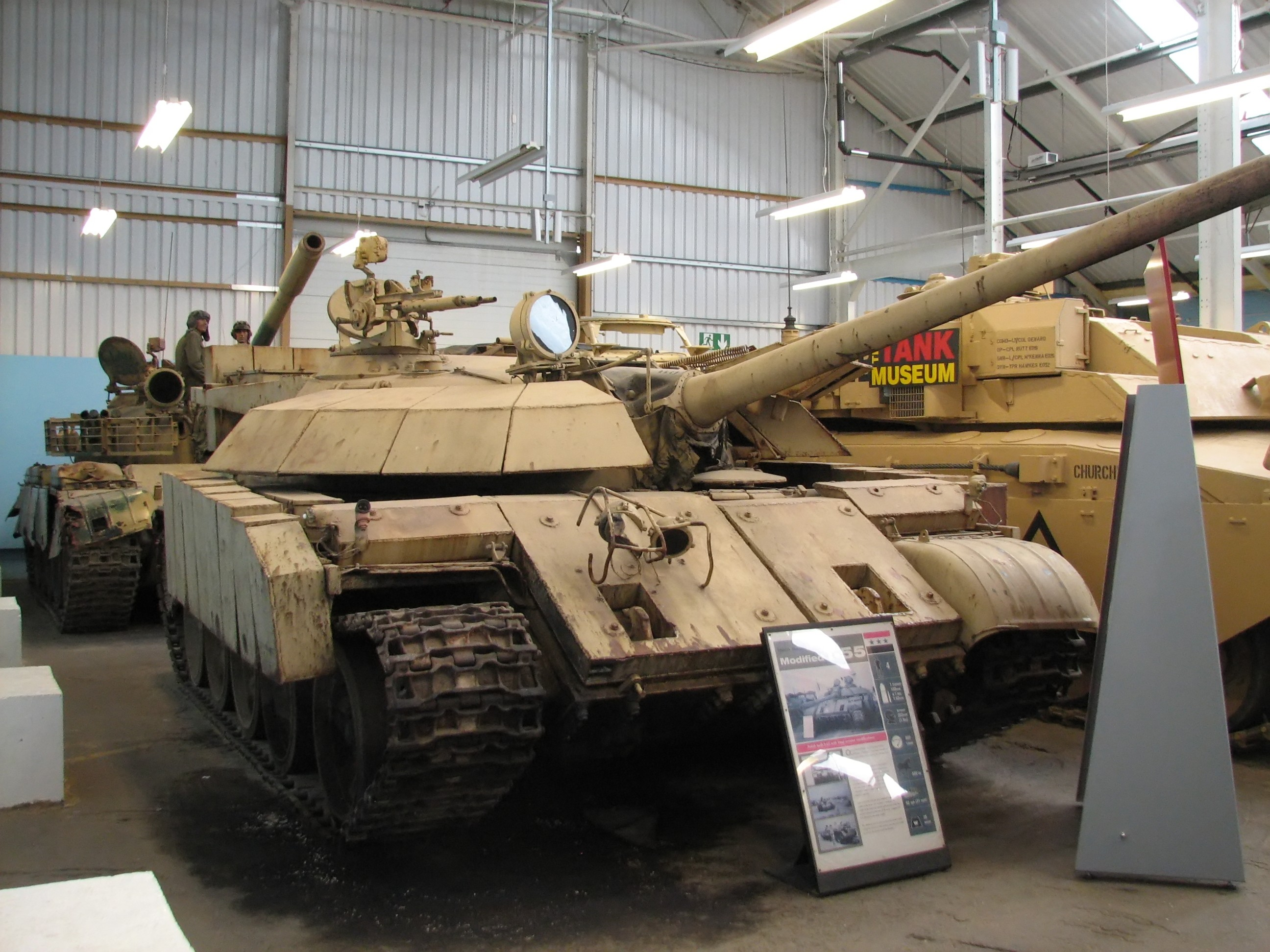
An Iraqi modification of the T-55 tank, codename Enigma, used during the battle

U.S. Marine Corps reconnaissance estimated that the Iraqi Army had amassed around 60,000 troops across the border, near the Kuwaiti town of Wafra, in as many as five or six divisions. Infantry divisions normally consisted of three brigades with an attached commando unit, although some infantry divisions could have up to eight brigades–however most infantry divisions along the border were understrength, primarily due to desertion.

Armored and mechanized divisions normally made use of three brigades, with each brigade having up to four combat battalions; depending on the division type, these were generally a three to one mix, with either three mechanized battalions and one armored battalion, or vice versa. Given the size of the forces deployed across the border, it is thought that the Iraqi Army planned to continue the offensive, after the successful capture of Khafji, in order to seize the valuable oil fields at Dammam.

The attack would consist of a four-prong offensive. The 1st Mechanized Division would pass through the 7th and 14th Infantry Divisions to protect the flank of the 3rd Armored Division, which would provide a blocking force west of Khafji while the 5th Mechanized Division took the town. The 1st Mechanized and 3rd Armored divisions would then retire to Kuwait, while the 5th Mechanized Division would wait until the Coalition launched a counteroffensive. The principal objectives were to inflict heavy casualties on the attacking Coalition soldiers and take prisoners of war, who Saddam Hussein theorized would be an excellent bargaining tool with the Coalition.

As the units moved to the Saudi Arabian border, many were attacked by Coalition aircraft. Around the Al-Wafrah forest, about 1,000 Iraqi armored fighting vehicles were attacked by Harrier aircraft with Rockeye cluster bombs. Another Iraqi convoy of armored vehicles was hit by A-10s, which destroyed the first and last vehicles, before systematically attacking the stranded remainders. Such air raids prevented the majority of the Iraqi troops deployed for the offensive from taking part in it.

Iraqi armored fighting vehicles at Khafji
	T-72	T-55	T-62	BMP-1
Weight	37.6 t (41.5 short tons)	36 t (39.7 tons)	40 t (44 tons)	13.9 t (15.3 tons)
Gun	125 mm 2A46D smoothbore (4.92 inches)	100 mm D-10T2S rifled (3.94 in)	115 mm U-5T smoothbore (4.53 in)	73 mm 2A2B Grom low-pressure gun (2.9 in)
Ammunition	44 rounds	43 rounds	40 rounds	40 rounds
Road range	480 km (300 mi)	500 km (310 mi)	300–450 km (190–280 mi)	500 km (310 mi)
Engine output	580 kW (790 PS; 780 hp)	433 kW (589 PS; 581 hp)	433 kW (589 PS; 581 hp)	224 kW (305 PS; 300 hp)
Maximum speed (on road)	60 km/h (37 mph)	51 km/h (32 mph)	50 km/h (31 mph)	65 km/h (40 mph)

=== Coalition forces ===
During the buildup of forces, the U.S. had built observation posts along the Kuwaiti-Saudi Arabian border to gather intelligence on Iraqi forces. These were manned by U.S. Navy SEALs, U.S. Marine Corps Force Reconnaissance and Army Special Forces personnel. Observation post 8 was farthest to the east, on the coast, and another seven observation posts were positioned each 20 km (12 mi) until the end of the "heel", the geographic panhandle of southernmost Kuwait. Observation posts 8 and 7 overlooked the coastal highway that ran to Khafji, considered the most likely invasion route of the city. 1st Marine Division had three companies positioned at observation posts 4, 5 and 6 (Task Force Shepard), while the 2nd Marine Division's 2nd Light Armored Infantry Battalion set up a screen between observation post 1 and the Al-Wafrah oil fields. The U.S. Army's 2nd Armored Division provided its 1st Brigade to give the Marines some much needed armored support.

The Saudi Arabians gave responsibility for the defense of Khafji to the 2nd Saudi Arabian National Guard Brigade, attached to Task Force Abu Bakr. The 5th Battalion of the 2nd Saudi Arabian National Guard Brigade set up a screen north and west of Khafji, under observation post 7. At the time, a Saudi Arabian National Guard Brigade could have up to four motorized battalions, each with three line companies. The brigade had a nominal strength of an estimated 5,000 soldiers. The Saudi Arabians also deployed the Tariq Task Force, composed of Saudi Arabian marines, a Moroccan mechanized infantry battalion, and two Senegalese infantry companies. Two further task forces, Othman and Omar Task Forces, consisted of two Mechanized Ministry of Defense and Aviation Brigades, providing screens about 3 km (1.9 mi) south of the border. The road south of Khafji was covered by one battalion of Saudi Arabian National Guard supported by one battalion of Qatari tanks. The country's main defenses were placed 20 km (12 mi) south of the screen.

The majority of the Arab contingent was led by General Khaled bin Sultan. The forces around Khafji were organized into the Joint Forces Command-East, while Joint Forces Command-North defended the border between observation post 1 and the Kuwaiti-Iraqi border.

The "heel" of Kuwait

Coalition armored fighting vehicles at Khafji
	AMX-30	V-150	LAV-25
Weight	36 t (39.7 short tons)	10 t (11.02 tons)	16.3 t (18 tons)
Gun	105 mm modele F1 rifled (4.13 inches)	90 mm Cockerill rifled (3.54 i)	25 mm autocannon (0.98 in)
Ammunition	50 rounds	39 rounds	420 rounds
Road range	600 km (370 mi)	643 km (400 mi)	660 km (410 mi)
Engine output	780 PS (573.7 kW)	202 PS (148.6 kW)	350 PS (257.4 kW)
Maximum speed	60 km/h (37 mph)	88 km/h (55 mph)	99 km/h (62 mph)

== Battle ==
On 27 January 1991, Iraqi President Saddam Hussein met in Basra with the two Iraqi army corps commanders who were to lead the operation, and Major General Salah Mahmoud told him that Khafji would be his by 30 January. During his return trip to Baghdad, Saddam Hussein's convoy was attacked by Coalition aircraft; the Iraqi leader escaped unscathed.

Throughout 28 January, the Coalition received a number of warnings suggesting an impending Iraqi offensive. The Coalition was flying two brand-new E-8A Joint Surveillance Target Attack Radar System (Joint STARS) aircraft, which picked up the deployment and movement of Iraqi forces to the area opposite of Khafji. Observation posts 2, 7 and 8 also detected heavy Iraqi reconnoitering along the border, and their small teams of air-naval gunfire liaison Marines called in air and artillery strikes throughout the day. Lieutenant Colonel Richard Barry, commander of the forward headquarters of the 1st Surveillance, Reconnaissance and Intelligence Group, sent warnings about an impending attack to Central Command. CentCom leaders were too preoccupied with the air campaign to heed them however, and so the Iraqi operation came as a surprise.

=== Beginning of Iraqi offensive: 29 January ===
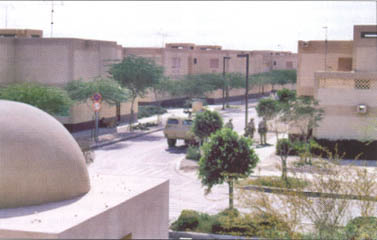
A view of the city of Khafji, prior to the battle

The Iraqi offensive began on the night of 29 January, when approximately 2,000 soldiers in several hundred armored fighting vehicles moved south. Post-war analysis by the US Air Force's Air University suggests Iraq planned to utilize the 3rd Armored Division and 5th Mechanized Division to make the actual attack on Khafji, with the 1st Mechanized Division assigned to protect the attacking force's western flank. The Iraqi incursion into Saudi Arabia consisted of three columns, mostly made up of T-62 tanks and armored personnel carriers (APCs). The Gulf War's first ground engagement was near observation post 4 (OP-4), built on the Al-Zabr police building. Elements of the Iraqi 6th Armored Brigade, ordered to take the heights above Al-Zabr, engaged Coalition units at Al-Zabr. At 20:00 hours, U.S. Marines at the observation post, who had noticed large groups of armored vehicles through their night vision devices, attempted to talk to battalion headquarters but received no response. Since contact earlier was no problem, there was a strong presumption that the reconnaissance platoon's radios were being jammed. Using runners, Lieutenant Ross alerted his platoon and continued trying to get through and inform higher headquarters and Company D of the oncoming Iraqi force. Contact was not established until 20:30 hours, which prompted Task Force Shepard to respond to the threat. Coalition soldiers at observation post 4 were lightly armed, and could only respond with TOW anti-tank missiles before calling in air support. Air support arrived by 21:30 and took the form of several F-15E, F-16C, four A-10 ground-attack aircraft and three AC-130 gunships, which intervened in a heavy firefight between Iraqi and Coalition ground forces at OP-4. The reconnaissance platoon stationed at OP-4 was the first to come under attack, their withdrawal from the engagement was facilitated by another company providing cover fire. The attempt by the soldiers stationed at OP-4 to fend off or delay the Iraqi advance cost them several casualties, and in the face of a heavy Iraqi response they were forced to retire south, by order of its commanding officer.

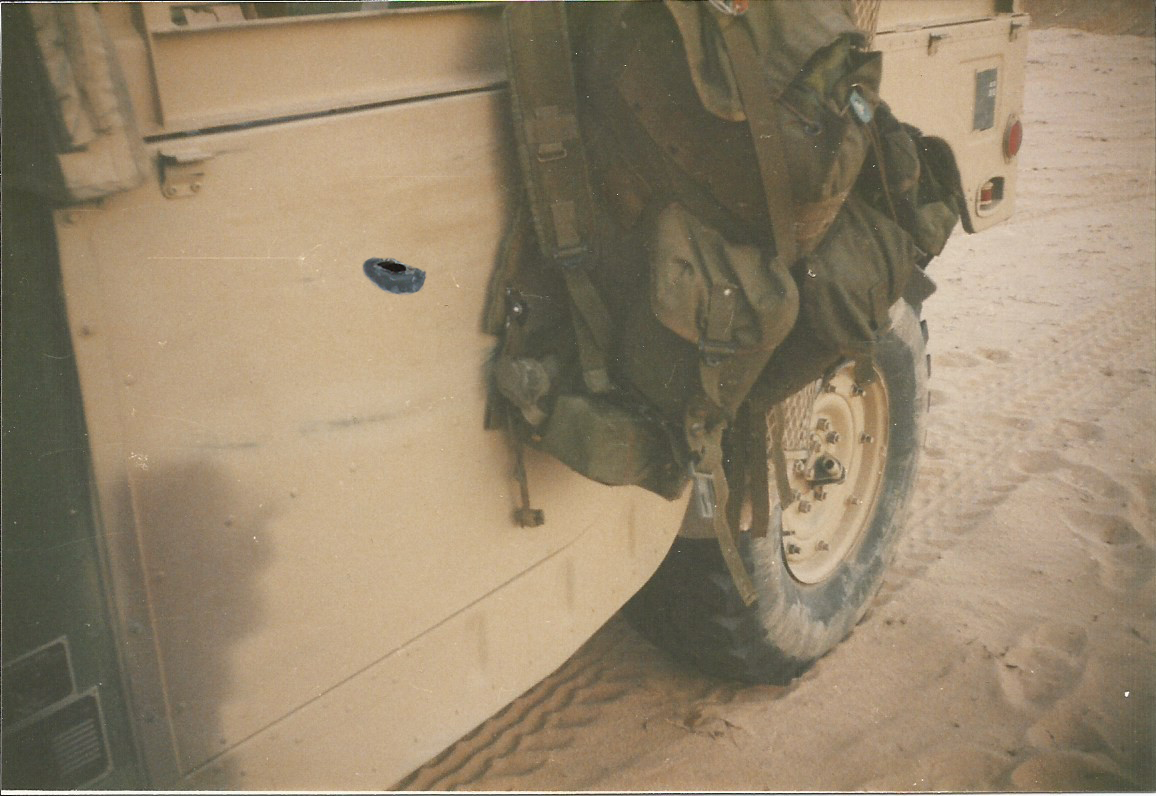
Humvee driven by Marine Corporal Richard Lovell, hit by small arms fire during 1st Major Iraqi ground offensive in Battle of Khafji

To cover the withdrawal, the company's platoon of LAV-25s and LAV-ATs (anti-tank variants) moved to engage the Iraqi force. After receiving permission, one of the anti-tank vehicles opened fire at what it believed was an Iraqi tank. Instead, the missile destroyed a friendly LAV-AT a few hundred meters in front of it. Despite this loss, the platoon continued forward and soon opened fire on the Iraqi tanks with the LAV-25s' autocannons. The fire could not penetrate the tanks' armor, but did damage their optics and prevented the tanks from fighting back effectively.

Soon thereafter, a number of A-10 ground-attack aircraft arrived but found it difficult to pinpoint enemy targets and began dropping flares to illuminate the zone. One of these flares landed on a friendly vehicle, and although the vehicle radioed in its position, it was hit by an AGM-65 Maverick air-to-ground missile that killed the entire crew except for the driver. Following the incident, the company was withdrawn and the remaining vehicles reorganized into another nearby company. With observation post 4 cleared, the Iraqi 6th Armored Brigade withdrew over the border to Al-Wafrah under heavy fire from Coalition aircraft. Coalition forces had lost 11 troops to friendly fire and none to enemy action.

While the events at observation post 4 were unfolding, the Iraqi 5th Mechanized Division crossed the Saudi Arabian border near observation post 1. A Company of the 2nd Light Infantry Armored Battalion, which was screening the Iraqi unit, reported a column of 60–100 BMPs. The column was engaged by Coalition A-10s and Harrier jump jets. This was then followed by another column with an estimated 29 tanks. One of the column's T-62 tanks was engaged by an anti-tank missile and destroyed. Coalition air support, provided by A-10s and F-16s, engaged the Iraqi drive through observation post 1 and ultimately repulsed the attack back over the Kuwaiti border. Aircraft continued to engage the columns throughout the night, until the next morning. Another column of Iraqi tanks, approaching observation post 2, were engaged by aircraft and also repulsed that night.

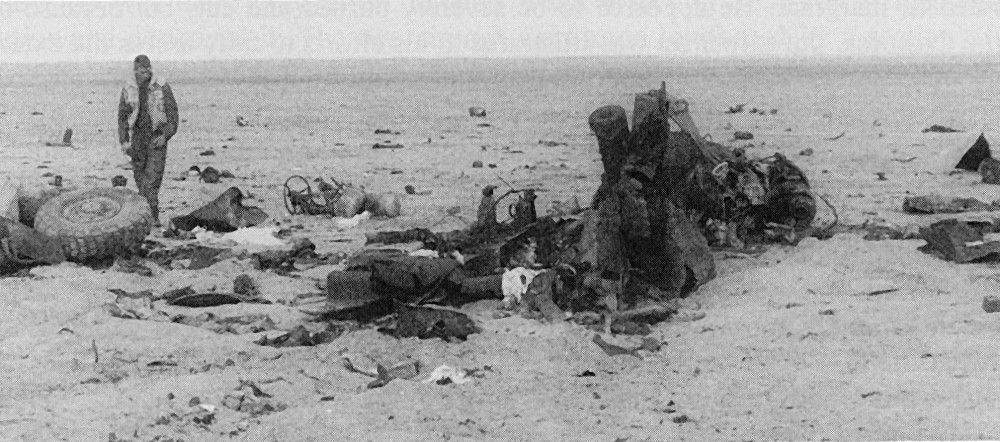
LAV-AT destroyed by a friendly anti-tank missile during the fighting around observation post 4, near Al Wafra

An additional Iraqi column crossed the Saudi Arabian border to the East, although still along the coast, towards the city of Khafji. These Iraqi tanks were screened by the 5th Mechanized Battalion of the 2nd Saudi Arabian National Guard Brigade. This battalion withdrew when it came under heavy fire, as it had been ordered to not engage the Iraqi column. Elements of the 8th and 10th Saudi Arabian National Guard Brigades also conducted similar screening operations. Due to the order to not engage, the road to Khafji was left open. At one point, Iraqi T-55s of another column rolled up to the Saudi Arabian border, signaling that they intended to surrender. As they were approached by Saudi Arabian troops, they reversed their turrets and opened fire. This prompted air support from a nearby AC-130, destroying 13 vehicles.

Nevertheless, the Iraqi advance towards Khafji continued on this sector, despite repeated attacks from an AC-130. Attempts by the Saudi Arabian commanders to call in additional air strikes on the advancing Iraqi column failed when the requested heavy air support never arrived. Khafji was occupied by approximately 00:30 on 30 January, trapping two six-man reconnaissance teams from the 1st Marine Division in the city. The teams occupied two apartment buildings in the southern sector of the city and called artillery fire on their position to persuade the Iraqis to call off a search of the area. Throughout the night, Coalition air support composed of helicopters and fixed-wing aircraft continued to engage Iraqi tanks and artillery.

=== Initial response: 30 January ===
Distressed by the occupation of Khafji, Saudi Arabian commander General Khaled bin Sultan appealed to U.S. General Norman Schwarzkopf for an immediate air campaign against Iraqi forces in and around the city. However, this was turned down because the buildings would make it difficult for aircraft to spot targets without getting too close. It was instead decided that the city would be retaken by Arab ground forces. The task fell to the 2nd Saudi Arabian National Guard Brigade's 7th Battalion, composed of Saudi Arabian infantry with V-150 armored cars and two Qatari tank companies attached to the task force. These were supported by U.S. Army Special Forces and Marine Reconnaissance personnel.

The force was put under the command of Saudi Arabian Lieutenant Colonel Matar, who moved out by 17:00 hours. The force met up with elements of the U.S. 3rd Marine Regiment, south of Khafji, and were ordered to directly attack the city. A platoon of Iraqi T-55s attacked south of the city and were engaged by Qatari AMX-30s, leading to the destruction of three of the Iraqi tanks and the capture of a fourth. Lacking any coordinated artillery support, artillery fire was provided by the 10th Marine Regiment.

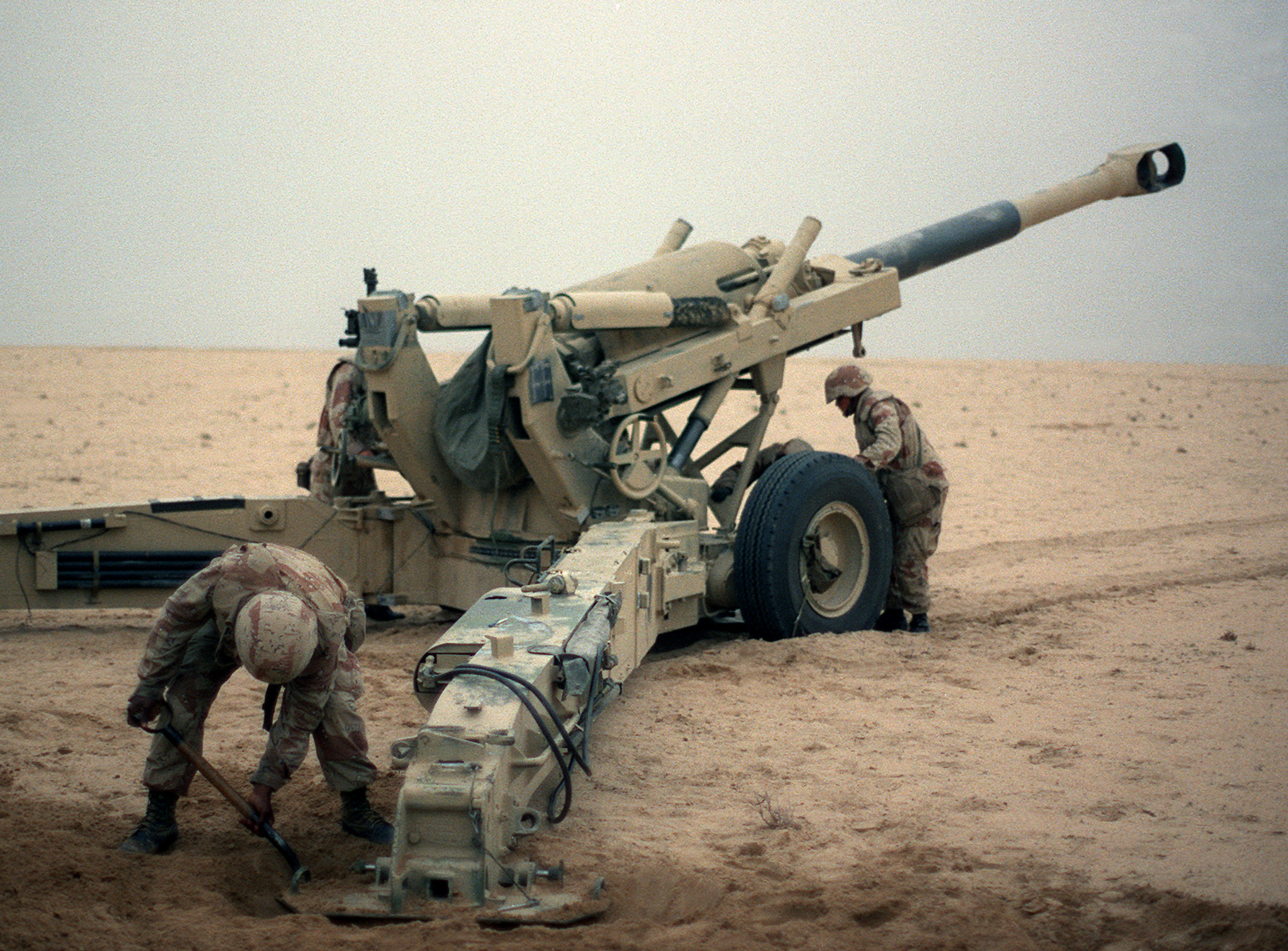
Supporting artillery from the 10th Marine Regiment

The initial attempt to retake the city was preceded by a 15-minute preparatory barrage by U.S. Marine artillery. The Saudi Arabian assault was repulsed with the loss of one V-150 after coming under heavy Iraqi fire. The Saudi Arabians subsequently reinforced the 7th Battalion with two more companies from adjacent Saudi Arabian units.

Meanwhile, 2nd Saudi Arabian National Guard Brigade's 5th Battalion moved north of Khafji to block Iraqi reinforcements attempting to reach the city. This unit was further bolstered by the 8th Ministry of Defense and Aviation Brigade, and heavily aided by Coalition air support. Although fear of friendly fire forced the 8th Ministry of Defense and Aviation Brigade to pull back the following morning, Coalition aircraft successfully hindered Iraqi attempts to move more soldiers down to Khafji and caused large numbers of Iraqi troops to surrender to Saudi Arabian forces.

That night, two U.S. Army heavy equipment transporters entered the city of Khafji, apparently lost, and were fired upon by Iraqi troops. Although one truck managed to turn around and escape, the two drivers of the second truck were wounded and captured. This led to a rescue mission organized by 3rd Battalion 3rd Marine Regiment, which sent a force of 30 men to extract the two wounded drivers. Although encountering no major opposition, they did not find the two drivers who had, by this time, been taken prisoner. The Marines did find a burnt out Qatari AMX-30, with its dead crew. In the early morning hours, despite significant risk to their safety, an AC-130 providing overwatch stayed beyond sunrise. It was shot down by an Iraqi surface-to-air missile (SAM), killing the aircraft's crew of 14.

The interdiction on the part of Coalition aircraft and Saudi Arabian and Qatari ground forces was having an effect on the occupying Iraqi troops. Referring to Saddam Hussein's naming of the ground engagement as the "mother of all battles", Iraqi General Salah radioed in a request to withdraw, stating, "The mother was killing her children." Since the beginning of the battle, Coalition aircraft had flown at least 350 sorties against Iraqi units in the area and on the night of 30–31 January, Coalition air support also began to attack units of the Iraqi Third Corps assembled on the Saudi Arabian border.

=== Recapture of Khafji: 31 January – 1 February ===
On 31 January, the effort to retake the city began anew. The attack was launched at 08:30 hours, and was met by heavy but mostly inaccurate Iraqi fire; however, three Saudi Arabian V-150 armored cars were knocked out by RPG-7s at close range. The 8th battalion of the Saudi Arabian brigade was ordered to deploy to the city by 10:00 hours, while 5th Battalion to the north engaged another column of Iraqi tanks attempting to reach the city. The latter engagement led to the destruction of around 13 Iraqi tanks and armored personnel carriers, and the capture of 6 more vehicles and 116 Iraqi soldiers, costing the Saudi Arabian battalion two dead and two wounded. The 8th Battalion engaged the city from the northeast, linking up with 7th Battalion. These units cleared the southern portion of the city, until 7th Battalion withdrew south to rest and rearm at 18:30 hours, while the 8th remained in Khafji. The two Qatari tank companies, with U.S. Marine artillery and air support, moved north of the city to block Iraqi reinforcements.

The 8th continued clearing buildings and by the time the 7th had withdrawn to the south, the Saudi Arabians had lost approximately 18 dead and 50 wounded, as well as seven V-150 vehicles. Coalition aircraft continued to provide heavy support throughout the day and night. A veteran of the Iran-Iraq War later mentioned that Coalition airpower "imposed more damage on his brigade in half an hour than it had sustained in eight years of fighting against the Iranians." During the battle, an Iraqi amphibious force was sent to land on the coast and moved into Khafji. As the boats made their way through the Persian Gulf towards Khafji, U.S. and British aircraft caught the Iraqi boats in the open and destroyed over 90% of the Iraqi amphibious force.

The Saudi Arabian and Kuwaiti units renewed operations the following day. Two Iraqi companies, with about 20 armored vehicles, remained in the city and had not attempted to break out during the night. While the Saudi Arabian 8th Battalion continued operations in the southern portion of the city, the 7th Battalion began to clear the northern sector of the city. Iraqi resistance was sporadic and most Iraqi soldiers surrendered on sight; as a result, the city was recaptured on 1 February 1991.

== Aftermath ==
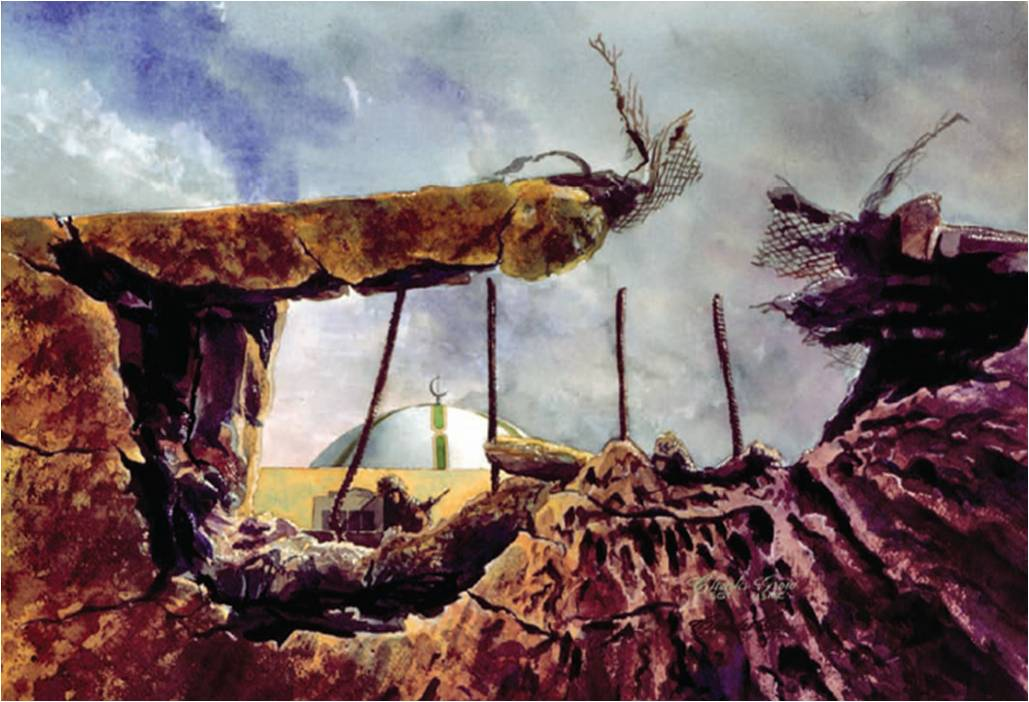
Marines of the U.S. 3rd Battalion 3rd Marines, depicted in the painting Cleaning up Khafji

During the battle, Coalition forces incurred 43 fatalities and 52 injured casualties. This included 25 Americans killed, 11 of them by friendly fire along with 14 airmen killed when their AC-130 was shot down by Iraqi SAMs. The U.S. also had two soldiers wounded and another two soldiers were captured in Khafji.

Saudi Arabian casualties totaled 18 killed and 50 wounded. Two Saudi main battle tanks and ten lightly armored V-150s were knocked out. Most of the V150s were knocked out by RPG-7 fire in close-range fighting inside the town of Khafji. One of the two main battle tanks was hit by a 100mm main gun round from a T-55.

Iraq listed its casualties as 71 dead, 148 wounded and 702 missing. U.S. sources present at the battle claim that 300 Iraqis lost their lives, and at least 90 vehicles were destroyed. Another source suggests that 60 Iraqi soldiers were killed and at least 400 taken prisoner, while no less than 80 armored vehicles were knocked out; however these casualties are attributed to the fighting both inside and directly north of Khafji.

Whatever the exact casualties, the majority of three Iraqi mechanized/armored divisions had been destroyed.

The Iraqi capture of Khafji was a major propaganda victory for Iraq: on 30 January Iraqi radio claimed that they had "expelled Americans from the Arab territory". For many in the Arab world, the battle of Khafji was seen as an Iraqi victory, and Hussein made every possible effort to turn the battle into a political victory. On the other side, confidence within the United States Armed Forces in the abilities of the Saudi Arabian and Kuwaiti armies increased as the battle progressed. After Khafji, the Coalition's leadership began to sense that the Iraqi Army was a "hollow force" and it provided them with an impression of the degree of resistance they would face during the Coalition's ground offensive that would begin later that month. The battle was felt by the Saudi Arabian government to be a major propaganda victory, which had successfully defended its territory.

Despite the success of the engagements between 29 January and 1 February, the Coalition did not launch its main offensive into Kuwait and Iraq until the night of 24–25 February. The invasion of Iraq was completed about 48 hours later. The Battle of Khafji served as a modern example of the ability of air power to serve a supporting role to ground forces. It offered the Coalition an indication of the manner in which Operation Desert Storm would be fought, but also hinted at future friendly-fire casualties which accounted for nearly half of the U.S. dead.

== Sources ==
- Biddle, Stephen (Autumn 1996). "Victory Misunderstood: What the Gulf War Tells us About the Future of Conflict". International Security. 21 (2). The MIT Press: 139–179. doi:10.2307/2539073. JSTOR 2539073.
- "Gulf War Facts". CNN. Archived from the original on 12 June 2008.
- Foss, Christopher F. (2006). Jane's Tank Recognition Guide. London, United Kingdom: Harper Collins. ISBN 978-0-00-718326-5.
- Freedman, Lawrence; Efraim Karsh (Autumn 1991). "How Kuwait Was Won: Strategy in the Gulf War". International Security. 16 (2). The MIT Press: 5–41. doi:10.2307/2539059. JSTOR 2539059. S2CID 154290155.
- Halliday, Fred (April 1991). "The Gulf War and its Aftermath: First Reflections". International Affairs. 67 (2). Blackwell Publishing: 223–234. doi:10.2307/2620827. JSTOR 2620827. S2CID 154565052.
- Jamieson, Perry (2001). Lucrative Targets: The U.S. Air Force in the Kuwaiti Theater of Operations. Air Force History and Museums Program. ISBN 0160509580.
- Lewis, Michael W. (July 2003). "The Law of Aerial Bombardment in the 1991 Gulf War". The American Journal of International Law. 97 (3). American Society of International Law: 481–509. doi:10.2307/3109837. JSTOR 3109837. S2CID 144600724.
- Mahnken, Thomas G.; Barry D. Watts (Autumn 1997). "What the Gulf War Can (and Cannot) Tell Us about the Future of Warfare". International Security. 22 (2). The MIT Press: 151–162. doi:10.2307/2539371. JSTOR 2539371.
- Ogorkiewicz, Richard M. (December 1973). AMX-30 Battle Tank. Berkshire, United Kingdom: Profile Publications Ltd. OCLC 54349455.
- Perrett, Bryan (1995). Iron Fist: Classic Armoured Warfare Case Studies. London, United Kingdom: Brockhampton Press. ISBN 1-86019-954-2.
- Press, Daryl G. (Autumn 2001). "The Myth of Air Power in the Persian Gulf War and the Future of Warfare". International Security. 26 (2). The MIT Press: 4–44. doi:10.1162/016228801753191123. S2CID 57568401.
- Rottman, Gordon (1993). Armies of the Gulf War. Oxford, United Kingdom: Osprey. p. 64. ISBN 1-85532-277-3.
- Stanton, Martin N. (1 March 1996). "The Saudi Arabian National Guard Motorized Brigade" (PDF). ARMOR magazine. Fort Knox, Kentucky: US Army Armor Center: 6–11. ISSN 0004-2420. Archived (PDF) from the original on 5 November 2016.
- Titus, James (September 1996). "The Battle of Khafji: An Overview and Preliminary Analysis" (PDF). College of Aerospace Doctrine, Research and Education Air University. Archived from the original (PDF) on 25 February 2009.
- Westermeyer, Paul W. (2008). "U.S. Marines in Battle: Al-Khafji, 28 January–1 February 1991" (PDF). Washington D.C., United States of America: History Division, U.S. Marine Corps. Archived (PDF) from the original on 17 January 2018.
- Westermeyer, Paul (2014). Liberating Kuwait (PDF). Quantico, VA: History Division, United States Marine Corps. ISBN 978-0-9911588-2-9. Archived (PDF) from the original on 20 February 2022.
- Williams, Scott (June 2002). The Battle of Al-Khafji (PDF) (Master's). Naval Postgraduate School. hdl:10945/5686. Archived (PDF) from the original on 13 March 2019.
- Zaloga, Steven J. (1995). BMP Infantry Fighting Vehicle 1967–94. Oxford, United Kingdom: Osprey. ISBN 1-85532-433-4.
- Tucker-Jones, Anthony (2014). The Gulf War: Operation Desert Storm 1990-1991. Pen and Sword. ISBN 978-1473837089.
- Zaloga, Steven J. (1979). Modern Soviet Armor: Combat Vehicles of the USSR and Warsaw Pact Today. Edinburgh, United Kingdom: Prentice Hall. ISBN 0-13-597856-4.
- Zaloga, Steven J. (2004). T-54 and T-55 Main Battle Tanks 1944–2004. Oxford, United Kingdom: Osprey. ISBN 1-84176-792-1.
- Zaloga, Steven J.; (Lt. Col.) James W. Loop (1982). Modern American Armor: Combat Vehicles of the United States Army Today. New York City: Arms and Armour Press. ISBN 0-85368-248-8.
- Zaloga, Steven J. (1993). T-72 Main Battle Tank 1974–93. Oxford, United Kingdom: Osprey. ISBN 1-85532-338-9.
