= Cattan =

Cattan may refer to:

- Saint Cathan, 6th century Irish monk in Scotland
- Christopher Cattan (fl. 16th century), Italian author
- Henry Cattan (1906–1992), Palestinian jurist
- Olivia Cattan (born 1967), French writer and activist
- Ziyad Cattan, businessman accused of massive fraud in US-occupied Iraq

== See also ==
- Ebrahim Al-Cattan (born 1963), Kuwaiti fencer
- Catan, a board game
