= Salah Aboud Mahmoud =

Iraqi Army general (1942–2024)

Lieutenant General Salah Aboud Mahmoud
- صلاح عبود محمود
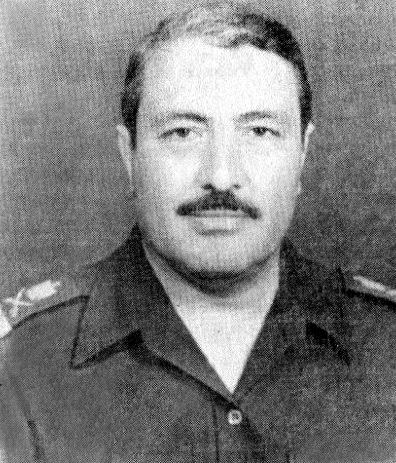
- Salah during war
- Born: 1942; Fallujah, Kingdom of Iraq
- Died: 21 June 2024 (aged 82); Amman, Jordan
- Military career
- Allegiance: Iraq
- Branch: Iraqi Ground Forces
- Service years: 1962–2003
- Rank: Lieutenant General
- Unit: 3rd Corps (Iraq)
- Commands: 3rd Corps (Iraq); 3rd Tawakalna ala-Allah Armoured Division; 1st Division (Iraq); 5th Division (Iraq)
- Conflicts: First Iraqi-Kurdish War; Iran–Iraq War; Tawakalna ala Allah Operations; Persian Gulf War; Battle of Khafji; Battle of 73 Easting
- Awards: Order of the Two Rivers (Second Class); Mother of All Battles Medal

Lieutenant General Salah Aboud Mahmoud (Arabic: صلاح عبود محمود, 1942 – 21 June 2024) was an Iraqi military officer, best known for his role in the battles of Khafji and 73 Easting, during the Gulf War.

== Career ==
On 29 January 1991, Mahmoud took part in battle with coalition forces to take control of the Saudi Arabian city of Khafji. Mahmoud also took part in the Iran–Iraq War of 1980–1988, along with the tank battle of 73 Easting in the Gulf War.

Mahmoud was appointed commander of the Iraqi Third Corps in the aftermath of the Iran–Iraq War, a regular process in the Iraqi military to ensure that former high-ranking officers did not pose a threat to the Ba'athist Iraqi government. He was later governor of Dhi Qar Province, a Shia province which had briefly been taken by the 1991 Iraqi uprising before it was brutally suppressed.

=== 1990s ===
In December 1994, Major-General Wafiq Al-Samarrai defected to Jordan and called on officers to revolt against Saddam Hussein's government. Mahmoud was one of them he called on. He did not, and despite his connections to many of the purged officers he was never executed. Rather, he was gradually forced out of his government roles. President Hussein divided Iraq into four administrative regions in 1998. Many expected Mahmoud would be recalled to the military and appointed to the Central Euphrates governorship as governor Mizban Khadr al-Hadi had been dismissed. However this did not come to pass and Mizban was reinstated.

=== Invasion of Iraq ===
After the invasion of Iraq in March 2003, Mahmoud disappeared and had not been heard from or seen since until he died on 21 June 2024, at the age of 82. He was buried in the Sahab Islamic Cemetery in Amman, Jordan.

== See also ==
- List of solved missing person cases (2000s)
