= Najah al-Shammari =

36th Iraqi Minister of Defense

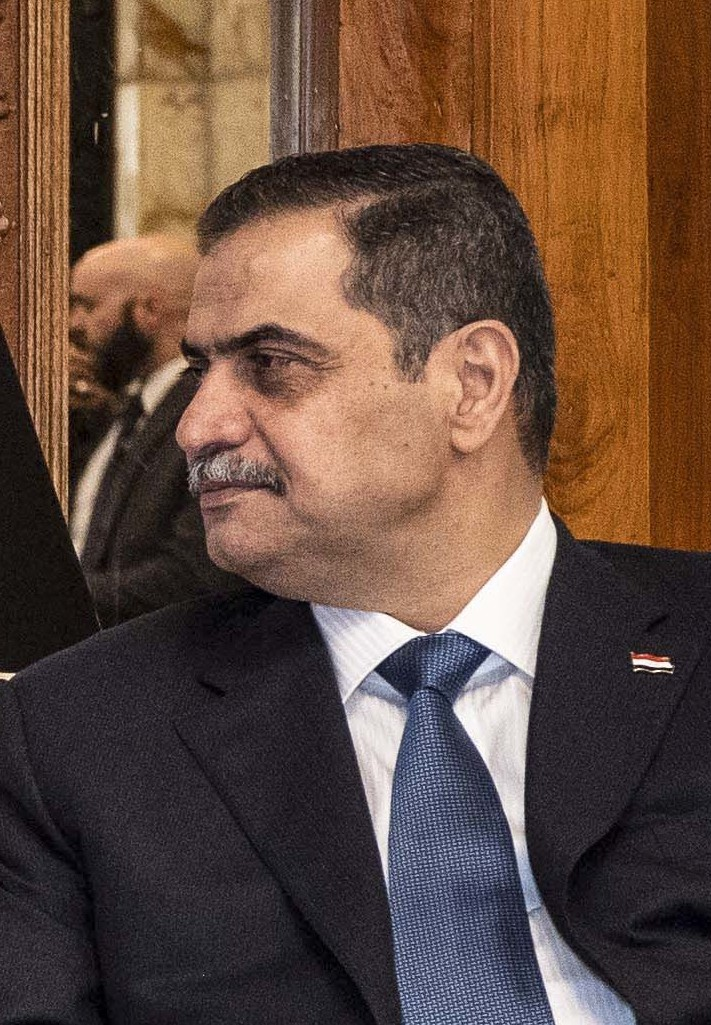

Minister of Defence
- In office 24 June 2019 – 6 May 2020
- Prime Minister: Adil Abdul-Mahdi
- Preceded by: Erfan al-Hiyali
- Succeeded by: Juma Inad

Personal details
- Born: Najah Hassan Ali al-Shammari; 1967 (age 58–59) Baghdad, Iraqi Republic
- Citizenship: Iraq; Sweden (since 2015)
- Party: al-Wataniya (coalition)
- Education: Iraqi Military Academy
- Profession: Military officer

Military service
- Allegiance: Iraq
- Branch/service: Iraqi Army
- Rank: Major general
- Unit: Iraqi Special Operations Forces

Najah Hassan Ali al-Shammari (Arabic: نجاح علي الشمري; born 1967) is an Iraqi politician and military officer who served as the Minister of Defense from June 2019 to May 2020. He holds Swedish citizenship.

== Background ==
Al-Shammari was born in Baghdad. He is a member of the Shammar tribe (one of the largest and most influential Arab tribes). Al-Shammari graduated from the Iraqi Military Academy in 1987 with a bachelor's degree in military science. He also has a master's degree in strategic planning for national security. Al-Shammari later served as a commander in the Iraqi Special Operations Forces and has held many military positions from 2003 until 2007. He retired in 2018 with the rank of major general.

== Defence minister ==
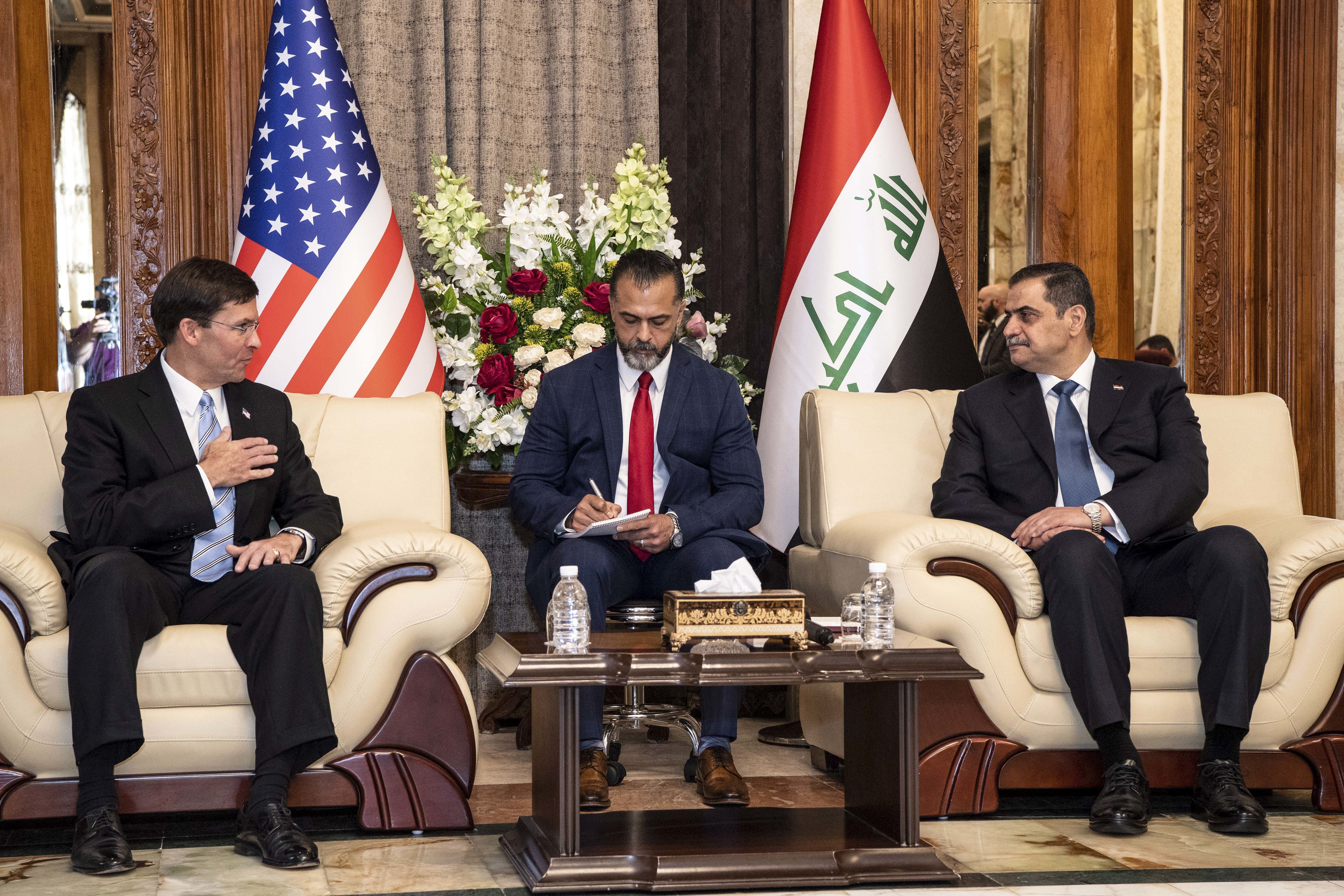
Al-Shammari (right) in a meeting with United States secretary of defense Mark Esper in 2019.

On June 24, 2019, al-Shammari was approved by the Iraqi parliament as defence minister of Iraq in Adil Abdul-Mahdi's cabinet. He was nominated to the post by the al-Wataniya coalition, led by former prime minister and then vice president of Iraq Ayad Allawi.

== Reports of dual Iraqi-Swedish citizenship and criminal charges in Sweden ==
In April 2019, prior to the nomination of al-Shammari as a candidate for the post of defence minister, there were reports in Iraqi media that al-Shammari has dual Iraqi-Swedish citizenship. The claims were rejected as false by a representative of the al-Wataniya coalition.

In November 2019, the Swedish news website Nyheter Idag reported that al-Shammari is a Swedish citizen registered as a resident in a Stockholm suburb under an alternative surname (this surname was reported to be the name of al-Shammari's clan within the Shammar tribe). According to the report, which was confirmed by Swedish authorities, al-Shammari applied for a residence permit in Sweden in 2009 and became a Swedish citizen in 2015. It was also reported that al-Shammari was granted several state welfare benefits in Sweden, including full time sick leave, while he did not declare any (or for some years only very low) income from work. He has also been the subject of several criminal investigations in Sweden, although he was never convicted of a crime.

The Swedish police launched a preliminary investigation into benefit fraud and civil registration violations against al-Shammari after allegedly claiming child and housing support for years despite living in Baghdad. The Swedish Prosecution Authority also announced that it had started an investigation for crimes against humanity against "an Iraqi minister", whom Swedish media identified as al-Shammari. Criminal charges were subsequently dropped and al-Shammari returned to Sweden.

On 18 March 2024, al-Shammari was arrested by Swedish police upon his arrival at Arlanda Airport on charges relating to the fraudulent welfare benefits.

Political offices
Preceded by Erfan al-Hiyali	Defence Minister of Iraq; 2019–2020	Succeeded by Juma Inad Saadoun
