= Juma Inad =

37th Iraqi Minister of Defense (born 1956)

- جمعة عناد
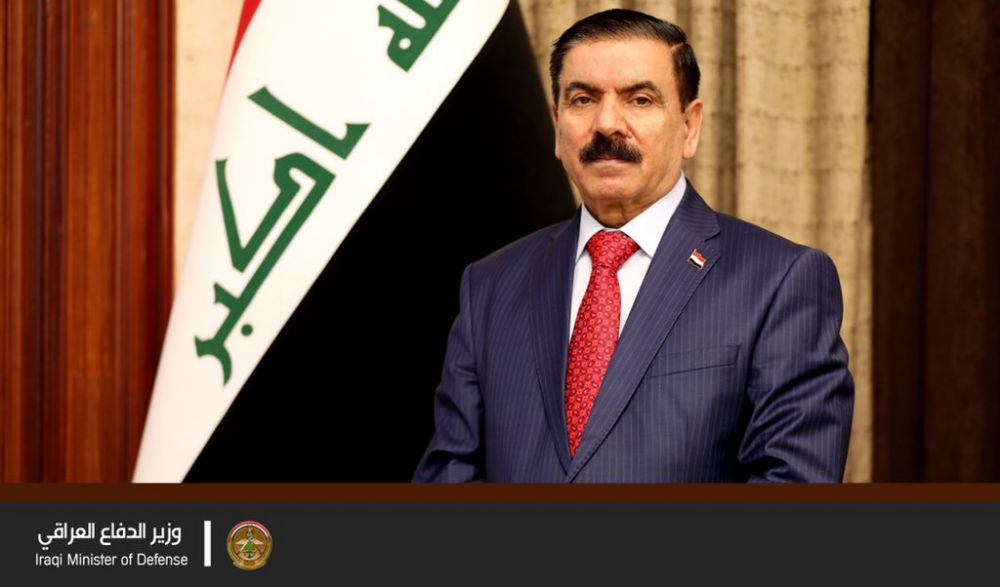

Minister of Defence of Iraq
- In office 6 May 2020 – 27 October 2022
- Prime Minister: Mustafa Al-Kadhimi
- Preceded by: Najah al-Shammari
- Succeeded by: Thabit al-Abbasi

Personal details
- Born: 1956 (age 69–70) Tikrit, Iraq
- Citizenship: Iraq
- Education: Iraqi Military Academy
- Profession: Military officer

Military service
- Allegiance: Iraq
- Branch/service: Iraqi Ground Forces
- Years of service: 1996-2020
- Rank: Lieutenant General
- Commands: Iraqi Ground Forces
- Battles/wars: Iran–Iraq war; Iraq War; Gulf War; War in Iraq (2013–2017)

Juma Inad Saadoun (born 1956) is an Iraqi military officer who served as the minister of defense from 2020 to 2022 in the cabinet of prime minister Mustafa Al-Kadhimi. Prior to his appointment, he served as the commander of the Iraqi Ground Forces, where he played a key role in restructuring the army following the campaign against the Islamic State.

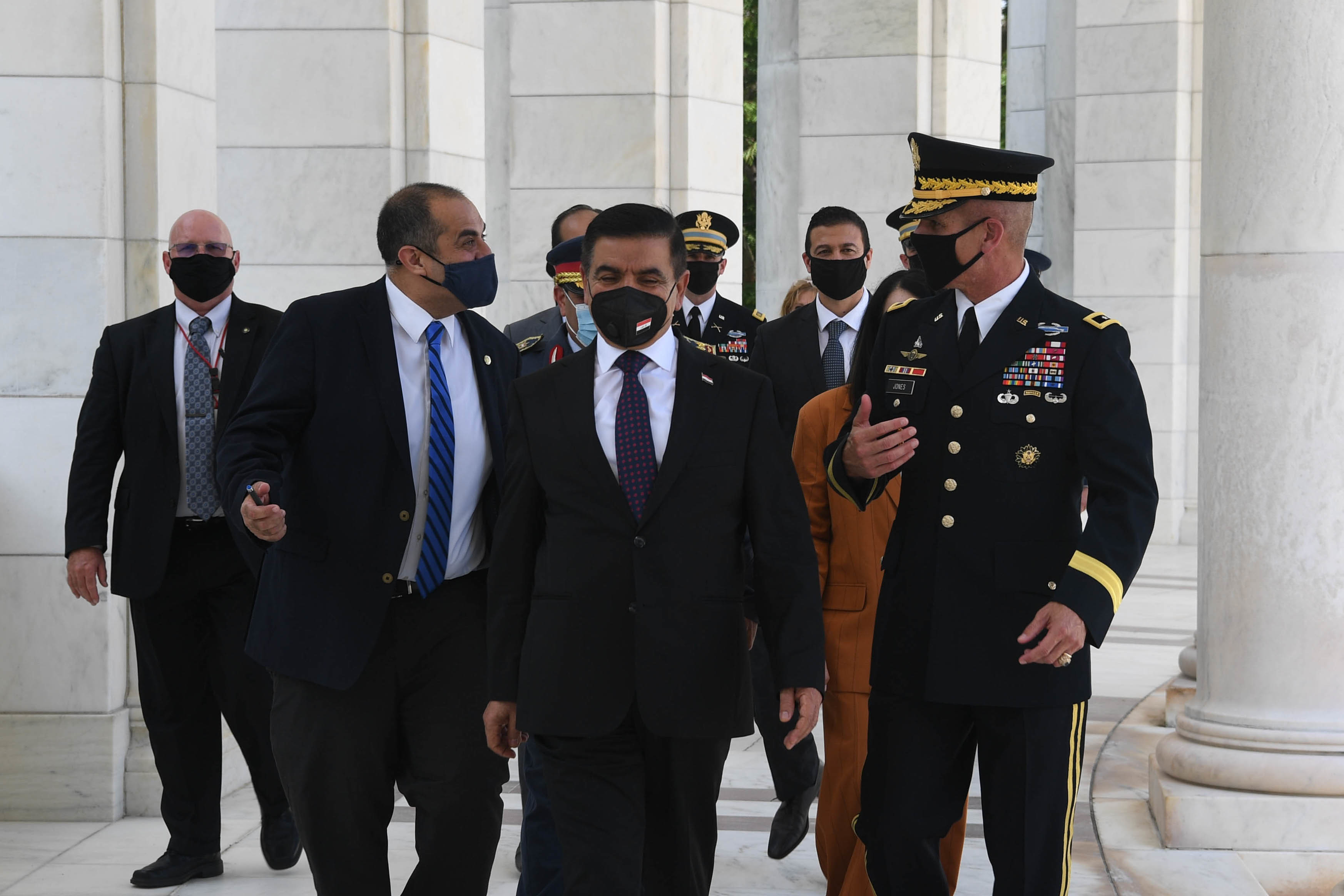
The Minister of Defence of Iraq Juma Inad Saadoun (center) and U.S. Army Brig. Gen. Omar Jones IV, the commander of Joint Force Headquarters-National Capitol Region (right) walk side by side at Arlington National Cemetery, Arlington, Va.

Political offices
Preceded by Najah al-Shammari	Defence Minister of Iraq; 2020-2022	Succeeded by Thabit al-Abassi
