= Thabit al-Abbasi =

Iraqi politician (born 1963)

- ثابت العباسي
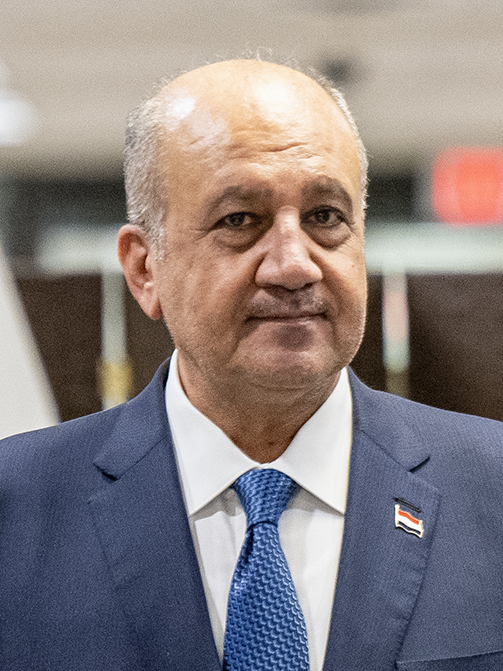

Minister of Defence
- In office 27 October 2022 – 28 January 2026
- Prime Minister: Mohammed Shia' Al Sudani
- Preceded by: Juma Inad
- Succeeded by: Mohammed Shia' al-Sudani (acting)

Personal details
- Born: 1963 (age 62–63) Tal Afar, Nineveh Governorate, Iraq
- Citizenship: Iraqi
- Party: Hasm National Alliance

Military service
- Allegiance: Iraq

Thabit al-Abbasi (Arabic: ثابت العباسي; born 1963 in Tal Afar, Nineveh Governorate) is an Iraqi politician who is serving as the Minister of Defense of Iraq in the government of Mohammed Shia' Al Sudani. He was elected by the Council of Representatives of Iraq on October 27, 2022, as part of the Hasm National Alliance, which he heads.

He holds a Bachelor's degree in military science and is fluent in Arabic, English and Turkish.

Political offices
Preceded by Juma Inad	Defence Minister of Iraq; 2022–2026	Succeeded by Mohammed Shia Al Sudani (acting)
