= Erfan al-Hiyali =

35th Iraqi Minister of Defense

- عرفان الحيالي
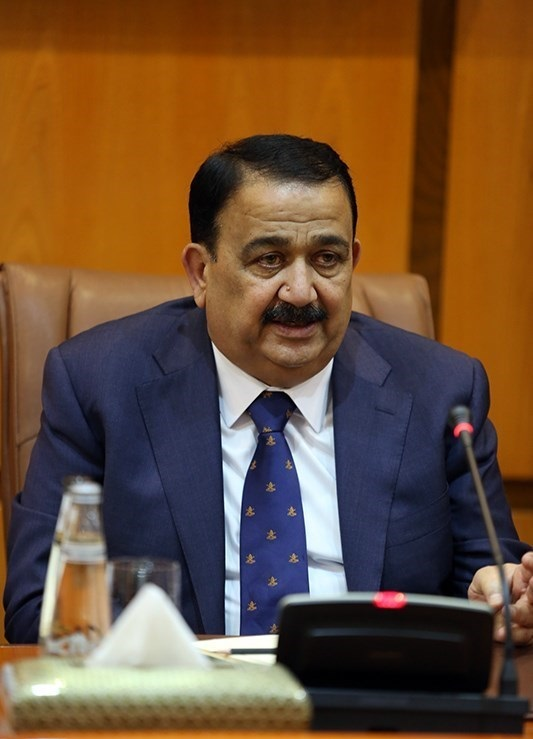

9th Minister of Defence
- In office 30 January 2017 – 24 June 2019
- Prime Minister: Haider al-Abadi; Adil Abdul-Mahdi
- Preceded by: Othman Ghanm (Interim)
- Succeeded by: Najah al-Shammari

Personal details
- Born: 1956 (age 69–70) Al Anbar Governorate, Kingdom of Iraq

Erfan al-Hiyali (Arabic: عرفان الحيالي) was the Defence minister of Iraq, serving in the Cabinet of Haider al-Abadi. The Iraqi parliament voted on al-Hiyali as defense minister on 30 January 2017. He was succeeded by Najah al-Shammari on 24 June 2019. He was also formerly the Commander of Iraqi Central Command.
