= 5th Division (Iraq) =

- Active: 1959–2003; 2005–present
- Country: Republic of Iraq (1959–1968); Ba'athist Iraq (1968–2003); Iraq (2005–present)
- Allegiance: Iraq
- Branch: Iraqi Army
- Type: Motorized infantry
- Size: Division
- Part of: Iraqi Ground Forces Command
- Engagements: Iran–Iraq War; First Battle of Khorramshahr; Operation Tariq al-Qods; Operation Jerusalem; First Battle of al-Faw; Gulf War; Battle of Khafji; Iraq War; Operation Phantom Thunder; Battle of Baqubah

Commanders
- Current commander: Maj. Gen. Shakir Hulail Hussein al-Kaabi

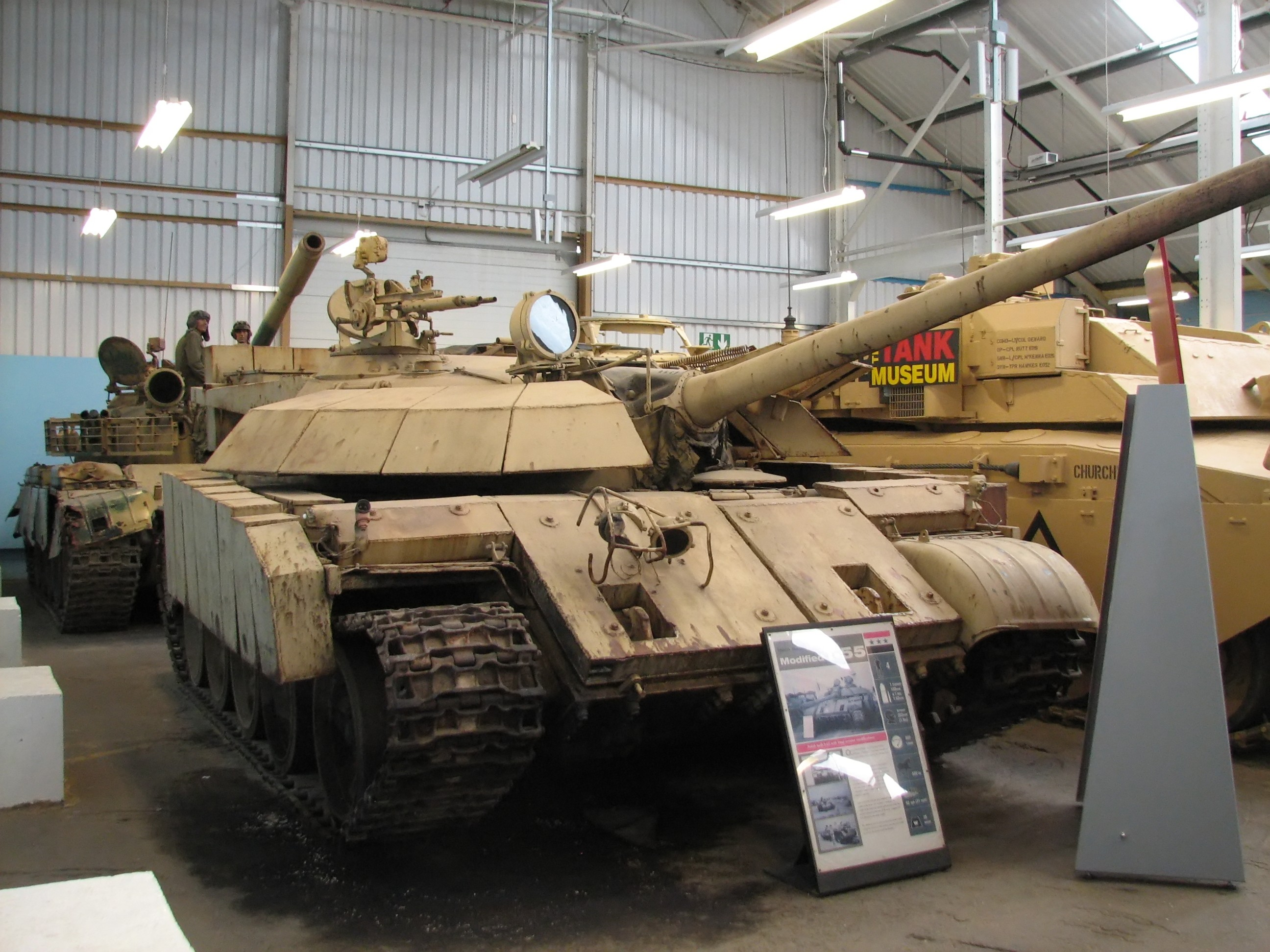
Modified T-55 tank of the 5th Mechanized Division which saw action in the Battle of Khafji

The 5th Division ('Iron Division') is a military formation of the Iraqi Army. The division is currently deployed in eastern Iraq – predominantly Diyala Governorate. Following the losses suffered by the Iraqi Army during fighting in the ISIL campaign in Northern Iraq, the Iraqi security forces became increasingly reliant on pro Iran state militia units – the Popular Mobilization Forces. As of October 2015, Reuters reported that the 5th Division reported to the PMF chain of command, instead of the official military hierarchy.

== History ==
=== Ba'athist Iraq ===
Originally formed in 1959 as a mechanised division, it was part of the 3rd Corps (Iraq) in 1978, located at Basra and comprising the 15th (Basra), 19th (Sibay), and 20th Mechanised Brigades, according to British military attaches' reporting. It would later fight in the Iran–Iraq War, and in the Persian Gulf War (including at the Battle of Khafji). The 3rd Armoured and 5th Mechanised Divisions, the assault force for the Battle of Khafji, had both been retrained in 1986–87 and had participated in many of the 1988 offensives. On the night of 29–30 January 1991, three of four battalion-sized task forces of the 5th Mechanised Division had been turned back by U.S. Marine covering forces, but the fourth moved into Khafji and was later destroyed there. On 30 January 1991 as the division crossed the frontier for the main attack, the 26th Armoured Brigade became trapped in a minefield and had a large amount of damage inflicted on it. The commander of the III Corps, Major General Salah Aboud Mahmoud, called the attack off as he believed it was impossible to execute the full plan.

In 1993, following a coup attempt, Saddam Hussein reportedly abolished all command posts at corps level, with the 5th Division, then reported to be at Mosul, one of the only six divisions to retain a command post. In September 1997 it was reported to be part of the 1st Corps, and be based in the Shuwan area under Staff Major General Sadoun Mahmud Sadoun. At that time it included the 15th, 20th, and 26th Mechanised Brigades. It then disintegrated during the 2003 invasion of Iraq.

=== Post-2003 Iraq ===
The reformed 5th Division's brigade headquarters and battalions were components of the original three division New Iraqi Army.

The House Armed Services Committee reported that: "..the media has reported that the Iraqi Army 5th Division commander, Brigadier General Shakir Al-Kaabi, was suspected of cooperation with the JAM in the arrests of Sunnis, and of being linked to Shi’a death squads. U.S. officers had expressed grave concerns about General Al-Kaabi, and were frustrated in their attempts to have him removed."

The division was certified and assume responsibility for battle space in Diyala Governorate on July 3, 2006. Since the division's reactivation elements have taken part in Operation Phantom Thunder and the Battle of Baqubah in 2007.

In November 2007, "The primary Iraqi Army unit in Diyala Province was organizationally incapable of conducting counter-insurgency operations. The Iraqi 5th Division was in complete disarray following the removal of its commanding general, who had finally been relieved by the Minister of Defense for using his formations for sectarian death squads and Mafia-style criminal enterprises. 5th Division units were essentially combat-ineffective, having been reduced to performing checkpoint operations on 236 static locations across the territory."

Today it is deployed in the difficult region of Diyala is the area between Baghdad and the Iran–Iraq border, an area where some insurgent elements (the Sunnis Baathists Sunni Salafis and Shias of the Mahdi Army supporting Muqtada Al-Sadr, and Al Qaeda) have direct support from Iran and its Special Forces (Quds Force). The regions of Diyala, Salah ad-Din, Kirkuk and south-east of Baghdad are the subject of many operations of the Iraqi Armed Forces and the Coalition, in order to dismantle the networks and interrupt Iranian support.

As of February 2010 the division's dispositions were reported as:

- Division Special Troops Battalion – Galibiyah
- 18th Motorized (AAslt) Brigade – Balad Ruz area of operations
- 19th (Desert Lions) Motorized (AAslt) Brigade (Brigade Special Troops Battalion at Baqubah)
- 20th Motorised Brigade – elements Muqdadiyah
- 21st Motorised Brigade – battalions at Diyala, Samood, Tamuuz
- 5th Field Engineer Regiment – Galibiyah
- 5th Transport and Provisioning Regiment – Kirkush

The Kirkush Military Training Base (KMTB) was one of the first installations constructed for the new Iraqi Army in January 2004.
