= Hazim al-Shaalan =

29th Iraqi Minister of Defense (born 1947)

Minister of Defence
- In office June 2004 – May 2005
- President: Ghazi Mashal Ajil al-Yawer (acting)
- Prime Minister: Ayad Allawi
- Succeeded by: Saadoun al-Dulaimi

Personal details
- Born: Hazim al-Shaalan al-Khuzaei; 1947 (age 78–79) Diwaniyya, Iraq
- Education: University of Baghdad

Hazim al-Shaalan al-Khuzaei (born 1947) is an Iraqi politician who served as the minister of defence from June 2004 until May 2005 under the Iraqi Interim Government of Ayad Allawi.

al-Shaalan was born in Diwaniyya, southern Iraq, into a leading family of the Ghazal tribe. He is a Shia Arab. He graduated from the University of Baghdad with a degree in economics and was an inspector general of the Iraqi Real Estate Bank from 1983 until he left Iraq in 1985. He managed a real estate firm in London until the Gulf War in 1990, after which he returned to Iraq. An Iranian news agency reported documents showing that al-Shaalan had been a member of Saddam Hussein's secret police, the Mukhabarat.

He was Iraq's defence minister from June 2004 until May 2005 under the Iraqi Interim Government of Ayad Allawi. He appointed Ziyad Cattan, as the Defence Ministry's procurement chief, who has since fallen under suspicion of involvement in the greatest theft in history: embezzling $US1 billion intended for weapons purchase. Al-Shaalan had received an exemption from the cabinet for having his ministry's expenditures overseen by the cabinet's audit committee. Al-Shaalan claimed that the Coalition Provisional Authority's interim administrator of Iraq, Paul Bremer, had signed off the appointment of Cattan, but Bremer claims he had never heard of Cattan.

In August 2004 he said Iran was hostile to Iraq's government. However this was odd considering many claim that he was close to Iran.

Ali Allawi, the finance minister in the Iraqi Transitional Government, accused al-Shaalan of embezzlement in 2005, and Iraq's anti-corruption watchdog, the Commission for Public Integrity, sought to bar him from running in the following parliamentary elections. Shaalan and Cattan left Iraq in 2005 for Jordan.

In May 2007 al-Shaalan was convicted in absentia of embezzlement and sentenced to 7 years' imprisonment. An investigation by the BBC in 2008 claimed he was using a private jet to fly around the world and still owns commercial properties near Marble Arch in London. The January 2012 report from the US Special Inspector General for Iraq Reconstruction said that the crimes were covered by Amnesty legislation passed by the Council of Representatives of Iraq in 2008 and that Shaalan was "living comfortably abroad".
