= Ministry of Defence (Iraq) =

Government ministry of Iraq

Republic of Iraq Ministry of Defence
- وزارة الدفاع

Department overview
- Formed: 1921; 105 years ago
- Jurisdiction: Government of Iraq
- Headquarters: Green Zone, Baghdad
- Annual budget: $21.1 Billion (2024)
- Minister responsible: Nayif al-Shammari
- Website: www.mod.mil.iq(in Arabic)

The Ministry of Defence (Arabic: وزارة الدفاع العراقية) is a central government ministry of Iraq responsible for national defence. It is also involved with internal security.

== Authority ==
The Ministry directs all the Iraqi Armed Forces, comprising a Joint Headquarters, the Iraqi Ground Forces Command (which controls the Army), the Iraqi Special Operations Forces, the Iraqi Army, the Iraqi Navy (including Marines), and the Iraqi Air Force.

== History ==
The Ministry was dissolved by Coalition Provisional Authority Order Number 2 of mid-2003. It was formally re-established by CPA Order 67 of 21 March 2004. In the interim period, the CPA Office of Security Affairs served as the de facto Ministry of Defence.

The Iraqi Counter Terrorism Bureau directs the Iraqi Counter Terrorism Command, which is a further military force answerable to the Prime Minister of Iraq directly. As of 30 June 2009, there had been legislation in progress for a year to make the Iraqi Counter Terrorism Bureau a separate ministry.

== Minister of defence ==
The position of Minister of Defence became vacant in the previous Iraqi cabinet, approved on 21 December 2010. While it was vacant, Prime Minister Nouri al-Maliki served as the acting defence minister. Saadoun al-Dulaimi later served as Minister of Defence from 2011 to 2014. Khaled al-Obaidi served as defence minister in the Iraqi cabinet of Prime Minister Haider al-Abadi. Juma Inad served as defence minister from May 2020 to October of 2022 under the caretaker government of Mustafa al-Kadhimi. Thabit al-Abassi serves as the current minister of defence as of 2022.

The previous Minister of Defence, Lieutenant General Abd al-Qadr Muhammed Jassim al-Obaidi, is a Sunni career military officer and political independent. He had limited experience and faced a number of hurdles impeding his effective governance. Some of the major problems included inheriting a staff that is notorious for favouritism, corruption, and deeply divided along sectarian and ethnic lines. He was a rival of the former Minister of the Interior Jawad al-Bolani, National Security Advisor Muwafaq al-Rubai, and Minister of Staff for National Security Affairs Shirwan al-Waili. He has been criticized for not being able to stand up to the Badr Organization and Mehdi Army members which dominate his own party. In addition, as a Sunni he faced inherent challenges working within a Shiite-dominated government.

On 19 September 2005, The Independent reported that approximately one billion US dollars have been stolen by top ranking officials from the Ministry of Defence including Hazim al-Shaalan and Ziyad Cattan.

Previous defence ministers under Saddam Hussein's regime included Ali Hassan al-Majid ('Chemical Ali'). Iraq's first minister of defence was Jafar al-Askari (1920–1922).

== List of ministers of defence ==
=== Kingdom of Iraq (1921–1958) ===
Name	Portrait	Term of office		Political party	Prime Minister
Jafar al-Askari		23 October 1920	16 November 1922		Abd Al-Rahman Al-Gillani
Nuri as-Said		20 November 1922	2 August 1924		
Yasin al-Hashimi		2 August 1924	2 June 1925		
Nuri as-Said		26 June 1925	8 January 1928		
Abd al-Muhsin as-Sa'dun		14 January 1928	20 January 1929		
Muhammad Amin Zaki		28 April 1929	25 August 1929		
Nuri al-Sa’id		19 September 1929	19 March 1930		
Jafar al-Askari		23 March 1930	27 October 1932		
Rashid al-Khawja		3 November 1932	18 March 1933		
Jalal Baban		20 March 1933	28 October 1933		

=== Iraqi Republic (1958–1968) ===
Name	Portrait	Term of office		Political party	President
Abd al-Karim Qasim		14 July 1958	8 February 1963	Independent	Muhammad Najib ar-Ruba'i
Salah Mahdi Ammash		8 February 1963	10 November 1963	Ba'ath Party (Iraq Region)	Abdul Salam Arif
Hardan al-Tikriti		10 November 1963	2 March 1964		Abdul Salam Arif
Tahir Yahya		2 March 1964	3 September 1965	Arab Socialist Union	Abdul Salam Arif
Arif Abd ar-Razzaq		6 September 1965	16 September 1965	Arab Socialist Union	Abdul Salam Arif
Abd al-'Aziz al-'Uqaili		21 September 1965	18 April 1966		Abdul Salam Arif
Shakir Mahmud Shukri		18 April 1966	17 July 1968		Abdul Rahman Arif

=== Ba'athist Iraq (1968–2003) ===
Name	Portrait	Term of office		Political party	President
Ibrahim Abdel Rahman Dawoud		17 July 1968	30 July 1968	Independent	Ahmed Hassan al-Bakr
Hardan al-Tikriti		30 July 1968	April 1970	Iraqi Ba'ath Party (Iraq Region)	Ahmed Hassan al-Bakr
Hammad Shihab		April 1970	30 June 1973	Iraqi Ba'ath Party (Iraq Region)	Ahmed Hassan al-Bakr
Abdullah al-Khadduri (acting)		30 June 1973	11 November 1974	Iraqi Ba'ath Party (Iraq Region)	Ahmed Hassan al-Bakr
Ahmed Hassan al-Bakr		11 November 1974	15 October 1977	Iraqi Ba'ath Party (Iraq Region)	Ahmed Hassan al-Bakr
Adnan Khairallah		15 October 1977	4 May 1989	Iraqi Ba'ath Party (Iraq Region)	Saddam Hussein
Abdul Jabbar Shanshal		4 May 1989	December 1990	Iraqi Ba'ath Party (Iraq Region)	Saddam Hussein
Saadi Toma		12 December 1990	6 April 1991	Iraqi Ba'ath Party (Iraq Region)	Saddam Hussein
Ali Hassan al-Majid		1991	1995	Iraqi Ba'ath Party (Iraq Region)	Saddam Hussein
Sultan Hashim		1995	2003	Iraqi Ba'ath Party (Iraq Region)	Saddam Hussein

=== Republic of Iraq (2004–present) ===
Name		Portrait	Term of office		Political party	Prime Minister
1	Ali Allawi		April 2004	June 2004	Independent	Ayad Allawi
2	Hazim al-Shaalan		June 2004	1 June 2005	Iraqi National Congress	Ayad Allawi
3	Saadoun al-Dulaimi		1 June 2005	6 March 2006	Independent	Ibrahim al-Jaafari
4	Abdul Qadir Obeidi		6 March 2006	21 December 2010	Independent	Nouri al-Maliki
5	Nouri al-Maliki		21 December 2010	17 August 2011	State of Law Coalition	Nouri al-Maliki
6	Saadoun al-Dulaimi		17 August 2011	18 October 2014	Unity Alliance of Iraq	Nouri al-Maliki
7	Khaled al-Obaidi		18 October 2014	19 August 2016	Unity Alliance of Iraq	Haider al-Abadi
8	Othman al-Ghanmi (interim)		19 August 2016	30 January 2017	State of Law Coalition	Haider al-Abadi
9	Erfan al-Hiyali		30 January 2017	24 June 2019	State of Law Coalition	Haider al-Abadi
10	Najah al-Shammari		24 June 2019	6 May 2020	al-Wataniya	Adil Abdul-Mahdi
11	Juma Inad		6 May 2020	27 October 2022	Independent	Mustafa Al-Kadhimi
12	Thabit al-Abbasi		27 October 2022	28 January 2026	National Resolve Alliance	Mohammed Shia' Al Sudani
—	Mohammed Shia' Al Sudani		28 January 2026	14 May 2026	Furatayn Movement	Himself
13	Nayif al-Shammari		15 October 2026		National Resolve Alliance	Ali al-Zaidi
