= Paul Westermeyer =

American military historian

- Education: Ohio State University
- Occupations: Author and historian
- Writing career
- Subjects: Military history, US Marine history, Medieval history

Paul W. Westermeyer is a public historian and the 2015 recipient of "The Brigadier General Edwin Simmons-Henry I. Shaw Award" for his book Liberating Kuwait: U.S. Marines in the Gulf War, 1990–1991.

== Education ==
Westermeyer received both his bachelor's (in history) and master's degrees (in military history) from Ohio State University.

== Career ==
He began his career teaching history at Ohio State University and Columbus State Community College. In 2005, Westermeyer became a historian for the Marine Corps History Division, where he began publishing books.

=== Awards ===
In 2015, Westermeyer was awarded The Brigadier General Edwin Simmons–Henry I. Shaw Award for superior historical scholarship, a prize presented by the Marine Corps Heritage Foundation.

== Bibliography ==
=== Books ===
- HackJammer: HackMaster Adventures in Space
- U.S. Marines in Battle: Al-Khafji, January 28 - February 1, 1991
- Liberating Kuwait: U.S. Marines in the Gulf War, 1990-1991
- Desert Voices: An Oral History Anthology of Marines in the Gulf War, 1990-1991
- U.S. Marines in Afghanistan, 2010-2014: Anthology and Annotated Bibliography
- The Legacy of Belleau Wood: 100 years of making Marines and winning battles, an anthology
- The Legacy of American Naval Power: Reinvigorating Maritime Strategic Thought
- The United States Marine Corps: The Expeditionary Force at War

=== Magazine Articles ===
- Shattered Amphibious Dreams: The Decision Not to Make an Amphibious Landing during Operation Desert Storm
- Every Marine a Flag Raiser: The Legacy and Meaning of the Iwo Jima Flag Raisings
- Historiography for Marines: How Marines should read and understand histories

=== Presentations ===
- Mountain Storm: Counter-insurgency and the Marine Air-Ground Task Force

== See also ==
- United States Marine Corps History Division
