= 1st Division (Iraq) =

- Official division logo
- Active: 1941–2003; 2005–present
- Country: Kingdom of Iraq (1941–58); Republic of Iraq (1958–68); Ba'athist Iraq (1968–2003); Iraq (2005–present)
- Branch: Iraqi Ground Forces
- Type: Motorised infantry
- Size: Division
- Part of: Anbar Operations Command
- Garrison/HQ: Camp Fallujah
- Engagements: Anglo-Iraqi War; Iran–Iraq War; Operation Fath ol-Mobin; Second Battle of Al Faw; Gulf War; Battle of Khafji; Iraq War; Second Battle of Fallujah; Battle of Basra (2008); War in Iraq (2013-17); Northern Iraq offensive; Battle of Mosul

Insignia
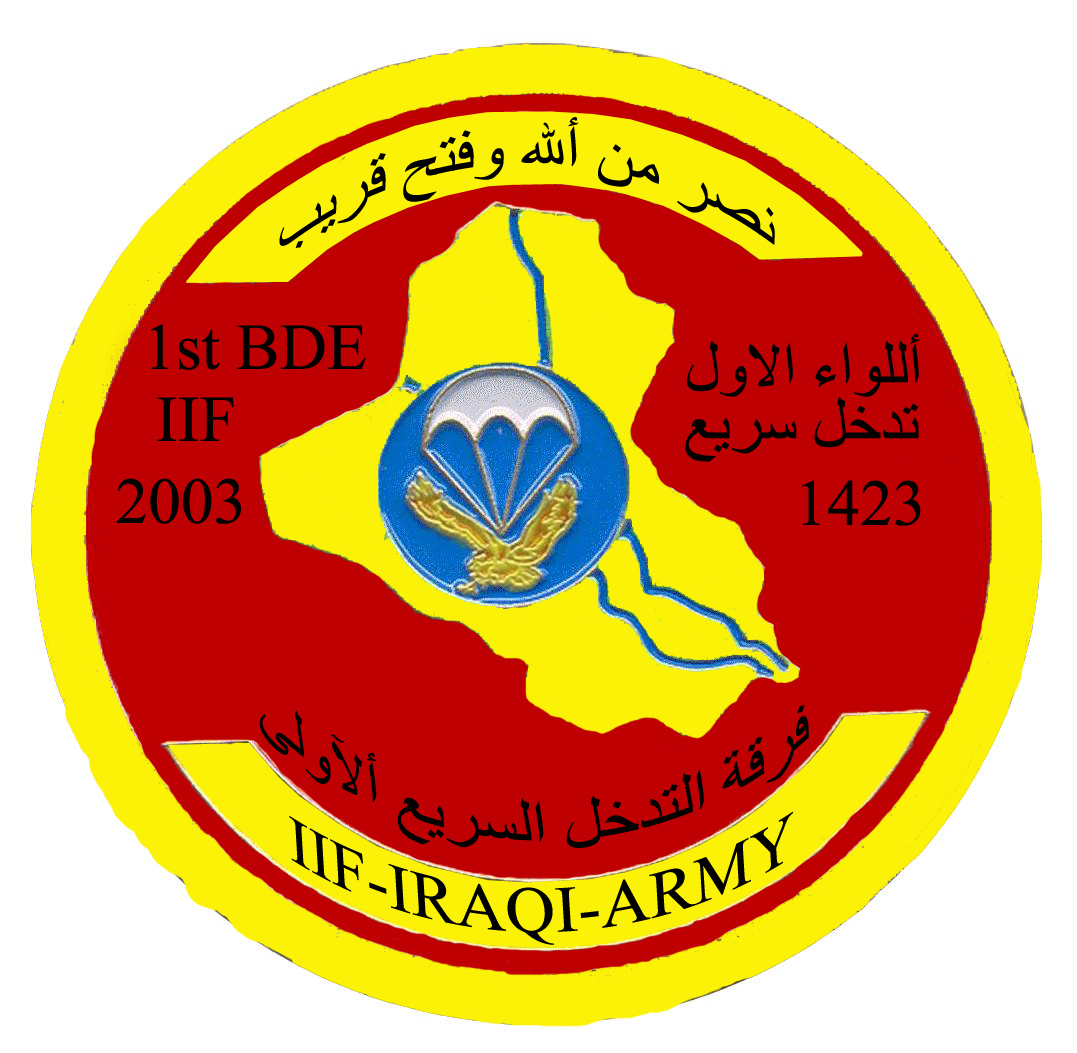
- 1st Brigade SSI

- Division Flag

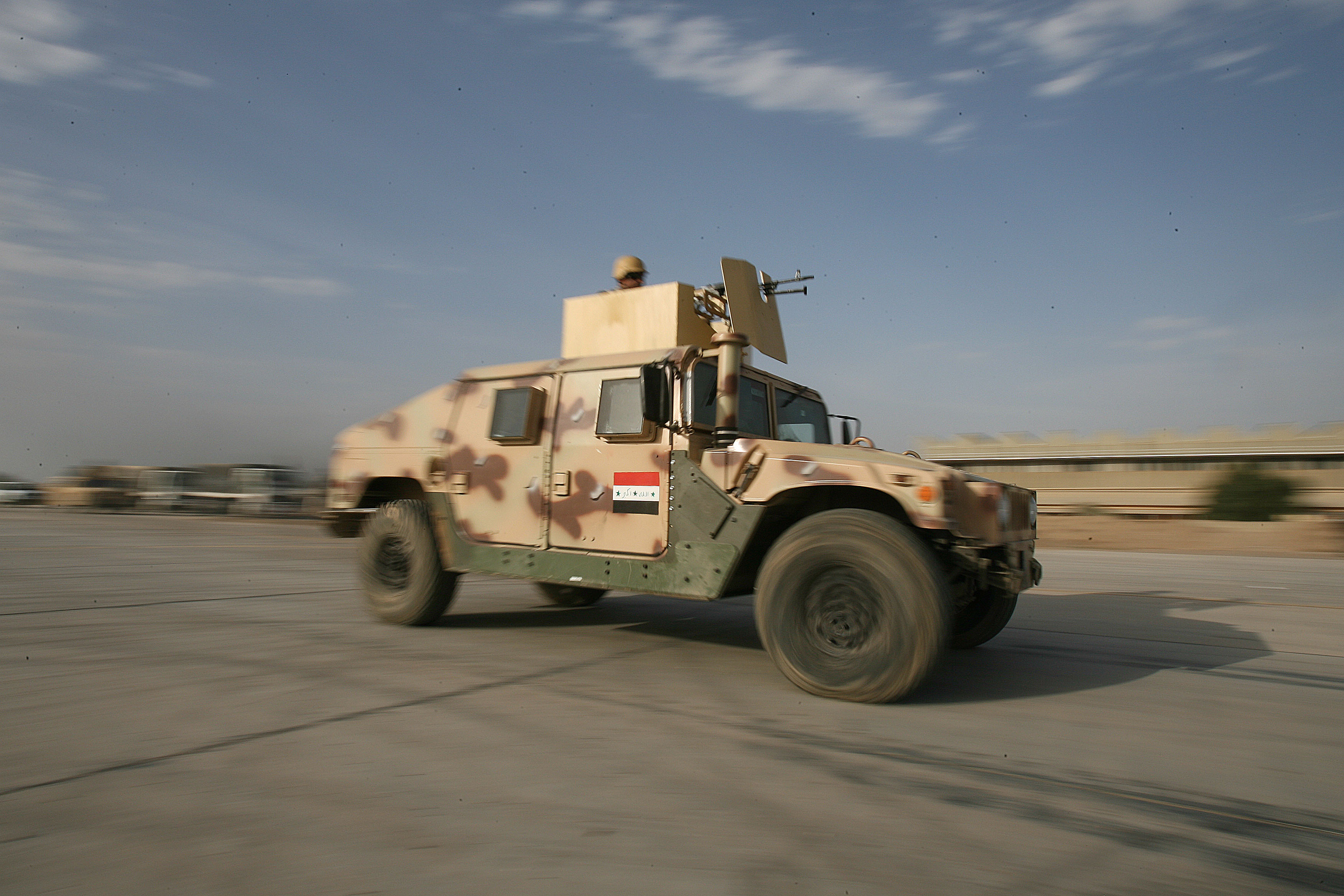
The 2nd Brigade, 1st Iraqi Division took delivery of 10 armored HMMWVs in March 2006

The 1st Division (IFF) is a motorized infantry division of the Iraqi Ground Forces headquartered in Camp Fallujah.

The division, along with much of the Iraqi Ground Forces, is equipped with American supplied weapons, equipment, and vehicles. The division suffered heavy casualties in the fight against the Islamic State during the 2013–2017 War but has regained its strength in the last few years.

== History ==
Originally the 1st Division was one of the four initial divisions of the Iraqi Ground Forces, active by 1941. It later became the 1st Mechanised Division, and in 1978, according to reports from the British Military Attache in Baghdad, formed part of the 3rd Corps, and was headquartered at Diwaniya, with the 1st (Diwaniya), 34th (Nasirya) and 27th Brigades (Kut). It fought in the Iran–Iraq War, including Operation Fath ol-Mobin, in which the division suffered heavy losses, and at the Second Battle of Al Faw. It was in Kuwait during the 1991 Gulf War, fought during the Battle of Khafji, and was active during the 1990s. At the beginning of the 2003 invasion of Iraq it was part of the 5th Corps in the Mosul area, being made up of the 1st and 27th Mechanised Brigades, and the 34th Armoured Brigade. It was disbanded with the rest of the Iraqi Ground Forces in May 2003 by Coalition Provisional Authority Order 2.

The division was reformed c. 2005–2007 with the rest of the Iraqi Ground Forces. The 1st Division was originally formed from the battalions of the Iraqi Intervention Force (IIF).

Prime Minister Ayad Allawi of Iraq's interim government announced organizational changes for the country's security forces, along with a plan for taking on Iraq's enemies, at a 20 June 2004 Baghdad news conference. Allawi envisions the Iraqi rapid intervention forces thwarting sabotage elements, "especially those who chose to hide behind innocent Iraqis in our cities and villages."

As a first order by Iraq's new Ministry of Defense, the all-Iraqi Intervention Forces began patrolling the streets of Baghdad on June 28, 2004.

Two battalions of the IIF conducted operations in Najaf between September and December 2004. Those same two battalions plus another IIF battalion, together with other Iraqi units, were present during the Second Battle of Fallujah soon afterwards. The first significant troop increase for the IIF in 2005 was the graduation of 670 soldiers from the Taji military training base on January 18, 2005. The State Department claimed the IIF had 9,159 men assigned as of the Iraq Weekly Status Report for January 12, 2005.

By January 2005, the IIF comprised twelve of the army’s 27 battalions and was integrated as the 1st Division.

According to Major Gary Schreckengost, a MiTT from the 1st Division's 4th Brigade, 2005–06: "The 1st Brigade (original IIF) was considered the 'elite' of the Iraqi Ground Forces and as such, was deployed around the country much like a fire brigade. From 2005–06, most of its battalions were deployed in and around Ramadi or out on the Syrian border. The 3rd brigade was posted at Habbaniya and the 2nd and 4th brigades were posted in or around Fallujah. The 4th Brigade was a motorized brigade and mostly held the area east of Fallujah out to Abu Gharib."

The division was transferred to the Iraqi Ground Forces Command on February 15, 2007. The February 2007 release said the Division was headquartered in Habbaniyah, Al Anbar and operates from Baghdad to Ramadi. All four brigades of the division were operational when the division was transferred to the IGFC's control. In 2008 a brigade of the division took part in the Battle of Basra (2008), which was officially designated 'Operation Charge of the Knights.' As of September 2008, the division was commanded by Brigadier General Adel Abbas.

The 4th Brigade of the division had formerly partnered with 34th Peshmerga Brigade and the 1st Squadron, 14th Cavalry Regiment, U.S. Army, since April 2009. The division had brigades in Mosul and north Diyala as of January 2010.

=== Fight against ISIS ===
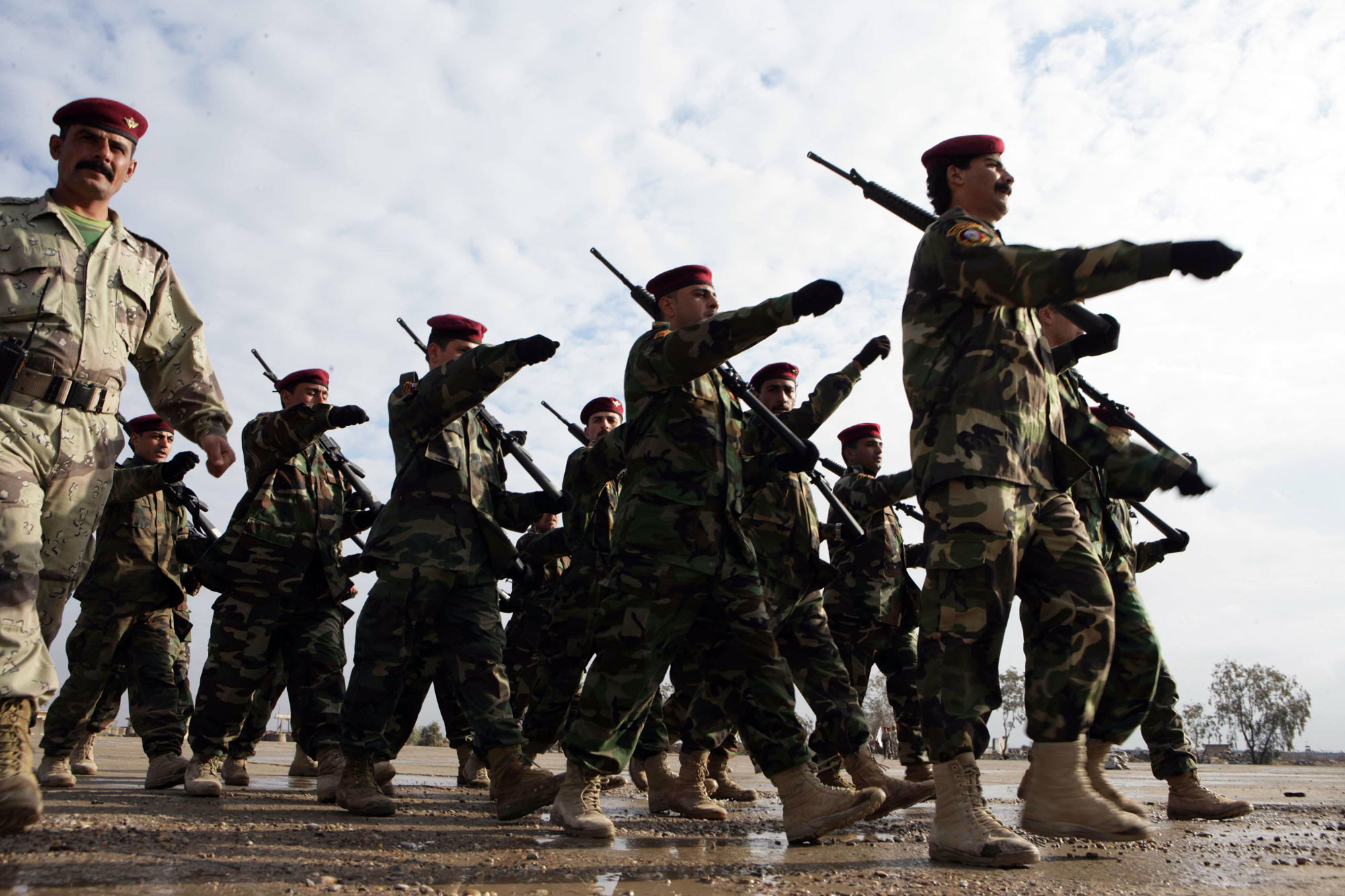
Iraqi Soldiers with 2nd Regiment, 2nd Brigade, 1st Division, practice marching for their graduation ceremony at a training center in Al Anbar, February 15, 2008

In June 2014, the Islamic State of Iraq and Syria (ISIS) militants attacked parts of northern Iraq. In the process, it was reported that two brigades of the 1st Division were lost during the attack. Mitchell Prothero of the McClatchy Foreign Staff reported July 14, 2014 that "the 1st Division also is basically gone, losing two brigades in Anbar province earlier in the year, then two more during last month's Islamic State onslaught, including one brigade that in the words of [a] senior Iraqi politician was "decimated" in Diyala province northeast of Baghdad."

Another report says that the 4th Brigade was destroyed in June 2014. but the brigade was also listed with 10th Division at Dawilibah, south of Baghdad, in October 2014.

The division is now part of the Anbar Operations Command alongside the 7th Division.

== Composition ==
As of January 2010 the division's dispositions appear to be:

HQ Camp Fallujah

1st Motorized (AAslt) Brigade – HQ (Brigade Special Troops Battalion), Camp Ali, Ramadi. One battalion at Lake Tharthar

2nd Motorized Brigade – currently battalions at Taji, Fallujah, and Hylateen (Diyala)

3rd Motorized Brigade – Previously temporarily assigned to 5th Division in Diyala, located in Mosul as of December 2016.

1st Field Engineer Regiment – Habbenayah

1st Transportation and Provisioning Regiment – Habbenayah

== Notes ==
- Anthony Cordesman, Iraq's Military Capabilities in 2002: A Dynamic Net Assessment, CSIS, Washington DC, 2002.
- Dury-Agri, Jessa Rose; Kassim, Omer; Martin, Patrick (2017-11-01). "Iraqi Security Forces and Popular Mobilization Forces: Order of Battle". Institute for the Study of War. Washington DC..
- Fontenot, Gregory; Degen, E. J.; Tohn, David (2004). On Point: The United States Army in Operation Iraqi Freedom. Naval Institute Press. pp. 222–232. ISBN 978-1-59114-279-9. Archived from the original on 18 September 2015.
- Robinson, Linda (2005). "Chapter 13: Viking Hammer (and the Ugly Baby)". Masters of Chaos: The Secret History of the Special Forces. PublicAffairs. pp. 296 et seq. ISBN 978-1-58648-352-4.
