= 3rd Corps (Iraq) =

The 3rd Corps was a corps of the Iraqi Army, established before 1978. It fought in the Iran–Iraq War; the Gulf War; and the 2003 US invasion of Iraq.

== Iran–Iraq War ==
In 1978 the corps was reported to be headquartered at Nasariyah and to consist of 1st and 5th Mechanised Divisions and 9th Armoured Division.

Major General (ret) Aladdin Hussein Makki Khamas, former corps chief of staff 1981–1984, said to U.S. interviewers decades later:

When the Iranians launched major attacks in May/June 1982, the III Corps was unprepared, so a decision was made to withdraw. Before the decision to withdraw, the Iranians attacked the corps' southern sector. This left two divisions, the 5th Mechanized and 6th Armored, defending the corps' northern sector, but not under any pressure. These two divisions remained in the north away from the fighting. The right decision at the time would have been to use these divisions to attack and outflank the enemy attacking our forces in the south, thus catching them in the rear. If the III Corps had done that, the Iranian attack would have failed. Because of the rigid, old-school thinking that dominated the army at the time, no one believed such an offensive would work except for me and my colleague Mekkeh Mudad. General Shanshal was visiting the corps headquarters and he was surrounded by members of the military bureau of the Baath Party. General al-Qadhi, the corps commander, looked upon General Shanshal as his father. General al-Qadhi asked him, 'What do you suggest I do with these two divisions? Shall I pull them back or attack with them?' General Shanshal replied, 'I don't know. You are the corps commander; you decide. I don't know.' My heart sank. A corps commander asking his superior what to do and this was the response! Poor General al-Qadhi knew they wanted him to withdraw.

== 2003 invasion of Iraq, dissolution ==
In 2003, the 3rd Corps headquarters was located at Nasiriyah, and it was composed of the 11th Infantry Division, 51st Mechanised Infantry Division (reported in 2002 as comprising the 31st Mech Bde; 32nd Mech Bde; and 41st Armoured Brigade), and 6th Armored Division—all at around 50 percent strength. The 51st operated south covering the oilfields, and the 6th was north near Al Amarah, which left three brigade-sized elements of the 11th ID to guard the An Nasiriyah area.

The corps was dissolved alongside the remainder of the Iraqi Army by Coalition Provisional Authority Order 2 of May 2003.
