= Ziyad Cattan =

Iraqi politician

- Known for: accused of stealing 1 billion US dollars of Iraqi government funds, during the US occupation.

Ziyad Cattan is a former Iraqi politician accused of stealing 1 billion US dollars of Iraqi government funds, during the US occupation. According to an article published in The Independent, Hazim al-Shaalan, the Defence Minister of Iyad Allawi's interim administration, appointed Ziyad Cattan as the Defence Ministry's procurement chief. The Los Angeles Times reported that Cattan had been appointed by Iraq's American occupiers.

The Independent article describes massive fraud in the Defence Ministry's procurement, which it describes as "the greatest theft in history", which occurred under Cattan's watch. Of expenditures of between $US1 and 2 billion, the article estimates only $US200 million worth of usable equipment was purchased.

In September 2005 The Independent reported that Cattan and his former boss Al-Shaalan, are both living in Jordan, and refusing comment. By November 2005 he had returned to Poland, and agreed to be interviewed by the Los Angeles Times.

In August 2007 The Guardian reported that Amnesty International and British Members of Parliament were pressing the UK Government for an explanation over Cattan's involvement with a British arms-dealing firm. The UK firm had a licence to import 40,000 surplus AK-47s from Yugoslavia, but had sent Yugoslavian weapons to Cattan, for Iraq. International regulations, to control the distribution of weapons, requires certification to confirm buyers were the end-users, and would not resell the weapons they received. The Guardian reported that the lack of compliant documentation meant that weapons sold to Cattan were now untraceable, and thus a breach of international arms agreements. He has dual citizen of Poland and Iraq. He earned a PhD in Economics. During the twenty years he lived in Poland Cattan operated both a used car and a pizza companies.
