= Iraqi Ground Forces Command =

Iraqi Ground Forces Command Iraqi Joint Forces Command
- Active: 2004–present
- Country: Iraq
- Type: Formation (military)
- Part of: Iraqi Army
- Garrison/HQ: Victory Base Complex

Commanders
- Current commander: Lieutenant General Qassim Muhammad Salih
- Notable commanders: Lt. Gen. Abdul Qadir Obeidi

Insignia
- Ground Forces flag

The Ground Forces Command at Victory Base Complex near Baghdad Airport was the most important fighting formation in the Iraqi Army. The headquarters of the Iraqi Ground Forces Command and the Iraqi Joint Forces Command are the same entity.

Since 2006, and probably up to U.S. withdrawal in 2011, the Ground Forces Command has supervised the bulk of the military units of the army.

== History ==
From 2003 until 2006, the units of the reforming Iraqi Army were under U.S. Army operational control. Their formation had been managed by the Coalition Military Assistance Training Team, which then became part of Multi-National Security Transition Command – Iraq. After they became operational, they had been transferred to the operational control of Multi-National Corps Iraq or one of its subordinate formations.

On May 3, 2006 a significant command and control development took place. The Iraqi Army command and control center opened in a ceremony at the IFGC headquarters at Camp Victory. The IGFC was established to exercise command and control of assigned Iraqi Army forces and, upon assuming Operational Control, to plan and direct operations to defeat the Iraqi insurgency. At the time, the IFGC was commanded by Lt. Gen. Abdul-Qadar. The JHQ-AST (Joint Headquarters Advisory Support Team) had been established in 2004 to guide the IGFC/IJFHQ through this process. The JHQ-AST was part of MNSTC-I. The Advisory Support Team's mission was described as to 'mentor and assist the Iraqi Joint Headquarters in order to become capable of exercising effective national command and control of the Iraqi Armed Forces, contributing to the capability development process, and contributing to improving the internal security situation within Iraq in partnership with coalition forces.'

In 2006 the ten planned divisions began to be certified and assume battlespace responsibility: the 6th and 8th before June 26, 2006, the 9th on June 26, 2006, the 5th on July 3, 2006, the 4th on August 8, 2006, and the 2nd on December 21, 2006.

After divisions were certified, they began to be transferred from U.S. operational control to Iraqi control of the IGFC. On 7 September 2006, Prime Minister Nouri al-Maliki signed a document taking control of Iraq's small naval and air forces and the 8th Division of the Iraqi Army, based in the south.

At a ceremony marking the occasion, General George W. Casey Jr., Commander Multi-National Force Iraq (MNF-I), stated "From today.. the Iraqi military responsibilities will be increasingly conceived and led by Iraqis." Previously, MNF-I, commanded by Casey, gave orders to the Iraqi armed forces through a joint American-Iraqi headquarters and chain of command. Senior U.S. and coalition officers controlled army divisions but smaller units were commanded by Iraqi officers. After the handover, the chain flowed from the prime minister in his role as Iraqi commander in chief, through his Defense Ministry to an Iraqi military headquarters, the Iraqi Joint Forces Command. From there, the orders went to Iraqi units on the ground. The other nine Iraqi divisions remained under U.S. command, with authority gradually being transferred.

U.S. Army officials said there was no specific timetable for the transition. U.S. military spokesman Major General William Caldwell said it would be up to Prime Minister al-Maliki to decide "how rapidly he wants to move along with assuming control. ... They can move as rapidly thereafter as they want. I know, conceptually, they've talked about perhaps two divisions a month."

After the 8th Division's transfer on September 7, 2006, the 3rd Division was transferred on December 1, 2006. Another unspecified division also was transferred to IGFC control.

Also transferred to the Iraqi chain of command were smaller logistics units: on November 1, 2006, the 5th Motor Transport Regiment (MTR) was the fifth of nine MTRs to be transferred to the Iraqi Army divisions. 2007 plans included, MNF-I said, great efforts to make the Iraqi Army able to sustain itself logistically.

Transfers of divisions to IGFC control continued in 2007: the 1st Division on February 15, the 10th Division on February 23, and the 7th Division on November 1. The new 14th Division also held its opening ceremony in Basrah on November 14, 2007.

Ministerial Order #151, dated 19 February 2008, directed that the brigades of all the divisions be renumbered sequentially. Instead of each division have 1st/2nd/3rd/4th Brigades, each brigade has a unique identifying number.

From late 2008, United States personnel were worried by Prime Minister Maliki's "attempt to exert control over the Iraqi Army and police by proliferating regional operations commands. Using the Baghdad Operations Command as his precedent, Maliki created other regional commands in Basrah, Diyala, the mid-Euphrates region, and Ninawa, and others would follow. Initially coalition leaders welcomed the idea of regional commands that could create unity of Iraqi effort, but their enthusiasm faded as Maliki began to use the new headquarters to bypass the formal chain of command," which came to resemble the operating mode of the Saddam Hussein regime.

Following the withdrawal of United States forces from Iraq in December 2011, the Iraqi Ground Forces Command continued to oversee the Iraqi Army as part of the Ministry of Defence's command structure. The broader military command system remained largely based on the structure established during the Coalition period, although the government increasingly centralized military decision-making under the Prime Minister's Office.

== Staff organisation ==
- M1: administration, personnel
- M2: military intelligence, arms control, weather and military geography
- M3: leadership, planning, operations, training and exercise planning for the Army
- M4: Logistical Tasks / Materials Management / Maintenance
- M5: Civil-Military Cooperation (CIMIC / CIMIC)
- M6: Communications / IT / Management Service – Staff Maj. Gen. Saad, Iraqi Joint Headquarters M6

== Forces under Command ==
The IGFC does not control all the fighting formations of the Iraqi Army. The Baghdad Operational Command reports separately to the National Operations Center. "The 9th (Mechanized) Division has the entire army armoured (tank) capability. It is ethnically diverse. Some of the battalions of the 10th Division are manned by Shi’a militia."

It was reported in January 2010 that the Operational Commands were to be the basis for future Iraqi Army corps.

Iraqi Ground Force Command (IGFC)

- Ninewa Operational Command – Mosul; established December 2007 under Lieutenant General Riyadh Jalal Tawfiq, who had commanded the 9th Division in Baghdad.
  - 2nd Division – Mosul +
    - 5 (Citadel) Motorized Bde
    - 6 (Scorpions) Infantry (AAslt) Bde
    - 7 Infantry Bde
    - 8 Infantry Bde
    - 2nd Motor Transport Regiment
  - 3rd Motorised Division – Al-Kasik +
- Diyala Operational Command – Sulamaniyah, Diyala, Kirkuk, Salahadin
  - 4th Motorised Division – Tikrit – certified and assumed responsibility for most of Salah ad Din Governorate and At-Ta'mim Governorate provinces, including the major cities Samarra and Tikrit, on August 8, 2006. The 4th Division's battalions are former ING units, recruited locally. It is ethnically diverse and has operational control of a number of Strategic Infrastructure Battalions protecting oil pipelines.
    - 14th Motorised (AAslt) Bde (1-4),
    - 15th (Eagles) Motorised Bde (2-4),
    - 16th Infantry Bde (3-4),
    - 4 Bde (Samara brigade) (forming; 17th Bde planned for summer 2008?)
    - 4th Motor Transport Regiment
  - 5th Infantry Division (Iron) – Diyala Governorate – Division is certified and assumed responsibility for the battle space on July 3, 2006. The 5th Division’s brigade headquarters, and battalions were components of the NIA.
    - 18th Infantry (AAslt) Bde (1-5)
    - 19th (Desert Lions) Infantry (AAslt) Bde (former 2-5)
    - 20th Motorised Bde (former 3-5)
    - 21st Motorised Bde (former 4-5)
    - 5th Motor Transport Regiment
  - 12th Light Infantry Division – Tikrit (probably planned to become Mech)
    - Split off from 4 Div in mid-2008
    - 46th Light Infantry Brigade (former 1 Strategic Infrastructure Bde)
    - 47th Light Infantry Brigade (former 2 Strategic Infrastructure Bde)
    - 48th Light Infantry Brigade (former 9 Strategic Infrastructure Bde)
    - 49th Brigade (4-4).

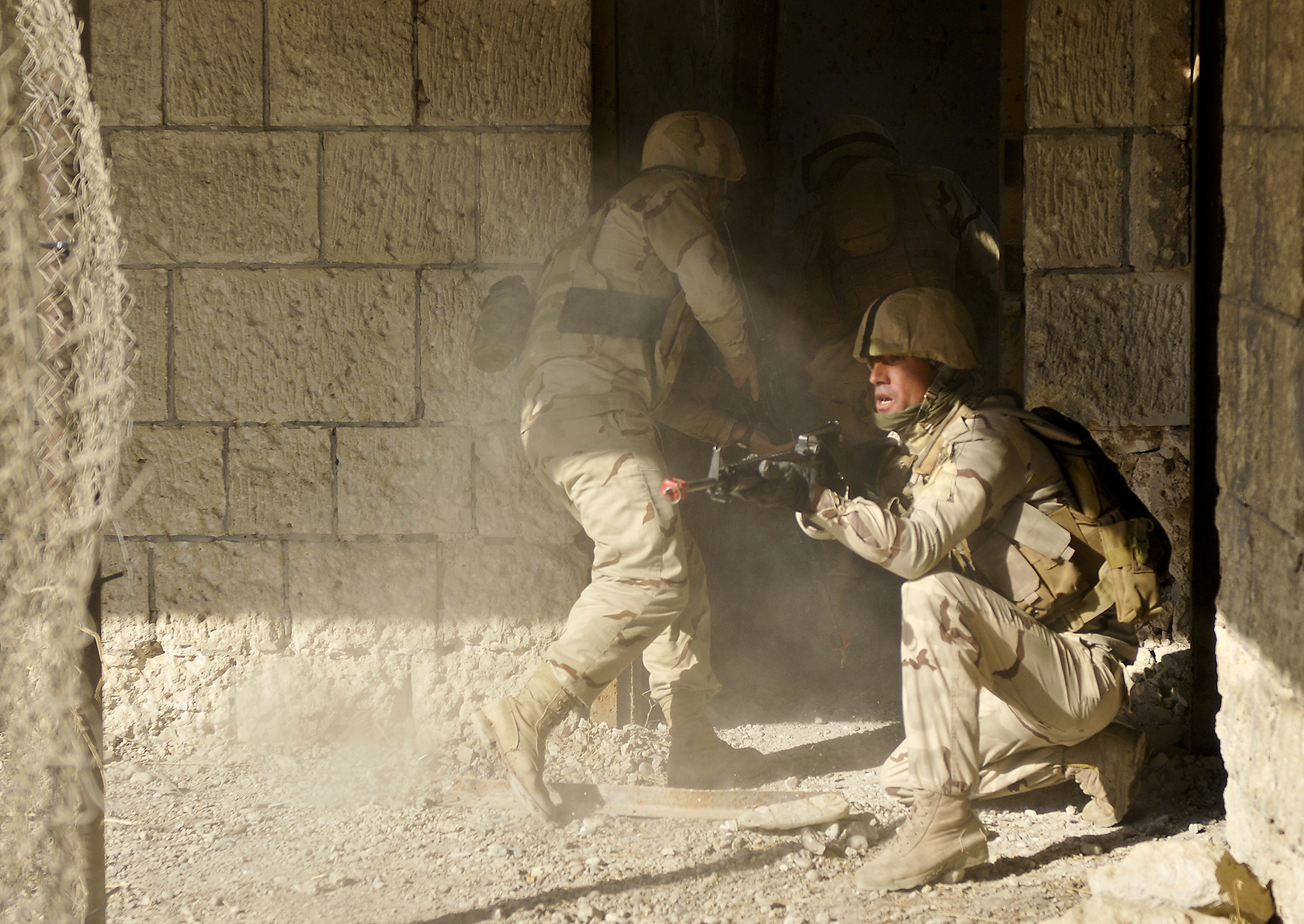
Iraqi army battalion trains for urban operations

- Basra Operations Command – Basrah
  - 8th Commando Division – Diwaniyah – The 8th Division is composed of former ING units, some of which were formed as early as 2004, but the division headquarters did not assume control of its area of operations until January 2006. As of March 2007, the division commander was Maj. Gen. Othman Ali Farhood.
    - 30th Commando (Mot) Brigade (Diwaniyah) (1-8)
    - 31st Commando (Mot) Brigade (HQ Hillah) (former 2-8)
    - 32nd Commando (Mot) Brigade (HQ Kut) (former 3-8)
    - 33rd Commando (Mot) Brigade (HQ Hussaniyah (Karbala)) (4-8).
    - 8th Field Engineer Regiment
    - 8th Transport and Provisioning Regiment
  - 10th Motorised Division – An Nasiriyah (Tallil) – On February 23, 2007, the 10th Division, at that time based in Basrah, was certified and operational responsibility was transferred to the IGFC. However, since that time, the 14th Division has been formed in Basrah and the 10th Division transferred north to An Nasiriyah. Division commander is General Abdul Al Lateef, as of November 2006.
    - 38th Motorised Brigade (HQ Batria Airport, most battalions Al Amarah)(1-10)
    - 39th Infantry Brigade (HQ Samawah) (2-10) – 2nd BN currently attached to the 8th DIV and operating in KHIDIR North BABIL
    - 40th Motorised Brigade (3-10)
    - 41st Motorised Brigade (Majaar al Kabir) – formed in November 2008 (fmr 4-10?)
    - 10th Field Engineer Regiment
    - 10th Transport and Provisioning Regiment (Nasiriyah (Camp Ur))
  - 14th Motorised Division – Camp Wessam, Basrah

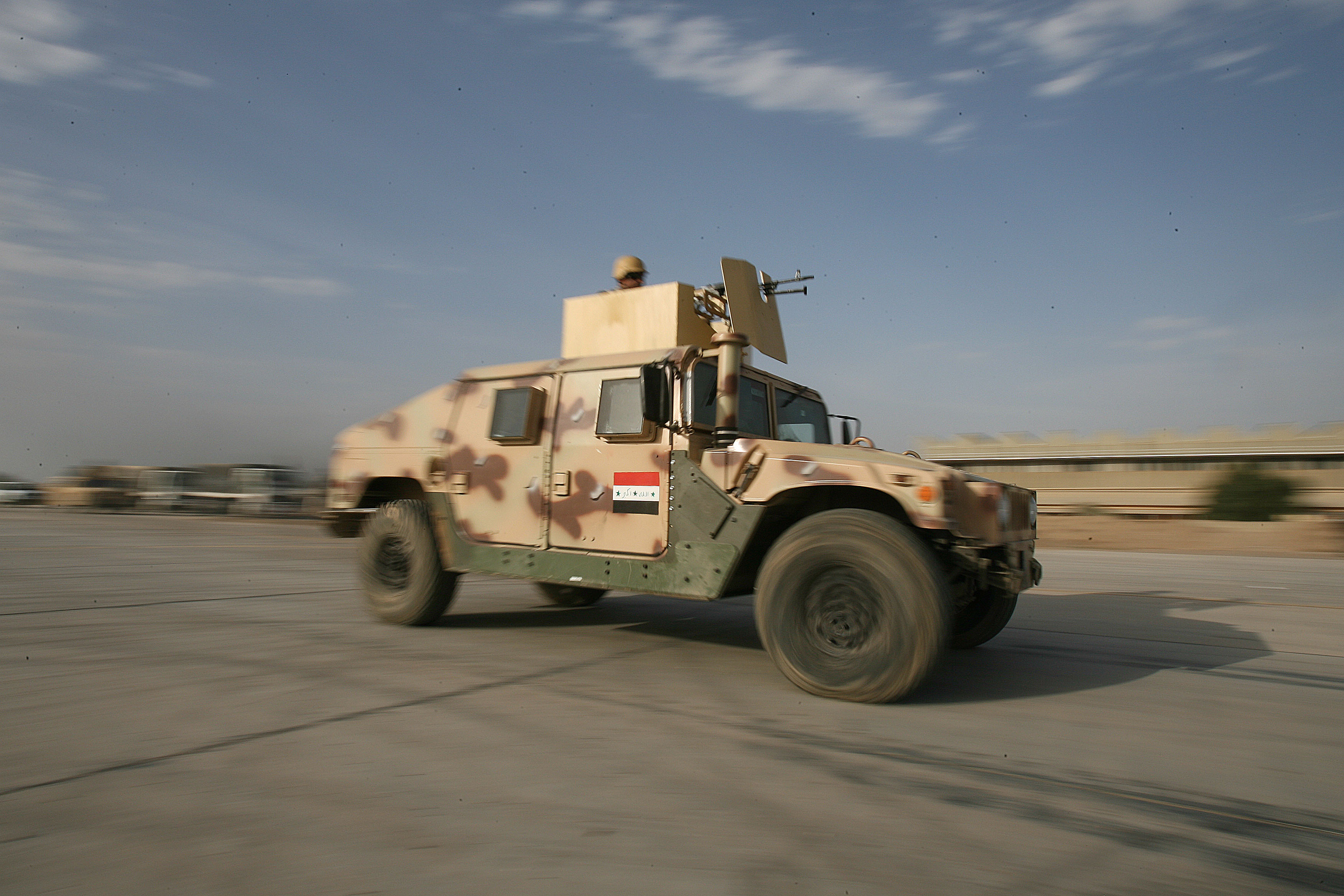
Iraqi Army HMMWV in Mar 2006

    - 50th Motorised Brigade (Basrah)
    - 51st Motorised Brigade (Basrah)
    - 52nd Motorised Brigade (Basrah)
    - 53rd Motorised Brigade (Basrah) – forming in mid-2008
    - 14th Field Engineer Regiment (Basra (Shaibah))
    - 14th Transport and Provisioning Regiment
- Anbar Operational Command – Ramadi
  - 1st Division – Fallujah
  - 7th Infantry Division – Ramadi, West Al Anbar Governate – transferred to IGFC, November 1, 2007. The 7th Division was raised in early 2005 to replace the disbanded, Sunni-dominated ING units which proved unreliable.
    - 26 Infantry Bde (former 1-7)
    - 27 Infantry Bde (former 2-7)
    - 28 Infantry Bde (former 3-7)
    - 29th Brigade (opérational since 3 April 2008).

== Commanders ==
- Abdul Qadir Obeidi (2004-2006)
- Ali Ghaidan Majid (2006-2014)
- Riyadh Tawfiq (2014-2019)
- Juma Inad (2019-2020)
- Qassim Muhammad Salih (2020-Present)

== See also ==
- Iraqi Counter Terrorism Service
