= Nassir al-Hiti =

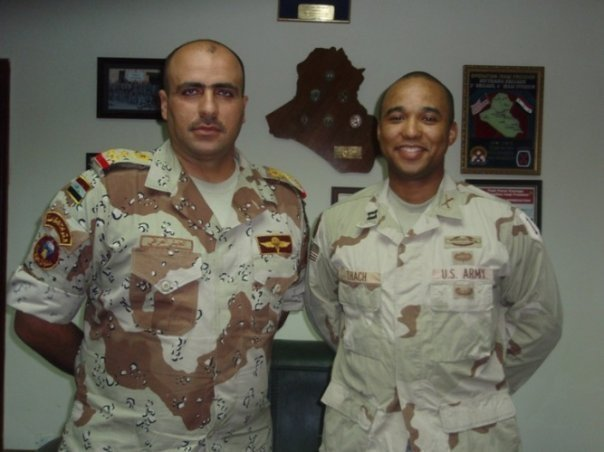
- Staff Major General Nassir al-Hiti & Captain James Văn Thạch
- Military career
- Allegiance: Iraq
- Branch: Iraqi Army
- Rank: Major General
- Unit: 2nd Division (Iraq)
- Commands: Muthanna 3rd Brigade, 6th Division

Nassir Ahmad Ghanim Al-Ogali (Arabic: ناصر احمد غانم العجيلي) is a Major General in the Iraqi Army. He was the former commanding General of Muthanna 3rd Brigade, 6th Division, Iraqi Army. He is currently the commander of 2nd Division, Iraqi Army.

== Conflicts with US Military ==
He has been under support by US allies in his battlespace for supporting their initiative in working with Abu Azzam a leader among the Awakening movements in Iraq, as it differs from his orders directed by his military supervisors under the command of Prime Minister Nouri al-Maliki.

Since he has commanded the 2nd Division, he has been supported by United States Army General Raymond T. Odierno, who stated, The security forces here are widely considered to be part of the problem. The police are believed to be infiltrated by insurgent groups, and one of the main Iraqi army commanders for the area Nasser al-Hiti, is known for harsh tactics. But in contrast, Nassir has long been praised by the Ministry of Defence Lieutenant General Abd al-Qadr Muhammed Jassim al-Obaidi and is seen as a favorite of Iraqi Prime Minister Nouri al-Maliki.

== Comments from supporters ==
There’s no shortage of troops for Baghdad, a place much easier for the Iraqi military to patrol. And many of these troops are actually pretty darn good. I would cite the example of an officer such as Brig. Gen. Nassir al-Hiti of the Muthana Brigade in Abu Ghraib. I would put him up against the best Brig. Gen. in any NATO army, including America’s. But there are certain pockets of Abu Ghraib that he is not allowed to patrol because the US military has struck deals with local CLC commanders who were active in the Islamic Army or the 1920 Revolution Brigades. Problem is, these CLCs are not, in fact, keeping a tight lid on soft-insurgent actions (...such as lobbing mortars) or organized crime networks as well as Gen. al-Hiti is doing. Why continue subsidizing what’s failing (the ex-insurgents, who can barely stay ahead of Al-Qaeda’s assassins) and not using what’s succeeding (the Iraqi Army)? commented by Nibras Kazimi نبراس الكاظمي a visiting Scholar at the Hudson Institute in Washington DC, and he writes a weekly column on the Middle East for the New York Sun, and a monthly column for the Prospect Magazine (UK).

== Quotes ==
- Referring to President-elect Barack Obama: "Everyone in Iraq likes him," said the general, Nassir al-Hiti. "I like him. He's young. Very active. We would be very happy if he was elected president." But mention Obama's plan for withdrawing American soldiers, and the general stiffens. "Very difficult," he said, shaking his head. "Any army would love to work without any help, but let me be honest: For now, we don't have that ability."
- "Whatever the outcome of the United States elections, I call on the American politicians not to betray the Iraqis that believe in them such as their ally Cambodian Prince Sisowath Sirik Matak stated in a letter to American ambassador John Gunther Dean, in response to Dean's offer to evacuate Matak after the U.S. Democrat-controlled Congress deliberately pulled the rug out from under democracy in Southeast Asia in 1975."
