= Ninewa Operational Command =

Inter-agency command of Iraqi armed forces

The Ninewa Operational Command (NOC) is a interagency command of the Iraqi Armed Forces and Iraqi Ministry of the Interior. Up until 2014 it had its headquarters in Mosul. It holds responsibility for all anti-ISIS operations in Ninewa Governorate.

In January 2008, during the Ninewa Province Campaign, Iraq established the Ninewa Operational Command, to coordinate the various Iraqi Armed Forces and police operating in the region, as well as to liaise with U.S. and allied forces there. A Sunni Arab, Major General Riyadh Jalal Tawfiq, previously commander of the 9th Armoured Division, was selected to command the NOC.

There had been long-running and significant disputes about the integration of Kurdish forces into the Iraqi Army. There were publicly revealed plans to establish two Iraqi Army divisions with Peshmerga, Kurdish Regional Guards, manpower. In autumn 2007 Prime Minister Nouri al-Maliki ordered the establishment of two divisions with Peshmerga manpower. The 15th Division was to be established in the Kurdish Democratic Party areas of Erbil and Dohuk, and the 16th Division in the Patriotic Union of Kurdistan area in Sulaymaniyah. Each was to have a strength of 14,700 (and transferring soldiers to the main Iraqi Army was planned to shield the remaining Peshmerga from painful personnel cuts.) Recruiting began in 2008 but neither division was active by 2009 (or mid-2014). The two divisions were not established and the Kurdish Peshmerga remained under their own commanders and in their own party-divided command structure.

== ISIS assault 2014 ==
During the Fall of Mosul to the Islamic State in Iraq and Syria (ISIS) in mid-2014, the NOC was supervising the 2nd Division and the 3rd Brigade of the 1st Division. The 2nd Division, along with the 4th Division and 12th Division in the Tigris Operational Command to the south all collapsed and dissolved in the face of the ISIS assault.

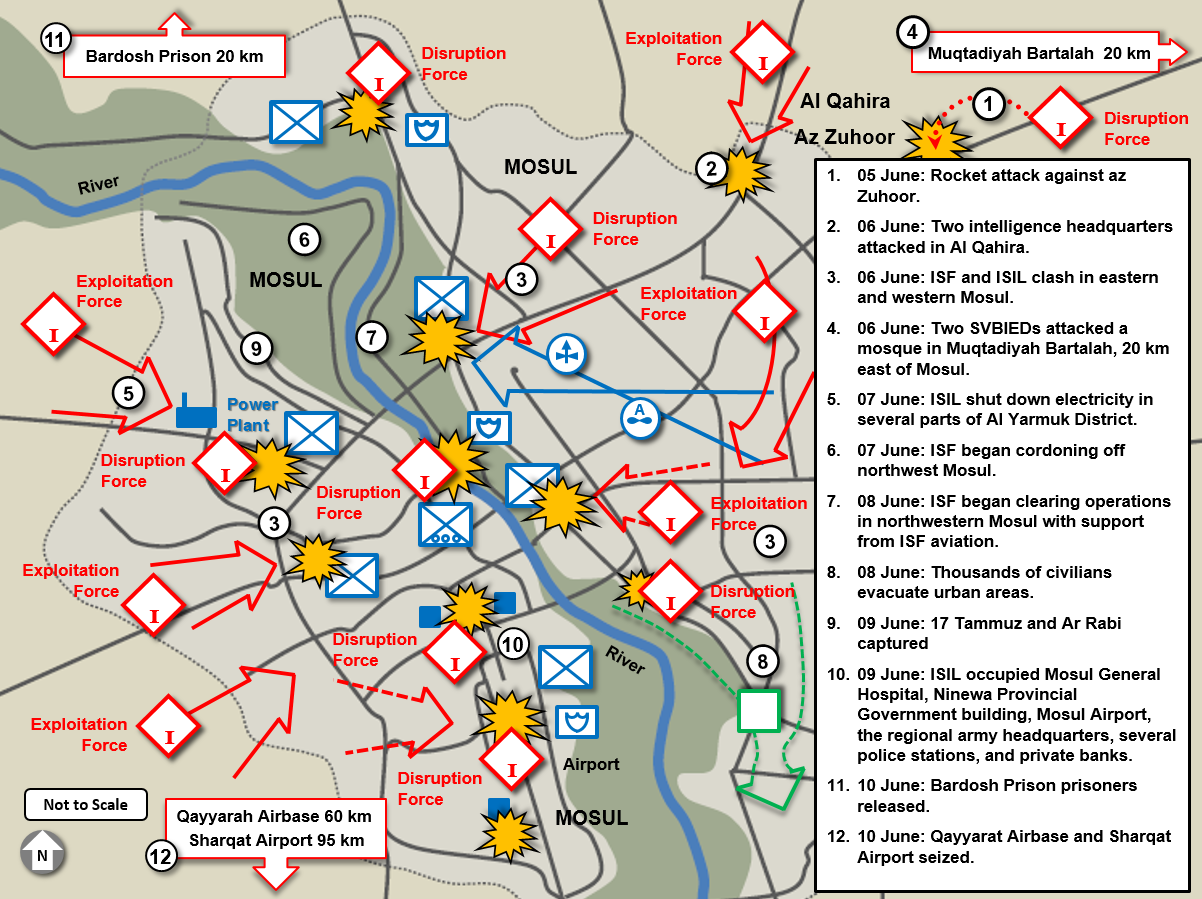
US Army diagram of the fall of Mosul

On 4 June, Iraqi police, under the command of Lieutenant General Mahdi Al-Gharrawi, cornered ISIL military leader Abu Abdulrahman al-Bilawi near Mosul, in Iraq. Al-Bilawi blew himself up, and Gharawi hoped it would prevent an attack.

At 02:30 in the morning, ISIL convoys of pickup trucks, each truck carrying four fighters, entered Mosul by shooting at the city's checkpoints. Though Mosul's first line of defense was thought to contain 2,500 soldiers, Al-Gharrawi says that "reality was closer to 500". He noted that since all of the city's tanks were being used by Iraqi forces in Al Anbar Governorate, the city was left with little to combat the ISIL fighters. The insurgents hanged, burned, and crucified some Iraqi soldiers during their attack.

The night of 9 June, generals Aboud Qanbar and Ali Ghaidan Majid decided to withdraw across the river, leaving General Al-Gharrawi, the operational commander of Nineveh Governorate, at his command post without any orders. Ghaidan and Qanbar's retreating convoy created the impression that Iraq's security forces were deserting and so Iraqi Army soldiers started to flee Mosul. The 2nd Division (Iraq) had deserted the city within a few hours and both Ghaidan and Qanbar arrived in Kurdistan the next day.

On the morning of 10 June, Gharawi and 26 of his men, who were still at the operation command centre in the western part of the city, decided to fight their way across a bridge to eastern Mosul. On the east bank, their five vehicles were set ablaze and after coming under heavy fire, during which three of the soldiers were killed, it was every man for himself, as Gharawi said. In the east, Gharawi and three of his men commandeered an armoured vehicle with flat tires and headed north to safety. The militants were in control of much of the city by midday on 10 June. The militants seized numerous facilities, including Mosul International Airport, which had served as a hub for the U.S. military in the region. It was thought all aircraft located there had been captured, including helicopters and jet fighters. The militants also claimed to have released at least 2,400 prisoners, after seizing police stations and prisons across the city. However, after the takeover of Badush prison near Mosul, ISIL separated and removed the Sunni inmates, while the remaining 670 prisoners were executed. At the end of 10 June, ISIL was considered to be in control of Mosul.

The 3rd Federal Police Division (Iraqi Federal Police), under the auspices of the Ninewa Operational Command with its headquarters in Mosul, collapsed in the Northern Iraq offensive by 9 June. Also among the faltering units was the 9th Brigade dispatched from the 4th Federal Police Division. Poor logistics and corrupt senior officers left the brigade without adequate food and/or water.

== After the fall of Mosul ==
The Nineveh Operational Command was dissolved in 2014 but them was reformed in April 2015.

Two new divisions established and sent north after 2014 to join the Ninewa Operational Command were the 15th Division, formed in 2015, with the 52nd, 71st, 72nd, 73rd, 74th, and the 92nd Brigades, and the 16th Division with the 75th, 76th, and 91st Brigades. The 15th and 16th Divisions were formed from units and elements of the 2nd, 3rd, and 4th Divisions that the U.S. and its Operation Inherent Resolve partners reconstituted and retrained. However parts of the 15th Division, raised in central Iraq, were never sent north to fight, as the Baghdad Belts had an ISIS presence and numerous Shite militias. Also part of the command was the 3rd Federal Police Division under Saleh al-Amiri, with the 9th and 10th Brigades (in Ninewa Governorate) and the 11th, 12th, and 21st Brigades (in Salah al-Din Governorate). The division was reportedly compromised by Iranian Popular Mobilization Forces proxies.

Major General Najim Abdullah al-Jabouri was in command in early 2015. By late 2020, and after a series of changes by the government of Mustafa Al-Kadhimi, Maj. Gen. Ismail Shihab al-Mahlawi was transferred to command the NOC, after ten years of combat in Anbar (commanding the 7th Division and the Anbar Operational Command).
