= Abdul Qadir Obeidi =

31st Iraqi Minister of Defense

Abdul Qadir Al-Obeidi
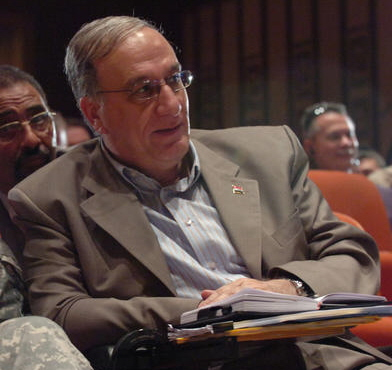

31st Defence Minister of Iraq
- In office 6 March 2006 – 21 December 2010
- President: Jalal Talabani
- Prime Minister: Nouri al-Maliki
- Preceded by: Saadoun al-Dulaimi
- Succeeded by: Nouri al-Maliki (acting)

General Commander of the Iraqi Ground Forces (IGF)
- In office 2004–2006
- President: Jalal Talabani
- Prime Minister: Ibrahim al-Jaafari
- Preceded by: Position created
- Succeeded by: Lt. General Ali Ghaidan Majid

General Commander of the Iraqi Armored Corps
- In office 1988–1991

Iraqi Institute of Armored Sciences Dean
- In office 1986–1988

Personal details
- Born: Abdulqadir Mohammed Jassim Al-Mafraji; 1947 (age 78–79) Baghdad, Kingdom of Iraq
- Party: Independent
- Children: 5
- Education: Iraqi Military Academy, Camp Rustamiyah1968/ class 47; Vystrel Russian Military Academy, M.S (Soviet Union) 1975. Iraqi Staff College, M.S1979.
- Profession: Military Officer (Tanker), Politician
- Awards: 6 medals of honor

Military service
- Allegiance: Iraq
- Branch/service: Iraqi Army / Iraqi Armed Forces
- Years of service: 1966–1994; 1994–2003 (court martialled); 2003–2006
- Rank: General
- Battles/wars: Iran–Iraq War

General Abdulqadir Mohammed Jassim Al-Mafraji (/ˌæbdʊlˈkɑːdər ˌɑːmɪˈfɑːrdʒi/ AB-duul-KAH-dər AH-mif-AR-jee; Arabic: عبدالقادر محمد جاسم المفرجي; born 1947) commonly known as Abdul Qadir Al-Obeidi or Obeidi (Arabic: عبد القادر العبيدي, was the 31st Defence Minister of Iraq in the Council of Ministers of Prime Minister Nouri al-Maliki from March 2006 to December 2010.

== Life and education ==
Alobeidi was born in Baghdad 1947 for a mid class family in Al-Fadil city (مدينة الفضل), which is located in Alrisafa district. His tribe Almafraji is one of the famous Iraqi tribes that resides in southern Karkuk (Alhaweeja district) and Salah Aldeen provinces. This tribe includes the famous Iraqi families such as Al-Buniya, Al-Jidda, and Al-Aftan. The name Al-Obaidi came from a common claim that states Almafraji tribe was part of Al-Obaidi tribe before it became an independent tribe; in fact, the Al-Obaidi and Almafraji tribes both reside in Alhaweeja district.

He is one of the major generals in the Iraqi army during Saddam Husain's ruling time. He finished all his education (primary, mid, and graduated from Alnidal high school) in Baghdad.

In 1966 he attended the Iraqi Military Academy (الكلية العسكرية), graduated with honor in 1968 / class 47 (الدورة ٤٧) as a second lieutenant to serve in the Iraqi Armed Forces.

In 1973, the Iraqi Ministry of Defense sent him to study in the Soviet Union to earn a Master's of Science degree in Aerodynamics of tanks weapons from Vestrel academy of military science; graduated in 1975.

In 1977, he attended the Iraqi Staff College (كلية الأركان العراقية) and graduated in 1979.

== Military service ==
Alobeidi is considered one of the Iraqi military officers who greatly participated in developing the Iraqi Armored Corps; moreover, he became the general commander of the Iraqi Armored Corps from 1988–1992. Prior to this position, he was the dean of the Iraqi Institute of Armored Sciences (معهد الدروع) from mid 1986 to 1988. That institute was considered one of the best Institutes in the Middle East.

He has several publications and studies regarding the Tanks and Ballistics. One of his positions during the Iran-Iraq war (at the earliest time of the war) was a tank battalion commander in the 10th armored brigade (اللواء المدرع العاشر), which was one of the elite armored brigades in the Iraqi Armed Forces, especially when that armored brigade achieved a superior victory by completely destroying and captivating the Iranian Golden Division (80th armored division) in Alkhafjia battle (معركة الخفاجية سوزنجارد1982). He then became a brigade commander in one of the armored divisions. He also served several times in the Iraqi Ministry of Defense headquarters in Baghdad as the secretary of the Minister of Defense to Adnan Khairallah (عدنان خير الله).

In 2004, he joined the new Iraqi army, serving first as the commander of the operations center and then commander of military operations in western Iraq. Prior to his appointment as Minister on 8 June 2006, he was the commander of the Iraqi Ground forces (IGF).

At the end of 2004, he was mandated to establish the Iraqi Ground Forces Command exactly after the Second Battle of Fallujah; thus, he was the first IGF's commander.

== Political life ==
After the Gulf War of 1991, he started to criticize Sadam's regime, and opposed the 1990 invasion of Kuwait; as a result, he was demoted and sentenced to seven years in prison with confiscation of his movable and immovable assets. Nevertheless, he was under security surveillance after releasing from the prison and banned from leaving Iraq.

Alobaidi was the first Iraqi military commander to lead new Iraqi military forces that was participated alongside American troops to liberate Fallujah city from terrorists and outlaw armed groups in November 2004. As a result, Abd al-Nasir al-Janabi, who was one of Iraqi Council of Representatives members (later in March 2007 the Iraqi Supreme Judicial Council requested that the Council of Representatives lift Abd al-Nasir al-Janabi's parliamentary immunity to face charges of kidnappings and terrorism), accused him of being a "war criminal" in the military campaign of Fallujah during his confirmation hearing in the Council of Representatives.

Alobaidi is not affiliated with any political party and was known with his independency and impartiality in dealing with the Iraqi conflicts during his ministry. However, his appointment was strongly backed by the Sunni Arab-led Iraqi Accord Front, which turned against him after the first few months of his ministry as a result of his refusal to be a biased and insisted upon being a minister for all Iraqis. Thus, he faced aggressive interfering from political parties, which wanted to use the Ministry of Defense for political purposes and for their own benefit. His strong refusal to concede to their attempts of interfering in the Ministry and the Iraqi Army put him in confrontation with these political parties, which attempted to impeach him for several times during his ministry. Alobaidi was assigned to the position Minister of Defense in a very critical time, while sectarianism was in its peak and the Iraqi Army was still not ready and in a rebuilding process. Alongside this, the Iraqi Ministry of Defense was suffering from corruption, which was almost out of control. Thus, he started to change the system of the defense ministry that was established in 2004. That system was the main reason of corruption in the Ministry, giving authority to civilian employees, who don't have any military background, and delegating their powers over Iraqi military officers, which affected their efforts to enforce security in the country. Thus, he started to redo the system by reworking with the same system used by the Iraqi Ministry of Defense since its establishment in 1921 until 2003. Thus, he is responsible for the proper establishment of the Iraqi Ministry of Defence after 2003 and had spent enormous efforts to restore the prestige of the Iraqi Army. In March 2007, he said that "corruption and militias inhabit the halls" of the Defense Ministry, "fictitious employees" were "rampant" and that he is pressured to restructure his ministry along the lines of power-sharing deals. In October 2008 he announced that all soldiers and other employees of the Ministry would be forbidden from joining any political party, running for political office, working on any political campaign or even attending political demonstrations. Until December 2009, he was known as an independent minister and most of the political parties were not able to prove his political leanings. However, he was banned from the 2010 Iraqi elections over alleged links with the Arab Socialist Ba'ath Party, which were possibly fabricated.

Preceded by Saadoun al-Dulaimi	Defence Minister; 2006–2010	Succeeded by Nouri al-Maliki (acting)
