= 1st Corps (Iraq) =

1st Corps الفيلق الأول
- Active: 1980–2003
- Country: Iraq
- Branch: Iraqi Ground Forces
- Type: Corps
- Part of: Iraqi Armed Forces
- Garrison/HQ: Erbil: Al-Harir Air Base; Bamarni Air Base
- Colors: Red
- Engagements: Iraqi invasion of Iran; Iraqi invasion of Kuwait; Gulf War; Iraq War

The 1st Corps was a corps of the Iraqi Army, established before the Iran–Iraq War. It was located in Kurdistan Region.

== History ==
In 1977–78 British military attaches' reports from Baghdad said the 4th Infantry Division was part of the corps, with divisional headquarters at Mosul and brigades at Mosul (5th), Dohuk (18th), Sinjar (21st), plus two unlocated reserve brigades, the 93rd and 99th. Other divisions of the corps reportedly included the 2nd Division at Kirkuk with five brigades, including two reserve; the 7th Division at Sulaimaniyah with five brigades (all active); and the 8th Division at Erbil with six brigades, including the 91st, 95th, and 98th Reserve Brigades.

At the beginning of the Iran–Iraq War, Malovany shows corps headquarters at Kirkuk; the 11th Infantry Division with elements north of the Ranwanduz – Rayat road; and the 7th Infantry Division advancing from its bases at Sulaimaniyah towards the border between Penjwin and Sayid Sadiq.

Ahead of Operation Dawn-4, units of the 1st Corps spent two months in their trenches waiting for the Iranians to attack. The offensive came on 19 October 1983 as the Iranians and Peshmerga guerrillas of the Patriotic Union of Kurdistan took 250 square miles (650 km^{2}) of territory. This included a number of Kurdish villages and exerted a significant amount of pressure on Penjwin. Saddam Hussein responded with a counterattack, using the Iraqi Republican Guard and poison gas. However, they failed to dislodge the Iranians, who were dug-in and reinforced by Kurdish fighters.

The anti-Kurdish Anfal campaign was mounted between February and September 1988. While the Anfal campaign may have been initially conceived by the Iraqi government as a purely military campaign to destroy an insurgent movement, Kurds were killed for being Kurds, and it became ethnicised. The 1st Corps, under Lieutenant General Sultan Hashem, at Kirkuk, handled most Anfal operations, alongside the 5th Corps.

Units were transferred south out of the 1st Corps to build up Iraqi forces in the south after the Iraqi invasion of Kuwait in 1990. In 1991 the "Iraqi I Corps controlled two infantry divisions, several independent mechanized brigades, and an elite special assault brigade. These forces were stationed in or near Dohuk Province." The Iraqi 44th Infantry Division was headquartered in Zakho. During Operation Provide Comfort, "[b]y mid-May [1991], the allied security zone spread from the Turkish border about three-quarters of the way across Iraq toward the Iranian border. The 3d Commando Brigade pushed west and nudged the Iraqi 36th Infantry Division out of Batufa. From there the brigade moved on to Sirsenk where it occupied a vital airstrip.."

Before the U.S. invasion of Iraq, it had its headquarters in Kirkuk, and was orientated to the north, facing the Kurds. In late 2002, consisting of the 5th Mechanized Division (15th and 20th Mechanised and 26th Armoured Brigades); 2nd Infantry Division, 8th Infantry Division and the 38th Infantry Division (130th, 847th, 848th Infantry Brigades).

The corps was battered by the U.S. Task Force Viking (CJSOTF-North, built around the 10th Special Forces Group) during the 2003 invasion of Iraq. Among other actions, U.S.-led forces seized Kirkuk. The successful occupation of Kirkuk came as a result of approximately two weeks of fighting that included the Battle of the Green Line (the unofficial border of the Kurdish autonomous zone) and the subsequent Battle of Kani Domlan Ridge (the ridgeline running northwest to southeast of Kirkuk), the latter fought exclusively by 3rd Battalion, 10th SFG and Kurdish peshmerga against the 1st Corps.

Remnants of the corps lasted until the dissolution of the Iraqi Army by Coalition Provisional Authority Order 2 in May 2003.
