= Balad Ruz =

Balad Ruz بلدروز
- Town
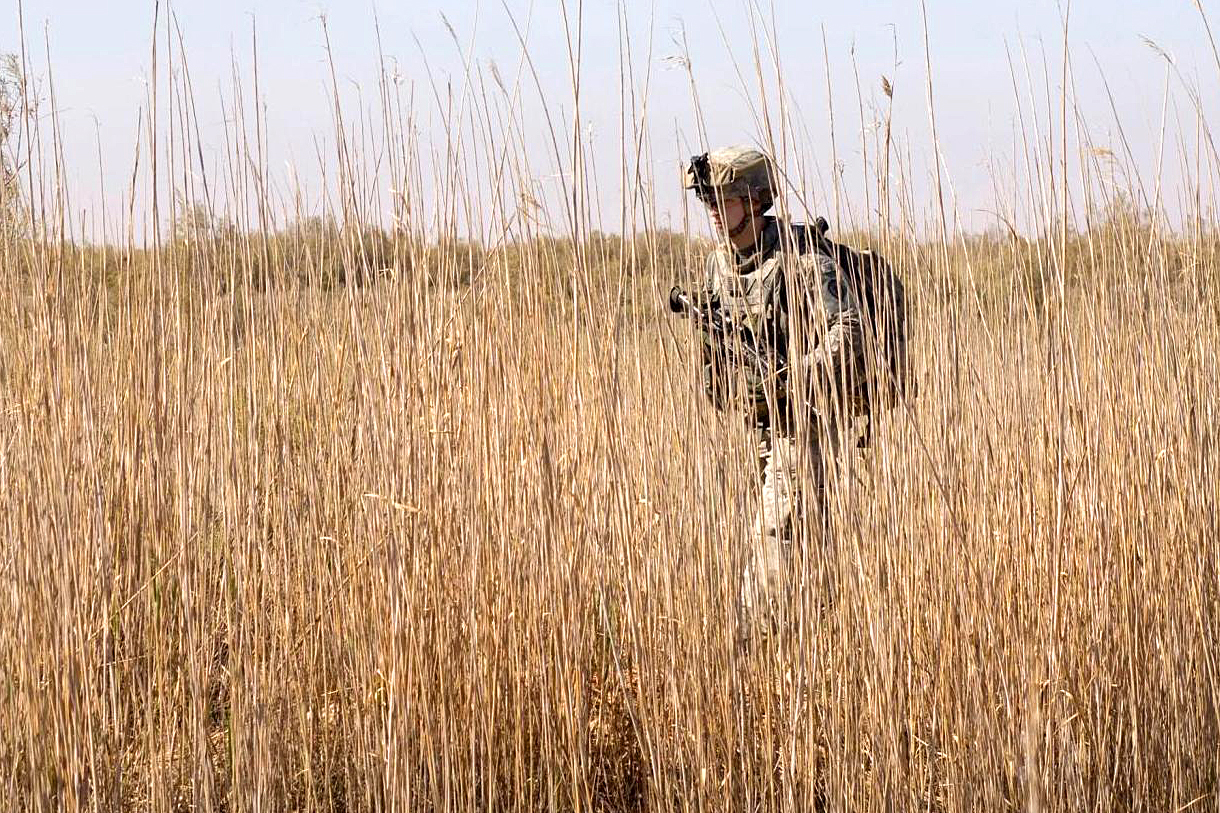

- Balad Ruz's location inside Iraq
- Coordinates: 33°42′N 45°05′E
- Country: Iraq
- Governorate: Diyala
- District: Balad Ruz

Government
  - Mayor: Mohamed Maroof Al-Hussein
- Elevation: 135 ft (41 m)
- Time zone: UTC+3
- Postal code: 32005

Balad Ruz (Arabic: بلدروز) is a city located some 120 km (75 mi) northeast of Baghdad in the Diyala Governorate of Iraq.

Balad Ruz has a radio station that was opened on 18 December 2006, known as Al Noor Radio Station, meaning "The Light" in Arabic.

The current commander of all Iraqi Army ground forces Lt. General Ali Ghaidan Majid is from Balad Ruz.

== History ==
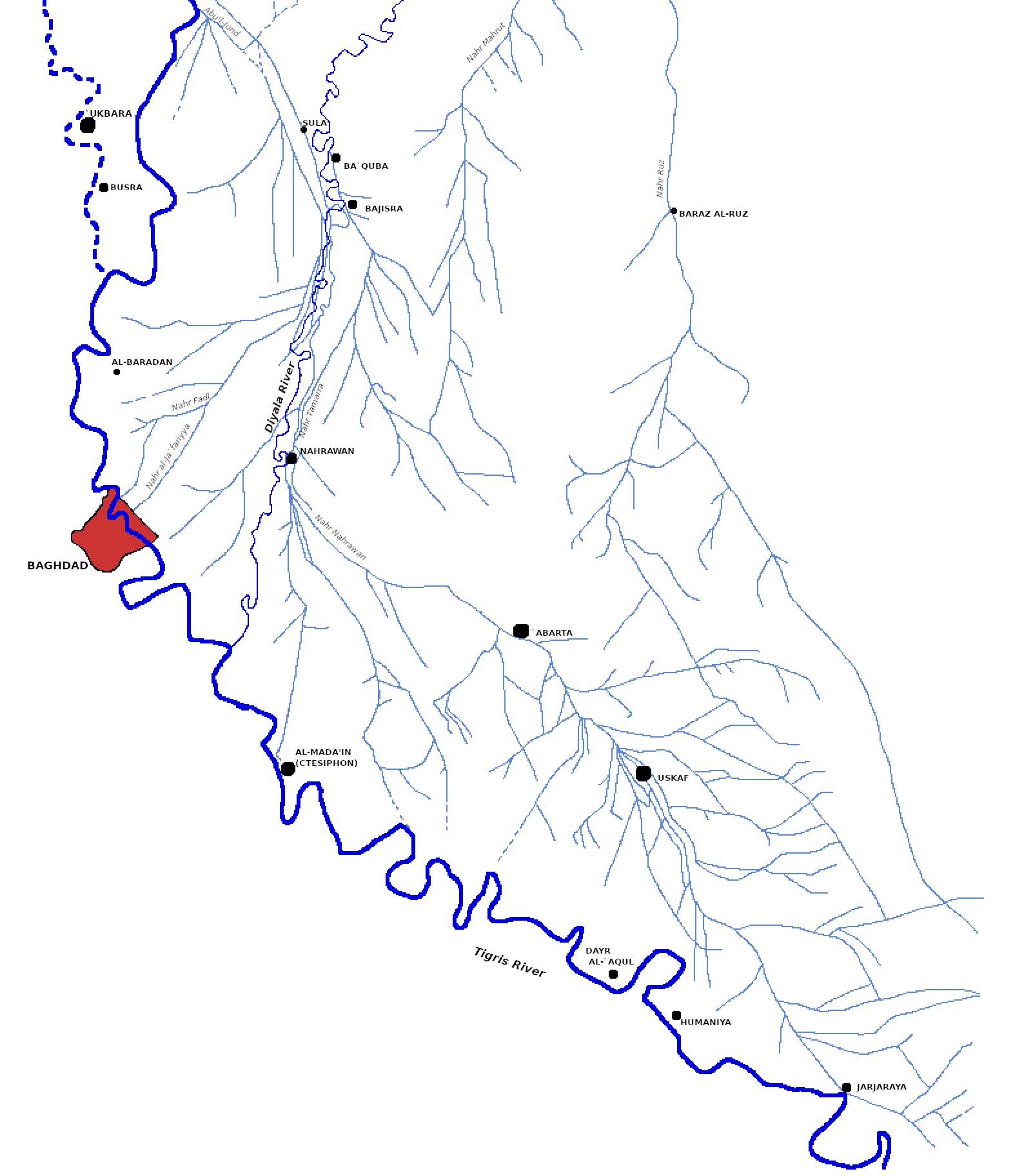
Map showing Balad Ruz (Baraz al-Ruz) in relation to other contemporary sites in the region

Balad Ruz was historically known as Barāz al-Rūz, a name meaning "the rice field". Although its origin is unclear, the city has been continuously inhabited from at least Abbasid times to the present day. The Abbasid caliph Al-Mu'tadid built a palace here. In 1340, Hamdallah Mustawfi noted that it paid 20,000 dinars annually to the treasury in Baghdad. Balad Ruz continued to prosper through the late 1700s, when it was described by an observer as a large town under the control of Baghdad. When Felix Jones surveyed the area in the mid-1800s, during the Ottoman Iraq period, he noted that the Rūz canal, on which the city lay, ended in the immediate vicinity of Balad Ruz; historically, it had extended over 50 kilometers (31 mi) further south.

== Military and security related events in Balad Ruz - Iraq war 2003-11 ==
- U.S.-led Coalition forces, in conjunction with Iraqi Army, engaged the Iranian Army on 7 September 2006.
- U.S. Forces conducted a raid on 27 December 2006, because the town was believed to be used as a safe haven by insurgent forces to traffic people, weapons and money into other regions in Iraq to disrupt security operations by coalition forces. Following the raid, Coalition Forces discovered several large caches containing hundreds of rockets, IED-making materials, small arms munitions and dozens of anti-tank weapons.
- On 1 February 2007, approximately 150 local sheikhs, city council members and local citizens gathered in Balad Ruz for a town hall meeting with the governor of Diyala (named Ra’ad Hameed Al-Mula Jowad Al-Tanimi, the 5th Iraqi Army Division commander (named Maj. Gen. Shakur Halaim Husain) and the Provincial Director of Police (Named Maj. Gen. Ghanem Abass Ibraham al-Qureshy to discuss security.

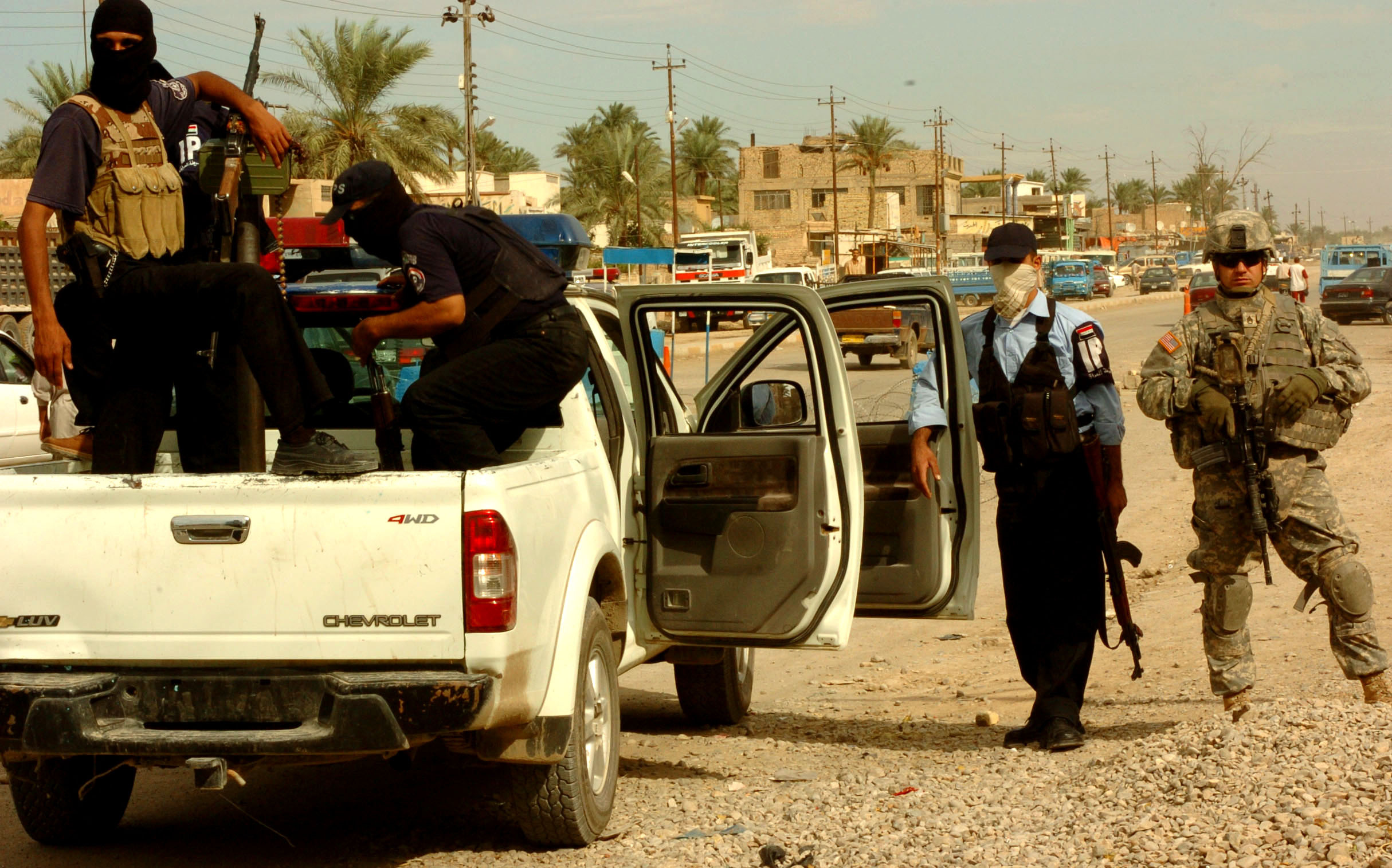
A U.S. Soldier and local Iraqi police patrolling through the Balad Ruz marketplace, 24 October 2006.
