= 2008 Nineveh campaign =

Part of the Iraq War

- Part of the Iraq War (Operation Phantom Phoenix)
Date	January 23 – July 28, 2008
Location	Nineveh Governorate, Iraq
Result	Indecisive: Insurgents manage to maintain a significant presence in Mosul and surrounding areas and make the region their last urban stronghold; Insurgents are largely isolated from the rest of the country and not able to conduct coordinated attacks outside of Ninawa.; Major fighting during the Iraq War was largely over following the offensive, leading to the beginning of the withdrawal of United States troops from Iraq and the end of the Iraq War.

Belligerents
United States; Iraq	Islamic state of Iraq; Other Iraqi Insurgents

Commanders and leaders
(United States) Maj. Gen. Mark Hertling (MND-North) (Iraq) Maj. Gen. Riyadh Jalal Tawfiq (Ninewa Operational Command) (Iraq) Brig. Gen. Moutaa Habeeb Jassim (2nd IA Division) (Iraq) Maj. Gen. Wathiq Mohammed Abdul-Qadir Hamdani (Iraqi Police) (Iraq) Brig. Gen. Salih Mohammed Hasan † (Iraqi Police)	Abu Yasir Jarullah † (ISI Field Commander); Abd-al-Rahman Ibrahim Jasim Tha'ir (POW) (ISI Mosul Commander); Abdul Khaleq al Sabaawi (POW) (Mosul Leader); Abu Mansour Ahmed Ali † (Second-in-Command); Hajji Hamdani † (AA Commander); Nawaf Lutfi Jarrah (POW) (Ansar-ul-Sunnah Commander)

Casualties and losses
(United States) 17 killed 289 security forces killed 2 captured 31 Sons of Iraq killed	224 killed 1,480 captured
- 548 civilians killed

The 2008 Nineveh campaign was a series of offensives and counter-attacks between insurgent and Coalition forces for control of the Nineveh Governorate in northern Iraq in early-to-mid-2008. Some fighting also occurred in the neighboring Kirkuk Governorate.

== Background ==
In mid-October 2006, al-Qaeda announced the creation of Islamic State of Iraq (ISI), replacing the Mujahideen Shura Council (MSC) and its Al-Qaeda in Iraq (AQI).

The capital of Ninawa province, Mosul, forms the northern tip of the "Sunni Triangle" and lies on a sectarian fault line between Sunni Arabs and Kurds. Before the Iraq War, it was a Ba'ath party stronghold and a major source of officers for the Iraqi Army. The U.S. 4th Infantry Division was originally tasked with entering northern Iraq through Turkey, however the Turkish government blocked the attempt. Instead, 2,000 paratroopers from the 173rd Airborne Brigade and 1,000 U.S. Special Forces soldiers from the 10th Special Forces group opened a smaller front from Kurdistan, working with the Kurdish Peshmerga to secure Kirkuk and Mosul. As a result, the U.S. forces did not have a large military presence in Ninawa following the collapse of the Saddam Hussein regime. In early April 2003, the 173rd Airborne launched Operation Option North to secure Kirkuk and its nearby oilfields. Meanwhile, U.S. Special Forces and Peshmerga turned towards Mosul, securing the city on April 11 after the Iraqi Army V Corps surrendered. Despite efforts by the Special Forces commander, Lt. Col. Waltemeyer to keep Kurdish forces out of the city, Mosul fell into chaos with armed Kurds looting the city and forcing Arabs out of homes. At the same time, former Ba'athists and Iraqi military personnel fled south to Tikrit and began to form the insurgency. By the end of the first week of American occupation of Mosul, 31 Iraqis had been killed and 150 wounded.

Towards the end of April, 20,000 soldiers from the U.S. 101st Airborne Division, led by Maj. Gen. David Petraeus arrived in Mosul and assumed responsibility for Ninawa province.

In January 2004, 8,700 soldiers of the 3rd SBCT/2nd Infantry Division replaced the 101st Airborne, effectively halving the number of U.S. soldiers. Ethnic tensions in Mosul grew, with the Sunni Arabs and the insurgents occupying the west side of Mosul and the Kurds occupying the east side. The situation worsened in October 2004 when the 1st SBCT, 25th Infantry Division relieved the 3/2 SBCT. The 1/25 SBCT had only 3 battalions in Mosul since one of its battalions was redeployed to Fallujah as part of Operation Phantom Fury. At the same time, insurgents moved from Fallujah to Mosul and began launching attacks. On November 11, 2004, insurgents conducted a large scale operation against police stations in Mosul, facing little resistance from the Iraqi police who refused to fight. Undermanned Coalition forces were forced to rely on thousands of Kurdish Peshmerga to help recapture the city, which was retaken after two weeks of heavy fighting.

Between 2004 and 2006, a stalemate existed between the Kurdish forces in the east of the city (who had been reflagged as the 2nd Iraqi Army Division) and Sunni insurgents who were firmly entrenched in western Mosul.

In early 2007, coalition forces launched a new counter insurgency strategy throughout Iraq, mainly focused on Baghdad and the surrounding belts. The U.S. military command responsible for Ninewa province, Multi-National Division North, was again forced to operate without one of its battalions when the 2nd battalion, 12th Cavalry Regiment was deployed to Mansoor district as part of the Baghdad Security Plan. At this point, MND-N had one combat brigade in Ninewa Province, the 4th Brigade Combat Team of the 1st Cavalry Division, under the command of COL Stephen Twitty. This unit was composed of three combat battalions, including 2nd Battalion, 7th Cavalry Regiment and 1st Battalion, 9th Cavalry Regiment stationed at FOB Marez in Mosul and 5-82 FA BN at FOB Q-West near Qayarrah. These units were supported by the 4th Special Troops Battalion and the 27th Brigade Support Battalion.

At the same time, the Iraqi Army 2nd Division had redeployed two of its battalions to Baghdad. Despite the reduced Coalition and Iraqi presence in Mosul, attacks fell by half, from between 15 and 18 attacks per day in December 2006, to 7-9 attacks in July. However, coalition operations in Diyala and Baghdad were forcing insurgents north along the Tigris River valley up to Mosul.

== Preparations ==
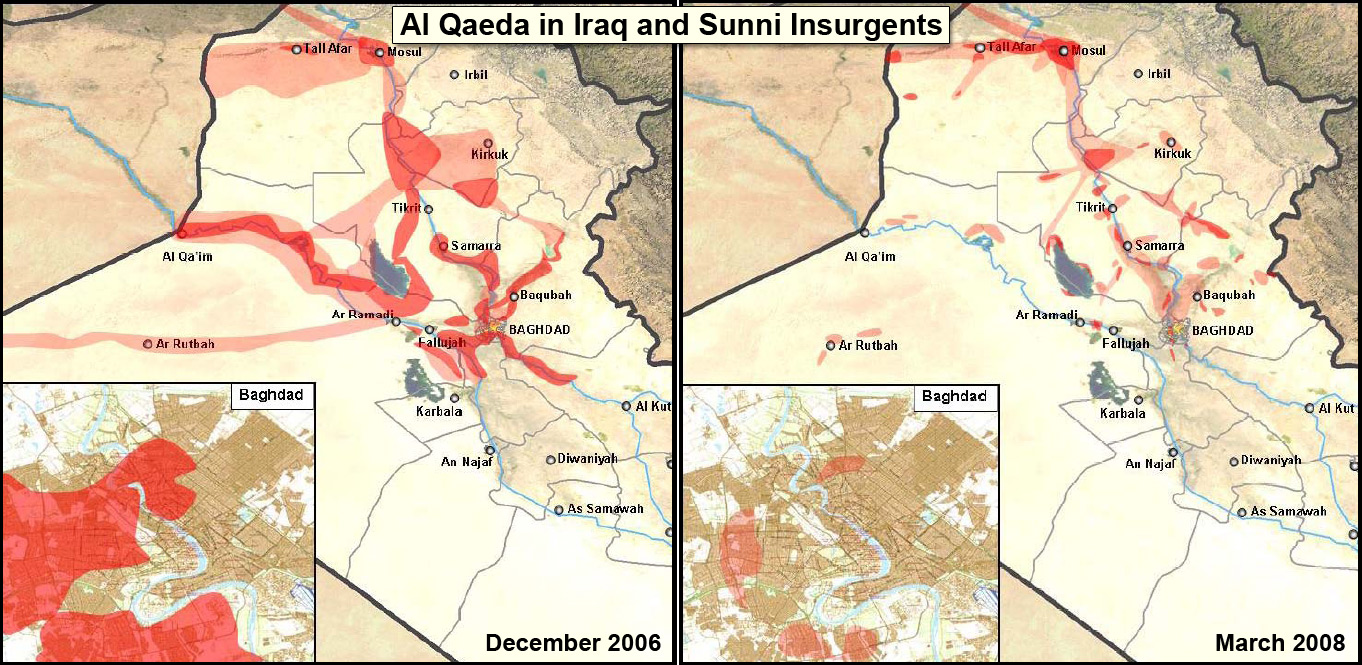
A U.S. military map used by General Petraeus in Congressional testimony in April 2008. The dark red areas represent regions where insurgents are capable of conducting operations, while the light red regions highlight insurgent transit routes.

Following their defeats during Operation Phantom Thunder and Operation Phantom Strike in 2007 the insurgents lost their primary base of operations in Diyala province and were still under attack by Coalition forces as part of operation Phantom Phoenix. Having also lost their bases in Al Anbar and in Baghdad itself, remaining insurgent forces were forced to retreat towards northern Iraq and establish their main bases in Mosul, their last supply route through which they moved weapons, personnel and money from abroad into the country. Mosul also had strong strategic importance as a main logistics hub for Al-Qaeda in Iraq because of its size and location - sitting at crossroads between Baghdad, Syria, Turkey and Iran. The insurgents established a new base in Mosul and prepared for a 'decisive final battle' in the words of the Iraqi Prime Minister Nouri al-Maliki. If they lost their center in Mosul the insurgents would not be able to effectively fight anymore.

By mid-January 2008, the US 1st Combined Arms Battalion, 8th Regiment had been redeployed to Mosul from Baghdad, joining the 3rd Squadron of the 3rd Armored Cavalry Regiment (3-3 ACR), who had been in the city since December 2007, when the 3ACR took over responsibility for Nineveh province from the 4th HBCT of the 1st Division. The city was split into two halves, with each unit responsible for security on their side. Two Iraqi Army battalions from the 2nd Division who had been deployed in Baghdad as part of Operation Imposing Law returned to Mosul. Also, in January 2008, Iraq established the Ninewa Operational Command (NOC), to coordinate the various Iraqi Security Force units operating in the province, as well as liaise with Coalition forces operating in the province. A Sunni Arab, Major General Riyadh Jalal Tawfiq, previously commander of the 9th IA Division, was selected to command the NOC.

== The campaign ==
Sporadic fighting had already been going on since late 2007, after the insurgents had been routed from Diyala. In early 2008, however, Al-Qaeda wanted to make it clear that they could still fight effectively in Iraq.

On January 23, a massive cache of explosives was detonated in an abandoned building in Mosul in the Zinjeli neighborhood. Insurgents were tipped off that Iraqi security forces were preparing to search the building and when the police came they detonated the explosive. The explosion killed 60 people, all of them civilians, wounded 280 and leveled several buildings.

The next day, as the police was investigating the scene, of the massive bombing the day before, gunmen opened fire on them. At that time a suicide bomber targeted the car of the police chief of Mosul, who was on the scene, killing him and two other policemen.

On January 25, the Iraqi Prime Minister ordered Iraqi military reinforcements to Mosul to begin an offensive to crush the remaining al-Qaeda elements that were still holding out in the area. The troops, tanks and helicopters began arriving in Mosul on January 27, including elements of the 35th Brigade, 9th (Armored) Division.

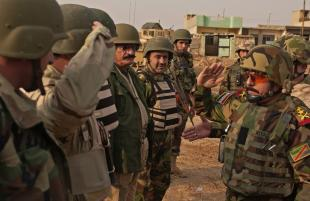
General Riyadh Jalal Tawfiq visits Iraqi troops at Combat Outpost Intisar in Mosul, February 2008

However, a day after the reinforcements arrived insurgents ambushed a U.S. military patrol in the city killing five soldiers. The patrol was initially attacked by an IED, but then insurgents in a nearby mosque opened fire on soldiers in the patrol after the roadside bombing, prompting a fierce gunbattle as U.S. and Iraqi troops secured the area. Iraqi soldiers entered the mosque but the gunmen had already fled.

During the fight for the north there was also some sporadic fighting in other areas, such as Tal Afar to the west of Mosul, Kirkuk further to the north-east and Hawija which is just south of Kirkuk.

On February 18, Coalition forces captured Abd-al-Rahman Ibrahim Jasim Tha'ir, Al Qaida's military emir for Mosul. Abd-al-Rahman was moved to Mosul from Bayji after the previous emir was captured on January 21. His capture allowed Coalition forces to develop intelligence about the Al-Qaeda in Iraq network in south-east Mosul, and on March 1 it was reported that Coalition forces had killed the military emir for south-east Mosul on February 27, Abu Yasir al-Saudi. Al-Saudi was a Saudi national who had previously fought in Afghanistan and had been involved in many deadly terrorist attacks across Mosul, including the January 28 ambush, since arriving in Iraq in August 2007 with three other Saudis. It was also reported that 142 insurgents had been killed or captured in Mosul since the operation began.

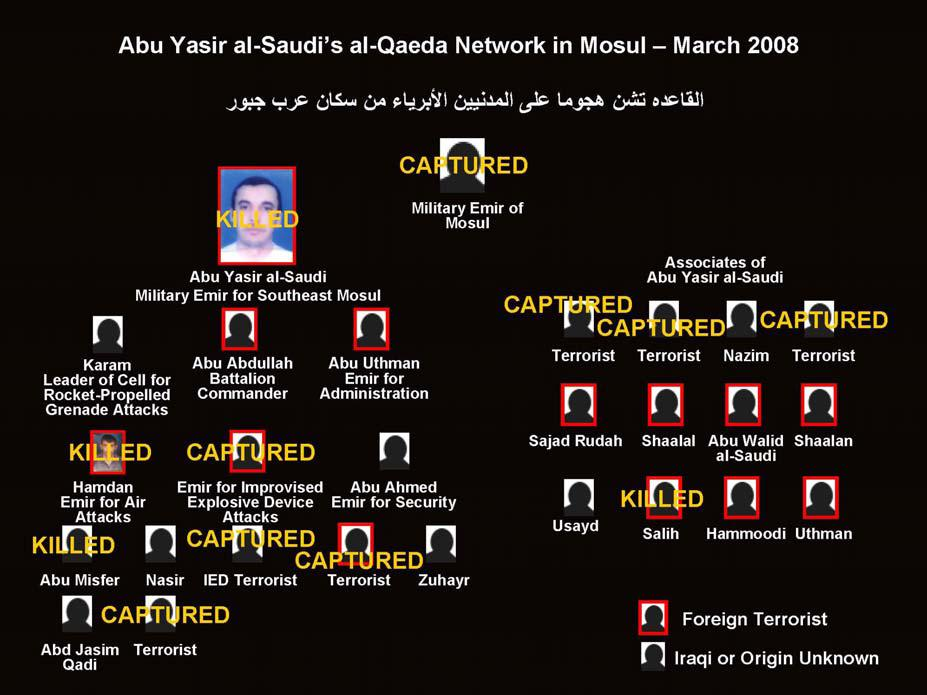
Diagram released by Coalition forces after they had killed Abu Yasir al-Saudi, Al-Qaeda in Iraq's military emir (operational leader) for south-east Mosul, in an airstrike on February 27. The figure at the top of the network is Abd-al-Rahman, Mosul's military emir who was captured February 18.

On March 15, a force of between 10–12 insurgents attacked an Iraqi Army combat outpost with grenades, RPGs and small arms. The insurgents were repulsed and 3 were killed in the attack.

On March 23, an insurgent suicide bomber, in a truck with a bullet-proof windshield, attacked Combat Outpost Inman, an Iraqi Army military base in western Mosul. He blasted through an armored vehicle to reach the courtyard of the military headquarters. In the ensuing explosion 13 Iraqi soldiers were killed and 42 people, including 30 soldiers, were wounded.

On April 14, an insurgent suicide bomber attacked a group of Peshmerga soldiers near Sinjar. Following the attack insurgents opened up on them with small-arms fire and RPGs. 14 soldiers were killed and 15 wounded.

On April 26, insurgents attacked an Iraqi Army checkpoint in Mosul. A suicide bomber detonated an explosive laden vehicle killing 2 Iraqi civilians and wounding 4. Insurgents than followed the explosion with small arms and RPG fire. Iraqi Army and Coalition forces returned fire, killing one terrorist.

=== Operation Lion's Roar ===
On May 10, the Iraqi Army, backed by 10,000 Sunni tribesmen loyal to the government, began Operation Za'eer al-Assad Fi Saulat al-Haq (Operation Lion's Roar in Arabic) in Mosul. A curfew was placed over the city at 9 pm and arrest warrants were issued for Al-Qaeda in Iraq leaders. The operation was announced by Major General Riyadh Jalal Tawfiq in a statement at the Ninewa Operational Command headquarters. During the first day of the operation, 92 targets were raided throughout Mosul

On May 13, four days after the start of the military offensive, five Iraqi soldiers were killed in Mosul after their unit hit a roadside bomb in Mosul. The Iraqi Army announced that it had captured two senior al-Qaida in Iraq leaders east of Mosul. However, the Sunni Iraqi Accordance Front, said large numbers of gunmen had escaped to the Hamrin mountains following the start of the offensive.

On May 14, the Iraqi Prime Minister, Nouri al-Maliki arrived in Mosul to supervise the operation, mirroring a similar move made in March when he flew down to Basra to supervise the campaign there. Al-Maliki said the aim of the offensive was to clear the city of "criminal terrorist gangs" and "it intends to provide suitable conditions for the operation of state offices, enabling it to reconstruct the city and to deliver services to its people." The U.S. military spokesman, Maj. Gen. Kevin Bergner, announced that Iraq and U.S. forces had arrested 500 people and captured 5 weapons caches. A spokesman for the Iraqi Defence Ministry said that the Iraqi Air Force was providing 24-hour surveillance of Ninewa to Iraqi commanders, a role that was previously provided by Coalition forces.

May 15–16, Iraqi forces announced that they had detained 833 people in Operation Lion's Roar since it began. Two civilians were killed by stray bullets during fighting in Mosul, while Iraqi Special Operations Forces captured a wanted Islamic State of Iraq (ISI) member in western Mosul who was responsible for IED emplacements and providing information to ISI about the Iraqi Army. Iraqi security forces announced a 10-day amnesty for Iraqis to hand in medium and heavy weapons in exchange for cash.

On May 19, Iraqi forces reported that they had captured Abdul Khaleq al Sabaawi, the emir of Ninawa province, in a raid in Tikrit. The same day in the town of Baaj, 130 kilometers from Mosul, gunmen ambushed a bus carrying police recruits killing 11 of them. On May 23, Iraqi police announced the capture of Abu Ahmed, an al-Qaida in Iraq financier for the three northern governorates of Salah-ad-din, Kirkuk, and Ninawa. He also led several attacks against coalition forces in Salah-ad-din.

On May 24, the Iraqi military operation in Mosul was declared over and the city and surrounding areas declared secured by the military. The Iraqi Army stated that Al-Qaeda had been cleared from their remaining stronghold in the country. During the operation 14 Iraqi soldiers were killed. Five when they were captured and executed and nine by two roadside bombs.

=== Al-Qaeda's counterattack ===
Following the strong success of Operation Lion's Roar, remnants of insurgent forces tried to conduct a string of bombings to counteract the military operations.

On May 29, a double suicide bombing hit the north of the country. A suicide bomber in Sinjar, near the Syrian border, killed 17 people and wounded 42 others. 16 of the dead were policemen or police recruits. One civilian was also killed. The police chief was dismissed over the incident. Meanwhile, in Mosul, a suicide bomber driving a police vehicle killed three police commandos and wounded nine others, including two policemen. In a separate attack, at least 20 civilians were wounded when a car bomb exploded near a bus station in Mosul.

On June 2, a suicide bomber with a car packed full of explosives targeted the Ninawa police station in eastern Mosul, killing 13 people, including five policemen, and wounding 50 others.

On June 4, insurgents ambushed a U.S. military patrol in the town of Hawija, in the neighboring Kirkuk Governorate, killing three soldiers.

On June 8, a suicide car bomber attacked a U.S. military outpost in Hawija leaving one U.S. soldier dead. Another 18 soldiers and two Iraqi contractors were wounded.

On June 26, a car bomb attack targeted the offices of Ninawa Provincial Governor Duraid Kashmula in Mosul. The attack left 18 people dead and 80 wounded. By this time it was reported that all security gains made by the security forces during operation Lion's Roar had disintegrated. Insurgents managed to re-enter the city and gunmen were seen roaming the streets in force.

=== Death of Al-Qaeda Leader in Mosul ===
On June 27, the U.S. military announced that it had killed Abu Khalaf, the leader of Al-Qaeda in Mosul. He was shot dead by American forces during a raid on a building in Mosul. Al-Qaeda suffered perhaps its greatest blow when American soldiers killed Khalaf, the "emir of Mosul". He had been a close associate of Abu Musab al-Zarqawi, the most notorious leader of Al-Qaeda in Iraq, who was killed in an airstrike two years before. An aide wearing a suicide vest died with the emir, as did a woman who tried to pull the detonator on his vest.

=== U.S. news coverage of victory over Al-Qaeda ===
On July 7 the Investor's Business Daily posted an editorial lamenting the failure of U.S. news media to report the defeat of Al-Qaeda in Iraq (AQI), while London's The Sunday Times reported, "the culmination of one of the most spectacular victories of the war on terror." A terrorist force that once numbered more than 12,000, with AQI strongholds in the west and central regions of Iraq, has over two years been reduced to a mere 1,200 fighters, backed against the wall in the northern city of Mosul.

The editorial stated that the destruction of Al-Qaeda in Iraq was one of the most unlikely and unforeseen events in the long history of American warfare.
