= 8th Division (Iraq) =

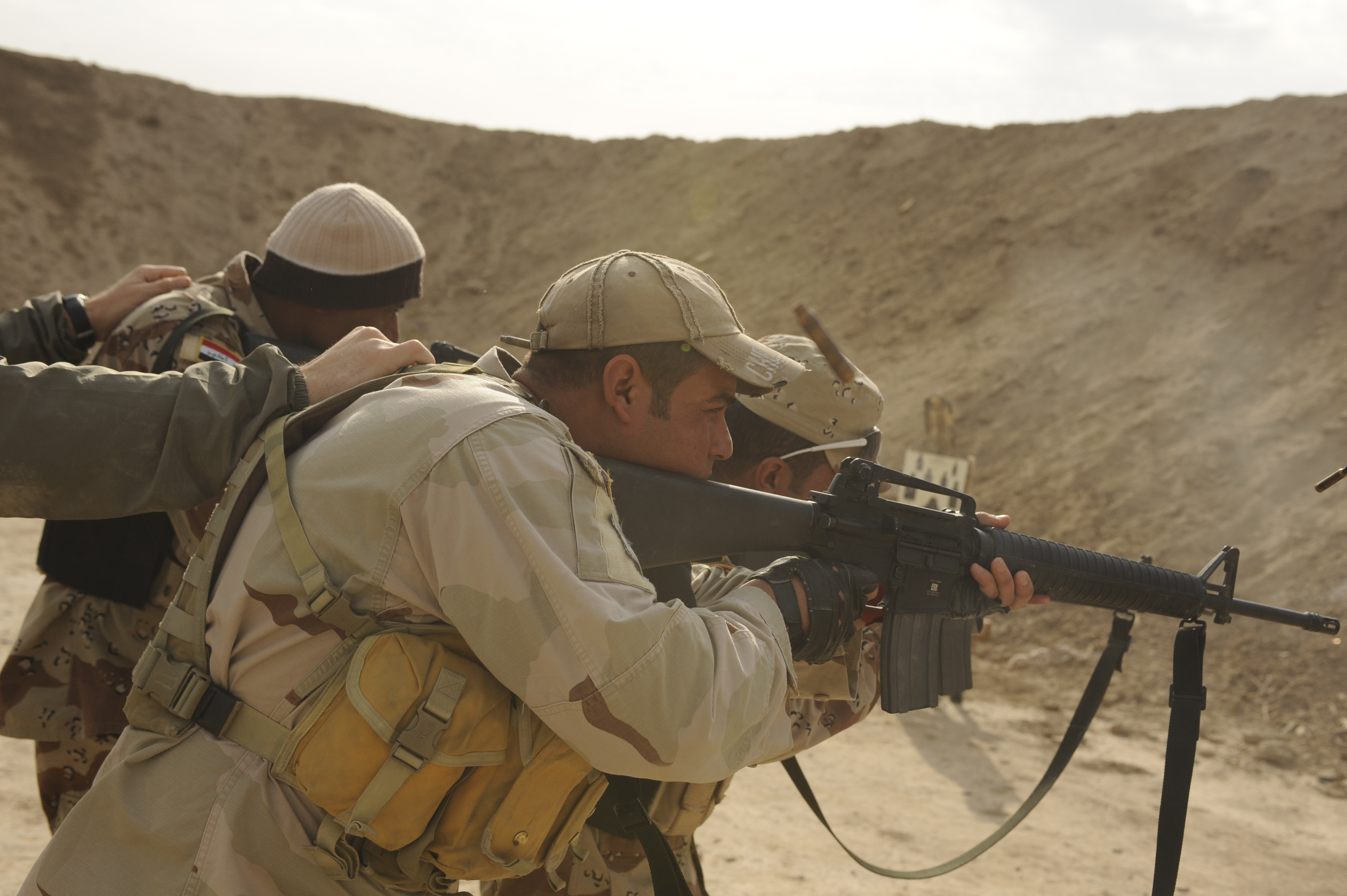
- Iraqi Army soldiers at live fire exercise
- Active: 2005–present
- Country: Iraq (2005–present)
- Allegiance: Iraq
- Branch: Iraqi Army
- Size: Division
- Part of: Iraqi Ground Forces Command
- Engagements: Iran–Iraq War; Syrian Civil War

Commanders
- Notable commanders: Maj. Gen. Othman Ali Farhood

The 8th Division is a division of the Iraqi Army. Before being reformed after 2004 it was part of the previous Iraqi Army. Just before the Iran–Iraq War it was located at Erbil as part of the 1st Corps. The 8th Division is composed of former Iraqi National Guard units, some of which were formed as early as 2004, but the division headquarters did not assume control of its area of operations until January 2006.

On 7 September 2006, Prime Minister Nouri al-Maliki signed a document taking control of Iraq's small naval and air forces and the 8th Iraqi Army Division, based in the south. The 8th Division's commander, Brig. Gen. Othman al-Farhoud, told the Associated Press his forces still needed support from the U.S.-led Coalition for things such as medical assistance, storage facilities and air support, stating:

"In my opinion, it will take time before his division was completely self-sufficient."

As of March 2007, the division commander was still Othman Ali Farhood, but he had been promoted to Major General. The division took part in Operation Lion's Leap in November 2007.

In 2010 the division comprises:

- Division Headquarters, Diwaniyah
- 30th Commando (Motorised) Brigade, HQ Wasit
- 31st Commando (Motorised) Brigade, HQ Diwaniyah
- 32nd Commando (Motorised) Brigade, HQ Kut
- 33rd Commando (Motorised) Brigade, HQ Hussainiyah (Karbala)
- 8th Field Engineer Regiment, Diwaniyah
- 8th Transport and Provisioning Regiment, Numaniyah/Diwaniyah

== Bibliography ==
- Deady, Timothy. "A Year With the Best Division in the Iraqi Army". Military Review (November-December 2009): 43–56.
- Malovany, Pesach (June 2017). Wars of Modern Babylon". University Press of Kentucky. ISBN 978-0813169439..
