= 2nd Division (Iraq) =

- Active: 1941-2014
- Country: Kingdom of Iraq (1941–58); Republic of Iraq (1958–68); Ba'athist Iraq (1968–2003); Iraq (2003–2014)
- Allegiance: Iraq
- Branch: Iraqi Army
- Type: Infantry
- Size: Division
- Part of: Iraqi Ground Forces Command
- Garrison/HQ: Kuwait & Baghdad
- Engagements: First Kurdish-Iraqi War; Iran–Iraq War; First Battle of Khorramshahr; Gulf War; Iraq War; Syrian Civil War

Commanders
- Notable commanders: Brig. Gen. Mutaa al-Khazraji

Insignia
- Division Flag

The 2nd Division was a formation of the Iraqi Army. It was theoretically headquartered at Mosul, but was driven out of the city by the Islamic State. No reliable reports of its continued existence have surfaced since June–July 2014. Previously, the 2nd Division was one of the most experienced formations in the Iraqi Army.

The previous 2nd Division had been one of the four original divisions of the Iraqi Army, being active in 1941. The division was stationed in Kirkuk in 1941, and was there when the Anglo-Iraqi War took place. Under Saddam Hussein's rule it fought the Kurds in 1961–70, being able to reverse most of the Kurdish gains of their initial offensive of autumn 1961. However it began to suffer from desertion. In 1963 it was concentrated in eastern Kurdistan and probably took part in later offensives. The first Kurdish war ended with the Kurds being granted autonomy. In 1977-78 it was in the north, with its headquarters in Kirkuk as part of the 1st Corps, including five brigades (two reserve) according to British military reports now accessible at The National Archives, Kew. The division was later present in Kuwait during Operation Desert Storm. It was initially assigned to 2nd Corps in the Qasr as Sabiyah area, in mid January 1991, but had moved to just north of Al Jahra on 24 February 1991.

In 2002 it was still in the north as part of the 1st Corps, made up of the 2nd, 4th, and 36th Infantry Brigades. After the 2003 invasion of Iraq, the Iraqi Army was disbanded in mid-2003.

After the creation of the New Iraqi Army by the Coalition Provisional Authority, the division was reformed. It was certified and assumed operational responsibility for counter-insurgency operations in the city of Mosul on December 21, 2006. The 2nd Division's battalions used to be former Iraqi National Guard units, and were manned predominately by Kurdish troops, many being former Peshmerga militia units.

Its subordinate formations included:

- 5 (Citadel) Motorized Brigade (formerly 4th Bde)
- 6 (Scorpions) Infantry (AAslt) Bde (former 2nd Brigade, 2nd Division)
- 7 Infantry Brigade
- 8 Infantry Brigade
- 2nd Motor Transport Regiment

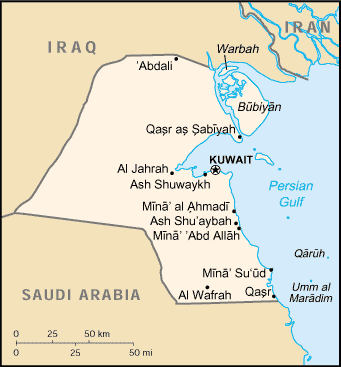
The 2nd Division was located in the Qasr as Sabiyah area in mid January 1991 and by 24 February 1991 was in the al-Jahrah area

Three battalions from what was then the Iraqi Army's 4th Brigade graduated basic training in a "march-on" ceremony at the Al Kasik Military Training Base west of Mosul, Oct. 15, 2004. Reports from 2005 indicated that the then 4th Brigade was a former Peshmerga formation. The 2nd Brigade, 2nd Division was formerly known as the 7th Brigade, IIF before the re-organization of the Iraqi Army. The 2nd Brigade of the 2nd Division is composed of the 1st, 2nd, and 3rd Battalions.

As of March 2008, the 2nd Division's headquarters was at Al Kindi Base, and the division was commanded by Brig. Gen. Mutaa al-Khazraji.

After the creation of the Ninewa Operational Command in 2008 the division became part of the new command.

The division collapsed after June 6–7, 2014, as the Islamic State in Iraq and the Levant (ISIL) seized huge amount of territory across the north of Iraq, including Mosul.

== Notes ==
- Kenneth M. Pollack, Arabs at War: Military Effectiveness, 1948–91, University of Nebraska Press, Lincoln and London, 2002, ISBN 0-8032-3733-2
