= 4th Division (Iraq) =

Iraqi Army division

- Active: c. 1930s–2003; 2004–present
- Country: Kingdom of Iraq (1930s–1958); Iraqi Republic (1958–1968); Ba'athist Iraq (1968–2003); Iraq (2004–present)
- Allegiance: Iraq
- Branch: Iraqi Ground Forces
- Type: Motorised Infantry
- Size: Division
- Part of: Iraqi Ground Forces Command
- Garrison/HQ: Tikrit, Iraq
- Engagements: Second World War; Middle Eastern theatre; Anglo-Iraqi War; First Iraqi–Kurdish War; Iran–Iraq War; Operation Tariq al-Qods; Iraq War; 2003 invasion of Iraq

Insignia
- Division Flag

The 4th Division is a motorized-infantry division of the Iraqi Army. It is currently headquartered in Tikrit city. It was formed before 1941, disbanded in 2003, but reactivated after 2004.

== History ==
The division was one of the four original divisions of the Iraqi Army, being active in 1941. At the beginning of the Anglo-Iraqi War it was in Al Diwaniyah on the main rail line from Baghdad to Basra. In 1977-78 British military attaches' reports from Baghdad said it was part of the 1st Corps, with divisional headquarters at Mosul and brigades at Mosul (5th), Dohuk (18th), Sinjar (21st), plus two unlocated reserve brigades, the 93rd and 99th. Before the 2003 invasion of Iraq it was part of the 5th Corps in the north, consisting of the 5th, 29th, and 96th Infantry Brigades. It was disbanded along with the rest of the army by Coalition Provisional Authority Order Number 2 in mid-2003.

It was later reformed with the rest of the Iraqi Army. The 4th Division's battalions were former Iraqi National Guard units, recruited locally. The division was ethnically diverse and had operational control of a number of Strategic Infrastructure Battalions protecting oil pipelines. The Strategic Infrastructure units have now been split off to become the 12th Division. The 4th Brigade of the 4th Division was transferred to the 12th Division, and a new 17th Brigade was being trained in July 2008.

Today its base is in the city of Tikrit. It was certified and assumed responsibility for most of Salah ad Din Governorate and At-Ta'mim Governorate, including the major cities Samarra and Tikrit in 2006. However, in mid-2010 it relinquished responsibility of the At-Ta'min Governorate and currently remains responsible for the security of the majority of Salah Ad Din.

The 14th Brigade was deployed as part of the force during the Operation Charge of the Knights in Basra in May 2008, but has subsequently moved to assume responsibility for the Sharqat area north of Tikrit.

== Composition ==
- Division Headquarters – Tikrit
- 14th Infantry Brigade – HQ near Bayji
- 16th Motorised Brigade – HQ near Tuz
- 17th Motorised Brigade – HQ Samarra and under the command and control of the Samarra Operations Command
- 48th Motorised Brigade – HQ near Tikrit
- 4th Field Engineer Regiment – HQ near Tikrit
- 4th Field Artillery Regiment – Planned HQ near Bayji
- 4th Transport and Provisioning Regiment – Tikrit, but scheduled for inactivation
- 4th Commando Battalion – HQ near Tuz
- 4th Reconnaissance and Surveillance Battalion – HQ near Tikrit
