= Ali Ghaidan Majid =

Iraqi general (born 1950)

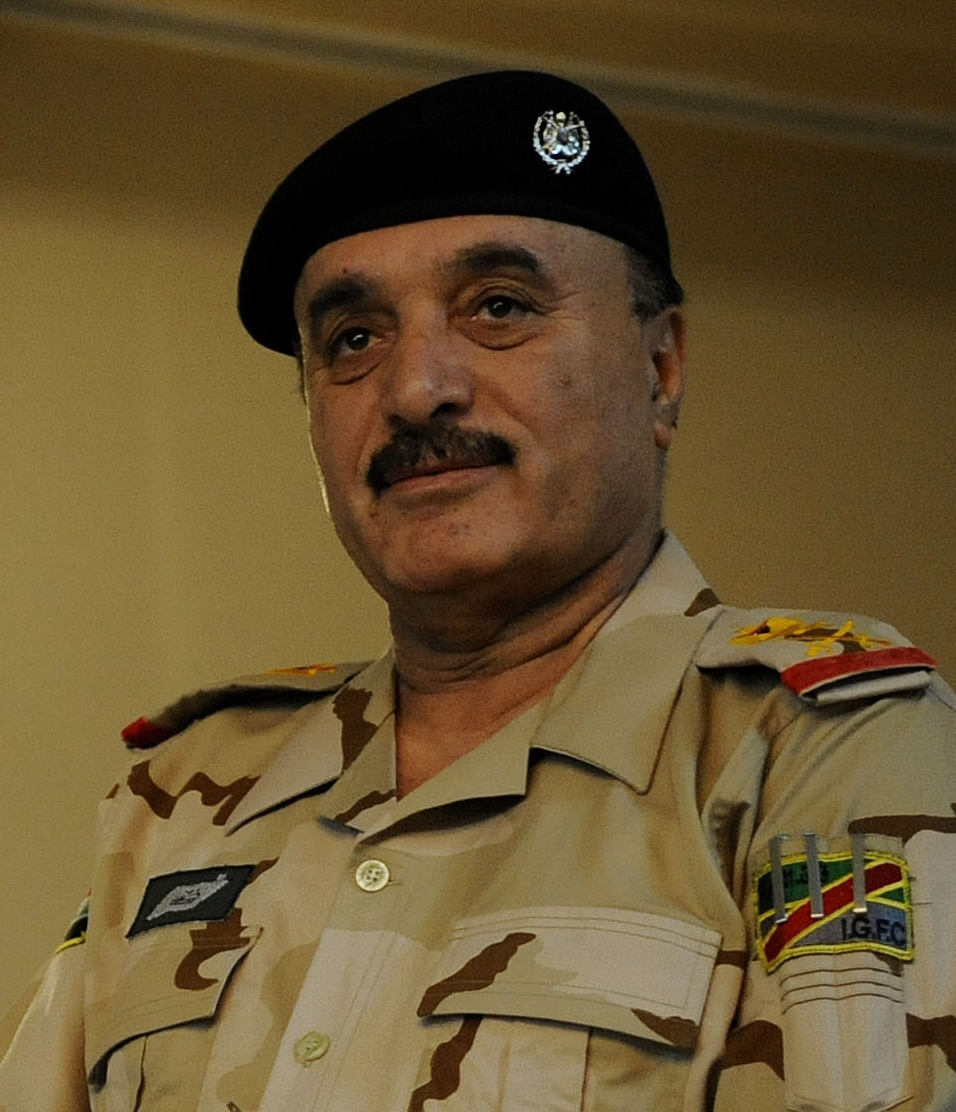
- Ghaidan in 2009.
- Born: c. 1950; Balad Ruz, Diyala Governorate, Kingdom of Iraq
- Military career
- Allegiance: Iraq
- Branch: Iraqi Ground Forces
- Rank: Lieutenant General
- Commands: Commander of Iraqi Ground Forces
- Conflicts: Iran-Iraq War; Gulf War; Iraq War; War in Iraq (2013–2017)

Lt. General Ali Ghaidan Majid (born 1950) is an Iraq military officer who was the commander of the Iraqi Ground Forces between 2006 and September 2014. He is from the Balad Ruz area of Diyala Province, Iraq. He served in the Iraqi Army during the regime of Saddam Hussein, but like a number of other generals, was imprisoned by Saddam following the Gulf War.

== Sources/external links ==
- http://www.nytimes.com/2007/05/15/world/middleeast/15embed.html
- http://www.nytimes.com/2009/02/14/world/middleeast/14iraq.html

== See also ==
- Iraqi security forces
- Iraq War
- War on terrorism
