= Results of the January 2005 Iraqi parliamentary election =

Party	Votes	%	Seats	Leader(s)
United Iraqi Alliance	4,075,295	48.19	140	Abdul Aziz al-Hakim, Ibrahim al-Jaafari, Hussain al-Shahristani
Democratic Patriotic Alliance of Kurdistan	2,175,551	25.73	75	Jalal Talabani, Masoud Barzani
Iraqi List	1,168,943	13.82	40	Iyad Allawi
The Iraqis	150,680	1.78	5	Ghazi al-Yawer
Iraqi Turkmen Front	93,480	1.11	3	San'an Ahmed Agha
National Independent Cadres and Elites	69,938	0.83	3	Fatah al-Sheikh
People's Union	69,920	0.83	2	Hamid Majid Mousa
Islamic Group of Kurdistan	60,592	0.72	2	Ali Bapir
Islamic Action Organization In Iraq – Central Command	43,205	0.51	2	Ala Humud Salih al Tamah
National Democratic Alliance	36,795	0.44	1	Samir Sumaidaie
Rafidain List	36,255	0.43	1	Yonadam Kanna
Reconciliation and Liberation Bloc	30,796	0.36	1	Misha'an al-Juburi
Iraq Assembly of National Unity	23,686	0.28	0	Nehro Mohammed
Assembly of Independent Democrats	23,302	0.28	0	Adnan Pachachi
Iraqi Islamic Party	21,342	0.25	0	Mohsen Abdel-Hamid
Islamic Dawa Movement	19,373	0.23	0	Adil Abd al-Raheem
Iraqi National Gathering	18,862	0.22	0	Hussein al-Jibouri
Iraqi Republican Assembly	15,452	0.18	0	Saad Assim Abboud al-Janabi
Constitutional Monarchy - Al-Sharif Ali bin Al-Hussein	13,740	0.16	0	Sharif Ali bin al-Hussein
Assembly for Iraqi Democracy	12,728	0.15	0	Raheem a-Sa'edi
Independent	11,614	0.14	0	Ali Muslim Jar Allah Ali al-Bithani
Hashemite Iraqi Monarchist Assembly	9,781	0.12	0	Salman Hussein al-Ajeeli
Democratic National Alliance	9,747	0.12	0	
Democratic Iraqi Current	8,331	0.10	0	Aziz Al-Yasiri
Democratic Iraq Assembly	8,316	0.10	0	Farqad Al-Qazwini
Islamic Vanguard Party	7,182	0.08	0	Ali Al-Yasiri
National Front of the Unity of Iraq	7,126	0.08	0	Hasan Al-Lahibi
Assyrian National Assembly	7,119	0.08	0	Audishoa Malko
Democratic Common Action Front	6,772	0.08	0	
Islamic Reconciliation Movement	6,706	0.08	0	
Free Officers and Civilians Movement	6,372	0.08	0	Najeeb Al-Salihi
Democratic Islamic Current	6,130	0.07	0	Hussien Al-Adili
Islamic Union for the Philean Kurds of Iraq	5,986	0.07	0	Tha'r Al-Philee
Independent List	5,981	0.07	0	
Democratic Popular Assembly	5,852	0.07	0	
Independent	5,652	0.07	0	Abd Al-Sattar Al-Qat' Al-Abodi
Democratic Islamic Party	5,581	0.07	0	Abbas Al-Askari
Independent	5,519	0.07	0	Malik Abd Al-Hussein Ghafoori
Democratic Iraqi Popular Party	5,206	0.06	0	
Kurdistan Democratic Solution Party	5,183	0.06	0	Fa'aq Mohammed
Independent	5,127	0.06	0	Amin Haider Al-Hassani
Justice and Future Alliance	4,527	0.05	0	Sami Falih, Shamil Darweesh
Independents List	4,524	0.05	0	
General Union for the Youth of Iraq	4,344	0.05	0	
Yazidi Movement for Reform and Progress	4,327	0.05	0	
Democratic Iraqi Nation Party	4,295	0.05	0	
Democratic Two Rivers Alliance	4,141	0.05	0	
15th of Sha'ban Islamic Movement	4,075	0.05	0	
Independent	3,935	0.05	0	Ali Abd Hamza Al-Timimi
Islamic Unity Party in Iraq	3,822	0.05	0	
United Democratic Iraq Congress	3,759	0.04	0	
Community Party	3,742	0.04	0	Saad Saleh Jaber
National Brotherhood Movement	3,561	0.04	0	
Democratic Society Movement (Hamad)	3,527	0.04	0	
Turkoman National Movement	3,450	0.04	0	Husam Al-Deen Ali
Democratic Qasimi Assembly	3,434	0.04	0	Qasim Al-Janabi
New Iraq Revival Movement	3,346	0.04	0	Ahmed Mohammed Faisal
Democratic Assembly of Iraqi Tribes	3,342	0.04	0	Ghalib Sa'ood
Iraqi Democratic Liberal Party	3,084	0.04	0	
Islamic Conference for the Tribes of Iraq	3,034	0.04	0	
Independent Iraqi Assembly for Liberation and Construction	3,024	0.04	0	
Iraqi Commission for Independent Civil Society Organisations	2,922	0.03	0	Basil Abd Al-wahab Al-Azzawi
Independent	2,842	0.03	0	Mohammed Abid Awad Al-Dilemi
Independent Al-Faratin Bloc	2,598	0.03	0	
Free Democratic Country Party	2,473	0.03	0	Haithem Al-Hasani
Independent	2,459	0.03	0	Al-Sayed Kazhim Jasim Ali, Al-Fadhili Al-Husseini
Independent	2,298	0.03	0	Ibrahim Khalil Sa'eed Al-Isawi
Independent	2,204	0.03	0	Mohammed Muhsin Ali Al-Zubaidi
National Gathering	2,123	0.03	0	
Independent	2,116	0.03	0	Mohammed Khathim Fayrouz Al-Hindawi
Independent	2,038	0.02	0	Nizar Talib Abd Al-Karim
Assembly of Iraqi Independent Statement	1,971	0.02	0	
Bloc of the al-Shabania Iraq Uprising of 1991	1,956	0.02	0	
Kurdistan Conservative Party	1,942	0.02	0	Zyad Omar Khider Surchi
Arabic Democratic Front	1,907	0.02	0	
Council of the United Tribes of Mosul	1,900	0.02	0	
Iraqi National Brotherhood Party	1,868	0.02	0	
Independent	1,813	0.02	0	Falah Hasan Abd Al-Amir Al-Arithi
National al-Risalia List	1,722	0.02	0	
Independent	1,691	0.02	0	Sheik Sa'doon Ghulam Ali, Abd Al-Karim Al-Lami
Democratic National Party	1,603	0.02	0	
Turkoman Brotherhood Party - Iraq	1,591	0.02	0	
Iraq Pro-Democracy Party	1,566	0.02	0	
Iraqi National Movement and Iraqi Independent Alliance for Civil Society Organisations	1,558	0.02	0	Hasan Mustafa al-Naqib, Basil Abdul Wahab Al-Azzawi
Independent	1,478	0.02	0	Amer Ali Hussein Owaid Al-Murshidi
Thar Allah Islamic Organisation General Centre of Iraq	1,467	0.02	0	
Independent	1,434	0.02	0	Al-Sayyed Ahmed Tah, Ahmed Yassin Mahmoud
Democratic Construction Party	1,409	0.02	0	
National League of Iraqi Leaders and Sheiks - National Tribes Organisation	1,399	0.02	0	
Iraqi Council for Non-Governmental Humanitarian Organisations	1,360	0.02	0	Jabbar Me'taff Hassoon
Independent	1,348	0.02	0	Ahmed Hassan Mahmoud
Independent Iraqi Bloc	1,347	0.02	0	
Assembly of Grandsons of Twenties Revolution	1,331	0.02	0	Abd Al-Hussein Al-Yasiri
Independent	1,312	0.02	0	Mush'al Awad Al-Sari
National Assembly for the Centrist Current	1,305	0.02	0	
Independent	1,213	0.01	0	Baqir Al-Baqir, Magister Hindsa Biah
Unity Party	1,202	0.01	0	
Independent	1,194	0.01	0	Mahmoud Tah Aboud Al-Qarnah Al-Jomhoori
Independent	1,165	0.01	0	Ibrahim Shafik Khalil Ibrahim Al-Basri
Independent	1,132	0.01	0	Mohammed Rashad Al-Fadl
Independent Babylon Assembly	1,018	0.01	0	
Independent	1,005	0.01	0	Mohammed Daham Nazal
Baghdad Citizens Independent Assembly	982	0.01	0	
Independent	931	0.01	0	Abbas Ali Zaki Hassun Al-Maiah
Independent	728	0.01	0	Abd Jasim Al-Sa'dee
Independent	725	0.01	0	Muthana Fadhil Mohammed Ibrahim
Independent Progressive Front	677	0.01	0	
Independent	522	0.01	0	Wadi Mohammed Al-Khalifa
Iraqi National Salvation Party	496	0.01	0	
Independent	411	0.00	0	Ghalib Muhsin Abd Hussein Al-Sabahi
Total	8,456,263	100.00	275	
Valid votes	8,456,263	98.90		
Invalid/blank votes	94,305	1.10		
Total votes	8,550,568	100.00		

== Al Anbar ==
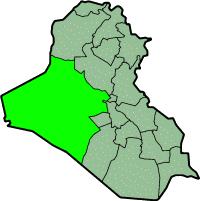
Al Anbar

Party	Votes	%
Iraqi List	5,263	40.52
United Iraqi Alliance	4,786	36.85
The Iraqis	1,377	10.60
Coalition for Iraqi National Unity	631	4.86
Independent Democratic Gathering	393	3.03
Iraqi Islamic Party	235	1.81
Iraqi Constitutional Monarchy	127	0.98
Other parties	177	1.36
Total	12,989	100.00
