= Follow-Up and Arrangement Committee =

The Follow-Up and Arrangement Committee was an alliance of Iraqi opposition groups formed in the run up to the invasion of Iraq in 2003.

== Members ==
The members of the committee were:

Name	Party
Ibrahim Hammudi	SCIRI
Ahmad Chalabi	Iraqi National Congress (INC)
Ahmad Ali Muhsin	SCIRI
Akram al-Hakim	SCIRI
Albert Yelda	Assyrian Patriotic Party
Iyad al-Samarra'i	Iraqi Islamic Party
Iyad Allawi	Iraqi National Accord
Ayham al-Samarra'i	Democratic Centrist Tendency
Bayan al-Araji	SCIRI
Bayan Jabr	SCIRI
Tawfiq al-Yasiri	Iraqi National Coalition
Jalal al-Talabani	Patriotic Union of Kurdistan
Junayd Manko	Independent
Jawad al-'Attar	Islamic Labor Organization in Iraq (an affiliate of SCIRI)
Jawhar Namiq Salim	KDP
Hatim Mukhlis	Iraqi National Movement
Hatim Sha'lan Abu al-Joun	Tribal confederations
Hajim al-Hassani	Iraqi Islamic Party
Hamid al-Bayati	SCIRI
Husayn al-Juburi	Independent
Husayn al-Sha'lan	Democratic Centrist Tendency
Husayn al-Shami	SCIRI
Ridha Jawad Taqi	Islamic Task Organisation
Su'ad al-Krimawi	SCIRI
Sa'd al-Bazzaz	Independent
Sa'd Jawad	Jund al-Imam
Sa'd Salih Jabir	Free Iraq Council
Sa'dun al-Dulaimi	Independent
Sinan al-Shabibi	Independent
Sadiq al-Musawi	Constitutional Monarchy Movement
Safia al-Suhail	National Campaign to Free Iraq from Dictatorship
Salah al-Din Baha'a al-Din	Kurdistan Islamic Union
Salah al-Shaykhly	Iraqi National Accord
San'an Ahmad Agha	Iraqi Turkman Front
Tariq al-Adhami	Independent
Adil 'Abd al-Mahdi	SCIRI
Abbas al-Bayati	Islamic Association of Iraqi Turkmens
Abd al-Aziz al-Hakim	SCIRI
Abd al-Sattar al-Jumaily	Independent
Abd al-Majid al-Khoei	Al-Khoei Foundation
Izz al-Din Salim	SCIRI
Ali bin al-Husayn	Constitutional Monarchy Movement
Ghassan al-Atiyyah	Democratic Centrist Tendency
Faruq Rida'a	Union of Iraqi Democrats
Fouad Masoum	Patriotic Union of Kurdistan
Qadir Aziz	Kurdistan Toilers' Party
Karim Ahmed	Kurdistan Communist Party
Kanan Makiya	Independent
Kosret Rasoul Ali	Patriotic Union of Kurdistan
Goran Talabani	INC "Independent Democrats Bloc"
Mohammad Bahr al-Ulloum	Islamic Dawa Party
Muhammad Taqi al-Mawla	Shi'a Turkoman; affiliate of SCIRI
Muhammad al-Haydari	SCIRI
Muhammad 'Abd al-Jabbar	Islamic Cadres Movement, Kawadi al-Da'wa
Muhammad al-Haji Mahmud	Kurdistan Socialist Democratic Party
Mas'ud al-Barzani	KDP
Mish'an al-Juburi	Iraqi Homeland Party
Mudhar Shawkat	Iraqi National Movement
Mu'afak al-Rubay'i	Independent
Naji Hilmi	Independent
Najim al-Din Karim	Washington Kurdish Institute
Hoshyar Zibari	KDP
Wafiq al-Samarra'i	Higher Council for National Salvation
Walid Muhammad Salih	Independent
Younadim Yusif Kana	Assyrian Democratic Movement
