= 2005 Al Anbar governorate council election =

2005 Al-Anbar governorate council election
30 January 2005	2009 →

All 41 seats for the al-Anbar Governorate council
- Turnout: 2%
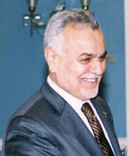
	First party	Second party	Third party
Leader	Tariq al-Hashimi	Falah Hassan al-Naqib	Misha'an al-Juburi
Party	IIP	Independent Iraqi Group	RLB
Seats won	29	8	4
Popular vote	2,692	755	328
Percentage	71.31%	20%	8.69%
Subsequent Governor
Raja Nawaf Farhan al-Mahalawi
IIP

The election for the governorate council of Iraq's Al Anbar Governorate were held on January 30, 2005, the same date as the Iraqi legislative election.

== Election ==
The largely Sunni province was one of the most violent in Iraq during the Iraqi insurgency, and turnout was extremely low, with the vast bulk of Anbar's residents choosing to boycott the election out of a mixture of distrust for a system perceived to be unfair, and a fear of violence from insurgent groups. Of the total population of some 2.2 million, only 3,775 voted in the governorate council election. Some 13,000 voted in the concurrently held transitional assembly elections.

Helped by the low turnout, the Iraqi Islamic Party was able to win 70.1% of the governorate's council seats on a total of 2,692 votes.

== Results ==
Party	Arabic name	Leader	Votes	Percent	Seats (probable)
Iraqi Islamic Party	al-Hizb al-Islami al-Airaqi	Tariq al-Hashimi	2,692	71.31%	29
Independent Iraqi Group	al-Hia al-Airaqia al-Mustaqila	Falah Hassan al-Naqib	755	20%	8
Reconciliation and Liberation Bloc	Kutla al-Musalaha wa at-Tahrir	Misha'an al-Juburi	328	8.69%	4
Total valid votes:			3,775	100%	41
Invalid votes:			28		
