= Ridha Jawad Taqi =

Iraqi politician

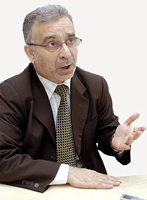
Ridha Jawad Taqi

Rida Jawad Taqi is an Iraqi politician and served until 2010 as a member of the Council of Representatives of Iraq for the Supreme Islamic Iraqi Council.

He was elected to the Council in December 2005 as part of the United Iraqi Alliance coalition.

Taqi is originally from Karbala and trained as a gas engineer. He was awarded a Diploma equivalent to B.A in Islamic law (Sharia) backdated on 2000-2001 from International College of Islamic science (ICIS) in London.

In December 2002 he was elected to the Follow-Up and Arrangement Committee which grouped Iraqi opposition exiles opposed to the government of President Saddam Hussein. He was listed as a representative of the Islamic Action Organisation, which later joined the United Iraqi Alliance coalition in the Iraqi legislative election of January 2005.

In September 2004 he was active in the negotiations that brought together the various Shi'ite Islamist parties into the United Iraqi Alliance.

In March 2005 he condemned the government of neighbouring Syria for "destabilizing the security in Iraq ... embraced leading figures of the previous regime ... it has provided terrorists with financial and logistical support" He also called for the security forces to be cleared of officers affiliated with the former regime.

In August 2005 he was reported as the head of political relations of the Supreme Council for the Islamic Revolution in Iraq, and was quoted strongly supporting the creation of the Region of Iraq in the south as well as he has an influential and leading role of Asa'ib Ahl al-Haq and Supreme Council for the Islamic Revolution in Iraq armed wing.
