= Hussein Ali al-Shaalan =

Iraqi politician and tribal leader

Sheikh Hussein Ali al-Shaalan (d. 2018) was an Iraqi politician. A Shia Arab from Diwaniya, he was elected to the Council of Representatives of Iraq in the Iraqi legislative election of December 2005 from the Iraqi National List coalition.

== Exile ==
He left Iraq in 1991 after the failure of the 1991 uprisings and was granted asylum in Britain. In 2000 he was involved in the formation of the Democratic Centrist Tendency opposition group, and was part of the Follow-Up and Arrangement Committee alliance of opposition groups that was formed in 2003.

== Return to Iraq ==
He returned to Iraq following the 2003 Invasion of Iraq. He was considered an ally of Iyad Allawi. His cousin, Hazim al-Shaalan, was an ally of Ahmad Chalabi and the Defense Minister from 2004-5 in the Iraqi Interim Government.

He was elected to the Council of Representatives of Iraq in January 2005 as part of the Iraqi List and in December 2005 as part of the Iraqi National List.

In December 2010, he became a Minister of State.
