= Malik Dohan al-Hassan =

Iraqi politician (1919–2021)

- مالك دوهان الحسن
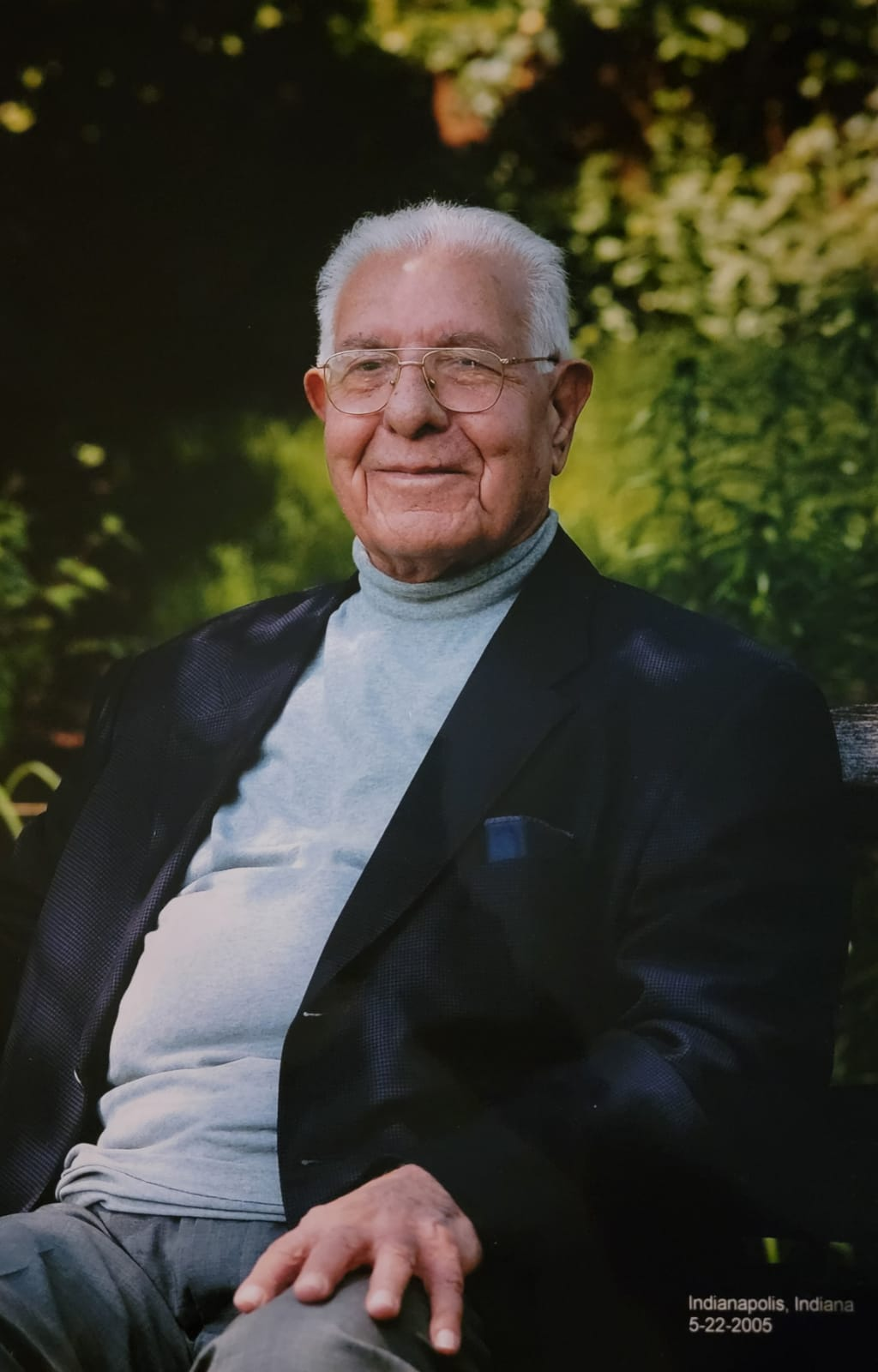
- Al-Hassan in 2005

Minister of Culture and Information
- In office 1967–1968
- Preceded by: Ahmed Matlab
- Succeeded by: Salah Omar Al-Ali

Minister of Justice
- In office June 2004 – May 2005
- Preceded by: Hashim Abdul-Rahman al-Shibli
- Succeeded by: Abdel Hussein Shandal

Personal details
- Born: July 1, 1919 Al-Qasim, Babil, Ottoman Empire (now Iraq)
- Died: May 23, 2021 (aged 101) Amman, Jordan
- Education: LLB – University of Baghdad, 1947; Diploma in Public and Private Law – Montpellier University, 1951; Doctorate in Law – University of Paris 1 Pantheon-Sorbonne, 1957

Malik Dohan al-Hassan (Arabic: مالك دوهان الحسن; 1 July 1919 – 23 May 2021) was an Iraqi politician and academician, who served as Minister of Culture and Information in 1967, headed the Iraqi Bar Association in 2003, and was the Minister of Justice in the Iraqi Interim Government in 2004.

== Early life ==
Al-Hassan was born in al-Hilla, south of Baghdad, in 1919, to a Shi'a Arab family belonging to the Jubur clan, one of the largest clans in Iraq. He graduated from the University of Baghdad in 1947. He continued his studies in France where he received a Diploma in Public and Private Law from Montpellier University and a Doctorate in Law from the Paris 1 Panthéon-Sorbonne University. He then became a Professor of Law at the University of Baghdad. He was elected President of the Al-Mustansiriya University in 1966. He authored seminal books in tort law that were taught in law schools in Iraq.

== Pre-Saddam government ==
He was appointed the Minister of Culture and Information in 1967 by President Abdul Rahman Arif.

== During Saddam government ==
al-Hassan was imprisoned under Saddam Hussein for two years, then interned in Baghdad and was prohibited from travel for ten years. He was permanently banned from practicing politics and holding public office. As a result, al-Hassan practiced private law until the end of the Ba'athist rule over Iraq in 2003.

== Post-Saddam ==
In 2003 he was elected to head the Iraqi Bar Association. He was appointed to a task force looking at compensation for the victims of the Saddam Hussein government. In June 2004 he was appointed as the Minister of Justice in the Iraqi Interim Government. As Minister, he was targeted by a car bomb that killed four people, including his nephew. Responsibility was claimed by Abu Musab al-Zarqawi, head of al-Qaeda in Iraq. He defended the use of the death penalty against former President Saddam Hussein, saying "...we have the right and even the obligation to use the tools that we see useful". Later that year, he threatened to resign unless a judge who had indicted Ahmad Chalabi for murder and money laundering was fired.

== 2005 Iraqi elections ==
He had initially called for the Iraqi legislative election of January 2005 to be postponed as it could "...trigger civil war". He nonetheless took part with the National Democratic Coalition, who only received 9,747 votes. Although he was not elected, he remained a vocal figure in the media and was often asked for his opinion. In February 2007, he criticized the proposed Oil and Gas Law as being too vague.

Political offices
Preceded by Hashim Abdul-Rahman al-Shibli	Justice Minister of Iraq; June 2004 – May 2005	Succeeded by Abdel Hussein Shandal
