= National Democratic Coalition (Iraq) =

The National Democratic Coalition was a political party in Iraq led by Abid Faisal al-Sahlani The party ran in the Iraqi legislative election of January 2005 even though one of their most influential members and the Justice Minister at the time, Malik Dohan al-Hassan, called for the Iraqi legislative election of January 2005 to be postponed as they could "trigger civil war". They only received 9,747 votes.
