= Democratic Centrist Tendency =

Iraqi political party founded in London

The Democratic Centrist Tendency was an Iraqi political party founded in 2000 in London by Iraqi exiles who were opposed to the rule of Saddam Hussein. The group publishes the newspaper Al-Nahdah.

== Supporters ==
The founder members included:

- Secretary-General: Adnan Pachachi, Foreign Minister and UN Ambassador under the 1960s Nationalist government of Abdul Salam Arif
- Deputy Secretary-General: Mahdi al-Hafez, foreign service officer at the UN in Geneva under Saddam Hussein during the 1970s who became Minister of Planning under the Iraqi Governing Council
- Executive Committee Member: Maysoon al-Damluji, Senior Deputy Culture Minister in the Iraqi Governing Council, later Member of Parliament
- Executive Committee Member: Ayham al-Samarie, who became Minister of Electricity in the Iraqi Governing Council
- Executive Committee Member: Feisal al-Istrabadi, legal drafter of the Transitional Administrative Law, appointed Ambassador and Deputy Permanent Representative of Iraq to the UN
- Hussein Ali al-Shaalan

== History ==
It participated in the Follow-Up and Arrangement Committee in the lead up to the 2003 invasion of Iraq. In the 2005 National Assembly legislative election it was part of the Assembly of Independent Democrats, led by Pachachi himself, and was disbanded after the December 2005 elections.
