= Ali bin Hussein =

Ali bin Hussein ('Ali the son of Husayn') is an Arabic name which may refer to:

- Ali ibn Husayn Zayn al-Abidin (658–713), son of Husayn ibn Ali and fourth Shi'a Imam
- Ali al-Asghar ibn Husayn (died 680), youngest son of Husayn ibn Ali
- Ali al-Akbar ibn Husayn (652–680), another son of Husayn ibn Ali
- Ali bin Hussein, King of Hejaz (1879–1935), last Hashemite King of Hejaz and Sharif of Mecca
- Sharif Ali bin al-Hussein (1956–2022), claimant to the throne of Iraq
- Prince Ali bin Hussein of Jordan (born 1975), younger half-brother of King Abdullah II of Jordan
