= Mohammed Abdulkarim al-Kasnazani =

Iraqi Sufi sheikh

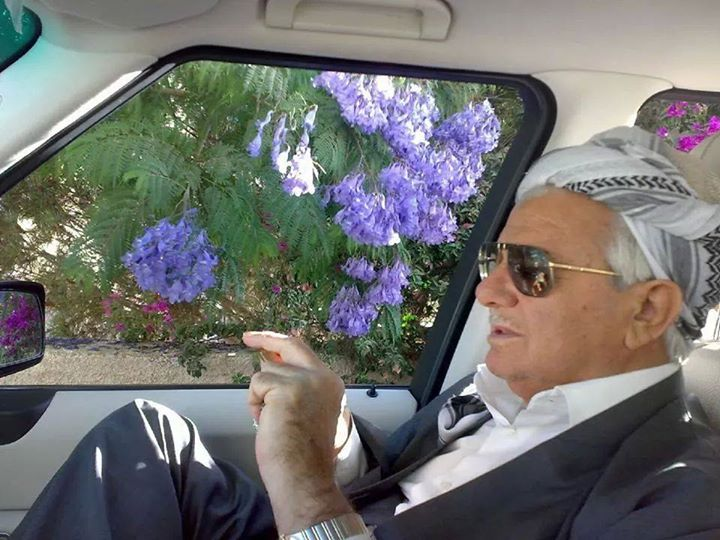
- Born: 15 April 1938; Kirkuk, Iraq
- Died: 4 July 2020 (aged 82); United States
- Occupations: Islamic Scholar, Sheikh of the Kasnazani Sufi Order
- Children: Nahro Mohammed Abdul Kareem Al-Kasnazani, Mulas Mohammed Abdul Kareem Al-Kasnazani, Gandhi Mohammed Abdul Kareem Al-Kasnazani, Junaid Mohammed Abdul Kareem Al-Kasnazani

Mohammed bin Abdul Karim al-Kasnazani al-Husseini (1938 – July 4, 2020) was one of the sheikhs of the Kasnazani Order, formally known as the ‘Aaliyah Qadiriyah Kasnazaniyah Sufi Order. The headquarters of this order is located in Sulaymaniyah Governorate in the Kurdistan Region of Iraq.

The name "Kasnazani" used by the sheikh’s family is a title that was originally given to their ancestor Abdul Karim I. Kasnazan is a word in the Kurdish language that means "unknown" or "no one knows about him." This title was attributed to the sheikh because he isolated himself for four years in the mountains of Qaradagh, a region on the outskirts of Sulaymaniyah whose name means "Black Mountain." When people were asked about the sheikh during his seclusion, they would say "Kasnazan," meaning no one knows. After he returned from the mountain, this title stuck and became the name of the Kasnazani Order that he founded and was passed down to his sons and grandsons who continued leading the order after him.

Thus, "Kasnazani" is both a family title and the name of the Sufi order, with its own etymological and spiritual significance. As for the tribal affiliation of Sheikh Mohammed al-Kasnazani, he belonged to the Barzanji tribe. The tribe traces its ancestry to Sheikh Isa al-Barzanji, who was the first to settle in Barzinjah in northern Iraq.

== Birth and early life ==
Sheikh Muhammad al-Kasnazan al-Husayni was born in the village of Karbajna, which belongs to the subdistrict of Sinquar in Kirkuk Governorate, northern Iraq, at dawn on Friday, the 14th of the month of Safar in the year 1358 AH, corresponding to 15 April 1938 CE. This village where the Sheikh was born is the home of the sheikhs of the Kasnazani Order, and from his early years spent in Karbajna, the Sheikh of the Order was his father, Sheikh Abdul Karim al-Shah al-Kasnazan, who was entrusted with the leadership of the order by his elder brother Sultan Hussein al-Kasnazan, who was and still is referred to as "The Sultan".

Sheikh Muhammad al-Kasnazan received the Sufi path (ṭarīqa) from his father, along with the sciences of Sufism, and he studied religious sciences under scholars at the Karbajna religious school. He studied Arabic and Islamic sciences under its scholars, including Mulla Kaka Hamma Sayf al-Din, Mulla Ali Mustafa (nicknamed Ali Laylan), and Mulla Abdullah Aziz al-Karbajani.

== Religious and Sufi education ==
The Sheikh possessed a scholarly library containing thousands of books and manuscripts. He was a regular visitor to the Manuscript House, the Awqaf Public Library (Baghdad), and the library of the Qadiriyya Shrine. As for the Transmitted Sufi Sciences, he committed himself to studying and researching them, authoring the al-Kasnazan Encyclopedia on the Terminology of the People of Sufism and Gnosis.

== Achievements and foundations ==
Shaykh Muhammad al-Kasnazan founded the University of Shaykh Muhammad al-Kasnazan, which includes, in addition to the Department of Sharia Sciences, Sufism, and Interfaith Dialogue, other departments in economics, politics, law, languages, computer science, and applied mathematics.

He developed an Islamic calendar known as the "Muhammadi Calendar," which presents a scientific thesis based on astronomical calculations, dating events from the birth of the Prophet Muhammad.

He established the Central Council of Sufi Orders in Iraq.

He launched the website of the Qadiriyya Kasnazaniyya Sufi Order, a platform dedicated to the path's methodology, principles, and teachings, serving as a means of communication with the wider world and representing the essence of the order.

In 1415 AH (1994 CE), he founded the International Center for Sufism and Spiritual Studies. The center focuses on researching cases of immediate healing attributed to the miracles and spiritual phenomena of the Kasnazaniyya Order, which aim to demonstrate the existence of the Divine Essence. It also compares these occurrences with parapsychological phenomena, highlighting the latter's limitations, alongside other studies conducted by specialized researchers.

== Death ==
Sheikh Muhammad al-Kasnazani passed away in the United States on July 4, 2020, at the age of 82. After his passing, his son Nehro al-Kasnazani was pledged allegiance to as his successor, following his father's recommendation nearly a quarter of a century earlier that he should be the next spiritual guide of the order.
