= Yelda =

Yelda or Yalda might refer to the Yaldā Night holiday. Yelda and Yalda is also a surname and a female given name. The name may refer to:

== People ==
=== First name ===
- Yalda Hakim (born 1983), Australian journalist
- Yelda Reynaud (born 1972), Turkish-Austrian actress

=== Surname ===
- Albert Edward Ismail Yelda (born 1959), Iraqi diplomat
- Tony Yalda (born 1981), American actor
