= Coalition for Iraqi National Unity =

Coalition for Iraqi National Unity تجمع الوحدة الوطنية العراقي
- Secretary-General: Nehru Mohammed Abdul Karim al-Kasanzani
- Founded: December 12, 1991
- Headquarters: Baghdad, Iraq
- Ideology: Iraqi nationalism; Economic liberalism
- Colors: Blue, Red, White
- Seats in the Council of Representatives of Iraq: 0 / 325
- Seats in the local governorate councils: 0 / 440

Website
- www.cinu-dn.org; Facebook

The Coalition for Iraqi National Unity (CINU) is a political party in Iraq. It is led by Nehru Mohammed Abdul Karim al-Kasanzani.

Nehru Kasanzani's father, Sheikh Mohammed al-Kasanzani is the religious leader of the Kasanzani order, which is the largest order of Sufis in Iraq. Sheikh al-Kasanzani led a pro-government Kurdish militia in the 1970s and 1980s and became an important oil industry middleman in northern Iraq linked to Izzat al-Douri. In 1999 Nehru and his two brothers were arrested and sentenced to death after Nehru's brother forged Saddam Hussein's signature. After the intervention of a Kurdish Communist former minister, the Kasanzanis were released and allowed to flee to the Kurdistan Region, which was outside the control of the Iraqi government at the time. There, the family are reported to have become assets of the CIA, sourcing lists of names of people in security services.

After the invasion of Iraq, al-Kasanzani founded the Iraqi National Unity Coalition. They stood in the January and December 2005 elections as list 552 but failed to win any seats. They did, however, win 5 provincial assembly seats in Salah ad Din in 2005 and won 14,439 votes and two provincial assembly seats in the 2009 Al Anbar governorate election.

In January 2010 the party was banned by the De-Baathification Commission with 14 others for links with the banned Baath Party.
