= Islamic Action Organization In Iraq – Central Command =

The Islamic Action Organization In Iraq – Central Command is one of the electoral coalitions that participated in the January 30, 2005 National Assembly legislative election in Iraq. It is linked with the Islamic Action Organization which ran as a part of the United Iraqi Alliance.

In the 2005 election, the party received 0.73% of the vote, earning two seats in the National Assembly. The list's leader was given as Ala Humud Salih al Tamah.

In the December 2005 elections, they won no seats.
