= Arrai TV =

- Country: Syria
- Headquarters: Damascus, Syria

Programming
- Language: Arabic

Ownership
- Owner: Misha'an al-Juburi

History
- Launched: 2007
- Closed: 4 December 2011

Arrai TV (Arabic: قناة الرأي) was an Arabic-language television station based in Syria. The channel was owned by Misha'an al-Juburi. During the Libyan Civil War in 2011, it was used by overseas Libyans to defend the Gaddafi government, denounce the anti-Gaddafi rebels and to keep morale up of those which had fled Libya since the war. The channel aired a number of audio messages from Gaddafi and his aides when they fled Tripoli. On 15 October 2011, Arrai TV posted a message mourning the death of Khamis Gaddafi on 29 August. The channel closed on 4 December 2011.
