= Free Officers and Civilians Movement =

The Free Officers and Civilians Movement was an Iraqi opposition movement that campaigned against President Saddam Hussein.

It was formed in 1996 from defected Iraqi army officers and led by former Brigadier General Najib al-Salihi. The Movement claimed it could raise 30,000 fighters. Although al-Salihi is a Sunni Arab, he is from the Albu Salih tribe that encompasses Sunni Arabs, Shia Arabs and Turkmen, so claimed to have support from all three groups.

After the 2003 invasion of Iraq, the Movement returned to Iraq. It contested the January 2005 parliamentary elections where it received 6,372 votes.
