= Hashim Abderrahman al-Shibli =

Iraqi politician

Hashim Abderrahman al-Shibli (Arabic:هاشم عبد الرحمن الشبلي Hāshim ‘Abd ar-Raḥmān ash-Shiblī) is an Iraqi politician from Baghdad who was the Iraqi Justice Minister from 2006 to 2007 in the government of Nouri al-Maliki. A Sunni Arab, he was elected to the National Assembly of Iraq in December 2005 on the secular Iraqi National List coalition.

== Biography ==
A lawyer, a Sunni Muslim, and a member of the National Democratic Party, Hashim Abderrahman al-Shibli was appointed Minister of Justice in September 2003. In 2005, he was nominated to the post of Human Rights Minister in the Iraqi Transitional Government which he turned down, saying he wasn't consulted before being nominated. In May 2006, he was appointed Minister of Justice in the Iraqi Governing Council.

Shibli is also the chairman of the government committee charged with implementing the articles of the Constitution of Iraq that relate to Kirkuk's status.

Following the leaking of a videotape of the execution of Saddam Hussein, with the detention on January 3, 2007 of a guard under al-Shibli's ministry, suspicions have arisen that his ministry may have intended to inflame sectarian tensions. He resigned from his post at March 31, 2007, citing political differences with the Prime Minister al-Maliki over the execution of Saddam Hussein and with the Iraqi National List over the future of Kirkuk. However a spokesman for the government said his inability to control abuse at prisons meant he was going to be replaced in a forthcoming reshuffle.

Political offices
Preceded by Coalition Provisional Authority	Minister of Justice; September 2003 – June 2004	Succeeded by Malik Dohan al-Hassan
Preceded by Abdul-Husayn Shandal	Minister of Justice; May 2006 – March 2007	Succeeded by Safa al-Safi
