= National Independent Cadres and Elites =

Iraqi political party

- Leader: Fatah al-Sheikh
- Religion: Shia Islam

The National Independent Cadres and Elites (NICE) is an Iraqi political party representing Shi'ite Iraqis who do not support the approach of the United Iraqi Alliance. It is closely associated with the movement of Muqtada al-Sadr and the Mahdi Army. The party is led by newspaper editor Fatah al-Sheikh.

== Electoral history ==
=== January 2005 Iraqi parliamentary elections ===
In the 2005 Iraqi elections, NICE received just under 70,000 votes, about 0.8% of those cast, earning them three seats in the transitional National Assembly of Iraq.

=== December 2005 Iraqi parliamentary elections ===
NICE did not contest the elections for the December 2005 Iraqi parliamentary election. Many of Sadr's supporters were part of the United Iraqi Alliance list.
