= Iraq Assembly of National Unity =

The Iraq Assembly of National Unity is one of the electoral coalitions that participated in the January 30, 2005 National Assembly legislative election in Iraq. They were led by Dr. Nehro Mohammed.

In the 2005 election, the party received 23,686 votes, or 0.28% of the total ballot.
