= Iraqi National Salvation Party =

The Iraq National Salvation Party is one of the parties that participated in the January 30, 2005 National Assembly legislative election in Iraq.

Ezzedin al-Majid was the secretary general of the Iraqi National Salvation Party.

In the 2005 election, the party received 496 votes, or 0.0058% of the ballot. Ignoring independent Ghalib Muhsin Abd Hussein Al-Sabahi, they received the fewest votes among any party.
