= Iraqi Republican Assembly =

Political party in Iraq

The Iraqi Republican Assembly is an Iraqi political party. English-language sources have also referred to it as the Iraqi Republican Gathering, while the English-language results for the January 2005 Iraqi National Assembly election listed it as the Iraqi Republican Group. The party has been led by Saad Asim al-Janabi, who has been described in reporting as its head and secretary-general.

== History ==
During the campaign for Iraq's January 2005 elections, the party was active in Kirkuk and Tamim Governorate, where its local candidates argued against incorporating the city into Iraqi Kurdistan and urged Sunni Arab voters to take part in the provincial poll. Contemporary reporting described it as a Sunni Arab party, and a later history of Kirkuk noted that its campaign used the slogan "Kirkuk for all Iraqis". Official results for the National Assembly election recorded list 299, the Iraqi Republican Group, with 6,477 votes in Tamim Governorate. The list did not win a seat in the 275-member assembly.

The party remained active after the 2005 election. In April 2009, al-Janabi condemned attacks on Christians in Kirkuk and called on Arabs, Kurds, Turkmen and Chaldo-Assyrians in the province to unite against outside interference. In 2012, he called for legislation to be kept free of sectarian and partisan bargaining, and later welcomed the setting of a date for the 2013 provincial council elections.

Ahead of Iraq's October 2021 parliamentary election, Asharq Al-Awsat listed the Iraqi Republican Gathering of Saad Asim al-Janabi among the parties that said they would not take part. In May 2025, Shafaq News reported that the party had joined the Alternative Coalition ahead of the 11 November 2025 parliamentary election.
