= Nehro Mohammed =

Iraqi Sufi sheikh and politician (born 1969)

Nehro Mohammed Abdul-Karim al-Kasnazani (Arabic: نهرو محمد عبد الكريم الكسنزاني, romanized: ʿNahrū Muḥammad ʻAbd al-Karīm alksnzāny) is the current spiritual leader (Sheikh and guide) of the al-Qadiriyya al-Kasnazaniyya Sufi Order and an Iraqi politician. He was born on 12 December 1969, and holds a PhD in history, an academic qualification in English language studies from the United Kingdom, as well as a degree in computer science from Al Mansour University College in Baghdad. Nahro al-Kasnazani comes from a family with a long-standing Sufi religious background based in Iraqi Kurdistan. He descends from the al-Barzanji family, who trace their lineage back to Imam Husayn, hence their Husayni descent. His spiritual affiliation is with the al-Qadiriyya al-Kasnazaniyya Order.

Nahro al-Kasnazani was also an Iraqi politician who led the Iraq Assembly of National Unity (now the Coalition for Iraqi National Unity) electoral coalition. He was one of the few politicians from the Sunni Arab community to participate in the Iraqi legislative election of January 2005. The slate put up 275 candidates but won no seats. . He is the Sheikh of the Al-Aliyyah Al-Qadiriyyah Al-Kasnazaniyyah.

== Early life and succession as sheikh ==
Nahro Muhammad Abdul Karim al-Kasnazani al-Husseini was born on December 12, 1969, in Kirkuk, northern Iraq. His family moved to Baghdad in 1985, where he completed his primary education. He is the eldest among his siblings. His father, Sheikh Muhammad Abdul Karim al-Kasnazani al-Husseini, was the previous Sheikh of the Al-Qadiriyya al-Kasnazaniyya Sufi Order. After the death of Sheikh Muhammad Abdul Karim al-Kasnazani, Dr. Nahro succeeded him as the Sheikh, as his father had entrusted him to lead the order.

=== Selection as sheikh after his father’s death ===
Initially, Sheikh Muhammad al-Kasnazani always recommended Dr. Nahro as his successor to the other disciples and said, "No successor should open a khanqah or appoint a new successor without informing my successor, Sheikh Nahro." In 2005, in front of a gathering of followers, he officially declared Dr. Nahro as his successor, saying, "Inshallah, Sheikh Nahro is the Sheikh of the future, and he is your Sheikh, brother, and servant, and the servant of the order." and He mentioned this in one of his lectures.In 2008, Sheikh Muhammad al-Kasnazani formally gave Dr. Nahro full authority over the main khanqah in Sulaymaniyah, stating that any guidance from Dr. Nahro would be as though it came from him, and no one after Sheikh Muhammad al-Kasnazani would represent the order except for Sheikh Nahro. According to their beliefs, the selection of the Sheikh is made by the command of the Islamic prophet Muhammad. In 2019, Sheikh Muhammad al-Kasnazani traveled to the United States, and in 2020, his health gradually deteriorated until his passing on July 4, 2020. After his death, Sheikh Nahro assumed the leadership of the order.

== Political career ==
Sheikh Nahro is also an Iraqi political leader who believes in a free and unified Iraq. During the rule of former President Saddam Hussein, Sheikh Nahro and members of his family were imprisoned. In 1991, he founded a political party named the "Iraq Assembly of National Unity." Sheikh Nahro has participated in various conferences, including the Defense Conference held in Dubai in 2008 and the Reform Conference held in 2005.

== Education and academic qualifications ==
Nahro completed his secondary education in Baghdad and earned a Bachelor's degree in computer science from the University of Baghdad. He also obtained a bachelor's degree in English language studies from the United Kingdom. He later received a master's degree in history from the Institute of Arab History and Scientific Heritage, followed by a PhD in Islamic history. The title of his doctoral dissertation was "Mehmed the Conqueror: His Life and Conquests." Dr. Nahro is fluent in three languages: Arabic, English, and Kurdish.

== Media activities ==
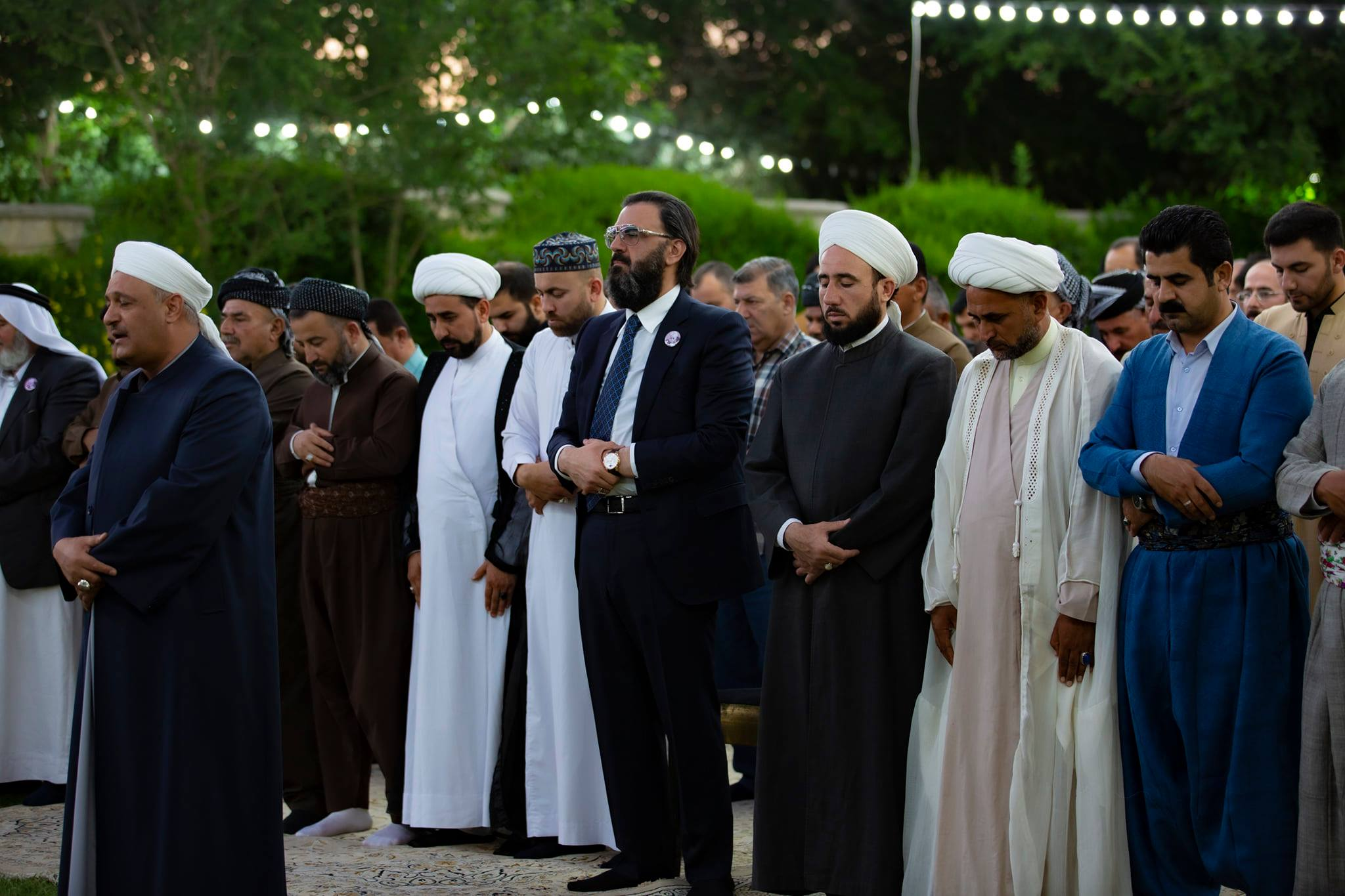
The unified prayer gathering Sunnis and Shi'as as well as other sects at the Kasnazani tekke in Sulaymaniyah, Kurdistan Region of Iraq.

Sheikh Nahro believes that media plays a vital role in solidifying essential ideas and principles, which contributes to the happiness and development of society. Therefore, he established several media and cultural institutions, including:

- Al-Mashriq Media and Cultural Foundation, which publishes Al-Mashriq newspaper.
- Al-Mashriq Printing Press, which prints newspapers and cultural books.
- Al-Ufuq Newspaper, an independent political newspaper focusing on political, social, and cultural affairs in Iraq.
- Iraq Newspaper, a political and cultural Iraqi publication.
- Launching the independent Al-Mashriq Satellite Channel.
- Initiating the Dialogue Initiative, aiming to build bridges of communication and cooperation among people and communities.
- Establishing the official website for the Kasnazani Qadiriyya Sufi Order.
- Founding the Kasnazani Cultural Council, chaired and supervised by Dr. Nahro.
- Founding a university college under the name Al-Salam University College.
- Establishing the International Center for Sufism and Spiritual Studies in Baghdad in 1994.
- Founding the Scientific Assembly of Sayyid Nobles in Baghdad in 2004.
- The Central Council of Sufi Orders in Baghdad in 2004.
- Establishing the Iraqi Relief Association.

=== Publications ===
Some of his written works include:

- "Clusters of Visions" (عناقيد الرؤى)
- "Adorning Oneself with Islamic Manners in the Kasnazani Path" (التحلي بالآداب الإسلامية في الطريقة الكسنزانية)
- "Healing Miracles: Sufism and Modern Medicine" (خوارق الشفاء الصوفي والطب الحديث)
- "Visions and Dreams from a Sufi Perspective" (الرؤى والأحلام في المنظور الصوفي)
- "Sultan Mehmed the Conqueror: His Life and Conquests" (السلطان محمد الفاتح، حياته وفتوحاته)
- "Iraq: Steps Toward Correcting the Path" (العراق خطى على درب تصحيح المسار)
- "Kasnazani Magazine" (مجلة الكسنزان)
