= Abdul Karim Abtan =

Iraqi politician

Minister of Education
- Incumbent
- Assumed office 14 May 2026
- President: Nizar Amidi
- Prime Minister: Ali al-Zaidi

Abdul Karim Ali Abtan Dahash al-Jubouri (born 1959; Arabic: عبد الكريم علي عبطان دهش الجبوري) is an Iraqi politician who served as a member of the Council of Representatives for two parliamentary terms. He has served as Minister of Education in the Ali Faleh al-Zaidi government since 14 May 2026.

== Biography ==
Abdul Karim Abtan was born in 1959 in the Iraqi capital, Baghdad. He holds a bachelor's degree in law and was elected as a member of the Council of Representatives of Iraq for two parliamentary terms. He previously served as deputy chairman of the parliament's Legal Committee.

Abdul Karim is considered one of the tribal sheikhs and prominent figures of the Jubur tribe. Most of his public service and social activities are concentrated in Baghdad, particularly in the city's Karkh district, including the areas of Al-Dora and Al-Saydiya.
