= Kasnazani =

Sufi order

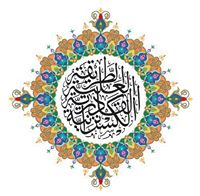
Kasnazani order(Tariqah)

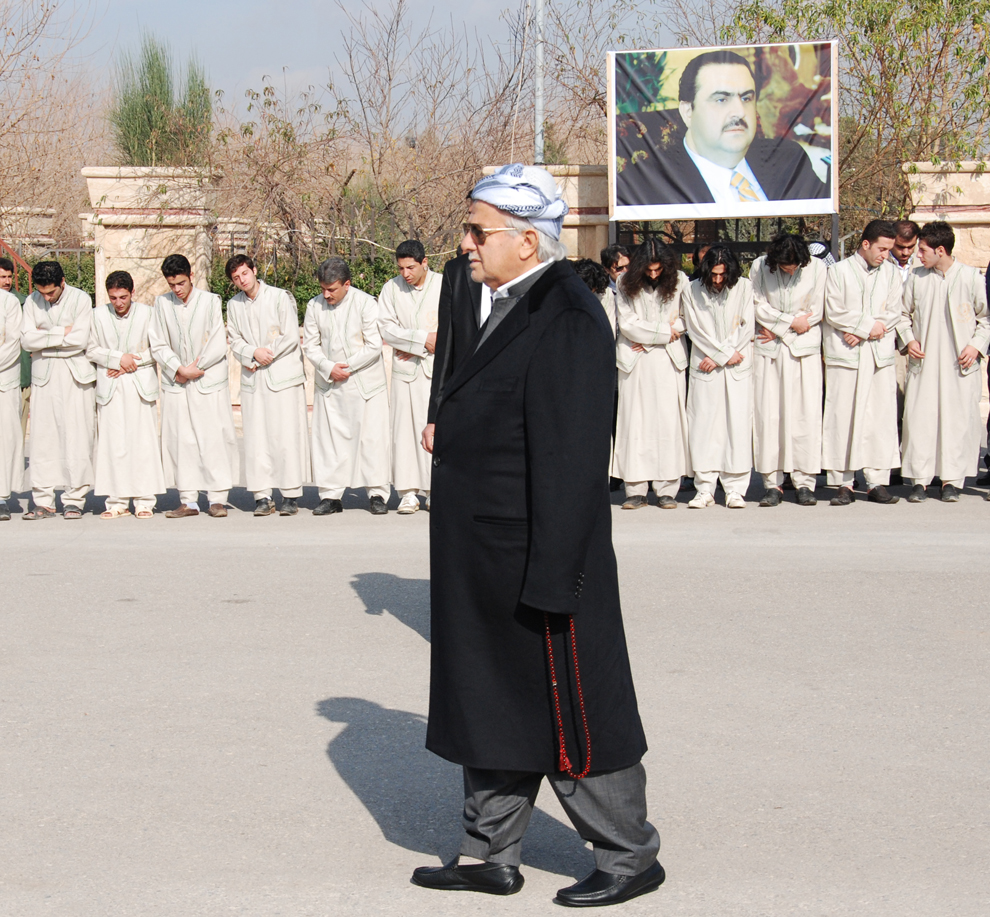
Shaikh Muhammad al-Kasnazani, the previous leader of the order

At-Tariqah Al-Aliyyah Al-Qadiriyyah Al-Kasnazaniyyah (Arabic: Arabic: العلية القادرية الكسنزانية, shortly known as Kasnazani - Arabic: Arabic: كسنزني and occasionally as Al-Kasnazani Arabic: الكسنزاني, Kurdish: کەسنەزانی) is a Sufi order popular in Iraq and Iran, and a sub-order of the Qadiri order. It is the largest tariqah in Iraq, and is spread widely across neighbouring countries. Its spiritual lineage to the Islamic Prophet Muhammad passes through his cousin and son-in-law Ali Ibn Abi Talib. The present spiritual master of the Kasnazani order is As Sayyed As Shaikh Nehro Abdul Kareem Al-Kasnazani Al-Qadiri Al-Hussaini, a descendant of the Islamic Prophet Muhammad through the lineage of his grandson Imam Husain ibn Ali. The Kasnazani order makes no distinction between Sunni and Shia followers.

== Etymology ==
The name of the Al-Qadiriyya Al-Kasnazaniyya Order derives from multiple roots: "Al-'Aliyya" refers to Ali ibn abi talib, while "Qadiriyya" refers to Sheikh Abdul Qadir al-Gilani. The term "Kasnazaniyya" is of Kurdish origin and means "no one knows its reality." It was first given as a title to the family of the Order after their ancestor, Abdul Karim, was called by this name due to his seclusion for four years in one of the mountains of Qara Dagh, near the city of Sulaymaniyah. When people asked about him during that time, they were simply told "Kasnazan." After his return, the name remained and became associated with this Sufi path, which was adopted by Abdul Karim, his sons, and their descendants.

The family of Kasnazan belongs to the Barzinji tribe, whose upper lineage goes back to Sheikh Isa al-Barzinji, the first to settle in Barzinjah in northern Iraq.

== Practices ==
Followers of the order perform certain spiritual practices that are believed to manifest miraculous abilities. These include acts such as walking on fire or piercing various parts of the body—such as the cheeks or arms—with sharp instruments, conducted under the direct supervision and guidance of the order's sheikhs. Adherents believe that these acts are not for public display or spectacle, but are seen as a continuation of prophetic miracles, aiming to affirm the presence and oneness of God and to guide hearts toward faith.

The sheikhs of the order emphasize that such practices are only carried out under specific conditions and with their explicit permission. They are strictly prohibited for purposes of self-glorification and must only be used in the context of spiritual guidance when deemed necessary. The decision to engage in these practices is either made by the sheikh during his presence or by the disciple himself when he perceives that their use would enhance the impact of the guidance being offered.

The order also maintains its own set of spiritual litanies (awrad) and distinctive forms of dhikr (remembrance), which, like in other Sufi traditions, are intended for inner purification and spiritual striving. Public demonstrations of extraordinary feats have been officially suspended by order of the current sheikh, Sheikh Shams al-Din Muhammad al-Kasnazani, who emphasized that in the current era, spiritual guidance is better delivered through kind words and gentle admonition.

== Spiritual hierarchy of the Kasnazani Order ==
In the Kasnazani order, the highest rank is the Sheikh of the Order, currently held by Sheikh Nehru Muhammad Abdul Karim al-Kasnazani who succeeded his father, Sheikh Muhammad Abdul Karim al-Kasnazani, after his death. Below him is the rank of the general deputy (al-Wakeel al-'Aam). Following that is the rank of Khalifa. The Khulafa are murids (disciples) who have been authorized to establish and manage tekke (houses of remembrance). After them is the rank of Murshid, whose role is to go outside the tekke and guide people toward the spiritual centers (tekaya).

== The spiritual lineage of the Kasnazani Sufi Order ==
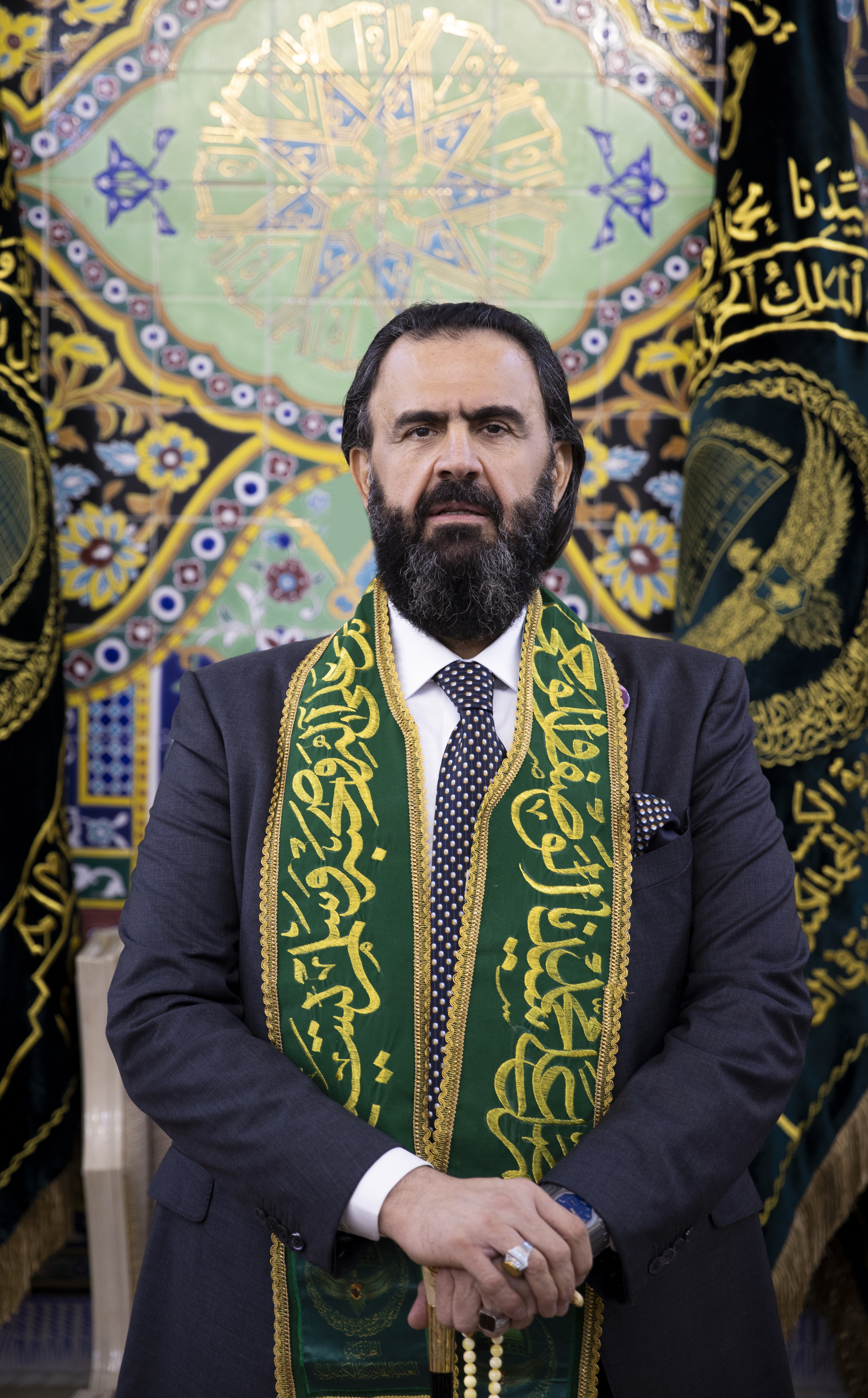
The current Sheikh of the order is Sheikh Nehro Muhammad Abdul Karim al-Kasnazani.

According to their beliefs, this spiritual path was revealed to the Prophet Muhammad, then passed to Imam Ali based on the Prophet's saying : "Whoever I am his master, Ali is his master. O Allah, befriend whoever befriends him and oppose whoever opposes him." And the saying: "I am the city of knowledge and Ali is its gate." From him, the lineage of the spiritual chain branches into two wings.

First Wing (The Golden Chain)
Imam Ali ibn Abi Talib
Imam Husayn ibn Ali
Imam Ali Zayn al-Abidin
Imam Muhammad al-Baqir
Imam Ja'far al-Sadiq
Imam Musa al-Kadhim
Imam Ali al-Ridha
Sheikh Ma'ruf al-Karkhi

To the second wing:

Second Wing
Sheikh Hasan al-Basri
Sheikh Habib al-Ajami
Sheikh Dawud al-Tai
Sheikh Ma'ruf al-Karkhi
Sheikh Sari al-Saqati
Sheikh Junayd of Baghdad
Sheikh Abu Bakr al-Shibli
Sheikh Abdul Wahid al-Yamani
Sheikh Abu Faraj al-Tartusi
Sheikh Ali al-Hakkari
Sheikh Abu Sa'id al-Makhzumi
Sheikh Abdul Qadir al-Gilani
Sheikh Abdul Razzaq al-Gilani
Sheikh Dawud II
Sheikh Muhammad Gharib II
Sheikh Abdul Fattah al-Sayyah
Sheikh Muhammad Qasim
Sheikh Muhammad Sadiq
Sheikh Hussein al-Basra'i
Sheikh Ahmad al-Ahsa'i
Sheikh Ismail al-Wiliani
Sheikh Muhyiddin of Kirkuk
Sheikh Abdul Samad Kalleh Zardeh
Sheikh Hussein Kazan Qaya
Sheikh Abdul Qadir Kazan Qaya
Sheikh Abdul Karim Shah al-Kasnazani
Sheikh Sultan Hussein al-Kasnazan
Sheikh Abdul Karim al-Kasnazani
Sheikh Muhammad Abdul Karim al-Kasnazani
Sheikh Shams al-Din Muhammad Nehru al-Kasnazan
