= Albert Edward Ismail Yelda =

Albert Edward Ismail Yelda (Syriac: ܐܠܒܪܬ ܐܕܘܪܕ ܐܝܣܡܥܝܠ ܝܠܕܐ) (born 1959 Ramadi, Iraq) was Iraq's ambassador to the Vatican. Yelda, an ethnic Assyrian, belongs to the Ancient Church of the East. Prior to the United States-led 2003 invasion of Iraq, Yelda dedicated himself to the legal counsel and assistance projects for the Iraqi immigrants in London, England from 1987 until 2003, when he returned to Iraq.

During his time in London, Yelda co-founded the anti-Baath organization the Iraqi Liberation Coalition with friend Ayad Allawi.

In early 2004, he was appointed as Iraq's 14th new ambassador to the Vatican. In November 2004, Yelda met with Pope John Paul II and talked about the situation of the Christian minority in Iraq.

Yelda has met twice with Pope Benedict XVI, once in a visit on May 12, 2005, in the Vatican and on September 25, 2006, when he joined other diplomats from the Arab League and other Muslim countries to find peace after the Pope's controversial comments, which has led to further persecution of Iraq's Christian minority.

In 2007 he was awarded Knight Grand Cross of the Order of Pius IX.
