= Sharif Ali bin al-Hussein =

Iraqi royal and politician (1956–2022)

Sharif Ali bin al-Hussein الشريف علي بن الحسين
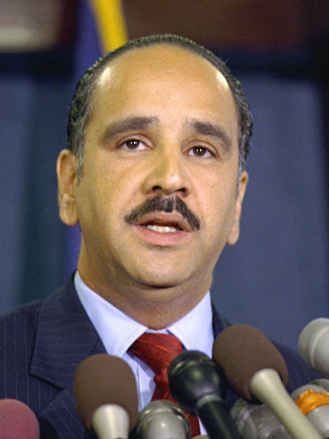
- Ali Bin Al-Hussein in 2002
- Monarch: Faisal II

Personal details
- Born: 1956 Baghdad, Iraq
- Died: 14 March 2022 (aged 65) Amman, Jordan
- Parents: Sharif Al-Hussein bin Ali (father); Badiya bint Ali (mother)
- Known for: Claiming to be the last legitimate heir to the position of king of Iraq

Sharif Ali bin al-Hussein (Arabic: الشريف علي بن الحسين; 1956 – 14 March 2022) was the leader of the Iraqi Constitutional Monarchy political party and claimed to be the legitimate heir to the position of King of Iraq, based on his relationship to the last monarch, the late King Faisal II. Born in Baghdad, Ali was raised in Lebanon and Britain after the 1958 coup d'état that overthrew the Hashemite monarchy in Iraq. Before entering politics, he worked as an investment banker in London.

== Early life ==
After the loss of Mecca, Sharif Ali's parents settled in Iraq where his mother Badiya's sister, Aliya bint Ali, was queen consort. He was born in Iraq and his maternal first cousin was Faisal II of Iraq, the last king of Iraq, his maternal grandfather was Ali bin Hussein, last King of Hejaz, and his paternal grandfather was the uncle of both Faisal I of Iraq and Ali bin Hussein. 'Abd al-Ilah was his uncle.

On 14 July 1958, when Colonel Abdul Karim Qassim took control of the Kingdom of Iraq by a coup d'état, the royal family was ordered to leave the palace in Baghdad: King Faisal II; Crown Prince 'Abd al-Ilah; Princess Hiyam, Abdul Ilah's wife; Princess Nafissa, Abdul Ilah's mother; Princess Abdiya, the king's maternal aunt; and several servants. When they all arrived in the courtyard, they were told to turn towards the palace wall, and they were all shot down by Captain Abdus Sattar As Sab', a member of the coup led by Colonel Abd al-Karim Qasim. Nuri as-Said, the Prime Minister of the Kingdom of Iraq, was killed by supporters of Colonel Abd al-Karim Qasim on 15 July 1958.

Ali bin al-Hussein's mother Princess Badia (1920-2020), her husband Sharif al-Hussein bin Ali, and their three children spent a month in the embassy of Saudi Arabia in Baghdad. The coup leaders insisted that they leave Iraq and travel to Egypt on ordinary passports. They lived for a while in Lebanon and finally in London, where Ali bin al-Hussein built up a successful career in investment banking.

== Education ==
Ali bin al-Hussein earned his high school diploma from Brummana High School in Lebanon, a BA in Economics from the Trent Polytechnic Nottingham, and an MA in Economics from the University of Essex.

== Political movement ==
Ali bin Al-Hussein remained an opponent of the rule of Iraqi dictator Saddam Hussein. In 1991, he quit his job managing investment funds and became a member of the Iraqi National Congress, which had the purpose of fomenting the overthrow of Hussein.

After the 2003 invasion of Iraq, Ali returned to the country and lead the Constitutional Monarchy Movement, a member of the Iraqi National Congress. He argued that a constitutional monarch could serve as an arbiter or intermediary to protect constitution and individual rights rather than an executive ruler.

On 28 October 2003, representing the Iraqi National Conference Bloc, Sharif Ali Bin al-Hussein met Syria's Foreign Minister Farouk al-Sharaa in Damascus. They agreed on viewpoints that included ending the occupation and forming an Iraqi government in a way that both satisfied the Iraqi people's aspirations and maintained Iraqi unity.

He had close ties to the Gulf Cooperation Council (GCC) countries.

== Death ==
Sharif Ali died in Amman, Jordan on 14 March 2022, at the age of 65. He is survived by his son Faisal and two daughters.

== Awards ==
- He was awarded the Royal Order of the Drum by the late Kigeli V, the former King of Rwanda, for his goal of establishing a way out of Iraq's political crisis and of ending the tragic ordeal of a people who lived under terror and tyranny.

== Quotes ==
- "It would have been the perfect transition from dictatorship to democracy," he said. "It would have been a way to unite the country around a figure whose history transcended sect and ethnicity." In 2003, Sharif Ali bin al-Hussein said, he pressed American officials to bring him in as soon as Saddam Hussein fell.
- "I don't believe there is a military solution right now in Iraq for either side, for the Americans or the insurgents," he said. "We must start with negotiations."
- "There is no risk of a breakup of Iraq. There is no risk of a civil war."

== See also ==
- List of Kings of Iraq
- Kingdom of Iraq
- History of Iraq
