= Misha'an al-Juburi =

Iraqi politician

Mish'an Al-Jabouri
- مشعان الجبوري

Member of the Council of Representatives
- In office January 2005 – 2006

Governor of Ninawa
- In office March 2003 – May 2003
- Appointed by: Self appointed
- Preceded by: Abdul-Wahid Shannan ar-Ribat
- Succeeded by: Herro Mustafa

Personal details
- Born: 1 August 1957 (age 69) Al-Shirqat, Iraq
- Citizenship: Syria
- Party: Al-Arabiya Coalition (2014–present)
- Other political affiliations: Ba'ath Party (?–?); Reconciliation and Liberation Bloc (1995–2008)
- Spouse
- Children: Yazan Al-Jibouri, Deraa Al-Jibouri, Ribal Al-Jibouri, Hawazen Al-Jibouri, Mayazin Al-Jibouri, Lujain Al-Jibouri, Haneen Al-Jibouri, Shajan Al-Jibouri, Sunan Al-Jibouri, Munan Al-Jibouri, Sham Al-Jibouri
- Occupation: Politician, businessman, journalist

Misha'an al-Juburi (Arabic: مشعان الجبوري; born 1 August 1955) is an Iraqi politician from the Sunni Arab community and member of Al-Arabiya Coalition. He also was the head of Reconciliation and Liberation Bloc, which held three seats in the Iraqi Council of Representatives from 2005 to 2010. Juburi is the publisher of the al-Itijah al-Akhar newspaper and the owner of the Syrian-based Arrai TV. He is a leader of the Jiburi clan, which is powerful in Salah ad Din Governorate. As of 2016, he is a senior member of a parliamentary committee investigating official corruption.

== Role under Saddam ==
Al-Juburi was born in 1955 in the town of Al-Shirqat, located between Tikrit and Mosul. His father was a junior leader of a branch of the powerful Juburi Clan.

In an interview in 1995, Juburi said the President met him in 1975 and gave him cash, a car and facilitated him becoming a journalist, buying his loyalty and admiration. During the Iran–Iraq War, he helped Saddam recruit 50,000 Juburi people to form the Special Republican Guard and Republican Guard. He said he became an "intimate friend" of Uday Hussein and "enjoyed the pleasures of Baghdad".

In the late 1980s, his young son died, and he went on television to criticise the hospital as incompetent, which resulted in him being jailed. After he was released he moved away from politics towards business, exporting wool from Saladin Governorate to Britain.

In 1989, he started planning a coup against the President. The coup was planned for Army Day in 1990 but was discovered before it could take place. Juburi was the only plotter to survive as he was outside the country at the time. The Juburis tried to assassinate him twice more, in 1991 by bombing a house he was staying in and in 1992 when Juburi's brother plotted to decapitate him. It has also been alleged that although Juburi's brother was involved, Juburi himself was not involved in the coup attempt. Instead, his critics have suggested that he fled Iraq after stealing large sums of money from Uday Hussein, his former business partner.

== Exile under Saddam ==
After the coup attempt, Juburi relocated to Syria. Saddam Hussein killed almost 100 members of Juburi's family in retaliation including his brother and brother-in-law.

He founded the Iraqi Homeland Party in Syria and published a newspaper called the "Other Direction". He is a relative of the Iraqi Ambassador to Tunisia, Hamid al-Jabouri, who defected and sought political asylum in Britain in 1993.

He was a member of the Follow-Up and Arrangement Committee grouping of Iraqi exiles.

== Post-invasion ==
During the U.S.-led invasion of Iraq, Juburi took control of the city of Mosul with the aid of Kurdish Peshmerga, and took over a former palace owned by Ali Hassan al-Majid. Juburi and KDP peshmerga forces had been the first to enter Mosul, and Juburi had played a key role in convincing the Commanders of the Iraqi Army's V Corps to surrender, instead of fighting the American and KDP forces. He proceeded to appoint himself Governor, apparently with the support of Barzani. Following his self-appointment, a popular uprising brought locals to the street. Locals were angry at Juburi over a mixture of old allegations that he had stolen money from Saddam and newer allegations that he was involved in looting in Mosul following the takeover. American troops then intervened, ending Juburi's Governorship to end the tension. He was recognised as a powerbroker during the selection of the first Mosul City Council in May 2003.

His party, the Reconciliation and Liberation Bloc stood in the Iraqi legislative election of January 2005 where it won one seat. In the subsequent December elections, it increased its representation three seats. Juburi said they supported the Iraqi insurgency, although opposed suicide bombings, and called for the Multinational Force in Iraq to be replaced by United Nations-led peacekeepers.

In 2005, al-Juburi was backed by the Sunni Arab dialogue council as their candidate for speaker of the Iraqi National Assembly, but he was vetoed by the United Iraqi Alliance due to his links with Uday Hussein.

Juburi was among the minority of Sunni Arabs who supported the Constitution of Iraq in the referendum.

Juburi was indicted in December 2005 with the theft of millions of dollars of government money intended to protect oil pipelines near Kirkuk against attack. The money had been given to him in 2004. He was accused by Iraqi officials of diverting the money towards the Iraqi insurgency, although this hasn't been proved. Following the indictment, he fled to Syria.

In exile he founded Al-Zawraa TV, a twenty-four-hour satellite channel broadcast by the Arabsat satellite to an area that included the Middle East and North Africa. The station's transmissions on the Egyptian-owned Nilesat satellite network ceased in February 2007. Al-Zawraa has broadcast songs eulogising Iraqi victims of "the American occupiers", has described the Iraqi insurgency as "freedom fighters" and the Shi'ite leader Muqtada al-Sadr as a "gangster".

In an interview following the execution of the former Iraqi President Saddam Hussein, he described Hussein as a brave martyr, and said the ones who killed him were like those who killed the second Caliph of Islam, Umar.

On January 9, 2008, al-Juburi was sanctioned by the U.S. Department of the Treasury under Executive Order 13438 "for providing financial, material, and technical support for acts of violence that threaten the peace and stability of Iraq," placing him on Office of Foreign Assets Control's SDN List.

In 2009, he offered on TV to buy weapons to give to the resistance to fight the U.S.-led Multi-National Force – Iraq. He said he wanted to obtain medium-range missiles so they could attack and leave before the forces traced the site.

In 2010, he criticized Gulf governments and TV companies for broadcasting anti-Shi'ite statements from an Egyptian cleric, Muhammed al-Zoghbi. Zoghbi had called for Shi'ites to be purged from Muslim countries and called on Allah to inflict them with cancer and freeze the blood in their veins. Juburi called the cleric a liar and a lunatic and called for him to be banned from TV.

During the 2011 Libyan civil war, he went on TV to say he supported Libyan leader Muammar Gaddafi, saying protests should focus on pro-American governments. His channel Arrai TV has been used by overseas Libyans to defend the Gaddafi regime and denounce the replacement government and to keep morale up of those who have fled Libya since the revolution. The channel has aired a number of audio messages from Gaddafi and his aides since they fled Tripoli. Juburi has justified his support for Gaddafi, and Gaddafi loyalists, by arguing that the fight in Libya is now between native Libyans and foreign invaders. Juburi has instead suggested that Gaddafi loyalists adopt the tactics and strategy of the insurgents in Iraq.

== Corruption ==
In an interview with The Guardian Middle East editor Martin Chulov, Misha'an admitted that despite being a senior member of a parliamentary committee investigating official corruption, he was himself highly corrupt. "There is no solution. Everybody is corrupt, from the top of society to the bottom. Everyone. Including me. At least I am honest about it. I was offered $5M by someone to stop investigating him. I took it, and continued prosecuting him anyway."
