= Reconciliation and Liberation Bloc =

- Leader: Misha'an al-Juburi
- Founded: 1995
- Dissolved: 23 April 2008
- Merged into: Iraqi Arab Gathering
- Headquarters: Iraq
- Ideology: Arab nationalism Iraqi nationalism Secularism

The Reconciliation and Liberation Bloc or Kutla al-Musalaha wa't-Tahrir was an Iraqi political party. The Sunni, liberal, and secularist party was founded as the Iraqi Homeland Party in Jordan in 1995 by exiles from Saddam's regime. A prominent member was Saddam's son-in-law Hussein Kamel al-Majid. The party is closely linked to the powerful Juburi tribe and its current head is Mish'an al-Juburi. The party is also supported by former Ba'athists and the party has pushed for the reintegration of members of the old regime. Unlike many Sunni parties it decided not to boycott the January 2005 Iraqi election. In the voting it received some 31,000 votes, enough for one seat in the legislature. During the subsequent December elections, it increased its representation to 3 seats.

On April 23, 2008 the party merged with the al-Wattan party to form the Iraqi Arab Gathering, which is led by Abdul Karim Abtan al-Jubouri and is a member of the Iraqi National Movement.
