= Iraqi List =

Iraqi List القائمة العراقية
- Founder: Iyad Allawi
- Founded: January 2005
- Dissolved: December 2005
- Ideology: Secularism; Faction: Progressivism; Liberalism

The Iraqi List (Arabic: القائمة العراقية) was a political party list that participated in the January 2005 Iraqi parliamentary elections, consisting of mainly secular Shia Iraqis. It was dominated by the Iraqi National Accord led by former exile and interim prime minister Iyad Allawi.

Other members include the Council of Iraq's Notables, the Iraqi Democrats Movement, the Democratic National Awakening Party, the Loyalty to Iraq Grouping, and the Iraqi Independents Association - all of which are much smaller.

In 2005 Iraqi election the Iraqi List received 13.82% of the votes, earning them 40 seats in the transitional National Assembly of Iraq.

Prior to the December 2005 elections, the list merged with several other parties to form the Iraqi National List.

== External list ==
- Iraqi List official website (archived)
