= Aiham Alsammarae =

Iraqi politician

- أيهم السامرائي
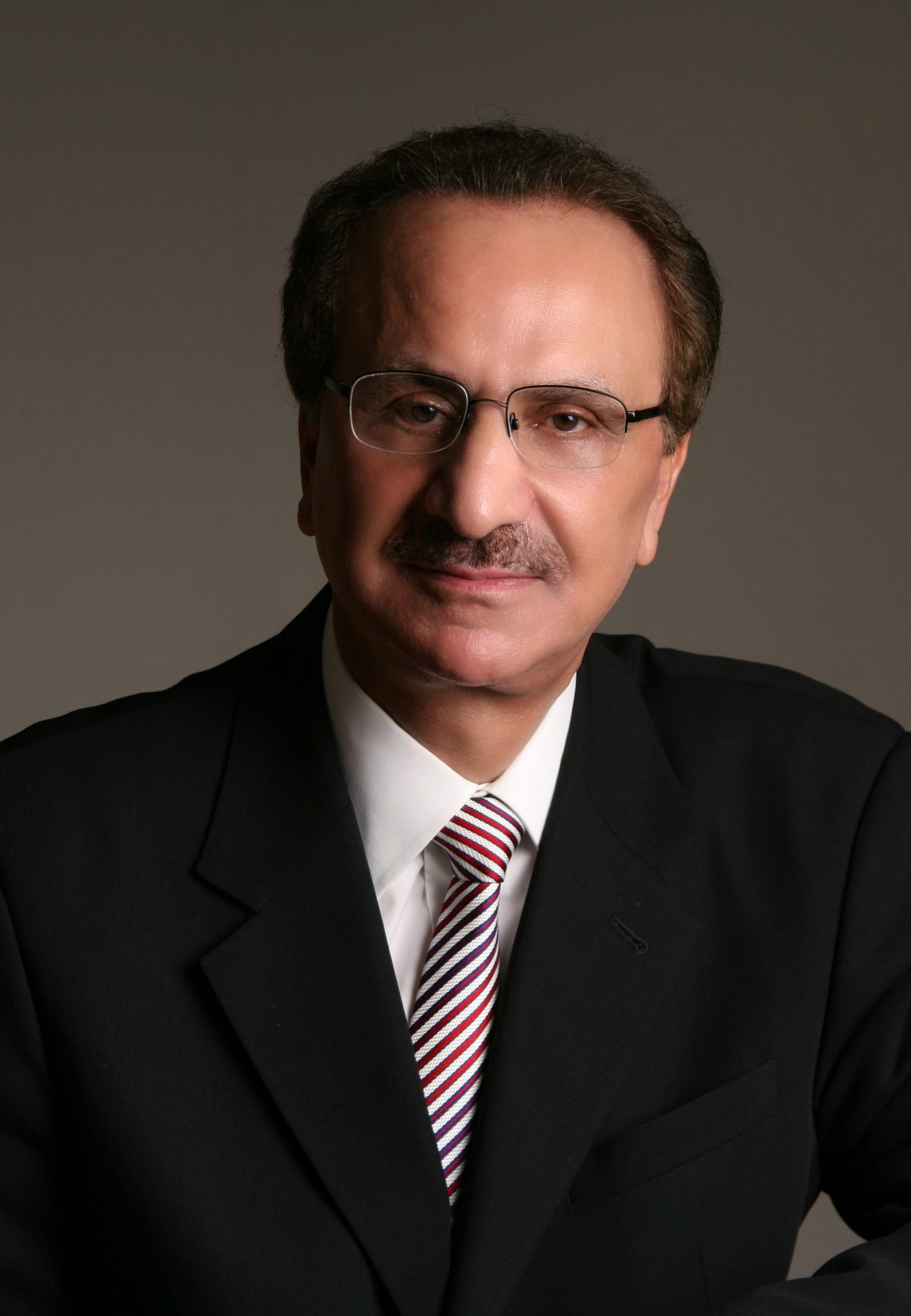

Minister of Electricity, Iraq
- In office August 2003 – May 2005
- President: Ghazi Mashal Ajil al-Yawer(interim) and Jalal Talabani
- Preceded by: Coalition Provisional Authority
- Succeeded by: Mohsen Shlash

Personal details
- Born: 5 July 1951 (age 75) Baghdad, Iraq
- Party: Iraqi National List
- Education: University of Baghdad (BSc) Illinois Institute of Technology (M.S., PhD)
- Profession: Chief Executive Officer (engineering consulting firm)

Aiham Alsammarae (also spelled Aiham Al-Sammarae; Arabic: أيهم السامرائي; born 5 July 1951) is a nationalistic, Sunni Muslim, Iraqi politician who served as Minister of Electricity from August 2003 until May 2005. He has been an active member of the Iraqi National List (headed by Iyad Allawi) and has fought hard for political reconciliation among Iraq's political parties as well as against the policy of de-Ba'athification, since his resignation as Minister of Electricity. Previously, he was a prominent member of the Iraqi Opposition and lived in exile in the United States for over 30 years.

== Family, childhood, and education ==
Alsammarae was born on 5 July 1951 to a prominent Sunni Muslim family in Baghdad, Iraq, the second youngest of 13 children. His father, Jasim, was born and raised in Samarra. He later founded one of Iraq's largest construction companies. From a young age, Alsammarae was intimately familiar with Iraqi politics due to his family's presence in this sphere. Many of his close relatives served as ambassadors, cabinet advisors, and members of parliament. Growing up in the 1960s, Alsammarae received his primary and secondary education in Baghdad, Iraq. He then attended the University of Baghdad, earning his BSc in electrical engineering in 1973.

Upon obtaining his bachelor's degree, he completed his obligatory military duty (required of all men over the age of 18 in Iraq) by serving in the Air Force. After completing this requirement, Alsammarae received a scholarship to obtain post-graduate education in the U.S.. He obtained his Masters in Electrical Engineering at the Illinois Institute of Technology in Chicago, IL in 1978 and began work on his PhD

By 1980, Alsammarae had resigned from the Ba'ath Party, and his scholarship to complete his PhD was revoked. In order to complete his studies at IIT, he worked as a teaching assistant and was able to continue with his education, obtaining his PhD in electrical engineering in 1983. After graduation, Alsammarae resided and worked in Chicago, IL as an electrical engineer while also becoming active in the Iraqi opposition. During the 1990s, he became involved with Iraqi charity organizations, sending food, clothing and medicine to those in need in Iraq.

Alsammarae was involved in opposition meetings during the 1990s and leading up to the 2003 invasion of Iraq. In 2003 he was elected as Minister of Electricity and increased electricity production to the highest level seen since the invasion in 2003, despite insurgent attacks, an archaic electrical system, lack of fuel for generators, and lack of qualified personnel.

== Early political career ==
Alsammarae was a member of the Iraqi Ba'ath Party during the 1970s while a young college student in Baghdad, Iraq and was required to remain a Ba'ath Party member in order to obtain a scholarship to continue his studies in the USA. In January 1980, Alsammarae resigned from the party upon news of the execution of two brothers-in-law and one cousin. All three men had been accused of planning a coup attempt against Iraqi president Saddam Hussein; Alsammarae was later implicated in the alleged coup attempt by Iraqi Intelligence officials. Upon resignation from the Ba'ath Party, Alsammarae became active in the Iraqi opposition as well as numerous Iraqi charity and humanitarian groups. In the 1990s, Alsammarae was elected to serve as national board member in the Arab-American Anti-Discrimination Committee and used his role to work on behalf of those suffering under economic sanctions in Iraq. In addition to giving numerous lectures on the detrimental effects of the sanctions on the population of Iraq, Alsammarae organized numerous humanitarian shipments of food, clothing and medicine to Iraq.

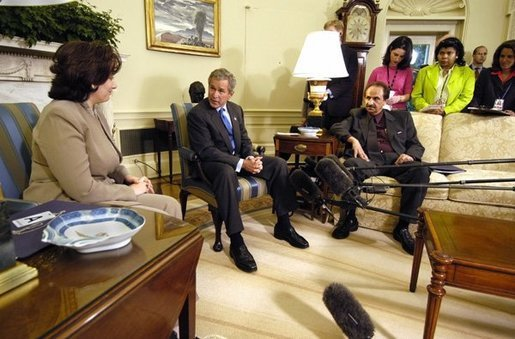
Alsammarae at the White House (September 2003)

In 2002, the US brought numerous Iraqi opposition groups and active opposition members together to discuss the potential for a post-Saddam Iraq. Alsammarae was in attendance at these meetings, and was elected by fellow opposition members to be one of the 65 members of the Coordinating Committee. At these meetings, he advocated the establishment of a secular, democratic Iraq within its currently defined borders. He was strongly opposed to the creation of an Iraqi federation as well as de-Ba'athifaction, both of which were policies put forth by Ahmed Chalabi. Alsammarae has criticized Chalabi's policies and behavior in many instances, including a Washington Times article where Alsammarae denounced Chalabi's move to a former Hussein palace. Such criticism, though supported by many Iraqi politicians, has rendered Chalabi a relentless political enemy to Alsammarae, and a web page deriding Alsammarae can be found on Chalabi's political party website.

== Minister of Electricity ==
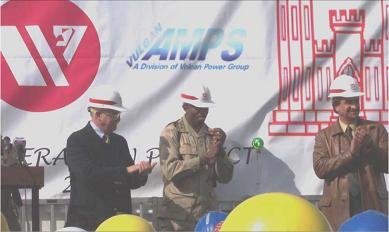
Aiham Alsammarae at the Opening Ceremony of the Baiji Power Plant

In August 2003, Alsammarae was appointed to serve as Minister of Electricity under the Coalition Provisional Authority by Paul Bremer and was the first minister of electricity in post-Saddam Iraq. Alsammarae inherited an archaic system providing an output of around 3,000MW (whereas demand is at minimum, 9,000 MW). Additionally, the national grid suffered from daily attacks and theft, lack of manpower and fuel shortages (despite developing new power plants and refurbishing old ones, the Ministry of Oil refused to give the Ministry of Electricity the oil necessary to fuel the power plants). In 2003 and 2004, Alsammarae complained about the lack of fuel on numerous occasions and tried to involve external mediation to solve the loggerhead. Unfortunately, he was unable to encourage the Ministry of Oil to supply fuel to the Ministry of Electricity and this situation persists and remains a problem for the Ministry of Electricity today.

Despite the numerous problems Alsammarae faced in modernizing Iraq's electrical system, the electrical output observed during Alsammarae's leadership has not since, been matched. In fact, since his departure from the ministry, electricity generation steadily declined to hit all-time lows in October 2006, a full year and a half after he left office. Furthermore, according to current Minister of Electricity, Kareem Waheed, the ministry is still "...working on projects [started] by Dr. Alsammarae".

In addition to his work in the ministry, Alsammarae spearheaded efforts towards reconciliation with Iraqi insurgent groups, in an attempt to get them to lay down their arms and join the political fold. Alsammarae reached out to "..11 separate Iraqi resistance groups, and at least four of the most important resistance groups --- including the Ba'athist Jaish Muhammad – gave him a formal letter declaring their willingness to pursue talks with Washington and the interim regime in Baghdad". Additionally, Alsammarae worked hard to lobby the Iraqi parliament and other Iraqi politicians to reject Chalabi's policy of de-ba'athification. The policy stated that anyone who was a previous Ba'ath Party Member would be ineligible to serve in the current Iraqi regime. This meant that all public servants, including the police and army, were fired over night. Chalabi was able to garner enough support to push the policy through, and enact it into law in 2003; however as of 2009, Prime Minister Nouri al-Maliki revoked the law and called for reconciliation efforts, instead.

== Post Ministry ==
Alsammarae resigned from the Ministry in May 2005 as Ibrahim al-Ja'fari, an Iraqi politician with strong ties to Iran was elected as Prime Minister. Alsammarae remained active in political pursuits such as garnering further support for reconciliation as well as encouraging Sunni Muslims' to be more active in politics. However, in the face of growing Iranian control over Iraq, Alsammarae began to openly criticize the Iranian regime, its presence in Iraq and the Iraqi politicians allied to Iran. This criticism would make him the target of an assassination attempt in January 2006, which resulted in two of his body guards sustaining critical injuries, requiring they be rushed to Amman, Jordan for treatment. The attempt failed, but was followed with charges of corruption leaked to the media by the Iraqi government. Details of the charges are scant, and to date, no Iraqi Government spokesman has revealed any information concerning the charges Alsammarae faced.

According to the Chicago Tribune, Alsammarae heard of these charges while he was at his home in Amman, Jordan. He decided to travel to face these charges, but found that he would, instead, be held without being formally charged by the Commission for Public Integrity. The CPI is heavily criticized by Iraqi politicians, with many, such as Masoud Barazani (Governor of Kurdistan), declaring that the CPI is a tool for political retribution and the "...settling of political scores". Furthermore, the head of the CPI was, himself, accused of corruption by the Iraqi Parliament. Regardless, on 11 October 2006 Alsammarae was convicted of misappropriation of funds regarding a $200,000 generator purchased for the southern province of Maysan. He filed an appeal, and was acquitted of wrongdoing in December 2006. Unfortunately, he was not let out of detainment, and instead was told that he would be taken outside the green zone for finger printing before he would be released. Meanwhile, records show that his family repeatedly contacted the State Department and Senators from their home state of Illinois, asking that they look into his case. On 16 October 2006, Obama's Senate office received a faxed plea from Alsammarae's son, Ramy Alsammarae. "Alsammarae's son claimed in the fax that his father was railroaded for exposing Iraqi government incompetence, and feared his life was in danger." Fearing his safety outside the green zone and cleared of wrongdoing, Alsammarae escaped the unlawful detention and traveled to Amman, Jordan and back to the United States.

Alsammarae, who has been cleared of all allegations and acquitted by the highest appeals court in Iraq, has continued his work in Iraqi politics. He is currently working with the Iraqi National List, headed by Iyad Allawi. He has concentrated his work on continuing efforts in the area of reconciliation and is actively working to bring Iraqis of various ethnic and religious backgrounds together to form one, nationalistic, secular and democratic front.

== Personal life ==
Alsammarae is the CEO of a private engineering consulting firm and lives in Chicago, Illinois, with his wife.

Preceded by Coalition Provisional Authority	Minister of Electricity; September 2003–May 2005	Succeeded by Mohsen Shlash
