= Islamic Action Organisation =

Islamic political party in Iraq

The Islamic Action Organisation (IAO; Arabic: منظمة العمل الإسلامي, romanized: Munaẓamat al-ʿAmal al-Islāmī) is a Shia political party in Iraq. It was founded by religious cleric, grand Ayatollah Mohammed Taqi al-Modarresi in the 1960s, as the Message Movement (Arabic: الحركة الرسالية, romanized: al-Ḥaraka al-Risāliya), and in 1979, was changed to the Islamic Action organisation.

== See also ==
- List of Islamic political parties
