= Iraqi Constitutional Monarchy =

Monarchist political party in Iraq

Iraqi Constitutional Monarchy الملكية الدستورية العراقية
- Leader: Vacant since the death of Sharif Ali bin al-Hussein in 2022
- Founded: 2003
- Headquarters: Baghdad
- Ideology: Monarchism; Constitutional monarchy

Website
- www.iraqcmm.org

1921–1959 (ratio: 1:2) Flag of the Kingdom of Iraq used by Iraqi monarchists

The Iraqi Constitutional Monarchy (ICM; Arabic: الملكية الدستورية العراقية) is a monarchist political party in Iraq formerly led by the late Sharif Ali bin al-Hussein.

Al-Hussein was related to the Hashemites royal family which ruled Iraq until 1958. He had succeeded in establishing himself as a claimant in the international press and (in the politics of Iraq). Prince Sharif Ali bin al-Hussein was the only Iraqi royal campaigning in Iraq for the return of a monarchy based on a constitutional monarchy. Some critics asserted he was not even in line to the throne according to the constitution of the old Iraqi monarchy (The Iraqi Constitution as amended in November 1943). According to this constitution, the heir to the monarchy would be Prince Ra'ad (born 1936), Lord Chamberlain of Jordan, and the heir apparent Prince Zeid bin Ra'ad, a former Jordanian diplomat who was active within the United Nations.

== Goals of the Iraqi Constitutional Monarchy ==
- First: To uphold the unity of the Iraqi nation and to maintain its sovereign independence.
- Second: To affirm the Islamic identity of Iraq while respecting all religions and beliefs and recognizing their inviolable rights.
- Third: To implement a free and direct national referendum to decide the nature of government and the Head of State.
- Fourth: To draft a permanent Constitution to be confirmed by the people of Iraq in a free public referendum.
- Fifth: That the nature of the Monarchy will be hereditary and constitutional emanating from the will of the people and that the Monarch would be the symbol of the unity of the people and the pride and honor of the nation.
- Sixth: The establishment of a pluralistic democratic state in which power is transferred via the ballot box and the establishment of healthy democratic institutions on the basis of the complete separation of power between the executive legislative and judicial branches.
- Seventh: The affirmation of the sanctity of the judiciary and its independence from any group or person in the state.
- Eighth: To completely uphold the principals of basic human rights as laid down by religion, the United Nations, and international institutions.
- Ninth: That the armed forces belong to the people and that their sacred mission is to protect the nation from external aggression and are prohibited from any political activity.
- Tenth: To institute a free economy and encourage and develop the industrial agricultural and commercial sectors while maintaining a balance between the rights of ownership and the free market and the rights of the people to social justice equal opportunity and basic amenities.
- Eleventh: To implement a comprehensive national reconciliation based on forgiveness and absolution far from a desire for vengeance and retribution with due consideration for the rule of law and justice.
- Twelfth: To amend the legacy left by the dark era on the basis of just laws with foremost consideration for ethnic and secular issues, the nationality law, voluntary and forced emigration and on the foundation of equal rights and responsibilities for all citizens as stated in the permanent constitution.

== Role and structure ==
The Iraqi Constitutional Monarchy Movement was a regional political initiative supported by the Jordanian royal family, several Gulf Arab states, and influential Iraqi exile communities. Its aim was to restore Iraq’s Hashemite monarchy under a constitutional, secular, and pluralistic system, with the possibility of a political union with Jordan.

Backers included wealthy exiled Shia Feyli Kurd and Sunni Arab merchant families based in Amman, many of whom had longstanding ties to the Hashemites. Jordan coordinated and financed efforts to organize Feyli merchants into a lobby inside Iraq, because the Feyli establishment had very close ties to the clergy in Najaf. This group sought to persuade Shia political parties and senior clerics to support a national referendum on restoring the monarchy.

The plan ultimately failed due to resistance from Iraqi political factions, suspicion of foreign influence, and opposition from Islamist and nationalist movements. The main opponents of the Feylis were the Islamic Dawa Party, Patriotic Union of Kurdistan and the Islamic Supreme Council of Iraq. While short-lived, the effort reflected ongoing debates over Iraq’s political identity and its historical links to the Hashemite dynasty.
