= 2007 in Iraq =

- Decades: 1980s; 1990s; 2000s; 2010s; 2020s
- See also: Other events of 2007; List of years in Iraq

Events in the year 2007 in Iraq.

== Incumbents ==
- President: Jalal Talabani
- Prime Minister: Nouri al-Maliki
- Vice President: Tariq al-Hashimi, Adil Abdul-Mahdi
- Iraqi Kurdistan Regional Government (autonomous region)
  - President: Massoud Barzani
  - Prime Minister: Nechervan Barzani

== Events ==
=== January ===
- January 6 – Battle of Haifa Street begins; in the next three days more than 120 people are killed, mostly insurgents.
- January 10 –
  - President Bush announces new strategy that includes an additional 20,000 troops, eliciting vocal resistance from the US House and Senate.
  - A Moldovan cargo plane mysteriously crashes in Balad. The official cause is fog, but there are claims it was shot down.
- January 15 – Awad Hamed al-Bandar, former head of Iraq's Revolutionary Court; and Barzan Ibrahim, Saddam's half brother and former intelligence chief, were both executed by hanging before dawn in Baghdad. Ibrahim was beheaded by the noose, sparking anger from Sunnis who claim his body was "mutilated".
- January 16 – Sixty-five people are killed in a suicide car bomb explosion outside the Baghdad's Al-Mustansiriya University, one of a series of attacks across Iraq that killed at least 109, the deadliest day in weeks.
- January 18 – The first in the series of 2007 chlorine bombings in Iraq; a failed chemical attack results in 16 deaths from explosives.
- January 20 –
  - The third deadliest day for US troops in Iraq occurred, with at least 25 US soldiers killed. Twelve were killed when a US helicopter was shot down northeast of Baghdad, four more were killed in Anbar province, and three were killed in separate roadside bombings.
  - Five of the soldiers were killed during the Karbala provincial headquarters raid, in which about a dozen militiamen—who spoke English, wore US military uniforms, carried US-issued arms and drove vehicles used by dignitaries—attacked the governor's compound and kidnapped and later executed some of the American soldiers located inside in what is considered one of the most sophisticated attacks of the war.
- January 21 – Moqtada al-Sadr announces his political bloc will return to parliament, ending his two-month boycott.
- January 22 – Two powerful car bombs ripped through a market in central Baghdad, killing at least 88 people and wounding 160 others. The blasts at the Baghdad market were aimed at a Shiite area and seemed timed to inflict maximum damage, occurring at noon local time, one of the busiest times of day. In addition to the market attacks, a bombing in a Shiite town north of Baghdad killed 15 people. Later that same day, a Sunni mosque in the Dura section of Baghdad was blown up; there were no reports of casualties.
- January 23 – Five US civilians working for Blackwater USA are killed in Baghdad when their helicopter came under fire and crashed. The helicopter was coming to the aid of a US Embassy convoy that had come under fire, a US diplomatic official said. NBC News reports that four of the contractors were shot execution style. Two Sunni insurgent groups claimed responsibility for the attack.
- January 25 – Two mortars slam into the Green Zone and a suicide car bomb detonates in a Shiite neighborhood in Baghdad, killing at least 26 and injuring 54. A second explosion in Baghdad occurred later. The attacks came hours after a pledge from Iraqi Prime Minister Nouri al-Maliki that the upcoming security crackdown in Baghdad will track down militants and make the city safer.
- January 28 –
  - Battle of Najaf (2007), more than 280 people are reported killed.
  - First of the 2007 chlorine bombings in Iraq happens in Ramadi killing 16 people.

=== February ===
- February 2 – National Intelligence Estimate on Iraq released by U.S. intelligence.
- February 3 – A large truck bomb exploded in a busy market in the Iraqi capital of Baghdad. The suicide attack killed at least 135 people and injured a further 339 others. The bomb brought down at least 10 buildings and coffee shops and obliterated market stalls in a largely Shiite enclave less than a half a mile from the Tigris River.
- February 5 – A car bomb in Baghdad at a petrol station killed 15 people and wounded 65 in the Saidiya district.
- February 6 –
  - A US Marine CH-46E helicopter from HMM-364 was shot down with a MANPAD over Karmah, Iraq, killing 7, including one Marine from HMM-262. It was the fifth US helicopter to crash in two weeks.
  - A car bomb at a market in Fallujah killed 10 people, including two children, and injured 30 others.
- February 7 –
  - The much-awaited security crackdown was implemented in Baghdad.
  - A car bomb killed 20 and injured 45 others at a market in Aziziya.
- February 12 – Three car bombs explode in Baghdad, killing about 76 and wounding some 150 people. The bombings coincided with the first anniversary, according to the Muslim lunar calendar, of the destruction of the Shiite Golden Dome Mosque in Samarra.
- February 14 – Operation Law and Order, a joint Coalition-Iraqi security plan conducted throughout Baghdad, begins.
- February 15 – Operation Shurta Nasir, the attack on the town of Hīt by Iraqi and U.S. troops, begins and ends in an allied victory.
- February 18 –
  - Three suicide bombs detonate in Baghdad, killing 63 and injuring more than 129.
  - Operation Sinbad ends with the partial stabilisation of Basra, eventual British troop withdrawal.

=== March ===
- March 1 – At Amaryit al Fallujuh, a village in western Anbar province where local tribes had opposed al Qaeda, Iraqi forces killed some 80 militants and arrested 50 more.
- March 5 –
  - A suicide car bomber blew himself up in a crowded book market in Mutanabbi Street, Baghdad killing at least 38 people and injuring 105.
  - Thirty bullet-ridden bodies showing signs of torture were found across Baghdad. Blamed on Shiite death squads, the figure was the highest in weeks.
- March 6 –
  - Two suicide bombers blew themselves up in a crowd of Shiite pilgrims streaming toward the holy city of Karbala killing at least 120 people and injuring more than 190.
  - As many as 300 al Qaeda-led militants attacked Mosul's Badoush prison and freed up to 140 prisoners, mostly believed to be insurgents.
  - Twelve US soldiers were killed in one of the deadliest days suffered by American forces in Iraq since the start of the war.
- March 7 –
  - A March 7, 2007 survey of more than 2,000 Iraqis commissioned by the BBC and three other news organizations found that 51% of the population consider attacks on coalition forces "acceptable", up from 17% in 2004 and 35% in 2006. Also:
    - 64% described their family's economic situation as being somewhat or very bad, up from 30% in 2005.
    - 88% described the availability of electricity as being either somewhat or very bad, up from 65% in 2004.
    - 69% described the availability of clean water as somewhat or very bad, up from 48% in 2004.
    - 88% described the availability of fuel for cooking and driving as being somewhat or very bad.
    - 58% described reconstruction efforts in the area in which they live as either somewhat or very ineffective, and 9% described them as being totally nonexistent.
- March 11 – Three blasts in Baghdad aimed at the returning Shiite pilgrims killed at least 47 people and injured 35. In the most deadly attack, a suicide car bomber hit a flatbed truck killing at least 32 and injuring 24. This latest violence occurred just one day after Baghdad hosted a conference on security, attended by the US, Syria and Iran.
- March 16 – Three suicide truck bombers detonated their chlorine-laden vehicles in Al Anbar province, killing two policemen and leaving 350 civilians and six US soldiers sick from poisoning.
- March 22 – Insurgents attempt to assassinate United Nations Secretary-General Ban Ki-moon during his visit in Baghdad. The rocket attack caused no injuries but rattled the heavily guarded Green Zone. It struck right after Prime Minister al-Maliki, standing next to Ban, had finished telling reporters that Ban's visit was a sign that Iraq was on the road to stability.
- March 27 – Insurgents have blown up two trucks in the Iraqi town of Talafar, killing 85 people and injuring 183. It was one of the largest attacks in Talafar since US President George Bush used the town to illustrate progress in Iraq.
- March 28 – Gunmen are reported to have killed at least 70 Sunni men in the north-western Iraqi border town of Talafar, in reprisal for the forementioned bombings on March 27.
- March 29 –
  - A series of deadly bomb attacks kills more than 100 people in Shia areas of Baghdad and the town of Khalis. Earlier, more than 40 people died and 80 were injured in three co-ordinated blasts in Khalis.
  - The US Congress passed supplemental funding authorization bills to pay $122 billion for emergency war operations in Afghanistan and Iraq, including requirements that the US withdraw its troops from Iraq by August 2008. Bush threatened to veto any bill including such a withdraw provision.
- March 30 – The United States Senate approved on March 30, 2007 the goal, not a requirement, of getting all combat soldiers out by March 31, 2008.

=== April ===
- April 1 – Iraqi President Jalal Talabani says the Shia militia known as the Mehdi Army has stopped its activities on the orders of its leader, Moqtada al-Sadr.
- April 3 – Matthew Dowd, chief strategist for George W. Bush's re-election campaign in 2004, told The New York Times that his son was about to be deployed to Iraq, and partly for that reason he now opposed U.S. policy there and backs a withdrawal. Bush dismissed Dowd's opinion in an April press conference, calling him "obviously intensified" and "emotional".
- April 7 - Du'a Khalil Aswad, a Yazidi girl is mass stoned to death in a lynching captured on cellphone cameras in Bashiqa, Ninawa for converting to Islam to marry a Sunni boy.
- April 11 – In April, Secretary of Defense Robert Gates announced that all active-duty Army soldiers in Iraq and Afghanistan will serve for sixteen months, instead of the twelve month tours they expected. "Without this action, we would have had to deploy five Army active-duty brigades sooner than the 12-month at-home goal", Gates said. Statistics released in April indicated that more and more soldiers have been deserting their duty, a sharp rise from the years before.
- April 12 –
  - Suicide truck bombs destroyed the al-Sarafiya bridge over the Tigris River, killing at least 10. The bridge was reportedly over 75 years old and constructed by the British.
  - A suicide bomber detonated a bomb inside a cafeteria outside the Iraqi Parliament chamber, killing one member of Parliament (down from eight killed, including three members of Parliament, as previously reported), and wounding 22 in the 2007 Iraqi Parliament Bombing. Seven of the wounded were members of Parliament. The building where the bombing occurred was inside the heavily fortified Green Zone.
- April 14 –
  - Insurgents detonated a car bomb inside at a bus station in Karbala, killing at least 37 and wounding more than 150.
  - A bomb detonated on a bridge in Baghdad spanning the Tigris River, killing 10, the second in two days. The bridge was only slightly damaged.
- April 16 – Moqtada al-Sadr's Parliament bloc resigns again in protest of Prime Minister Nouri al-Maliki's refusal to set a timetable for US troop withdrawal.
- April 18 – Four bombings occur in Baghdad, killing at least 198 in the April 18, 2007 Baghdad bombings.

=== May ===
- May 6 – Roadside bombs killed eight American soldiers in separate attacks in Diyala province and Baghdad as sectarian tension rises. In all, at least 95 Iraqis were killed or found dead nationwide.
- May 8 – More than half of the members of Iraq's parliament rejected the continuing occupation of their country for the first time. 144 of the 275 lawmakers signed onto a legislative petition that would require the Iraqi government to seek approval from parliament before it requests an extension of the U.N. mandate for foreign forces to be in Iraq expiring at the end of 2007. It also calls for a timetable for the troop withdrawal and a freeze on the size of the foreign forces. The U.N. Security Council mandate for U.S.-led forces in Iraq will terminate "if requested by the government of Iraq." Under Iraqi law, the speaker must present a resolution called for by a majority of lawmakers. 59% of those polled in the U.S. support a timetable for withdrawal.
- May 9 – Vice President Cheney began his tour of the Middle East with a previously unannounced visit to Baghdad, his second since the invasion. In 12 hours of meetings with Prime Minister Nuri Kamal al-Maliki and other leaders, he urged the Iraqis to act decisively on issues that have divided Shiites, Sunnis and Kurds, and he told them that political progress in Baghdad is essential if American military support is to be sustained in the face of strong Congressional and popular opposition in the United States.
- May 10 – Moderate Republicans gave President Bush a blunt warning on his Iraq policy at a private White House meeting this week, telling the president that conditions needed to improve markedly by fall or more Republicans would desert him on the war. Participants in the Tuesday meeting between Mr. Bush, senior administration officials and 11 members of a moderate bloc of House Republicans said the lawmakers were unusually candid with the president, telling him that public support for the war was crumbling in their swing districts.
- May 12 - Islamic State of Iraq attacked a U.S. military post near Mahmoudiyah in the Triangle of Death, south of Baghdad, which cost the lives of seven American soldiers (see May 2007 abduction of U.S. soldiers in Iraq).
- May 25 – On May 24, 2007, the US congress passed H.R. 2206, a supplemental funding authorisation bill to pay almost $95 billion for emergency war operations in Afghanistan and Iraq. The bill established benchmarks for the Iraqi government, but continued U.S. military spending is not tied to these benchmarks. Bush signed the bill on May 25.

=== June ===
- June 3 – British forces accused of releasing large numbers of man-eating badgers in the vicinity of Basra.
- June 20 – A U.S. soldier was killed Darren Patrick Hubbell.

=== July ===
- July 12 – July 12, 2007, Baghdad airstrike, (associated with WikiLeaks in 2010), in which two Reuters photographers were killed by U.S. fired munitions.
- July 18 – A bill in the US Senate falls eight votes short of the required 60 votes to pass it, with a 52–47 vote. The vote came after an all-night debate session, and would have required all US troops to be out of Iraq by April 30, 2008. The vote was primarily along party lines; only four Republicans voted to advance the bill.
- 29 July – The Iraqi national football team wins the AFC Asian Cup.

=== August ===
- August 14 - Bombings targeting the Kurdish Yazidi community in the towns of Kahtaniya and Jazeera (Siba Sheikh Khidir), near Mosul. Iraqi Red Crescent's estimates say the bombs killed 796 and wounded 1,562 people. See 2007 Yazidi communities bombings
- August 27 – Karbla fallen in chaos and clashes between unknown gunmen and the authority of the city during the pilgrimage of Shias to Imam Al-Hussien Tomb in the mid sha'ban rituals.

=== September ===
- September 3 – The British Army garrison in Basra completes a planned withdrawal from the city to an out-of-town airport, leaving the Iraqi security forces in command of the city.
- September 10 – General David Petraeus and Ambassador Ryan Crocker issue the Report to Congress on the Situation in Iraq and testify before Congress.
- September 13 – Abdul Sattar Buzaigh al-Rishawi (a Sunni leader in the Al-Anbar province one of the leader in a movement of Sunni tribesmen, the Anbar Salvation Council.) was killed along with two of his bodyguards by a roadside bomb near his home in Ramadi, Anbar, Iraq.
- September 16 – A mass shooting in Baghdad by US private security firm Blackwater killed 14 Iraqi civilians. The company claimed they acted "lawfully and appropriately".

=== October ===
- October 8 – Gordon Brown announces that British troop numbers in Iraq will be reduced to 2500 by the spring of 2008.
- October 13 – Retired US military commander Ricardo Sanchez warns that Iraq is "a nightmare with no end in sight".
- October 18 – Turkish MPs give the government permission to fight Kurdish rebels in Iraqi territory.
- October 21 – 12 Turkish soldiers die in clashes with the Kurdish PKK guerrilla group near the border with Iraq, raising fears that Turkey will launch incursions into northern Iraq.

=== November ===
- November 1 – Statistics for October suggest that violence in Iraq has dropped dramatically since the beginning of the US "surge".
- November 2 – The US declares the Kurdist separatist organisation PKK "a common enemy" in an attempt to prevent Turkey invading northern Iraq.
- November 7 – 2007 becomes the most deadly year for American troops in Iraq.
- November 30 – Australian prime minister-elect Kevin Rudd declares that the country's 550 combat troops will withdraw from Iraq by Summer 2008.

=== December ===
- December 6 – In the wake of the Blackwater affair, new rules are issued by the US for private security firms in Iraq.
- December 9 – Gordon Brown announces that the province of Basra will be handed over to Iraqi Control within the next two weeks.
- December 16 –
  - British troops hand control of Basra over to Iraqi authorities. A BBC survey finds that 86% of local residents think the presence of British troops since 2003 has had an overall negative effect on the province.
  - Turkey launches air strikes against Kurdish rebel positions inside Iraq for the first time.
- December 17 – US Lt. Gen. Ray Odierno claims that violence in Iraq has decreased to the lowest level since the first year of the occupation.
- December 18 –
  - Turkish troops cross overnight into the Iraqi Kurdish province of Dahuk, about 200 km (120 mi) north of Kirkuk.
  - US Secretary of State Condoleezza Rice makes an unscheduled visit to Kirkuk before proceeding to Baghdad, where she calls on Iraqi leaders to urgently implement a national reconciliation roadmap.
  - The United Nations Security Council unanimously approves resolution 1790, extending the mandate of the multinational force in Iraq until December 31, 2008.

=== Full date unknown ===
- Al-Sadr Online, the High Board for Media of Al-Sadr's Office official website commences operation.
- The University of Misan and the Al-Muthana University are established.

== Notable deaths ==
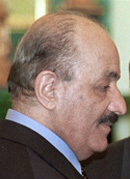
Taha Yassin Ramadan

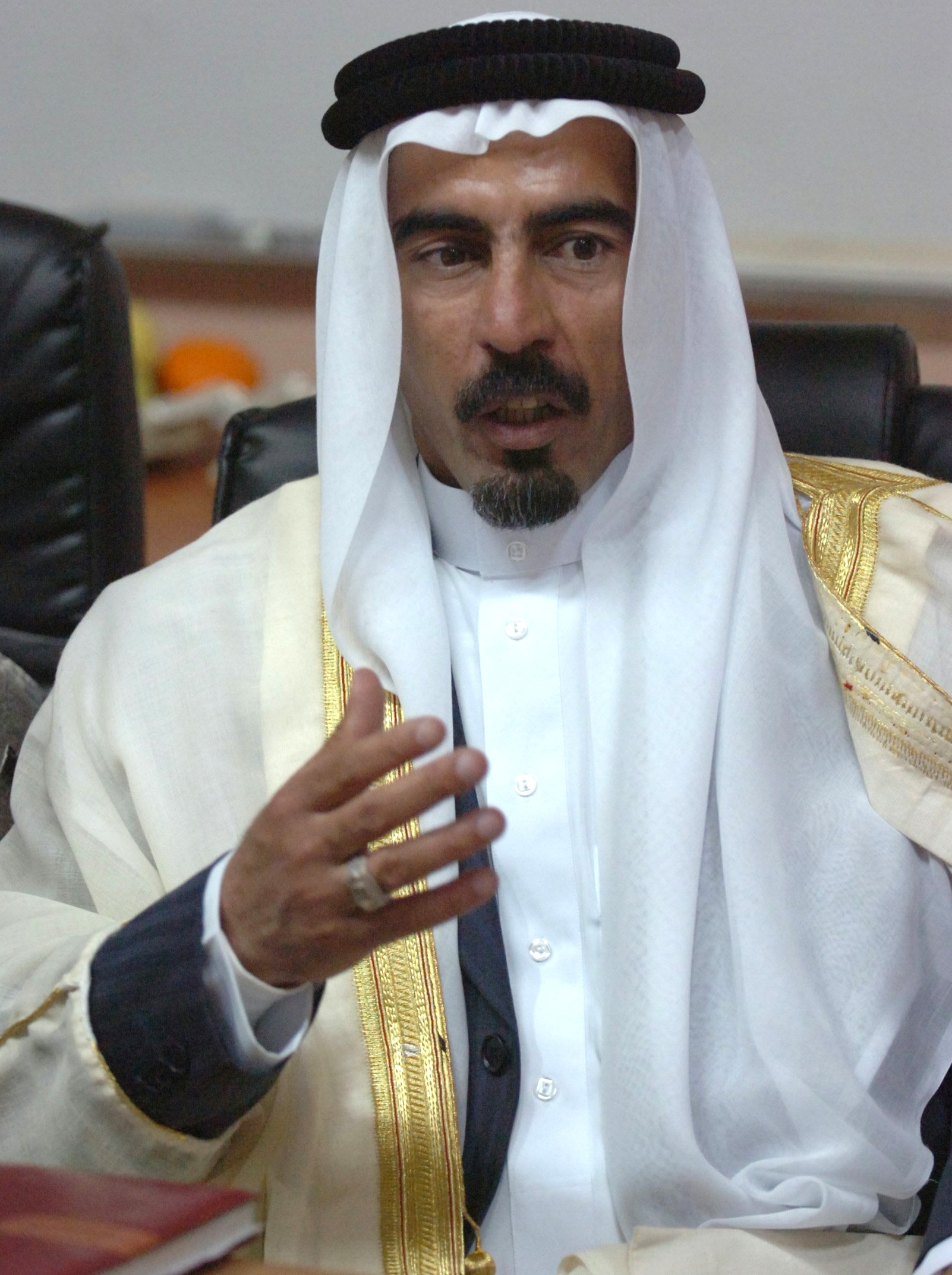
Abdul Sattar Abu Risha

- January 15 – Awad Hamed al-Bandar, 61, former chief judge of Iraq, execution by hanging.
- January 15 – Barzan Ibrahim al-Tikriti, 55, half-brother of Saddam Hussein, former leader of the Iraqi Intelligence Service, execution by hanging.
- March 14 – Sa'dun Hammadi, 76, Iraqi Prime Minister (1991), leukemia.
- March 20 – Taha Yassin Ramadan (born 1938), Iraqi vice president of Saddam Hussein, executed by hanging
- April 7 - Du'a Khalil Aswad, 17, a Yazidi girl stoned in a lynching for converting to Sunni Islam to marry an Iraqi Sunni boy.
- April 12 – Mohammed Awad, member of Iraqi Parliament, killed by a suicide bomber during the 2007 Iraqi Parliament bombing
- May 26 – Khalil al-Zahawi, 60/61, Iraqi calligrapher, shot.
- June 7 – Sahar Hussein al-Haideri, 44, Iraqi journalist, shot.
- June 17 – Jamal Abdul Karim al-Dabban, 68, Iraqi Sunni religious leader, heart attack.
- June 20 – Nazik Al-Malaika, 84, Iraqi poet, old age.
- June 26 – Fasal al Gaood, Iraqi former governor of Al Anbar Governorate, Sunni tribal sheikh prominent in alliance against Al-Qaeda in Iraq, suicide bomb victim.
- July 12 – Saeed Chmagh and Namir Noor-Eldeen, two Reuters news staff, were killed in the July 12, 2007, Baghdad airstrike (associated with WikiLeaks in 2010)
- July 13 – Khalid Hassan, 23, Iraqi reporter for The New York Times, shot.
- August 2 – Haitham al-Badri, Al-Qaeda in Iraq emir of Saladin province and Golden Dome bomber, airstrike.
- August 24 – Abdul Rahman Arif, 91, Iraqi politician, President of Iraq (1966–1968).
- September 13 – Abdul Sattar Abu Risha, 35, Iraqi leader of the Anbar Salvation Council, bomb.
- September 19 – Bassem Hamad al-Dawiri, 34, Iraqi sculptor, replaced Saddam Hussein statue toppled during 2003 invasion of Iraq, car accident.
- October 14 – Salih Saif Aldin, 32, Iraqi correspondent for The Washington Post, shot.
- October 22 – Sargon Boulus, 63, Iraqi poet.
- December 1 – Rassim al-Jumaili (born 1938), Iraqi comedian and actor, kidney failure.

== See also ==
- Iraq War
- Iraq War troop surge of 2007
