= List of assassinations during the Iraqi conflict =

Since the beginning of the Iraq War (and, by extension, the Iraqi conflict) in 2003, Iraqi insurgents have targeted public figures and important individuals whom they believe to be working for the Coalition or its allied Iraqi forces.

== Foreigners ==
- Sergio Vieira de Mello, UN High Commissioner for Human Rights and Special Representative for Iraq, killed in the 2003 Canal Hotel bombing by Jama'at al-Tawhid wal-Jihad.

== Governing Council ==
- Aqila al-Hashimi, member of the Governing Council, assassinated by Ba'athists in western Baghdad.
- Izzedine Salim, head of the Iraqi Governing Council, assassinated in JTJ car bombing in the Green Zone.

== Journalists ==
- Atwar Bahjat, shot while covering the 2006 al-Askari mosque bombing for Al Arabiya.

== Lawyers ==
- Saadoun Sughaiyer al-Janabi, shot in his home by masked gunmen in Iraqi Police uniforms.
- Adel al-Zubeidi, shot while driving through a Sunni neighborhood of Baghdad.
- Khamis al-Obeidi, abducted and shot while defending Saddam Hussein at his trial.

== Members of Parliament ==
- Dhari Ali al-Fayadh, assassinated by al-Qaeda in Iraq car bombing.
- Lamia Abed Khadouri Sakri, female MP, killed April 27, 2005
- Mohammed Awad, killed in the 2007 Iraqi Parliament bombing.
- Saleh al-Ogaili
- Harith al-Obeidi, leader of Iraqi Accord Front

== Military figures ==
- Sheikh Sittar, Awakening Council leader, killed with an improvised explosive device planted by AQI.
- Fasal al Gaood, killed in suicide bombing at the Al Mansour Hotel.
- Hussein Ali al-Shaalan

== Police chiefs ==
- Khedeir Mekhalef Ali, Khaldiya police chief; September 15, 2003
- Amer Ali Nayef, Baghdad deputy police chief; January 10, 2005
- Khalid Hassan, Diwaniya police chief; August 11, 2007
- Ali al-Deylan, Baquba police chief; September 24, 2007
- Saleh Mohammed Hassan, Mosul Provincial Police Chief; January 24, 2008

== Professors ==
- Abdul-Latif Ali al-Mayah, assassinated under suspicious circumstances during a period of violence against Iraqi intellectuals and academics.

== Provincial governors ==
- Ali Al-Haidri, Baghdad Governorate, assassinated by a group led by Abu Musab al-Zarqawi.
- Raja Nawaf Farhan al-Mahalawi, Anbar Governorate, kidnapped during the Battle of al-Qa'im and killed May 2005
- Osama Youssef Kashmoula, Ninawa Governorate, killed July 14, 2005
- Khalil Jalil Hamza, Al-Qādisiyyah Governorate

Date	Victim	Role	(Suspected) Attacker	Location	Source
10 April 2003	(Iraq) Abdul-Majid al-Khoei	Shia cleric.	Suspected Sadr followers	Najaf	
29 August 2003	(Iraq) Mohammad Baqir al-Hakim	Shia cleric.	Al-Qaeda	Najaf	
1 November 2004	(Iraq) Hatem Kamil	Deputy Governor Baghdad Governorate	Al-Qaeda	Baghdad	
20 August 2007	(Iraq) Mohammed Ali al-Hasani	Governor Muthana province	Unknown	Samawa	
13 September 2007	(Iraq) Abdul Sattar Abu Risha	Sunni tribal leader	Islamic State of Iraq	Ramadi	
March 2008	(Iraq) Paulos Faraj Rahho	Chaldean Catholic Archbishop	Al-Qaeda	Mosul	
10 January 2020	(Iraq) Ahmed Abdul-Samad	Journalist	Iranian backed militias	Basra	
6 July 2020	(Iraq) Hisham al-Hashimi	Journalist	Kata'ib Hezbollah	Baghdad	
19 August 2020	(Iraq) Reham Yacoub	Doctor	Iranian backed militias	Basra	
7 November 2022	(United States) Stephen Troell	Teacher	Cell commanded by IRGC-QF officer Mohammad Reza Nouri	Baghdad	
