= MoveOn.org ad controversy =

2007 controversy

The MoveOn.org ad controversy began when the U.S. anti-war liberal advocacy group MoveOn.org published a full-page ad in The New York Times on September 10, 2007, accusing General David H. Petraeus of "cooking the books for the White House". The ad also labeled him "General Betray Us". The organization created the ad in response to Petraeus' Report to Congress on the Situation in Iraq. MoveOn hosted pages on its website about the ad and their reasons behind it from 2007 to June 23, 2010. On June 23, 2010, after President Obama nominated General Petraeus to be the new top U.S. and NATO commander in Afghanistan (taking over the position from retiring General Stanley McChrystal), MoveOn erased these webpages and any reference to them from its website.

== Contents ==
=== Arguments ===
The ad argued:

- "Every independent report on the ground situation in Iraq shows that the surge strategy has failed."

The group later cited the GAO, NIE, and Jones reports published for Congress around the same time as Petraeus' report. USA Today compared the four reports' findings. The New York Times also did so. The group referred to an Associated Press study finding that the civilian death toll in August 2007 was the second highest since the surge began. The study found as well that "monthly death tolls began to decline after the new security plan was launched" and that "Deaths went down in Baghdad during August". The group also referred to a Los Angeles Times article stating that "the U.S. troop increase has had little effect."

- "Yet the General claims a reduction in violence. That’s because, according to the New York Times, the Pentagon has adopted a bizarre formula for keeping tabs on violence. For example, deaths by car bombs don’t count."

The group later referred to an editorial by liberal columnist Paul Krugman. The Washington Post has stated that Petraeus' report included data about car bombs.

- "The Washington Post reported that assassinations only count if you're shot in the back of the head -- not the front."

The Washington Post article anonymously quoted a senior intelligence official in Washington commenting on U.S. military data. The official stated that "If a bullet went through the back of the head, it's sectarian" but that "If it went through the front, it's criminal." According to The Washington Post, the MNF-I says that they make no distinction among the possible points of impact on the head.

- "According to news reports, there have been more civilian deaths and more American soldier deaths in the past three months than in any other summer we’ve been there."

The group later cited an Associated Press story stating that "This year’s U.S. troop buildup has succeeded in bringing violence in Baghdad down from peak levels, but the death toll from sectarian attacks around the country is running nearly double the pace from a year ago." The story also stated that "The U.S. military did not get all the additional American forces into Iraq until June 15, so it would be premature to draw a final statistical picture of the effect of the added troops." The group also cited an NPR article quoting former Army Colonel Doug MacGregor calling Petraeus' statistics "an illusion created by the White House". The article concluded by stating that "So is the surge working? The short answer is that no one can know for certain because statistics only tell a small part of the story."

- "We'll hear of neighborhoods where violence has decreased. But we won't hear that those neighborhoods have been ethnically cleansed."

The group later cited a Newsweek story stating that "When Gen. David Petraeus goes before Congress next week to report on the progress of the surge, he may cite a decline in insurgent attacks in Baghdad as one marker of success. In fact, part of the reason behind the decline is how far the Shiite militias' cleansing of Baghdad has progressed: they've essentially won."

- "Iraq is mired in an unwinnable religious civil war."
- "General Petraeus has actually said American troops will need to stay in Iraq for as long as ten years."

The group later referred to a statement by Democratic Congresswoman Jan Schakowsky. The nonpartisan website Factcheck.org criticized previous ads that state that Petraeus supports leaving troops in Iraq for ten more years because Petraeus had only said, during a BBC News interview, that "the average counter-insurgency is somewhere around a 9- or a 10- year endeavor" in reference to The Troubles in Northern Ireland.

=== Criticism ===
The Washington Post's "Fact Checker" stated that the General's report of "sharply declining Iraqi casualty rates is certainly open to analysis, debate, and challenge" but that "MoveOn.org does not provide adequate factual support for its larger assertion that Petraeus is 'constantly at war with the facts' and is 'cooking the books' for the White House".

== Controversies ==
=== Payment controversy ===
The New York Times initially charged MoveOn.org $65,000 for the ad using its "standby rate." The Washington Post has stated that the full one-time rate is $142,000 for an ad receiving guaranteed placement on a specific day. Times public editor and Pulitzer Prize-winner Clark Hoyt later stated in an editorial that the organization was mistakenly charged a rate to which it was not entitled under the newspaper's policies. Moveon.org repaid the difference to the Times on September 25, 2007. The New York Post quoted a Times public relations director saying the full one-time rate was $182,000, an additional $40,000 above what has been paid back.

Fox News stated:

Catherine Mathis, vice president of corporate communication at the Times, said she could not discuss specific advertisers, but said the rate for a special advocacy, full-page, black and white, standby ad is $64,575. At that rate, an advertiser can request that an ad run on a specific date, but cannot be guaranteed such placement.

Conservative columnist George Will argued that "the paper made a huge and patently illegal contribution to MoveOn.org's issue advocacy ad." He also stated that "The Times' performance in this matter confirms an axiom: There can be unseemly exposure of mind as well as of body."

=== Copyright controversy ===
Google and MoveOn were accused of selective adherence to trademark law for removing ads from Google Adwords for Maine Senator Susan Collins, citing infringement of MoveOn trademarks. Wired stated on October 15, 2007 that the "left-leaning political advocacy group, MoveOn.org, is backing down" and will allow Google to show the ads. "We don't want to support a policy that denies people freedom of expression," Moveon.org communications director Jennifer Lindenauer said.

== Response ==
=== Political response ===
Independent Democratic Senator Joe Lieberman, White House Press Secretary Tony Snow, and several Republican presidential candidates criticized the ad. President George W. Bush called the ad "disgusting." Republican presidential candidate Rudy Giuliani called it "character assassination on an American general who is putting his life at risk." Democratic Senator John Kerry also criticized the ad. Democratic presidential candidate Joe Biden said on Fox News Sunday, "They went, in that one instance, I think, overboard. But the point they were trying to make was still valid." Democratic presidential candidate Hillary Clinton said on Meet The Press, "I don't condone anything like that, and I have voted against those who would impugn the patriotism and the service of the people who wear the uniform of our country".

Several other Democratic Senators and Representatives distanced themselves from the ad. Democratic Speaker of the House Nancy Pelosi said "I would have preferred that they not do such an ad." The New York Times has stated that "Democrats acknowledge that the MoveOn advertisement was a distraction and illustrated the difficulties of working with liberal advocacy groups".

Former President Bill Clinton criticized what he called the "disingenuous" "feigned outrage" of the Republicans on CNN's The Situation Room. Minnesota Senatorial candidate Al Franken argued in a Star Tribune editorial "It is, of course, ridiculous that the United States Senate spent a day debating and voting on a resolution condemning an advertisement while our troops remained in Iraq, fighting a war with no end."

Linguist George Lakoff argued that the "ad has raised vital questions that need a thorough and open discussion. The ad worked brilliantly to reveal, via its framing, an essential but previously hidden truth: the Bush Administration and its active supporters have betrayed the trust of the troops and the American people." Liberal blogger Arianna Huffington argued that "Was the MoveOn ad blunt? Yes. Did it go for the jugular? No doubt. But while the way it chose to make its points can be debated, the accuracy of those points cannot." Anti-war activist and Congressional candidate Cindy Sheehan stated that "I have often been critical of MoveOn.org, basically because I feel, for the most part that they support Democrats to the detriment of democracy... The occupation of Iraq is a disaster and I applaud MoveOn for moving a little closer to the true 'anti-war' movement and encourage them to come with us farther."

Council of Foreign Relations fellow Peter Beinart argued that "It is terribly unfortunate that MoveOn.org is essentially calling Petraeus a Republican hack, but it’s the logical result of the position the Bush administration has put him in." Fellow Max Boot accused Moveon.org of "desperate attempts to besmirch one of the most admired soldiers in the entire American armed forces" and argued that the ad will "backfire".

Pete Hegseth, an Iraq War veteran and executive director of Vets for Freedom, published an article in the Weekly Standard calling the ad "utterly shameful." He argued that "It shows contempt for America's military leadership, as well as for the troops who have confidence in him, as our fellow soldiers in Iraq certainly do." Time magazine blogger Joe Klein posted that "It is no small thing to accuse a military man of betraying his country. It is also palpably untrue in this case. Whoever cooked up this ad is guilty of a disgraceful act of malicious puerility." He also posted that "This is a distraction from the main event."

MoveOn.org stood by their ad, stating that the General "offered a twisted version of the truth designed to support prolonging the war" and that "the public needs to know that Petraeus is neither objective nor trustworthy when it comes to assessing progress in Iraq". The organization also stated that the ad had been targeted by a "concerted right-wing smear campaign". The Politico has stated that Moveon.org "welcomes the controversy." Eli Pariser has said, "Sometimes you have to call a spade a spade, even if it’s a respected general". They have since deleted all reference to the ad from their web site.

=== Legislative response ===
On September 20, the Senate passed an amendment by Republican John Cornyn of Texas designed to "strongly condemn personal attacks on the honor and integrity of General Petraeus". All 49 Republican Senators and 22 Democratic Senators voted in support. Democratic Presidential candidates Hillary Clinton and Chris Dodd voted against the amendment while Barack Obama and Joseph Biden did not vote. Obama issued a statement calling the resolution, put forward by Senator John Cornyn, Republican of Texas, "a stunt. By not casting a vote, I registered my protest against these empty politics." The House passed an amendment to a continuing budget resolution which condemned the ad "in the strongest terms" by a 341–79 vote on September 26.

Democratic Senator Barbara Boxer of California drafted a similar amendment on September 20. The text condemned the Petraeus ad as well as a 2002 ad attacking then-Senator Max Cleland of Georgia during the 2002 midterm elections and the Swift Vets and POWs for Truth ads attacking John Kerry during the 2004 Presidential election. Democratic Senator Carl Levin of Michigan said, "They're all disgraceful ads and we ought to treat them the same way". The vote was 50–47 in favor, but since 60 votes were required to pass it, the amendment did not carry.

The Washington Post wrote on September 20 that "Democrats blamed the group MoveOn.org for giving moderate Republicans a ready excuse for staying with Bush and for giving Bush and his supporters a way to divert attention away from the war". Eli Pariser, executive director of MoveOn.org Political Action, stated that "It is unconscionable and outrageous that instead of doing the people's work and ending this war, Congress chooses meaningless and distracting gestures.

=== Popular response ===
A Rasmussen Reports survey found that 23% of Americans approved of the ad while 58% disapproved. The Economist stated on September 27 that "the group had raised $500,000 the day the Senate voted, its biggest one-day fundraising total all year. Over four days, in the midst of the row, it took in $1.6m[illion]."

=== Counter-ads ===
Republican presidential candidate Rudy Giuliani ran his own full-page ad in The New York Times on September 14. Giuliani asked for and received a similar reduced fee as Moveon.org, paying $65,000. Conservative nonprofit lobbying organization Freedom's Watch created two video ads in response to MoveOn.org's ad. On September 24, Freedom's Watch ran a full-page ad in The New York Times attacking former Iranian President Mahmoud Ahmadinejad — calling him a "terrorist". The ad asserted that Ahmadinejad "has supported attacks on our soldiers and our allies".

=== Removal ===
MoveOn hosted pages on its website about the ad and their reasons behind it from 2007 to June 23, 2010. On June 23, 2010, MoveOn erased these webpages and any reference to them from its website. The change took place in the aftermath of President Obama's nomination of Petraeus to be the new top U.S. and NATO commander in Afghanistan upon General Stanley McChrystal's retirement. Commentator Jon Bershad of Mediaite stated, "Since MoveOn is an advocacy group with no claims to unbiased content, there’s nothing unethical about scrubbing the site. However, it is pretty darn funny imagining them hastily running to their computers in the aftermath of Obama’s announcement"
