= Abd al-Karim Barjas =

Iraqi politician (died 2022)

Governor Abdulkareem Burjis al-Rawi عبد الكريم برجس الراوي

Governor of Anbar
- In office April 2003 – August 2004
- Appointed by: Anbar Provincial Council (PC)
- Preceded by: Ahmed Abdallah Saleh
- Succeeded by: Fassal Raikan Alkaood (acting)

Personal details
- Born: 1 July 1946 Rawa, Iraq
- Died: 14 June 2022 (Aged 75) Baghdad, Iraq
- Party: Independent
- Children: Seven
- Education: University of Baghdad
- Occupation: Politician

Abdulkareem Burjis al-Rawi (died 14 June 2022) was the first post-invasion Governor of Iraq's Al Anbar province, serving until August 2004, when he resigned.

== Biography ==
Shortly after the invasion in 2003, Sunni tribal leaders and former Ba'athists, led by members of the Al-Kharbit (Khalifa) and Al-Gaoud (Nimr) families met to select Abdulkareem Burjis, a former General, as their unofficial leader and new Governor of Anbar Province. Burjis's position was later recognized by the coalition.

Barjis resigned in August 2004 after his three sons — Ezideen, Ibrahim, and Mustafa — were released in Fallujah by militants who had been holding them. The militants responsible then released a video on 5 August 2004 showing Barjis resigning and apologizing for opposing the Iraqi insurgency. In the video Barjis stated, "I am Abdulkareem Barjis, governor of Al-Anbar. I declare before God and you my repentance of any action I did against the mujahedin, and I announce my resignation of my post." The United States subsequently announced it would not make concessions to hostage takers. The militants responsible were believed to be members of al-Qaeda in Iraq.

Following his resignation, he retired from public service.

After his resignation an interim governor filled the role of Governor of Anbar. Faisal Raikan al-Gut al-Nimrawi served as interim Governor until being forced out by tribal leaders in January 2005, and the Provincial Governing Council subsequently appointed Raja Nawaf Farhan al-Mahalawi as the new Governor.
