= Petraeus Report =

United States Army General David Petraeus has given several reports on the state of Iraq:

- Initial Benchmark Assessment Report, the interim report released July 12, 2007
- Report to Congress on the Situation in Iraq, the report delivered to the U.S. Congress on September 10, 2007

== See also ==
- Petraeus scandal
