= Taha al-Liheibi =

Iraqi politician

Taha al-Liheibi was an Iraqi politician in the National Assembly of Iraq. He was a member of the Iraqi Accordance Front.

On, April 12, 2007, he was reported killed along with fellow Sunni Mohammed Awad of the Iraqi National Dialogue Council. They were reportedly killed in the Green Zone at the convention centre canteen of the parliament building in Baghdad, Iraq. The reported death was caused by the 2007 Iraqi Parliament Bombing. Later reports were confused and the official death toll the next day was limited to Awad.
