= Iraq Report =

The Iraq Report may refer to:

- The Report to Congress on the Situation in Iraq (2007), also known as the "Petraeus Report", an American report on the progress by the Iraqi government in the ongoing Iraq War
- The Iraq Inquiry (2009), also known as the "Chilcot Inquiry" and the resulting "Chilcot report" (2016), a British public inquiry into the nation's role in the Iraq War
