= Reham Yacoub =

Iraqi activist (1991–2020)

- Born: 1991; Basra, Ba'athist Iraq
- Died: 19 August 2020 (aged 29); Basra, Iraq
- Occupations: Social activist, human rights advocate, doctor

Reham Yacoub also known as Riham Yaqoob (Arabic: رهام يعقوب عزام; 1991 – 19 August 2020) was an Iraqi human rights advocate and doctor by profession who predominantly campaigned against human rights violations in Iraq and also served as a prominent figure protesting against the Government of Iraq during the Tishreeni protests since 2018. She also raised her voice and concern regarding youth employment, infrastructure and access to electricity. She was reportedly receiving death threats since 2018 for organising women's marches and ever since participating in the training courses supervised by the United States Consulate in Basra.

== Assassination ==
On 19 August 2020, she was shot dead by unidentified gunmen along the Al Tijari Street in the southern city of Iraq in Basra. Three others were said to have been injured when the gunmen on a motorcycle opened fire on their car while travelling, with the victim Reham Yacoub inside. According to Al Jazeera, the three others injured were all women, and one of them later also died from her injuries.

Her murder showcased a serious major crackdown and growing violence against anti-government activists and protesters in Iraq. She was the second prominent activist from Basra to be assassinated after Tahseen Osama Al-Shahmani and was the third targeted attack by gunmen against anti-governmental activists in a week in Iraq. New waves of protests in Basra were staged by protesters in the wake of the murder of Reham.

=== Reactions ===
The United Nations Assistance Mission for Iraq and Jeanine Hennis-Plasschaert, Special Representative of the Secretary-General for Iraq, condemned and denounced the killing of the activist in an official statement. The UN envoy added that, "the full force of the law must be applied to find, apprehend and hold the perpetrators accountable, and to put an end to this cycle of violence."

== See also ==
- List of assassinations during the Iraqi conflict
- List of assassinations in Asia
- Suʽad al-ʽAli, Iraqi woman activist killed in Basra in 2018
- Hisham al-Hashimi
