= Zuhair Al-Jezairy =

Iraqi journalist

Zuhair Al-Jezairy sometimes referred to as Zuhair Al Jazairy (Arabic: زهير الجزائري; born 1943 or 1945 in Najaf, Iraq) is an Iraqi journalist, currently editor in chief of Aswat al-Iraq news agency and part of the Iraqi Journalist Union, he was the previous editor in chief of the daily Arabic newspaper Al Mahda, he has also written several publications and has worked on various documentaries.

He studied German literature in Baghdad and has a degree in English from the university of Cambridge. Since 1968, he has worked as a journalist in Baghdad, Beirut and London.
