= Salih Saif Aldin =

Journalist and correspondent

- Born: 1975
- Died: 2007 (aged 31–32); Iraq
- Occupation: Journalist

Salih Saif Aldin (Arabic: صالح سيف الدين; c. 1975 – 14 October 2007) was an Iraqi journalist and correspondent for the Washington Post who was shot dead while on assignment in Baghdad in 2007. According to the Committee to Protect Journalists, Aldin was believed to be the 119th journalist killed in Iraq since the March 2003 invasion of Iraq at the time of his death; 41 other media support workers have also been killed covering the war and insurgency in Iraq.

Aldin, who was originally from Tikrit, began working as a special correspondent from The Washington Post in his hometown in early 2004. He later moved to Baghdad to continue working for The Washington Post. According to a statement from the newspaper, "...he played an instrumental role of the Post's coverage of Iraq," while in Baghdad.

Aldin often wrote under the assumed name, Salih Dehema, to protect his identity. Iraqi journalists working for Western media organizations are often targeted for attack by insurgents.

Salih Saif Aldin was shot while on assignment in the Baghdad neighborhood of Sadiyah. Sadiyah was formerly a mixed Sunni-Shiite neighborhood that is now dominated by Shiites. It is the same neighborhood where New York Times journalist Khalid Hassan was killed in July 2007.

Aldin was 32 years old when he was killed. He left a 6-year-old daughter, Fatima.
