= Utafiyah =

Residential neighborhood in Iraq

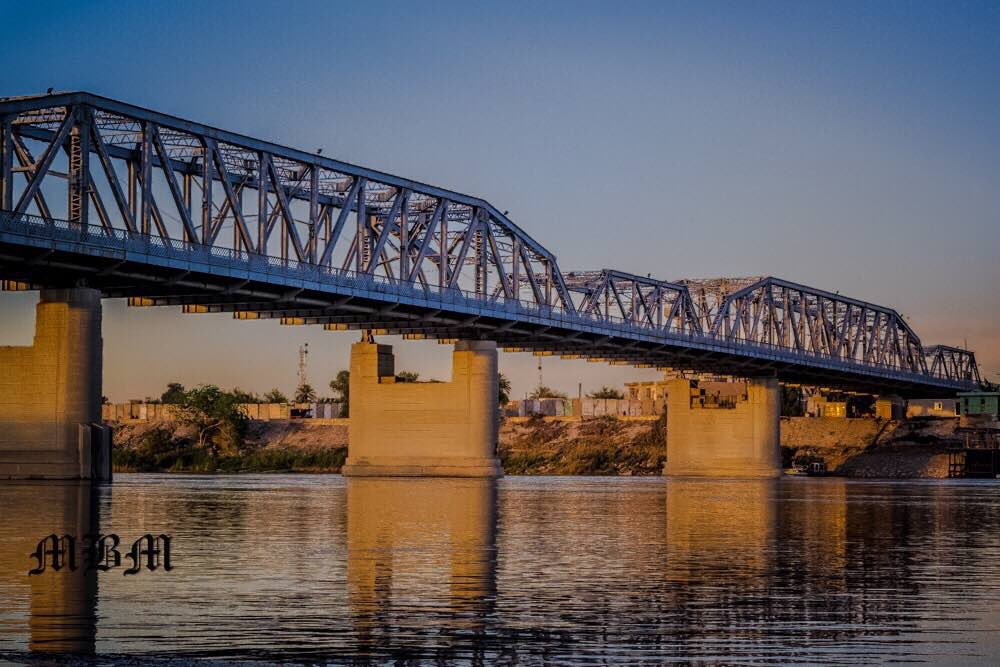

Utafiyah (Arabic, العطيفية) is a neighborhood in Baghdad. It is at one end of the Al-Sarafiya bridge, across the Tigris River from Waziriyah.
