= Al-Wazireya =

Coordinates: 33°22′N 44°23′E

Al-Wazireya الوزيرية
- Neighborhood
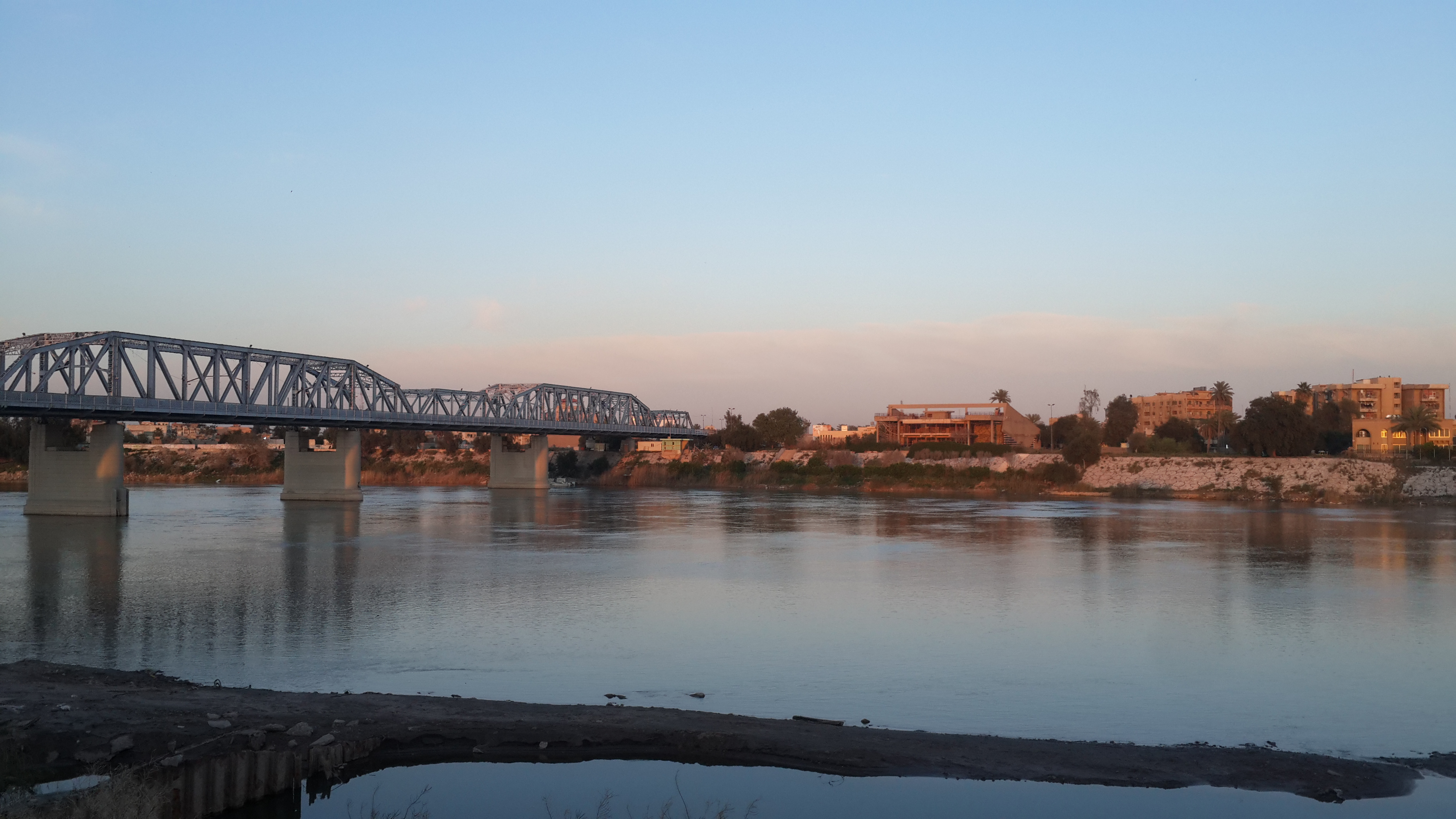
- Al-Sarafiya bridge in Al-Wazireya
- Interactive map of Al-Wazireya
- Location in Baghdad, Iraq Al-Wazireya (Iraq)
- Country: Iraq
- Governorate: Baghdad Governorate
- City: Baghdad
- District: Adhamiyah
- Time zone: UTC+3 (Arabian Standard Time)
- Area code: +964

Al-Wazireya or Waziriyah (Arabic: الوزيرية) is a neighborhood in the Adhamiyah District of Baghdad, Iraq. It is at one end of the Al-Sarafiya bridge, across the Tigris River from Utafiyah.
