= Mohammed al-Dayni =

Iraqi politician

Mohammed al-Dayni is an Iraqi politician and member of the Council of Representatives of Iraq.

al-Dayni was elected in the December 2005 Iraqi legislative election as one of the eleven MPs of the Sunni Arab-majority secular Iraqi National Dialogue Front party.

== Visit to America ==
In July 2007 al-Dayni visited the United States for nearly a month and held talks with policymakers in Washington DC trying to persuade them to hold talks with "the real representatives of the Iraqi resistance" - supporters of former President Saddam Hussein's Ba'ath Party.

== Arrest ==
In February 2009, two of his bodyguards were arrested on suspicion of involvement in the 2007 Iraqi Parliament bombing and other attacks. Alaa Khairallah Hashim, his security chief and Ryadh Ibrahim al-Dayni, his nephew, confessed on television and said the MP had given authorisation for the bomber to enter the parliament area. Mohammed al-Dayni claimed that the accusations were lies and that his bodyguards had been tortured into making a false confession because he had been disclosing human rights abuses in Iraqi prisons.

The security forces asked the Council of Representatives of Iraq to lift al-Dayni's parliamentary immunity. al-Dayni took a flight to Jordan, but the airplane was forced to turn back; parliament then agreed to lift his immunity. However, al-Dayni fled before he could be arrested.

He was eventually arrested on October 10, 2009 at Kuala Lumpur International Airport after he entered Malaysia with a fake passport. The authorities were preparing his deportation.
