= Aswat al-Iraq =

Independent national news agency in Iraq

Aswat al-Iraq أصوات العراق
- Type: Independent News Agency
- Country: Iraq
- Founded: 2004; 21 years ago
- Area: worldwide
- Official website: Aswat al-Iraq News Agency (in English)

Aswat al-Iraq (in Arabic اصوات العراق, Kurdish ئه‌سوات ئه‌لعیراق) is an independent national news agency in Iraq, established in 2004. Funded by the United Nations Development Program, and with assistance from the Reuters Foundation and Internews, it produces over 60 stories a day in Arabic, some 20 to 25 in English and 15 to 20 in the Sorani dialect of Kurdish. All stories are published on the agency's website. Aswat al-Iraq means 'Voices of Iraq' in English.

Aswat's director is the Iraqi journalist and writer Zuhair Al-Jezairy, who in 2008 was a visiting scholar at the U.S. Institute of Peace. Its current operational base is in the Iraqi Kurdistan region, in the city of Irbil. The agency operates a network of reporters and stringers in all of Iraq's 18 governorates, plus regional cities of importance to Iraqi news such as Amman, Cairo, Damascus and Tehran.

Its Arabic service has long been widely reprinted and used by media in Iraq and the wider Arab world, such as the London-based Al Sharq Al Awsat newspaper, the Jordanian newspaper Ad Dustour, and the Saudi Press Agency. Its English service has been quoted in international media, such as The Washington Post, The Christian Science Monitor, the UK's The Guardian and Germany's DPA, as well the NGO Amnesty International.

Three journalists who worked for Aswat al-Iraq have been killed, including Sahar Hussein al-Haideri, who in 2007 won a Kurt Schork award in International Journalism, and in 2008 posthumously won an Amnesty International UK Media award. Aswat al-Iraq was based in Baghdad until 2005, when it move to Cairo, citing security concerns. In Cairo it was hosted by the Egyptian Journalists Syndicate. The desk moved to Irbil in the spring of 2007 and maintains a network of correspondents and editors in the Iraqi capital.

Aswat has served as a training school for journalism since its inception. Interviews with director Jezairy, editors, clients and supporters of the agency are online in Arabic, English and Kurdish

Legally, Aswat is registered both as an offshore company in Cyprus and a non-profit organisation in the Kurdish autonomous region. Registration as an NGO in Baghdad is in process.
