= Maamoon Sami Rasheed al-Alwani =

Iraqi politician

Governor Maamoon Sami Rasheed al-Alwani
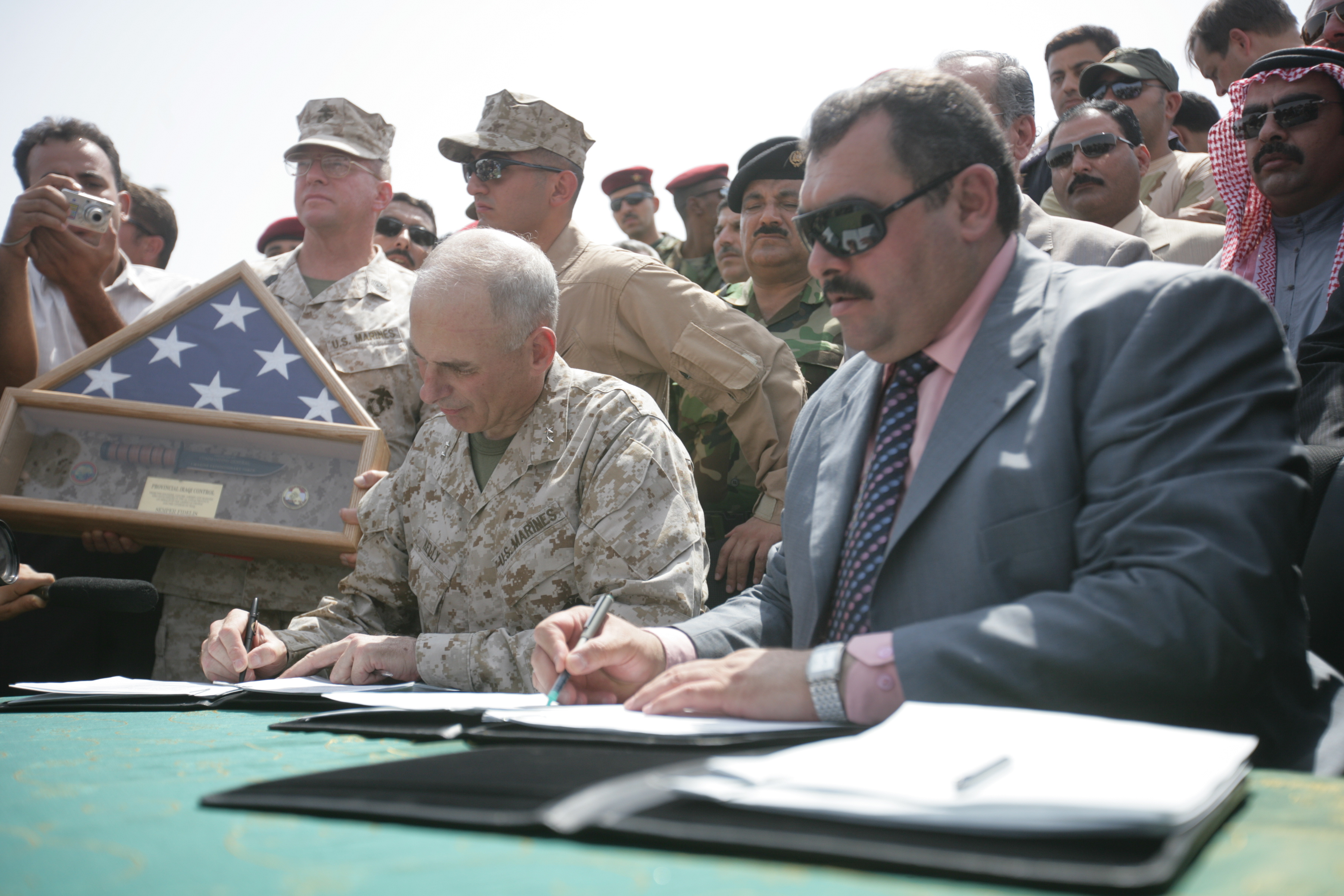
- Maj. Gen. John Kelly and Gov. Maamoon Sami Rasheed al-Alwani sign provincial Iraqi control documents on Sep. 1, 2008.

Governor of Anbar
- In office May 2005 – April 2009
- Appointed by: Anbar Provincial Council (PC)
- Preceded by: Raja Nawaf Farhan al-Mahalawi
- Succeeded by: Qasim Al-Fahdawi

Personal details
- Born: 1957 (age 68–69)
- Party: Iraqi Islamic Party (IIP)
- Occupation: Politician
- Profession: Structural Engineer

Maamoon Sami Rasheed al-Alwani (born 1957) is an Iraqi politician, who served as governor of the Al Anbar province. He was appointed by the Anbar Provincial Council in May 2005, following the death of his predecessor, Raja Nawaf Farhan al-Mahalawi. He was a member of the Abu Alwani clan, part of the Dulaim tribe. His name was found along with the names of other prominent Iraqi Sunni leaders who had been targeted for assassination in a captured al-Qaeda in Iraq (AQI) document.

Insurgents kidnapped Alwani's son on 6 September 2005, but he was later safely returned. In March 2007, two of Alwani's nieces were killed in improvised explosive device (IED) attacks.

In late October 2007, Alwani was part of a delegation of the Anbari government and tribal officials that traveled to the United States to drum up support for reconstruction efforts in the province upon an official invitation from the US Department of State. The following month, Alwani expressed to reporters that his primary concern was that a sectarian-divided Iraq would inspire meddling from Iran and other neighboring countries. He also invited private investors from the US to help develop Anbar's oil and natural reserves in the southern Akaz region.

== Assassination attempts ==
Alwani survived at least 31 assassination attempts since assuming office in May 2005.

On 18 August 2005, insurgents opened fire on the governor and a group of prominent Sunni Muslim clerics as they were meeting in Ramadi. Witnesses said Alwani was holding talks with members of the Muslim Clerics Association in Ramadi's Al Dawla al-Kabeer mosque when the gunmen opened fire. The governor and the head of the Muslim Clerics Association in Ramadi, Thamir al-Dulaimi, escaped injury, but Dhahir al-Obeidi, head of the Sunni Endowment organization, was wounded along with his deputy.

In early May 2006, Alwani escaped with minor wounds when a bomb exploded near his convoy. The bomb exploded as he was traveling to his office in Ramadi.

On 25 December 2007, several mortar rounds hit the governor's office at the Government Center in downtown Ramadi.

== See also ==
- Al Anbar Governorate
- Iraqi Islamic Party (IIP)
- Provincial Government (Anbar)
