= Al-Sarafiya Bridge =

Al-Sarrafiya Bridge جسر الصرافية
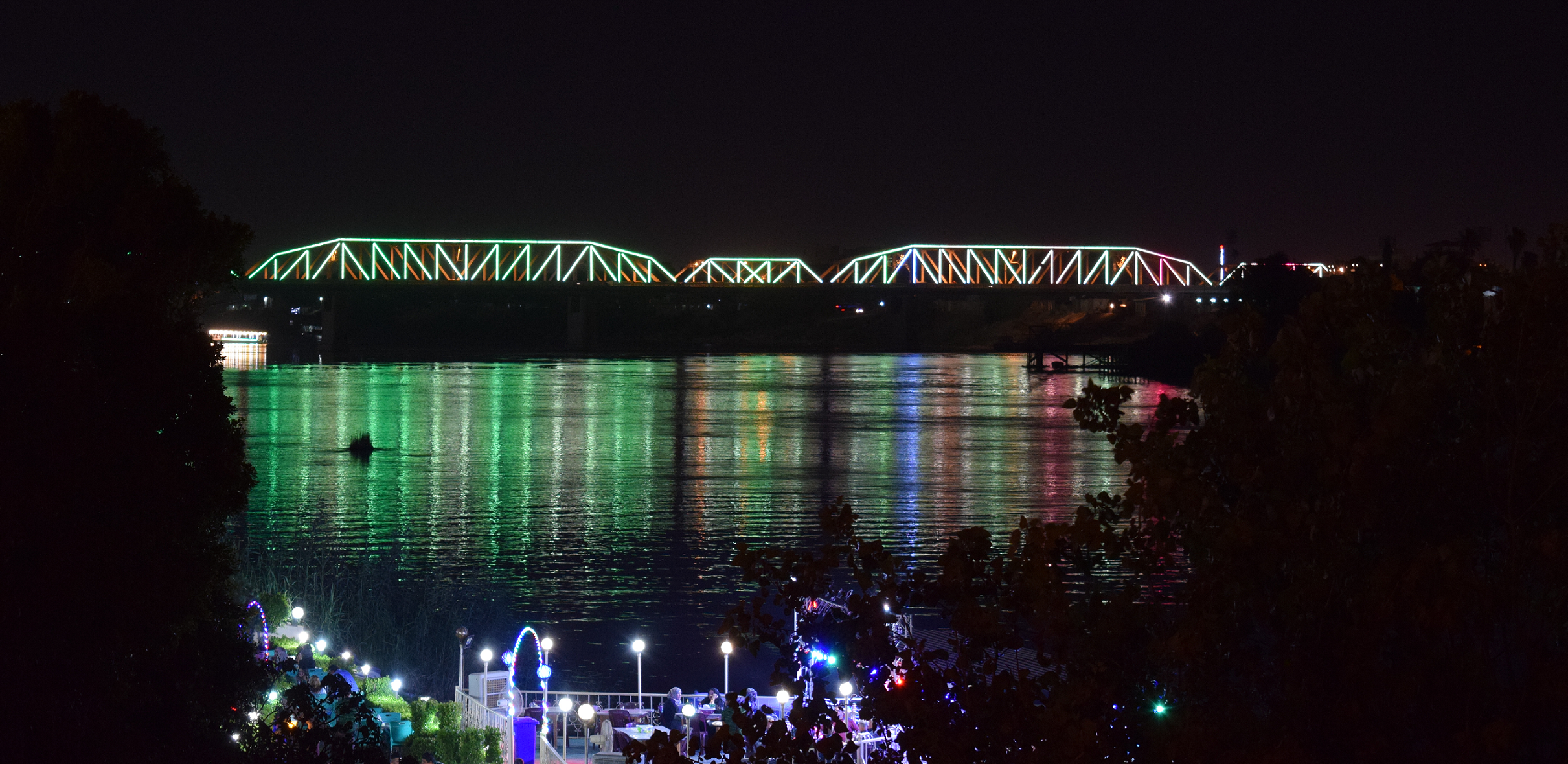
- Al-sarrafiya bridge at night, June 2017
- Coordinates: 33°21′13″N 44°22′22″E

History
- Rebuilt: 27 May 2008
- Collapsed: 12 April 2007

Location
- Interactive map of Al-Sarrafiya Bridge

The Al-Sarafiya Bridge (Arabic: جسر الصرافية) crosses the River Tigris in Baghdad, Iraq. It was built in the 1940s or 1950s and connected the two northern Baghdad neighborhoods of Waziriyah and Utafiyah.

Having been previously damaged by American bombing in 1991, the bridge partially collapsed when an abandoned truck bomb exploded on April 12, 2007 at 0700 local time, UTC+3. At least 10 people were killed and 26 injured, though there were reports of 20 more trapped in cars that had gone off the bridge.

The bridge was reconstructed in a year and two months and reopened on May 27, 2008, when former Prime Minister Nouri al-Maliki inaugurated it.

== Gallery ==
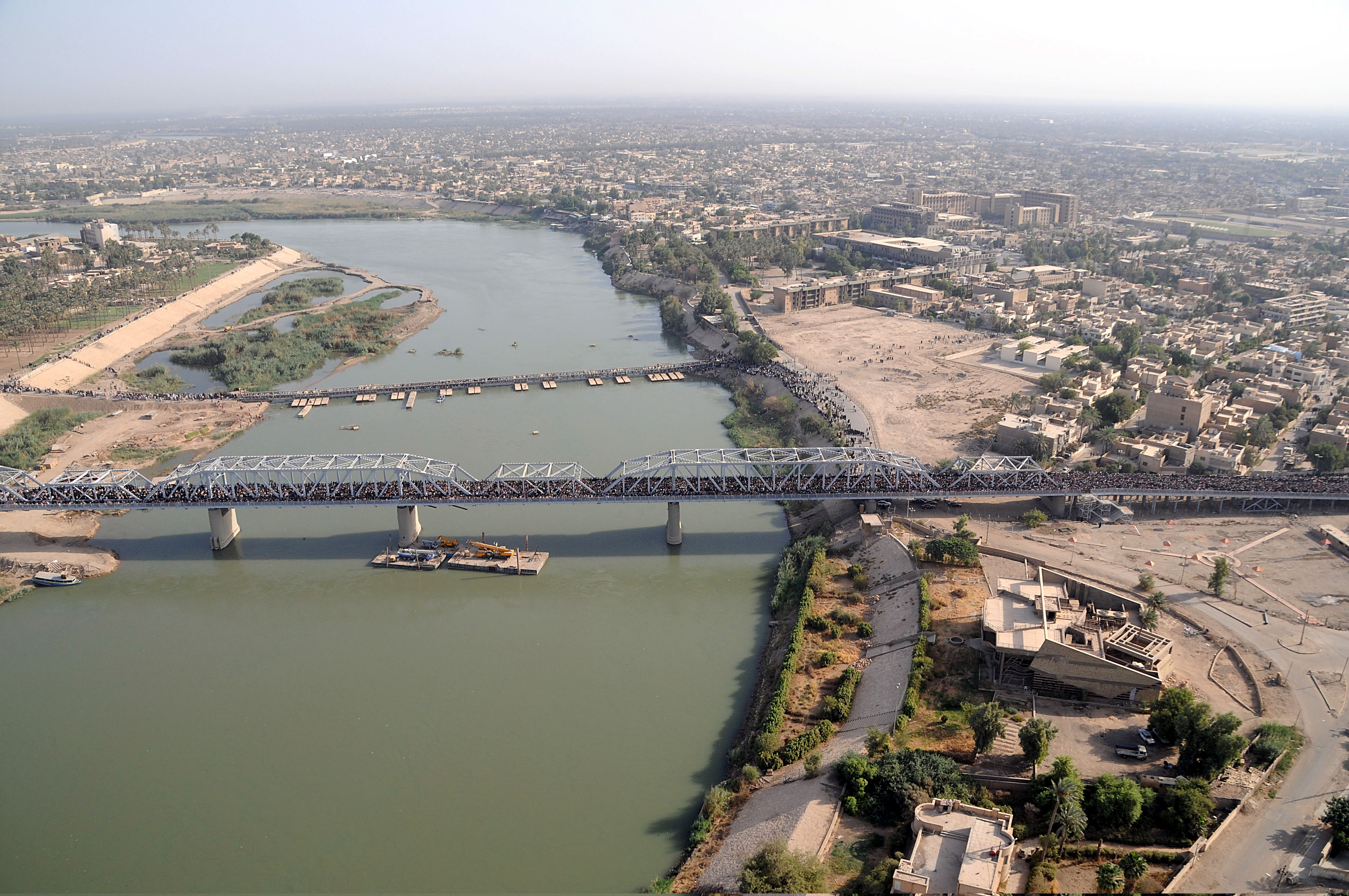
Pilgrims Cross Over New Bridge in July, 2008

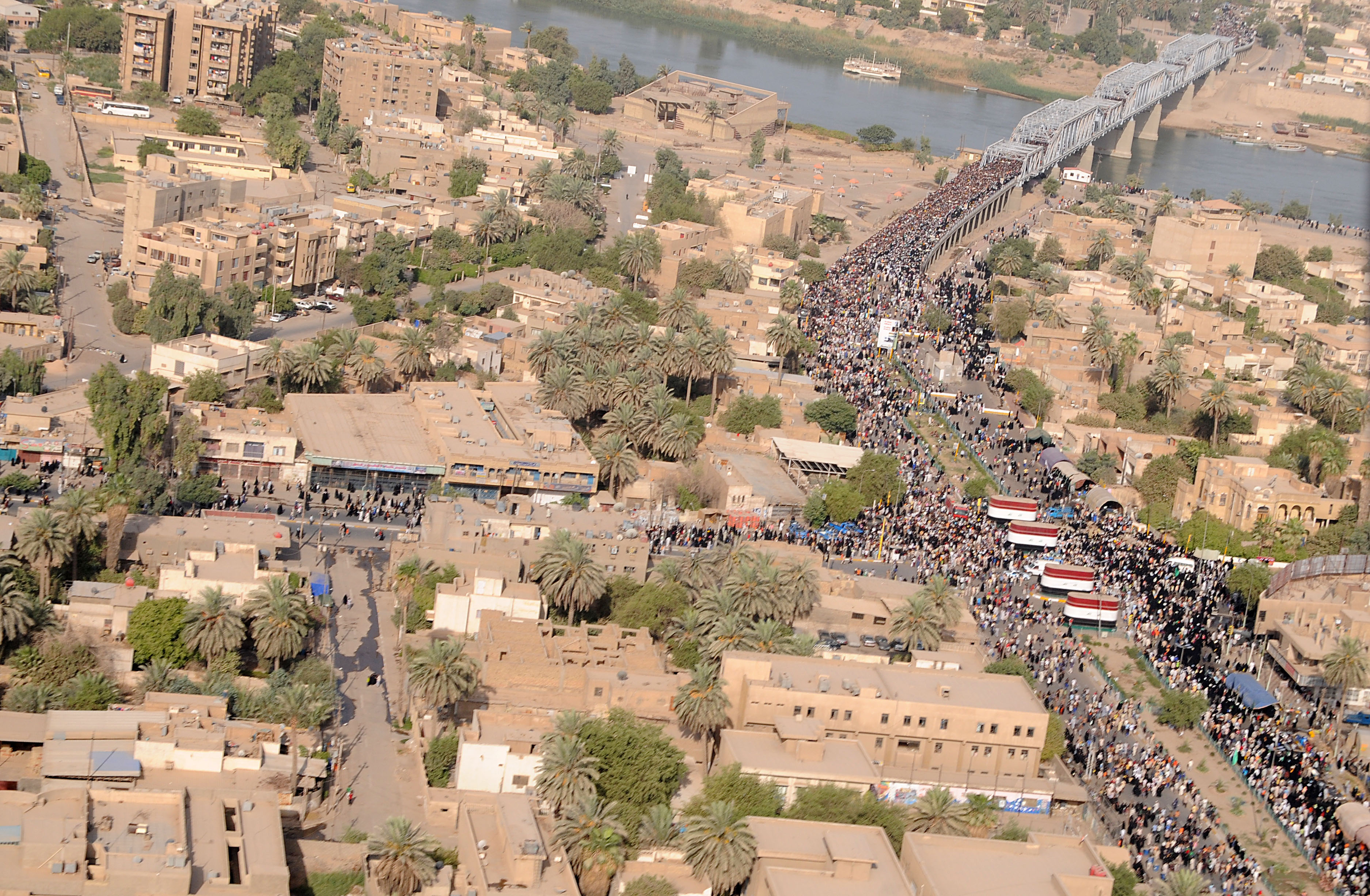
Pilgrims Cross Over the New Bridge in July, 2008

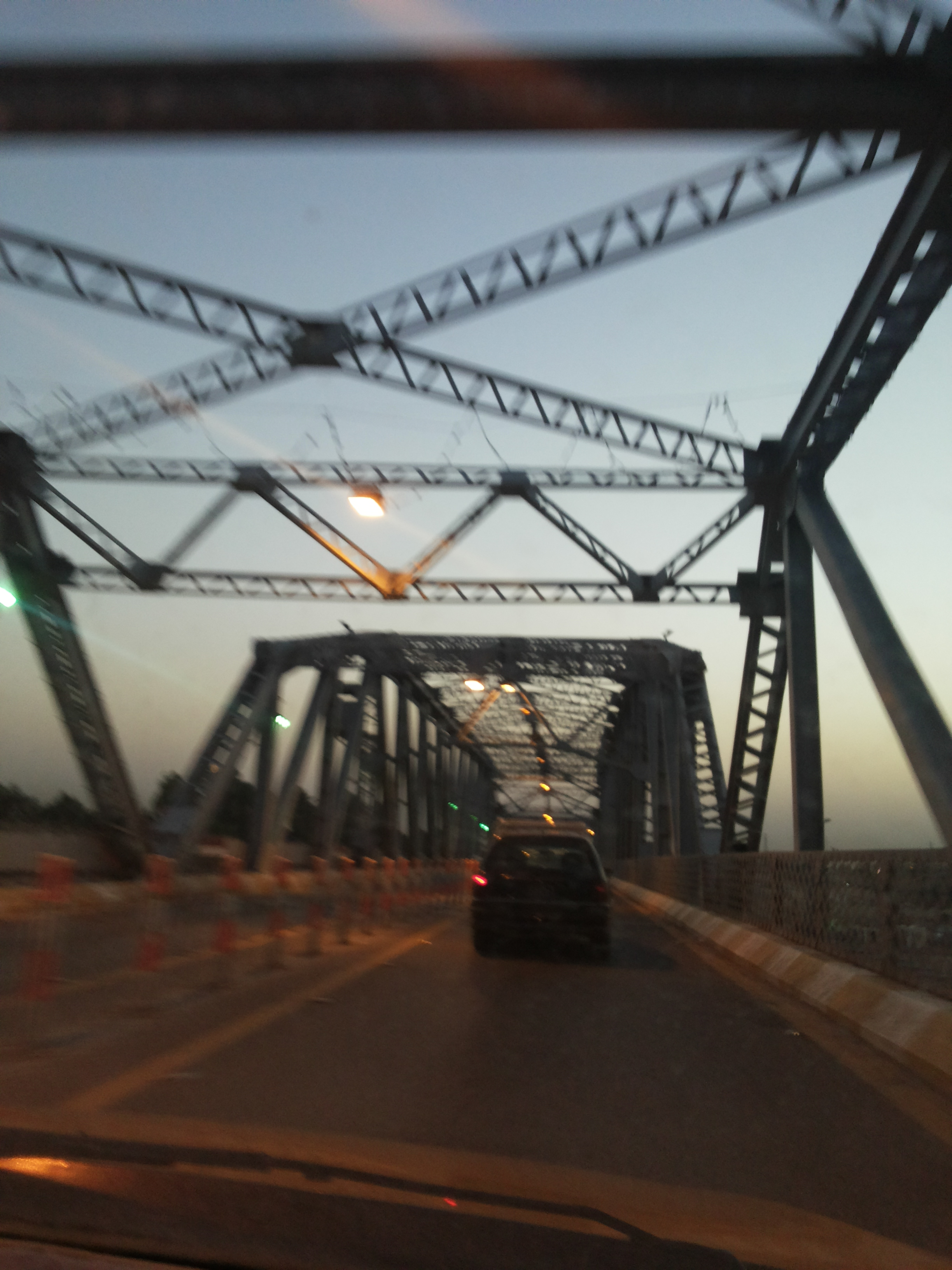
Crossing the Al-sarrafiya bridge in 2013

Al-Sarafiya Bridge Lighting, June 2017

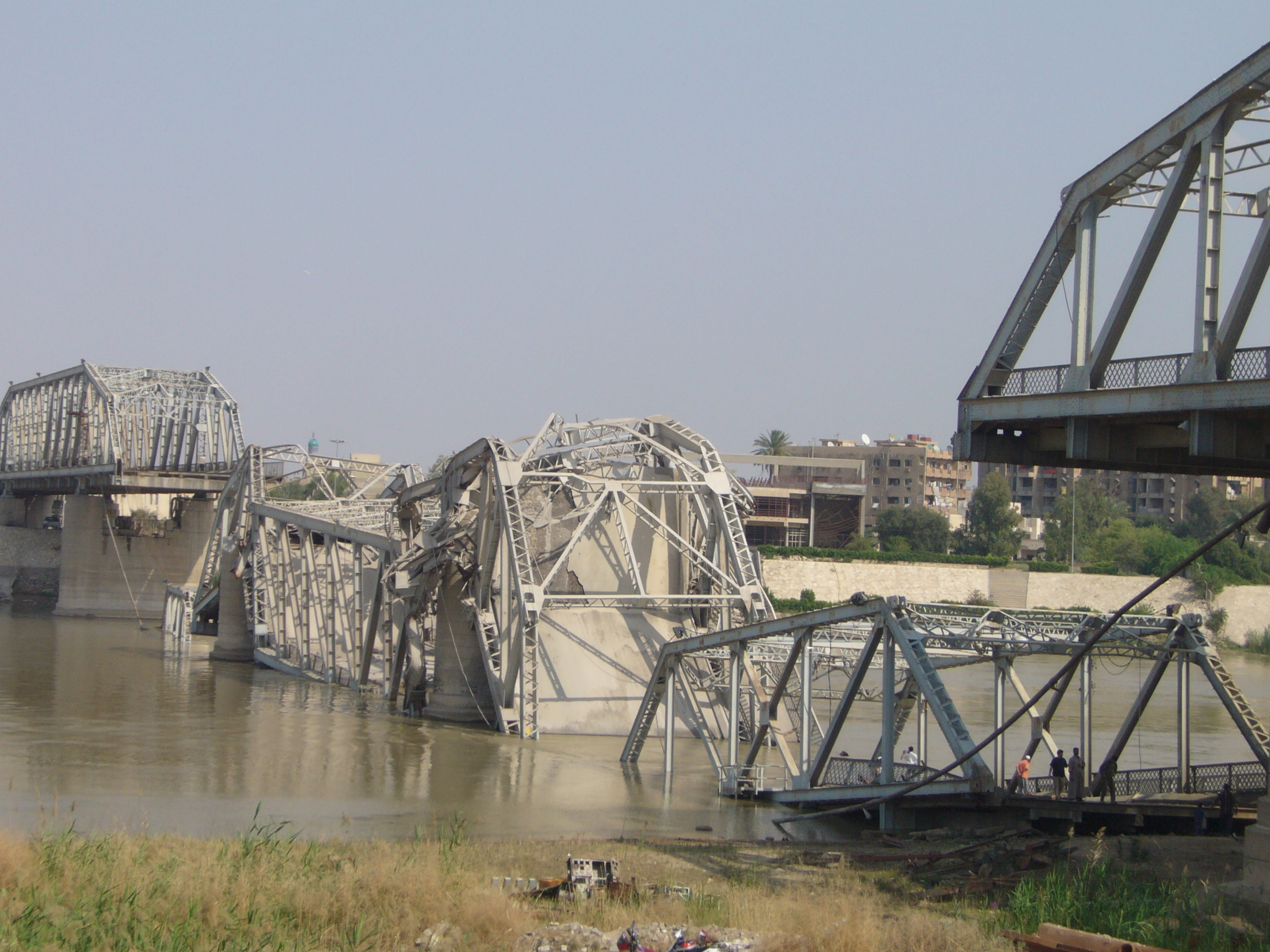
Al-Sarafiya bridge 13 April 2007 after a truck bomb exploded on April 12, 2007

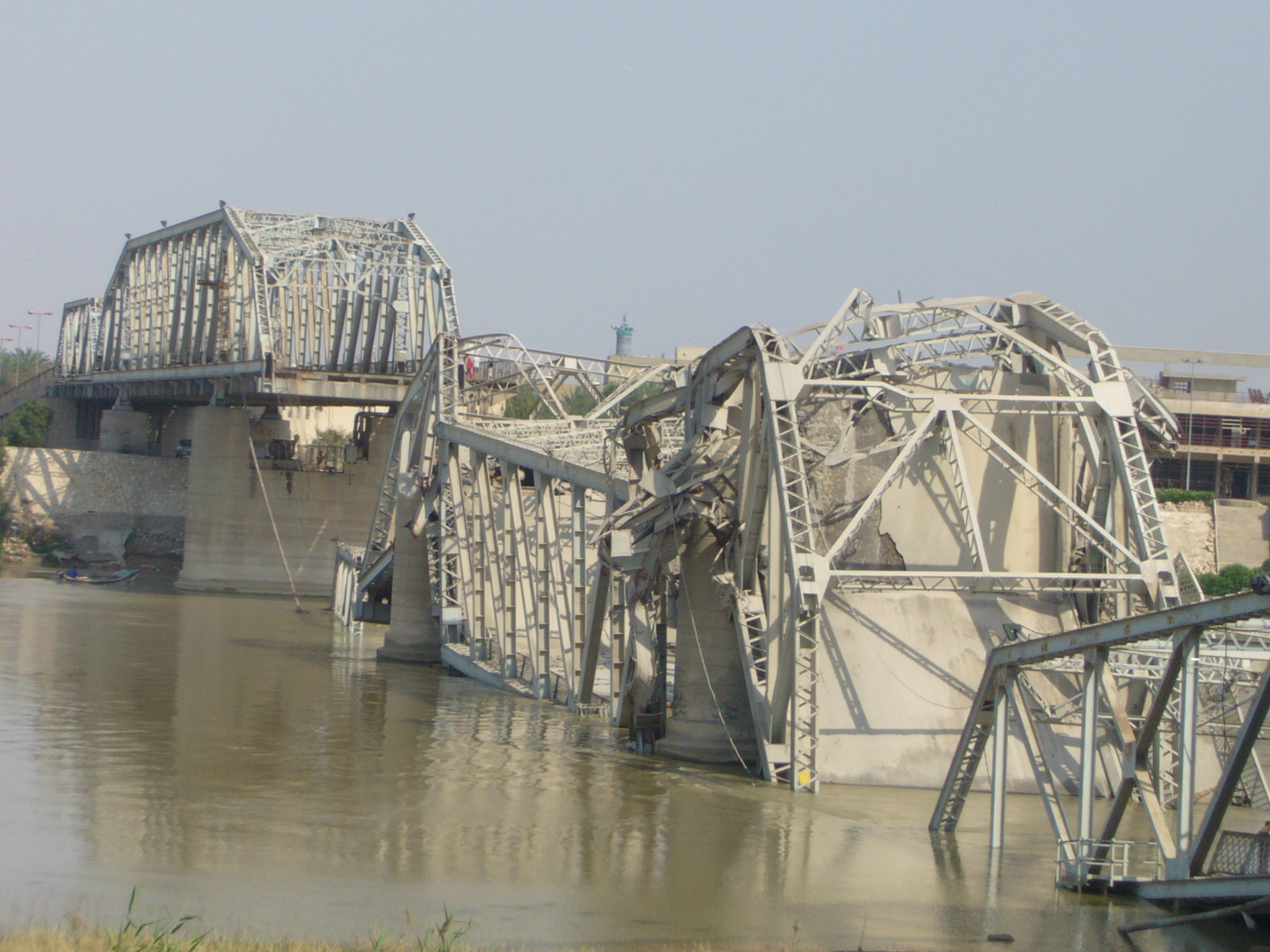
Al-Sarafiya bridge 13 April 2007 after a truck bomb exploded on April 12, 2007
