= Al-Sadr Online =

- Formation: 2008; 18 years ago
- Type: Media Organization
- Headquarters: Najaf, Iraq
- Official language: Arabic, English
- Key people: Muqtada Al-Sadr, Abdul-Jabar Al-Hajami

Al-Sadr Online was the official website of the High Board for Media of Al-Sadr's Office. The High Board is the media organization of Muqtada Al-Sadr, a Shia Muslim Iraqi religious and political leader. The site, which commenced operation in 2007, performs several functions in support of Sadrist objectives. The site's distinct format includes a section in which Al-Sadr offers religious opinions in response to queries from site followers. Al-Sadr Online publishes news about Sadrist political, social, and religious activities in southern Iraq and the Arab world. In addition, the Board's staff also posts commentary on issues pertaining to Iraqi and pan-Arab politics as well as some international news. The site posts numerous links to pages of organizations sympathetic to the Sadrist Movement, many of which are based in Iran and Lebanon. Al-Sadr Online posts most of its content in Arabic, though it does maintain a less robust English page.

== Origins ==
Al-Sadr Online is registered in Najaf, Iraq and has utilized the URL alsadronline.net since 21 August 2008. Previously, Al-Sadr's media organization used the URL alsadronline.com. The site is maintained by the High Board for Media of Al-Sadr's Office, the media of office of Hojatoleslam Muqtada Al-Sadr, the leader of the most prominent branch of the Shia Sadrist movement in Iraq. The High Board for Media is headed by Abdul-Jabar Al-Hajami. Al-Sadr Online is hosted on the NS1.MARAM-IQ.NET and NS2.MARAM-IQ.NET servers. Previous media ventures of Al-Sadr's media organization included the Al-Hawza newspaper which was closed on 28 March 2004 by Combined Joint Task Force 7, the active Ishraqat Al-Sadr newspaper, and the Al-Amarah News Network.

== Content ==
=== Sadrist News ===
The Sadrist News section of Al-Sadr Online provides extensive reporting on the daily activities of Muqtada Al-Sadr's political and cultural organizations. The articles, which generally include photos or illustrations, cover the wide range of community service activities Sadrist organizations organize throughout Iraq, especially in the Shia majority southern provinces. Friday prayer sermons of Sadr-affiliated religious leaders are recounted, as well as messages from Sadrist Council of Representatives members, Cabinet ministers, and other politicians. The site also posts stories covering Shia religious ceremonies and commemorations of the deaths of Sadrist Movement leaders including Muhammad Muhammad Sadeq Al-Sadr, Muhammad Baqir Al-Sadr, and Musa Al-Sadr. Also included are accounts of Sadrist-organized protests and other forms of collective actions intended to influence domestic and international policymakers in Iraq, foreign nations, and international institutions. There is a continuing focus on the activities of the Mumahidun, the social and cultural wing of Al-Sadr's office which was borne out of Sadrist efforts to transition former Jaysh Al-Mahdi members into more mainstream functional roles. Absent from the section are reports of armed actions taken by Sadrist-affiliated groups against Iraqi security forces or United States forces in Iraq.

=== Iraq News ===
The Iraq News section of the website includes reporting and commentary on politics and economic development throughout the country. The section highlights Sadrist officials' roles in Iraq's political process and events in southern Iraq in particular. Stories about problems associated with uneven development in the Iraqi housing, agricultural, and oil sectors are covered regularly, and Sadrist actions to rectify shortcomings in these areas are detailed accordingly. Violence in the form of bombings, assassinations, and kidnappings are reported along with condemnations by the High Board for Politics of Al-Sadr's Office. Arrests of members of Sadrist groups have been criticized as arbitrary detentions. The section tackles issues of corruption in the Iraqi government. The persistent electrical power shortfalls in southern Iraqi provinces are addressed by the site's staff.

=== Arab and World News ===
The Arab and World News section of Al-Sadr online covers world events significant to the Sadrist Movement and to Shia Muslims. The site publishes stories relaying Iranian government statements on the efforts of the United States and some European nations to halt the Iranian nuclear program. The site's staff has made concurrent efforts in this forum to counter accusations that the Sadrist Movement is overly compliant with Iranian political demands, even renouncing Iranian statements regarding Iraqi sovereignty issues on occasion. There are stories critical of Israel and Arab countries with which it maintains relations. The site gives ample coverage to movements demanding greater rights for Shia minorities in nations such as Bahrain, Saudi Arabia, Kuwait, and Yemen. The activities of affiliated political organizations such as Hezbollah are related in this section as well. The site has documented the Arab Spring series of revolutions with stories supportive of dissidents, with those from Syria being the notable exception.

=== Religious Opinions ===
The Religious Opinions column of Al-Sadr online is the official medium for broadcasting Muqtada Al-Sadr's controversial fatwa-like rulings on religious, social, and political issues. Al-Sadr has attained the clerical position of Hojatoleslam, which does not qualify him to render religious opinions (perform Ijtihad) as would an Ayatollah in the traditions of Shia Islamic jurisprudence. Al-Sadr has asserted wide latitude to interpret the previous rulings of his father, Muhammad Muhammad Sadeq Al-Sadr and relate them to contemporary issues. Despite the opposition of many Shia institutions, Muqtada Al-Sadr's rulings are widely accepted by his youthful following. The rulings, which are generally initiated by queries from Al-Sadr followers, provide religious justification for resistance against United States forces in Iraq as well as purging Ba'athist elements from the government. The rulings also clarify Al-Sadr's positions with respect to his support for the State of Law Coalition led by Prime Minister Nouri Al-Maliki. Since 2010, Al-Sadr has taken on social and cultural issues more frequently, with statements advocating restrictions on mixing of genders and prohibition of alcohol among those posted by Al-Sadr Online.

=== Other media ===
Features unique to the Arabic language version of the site include links to affiliate media organizations, video clips of Sadrist commemorations and other events of note, and features on Shia Islamic philosophy. In addition, there are sections detailing the activities of international Sadrist Movement offices. An Interviews and Investigations column posts exchanges with key figures in Iraqi society and examines post-conflict lives of Iraqi citizens.

== Trends in reporting and commentary ==
=== Iraq War era ===
The early years of Al-Sadr Online coincided with the fallout from the Charge of the Knights operation in Basra and other areas of southern Iraq, during which Sadrist militias were expelled from urban areas. During this period, Sadrist Movement leaders shifted the priorities of the organization, transitioning former Jaysh Al-Mahdi fighters into roles supporting the Mumahidun, the social and cultural wing of the party. The reporting on the website reflected this shift, as the activities of the Muhamidun were given ample space on its pages. The movement was also experiencing challenges with breakaway factions such as Asa'ib Ahl Al-Haq, and anti-dissident commentary became more prevalent. Reports on United States Forces' presence in Iraq were harshly critical. The site also provided guidance and context to Sadrist political activities during the run-up to the Iraqi parliamentary elections of 2010 and afterward as political blocs negotiated leadership positions in the government.

=== United States Forces withdrawal from Iraq ===
As United States Forces withdrew from Iraq, Al-Sadr Online addressed a number of challenges and opportunities facing the movement. Negotiations for continuing U.S. military presence in the country failed to establish a status of status of forces agreement which would allow continued cooperation. Al-Sadr Online portrayed residual U.S. political and economic influences in the country as an enduring threat to Iraqi sovereignty. At the same time, the site outlined the Sadrist Movement's plans for demobilizing the armed Promised Day Brigades while maintaining a capability to activate militia members in cases of threats to the organizations agenda. The withdrawal also allowed the Sadrist Movement to renew calls for release of militia members from prisons, and the site's staff wrote pieces advocating for their pardons. Al-Sadr Online began to emphasize coverage of Sadrist education and community service projects during this time period.

=== Post-War ===
The Arab Spring uprisings commencing in early 2011 opened up a new front in the media campaign of the Sadrist Movement. Al-Sadr Online generally was supportive of the rebels in the affected countries for a variety of reasons. Bahrain's sizable Shia minority looked to Iraq for support for its demands for greater political access, and Al-Sadr Online responded with favorable portrayals of Bahraini protesters. The Muammar Qaddafi regime in Libya was suspected of ordering the killing of Muqtada Al-Sadr's relative Musa Al-Sadr, and Libyan rebels received favorable coverage from the site's writers. The insurgency in Yemen included Shia Huthi rebels from the northwestern region of the country, and protesters of the Ali Abdullah Saleh regime received favorable treatment by Al-Sadr Online. The Hosni Mubarak regime's relations with Israel and tense relationship with Iran earned it negative coverage from Al-Sadr Online as Egyptian security forces attempted to quell demonstrations. As demonstrations were violently suppressed in Syria, however, Al-Sadr Online took a different tone similar to that of the Syrian government, pushing for dialogue and resisting calls for regime change. Aside from the Arab Spring coverage, Al-Sadr Online highlighted the Sadrist Movement's efforts to reach out to other religious groups in Iraq, featuring meetings at Christian churches, Mandaean gatherings, and events in Sunni and Kurdish regions. Al-Sadr Online has documented the role that Muqtada Al-Sadr has staked out as an intermediary between Prime Minister Nouri Al-Maliki and Sunni and Kurdish politicians threatening secession of northern provinces from Iraq.
