= Operation Shurta Nasir =

- Part of the Iraq War, Iraqi insurgency, and the Iraqi civil war
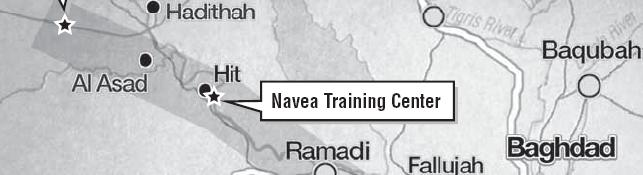
- The location of Hīt in Iraq, and the Navea Training Center.
Date	February 15, 2007
Location	Hīt, Iraq
Result	Coalition Victory

Belligerents
United States (Iraq) Iraqi Police Forces	Islamic State of Iraq

Commanders and leaders
(Iraq) Mayor Hikat (United States) Sergeant Martin Moore	Muhammad Abdul-Karim Sint

Strength
8 U.S. troops, 18 Iraqi SWATs; about 1,000 U.S. troops encircling	Less than 1,000

Casualties and losses
None	Several captured, few killed

Operation Shurta Nasir or Operation Police Victory or the Battle of Hīt was an operation led by U.S. troops and Iraqi SWAT teams trying to capture the town of Hīt from Islamic State of Iraq forces. The goal of the mission was to eject the Islamic State of Iraq from the city and establish three police stations there to cement authority in the town. The Islamic State of Iraq retreating would be caught in the net of encircling U.S. troops which numbered 1,000 men. The operation was a success, and Hīt was captured and freed from the terrorists.

== The trouble with Hīt ==
Hīt was home to 80,000 people at the time of the Iraq War. When Al-Qaeda captured the town, they implanted IEDs in the highways leading into Hīt. U.S. troops tried unsuccessfully to capture Hīt; Islamic State of Iraq was able to defend the town. Sheikh Hikat, former leader of Hīt, was frustrated by the lack of progress in recapturing the town. He met with Sergeant Martin Moore of the 5th Special Forces Group and Moore came up with an idea called Operation Shurta Nasir, or "Operation Police Victory." The operation was named for the Iraqi SWAT teams that would help U.S. troops re-take the town.

== Operation Shurta Nasir ==
When the operation proceeded, 1,000 U.S. troops encircled Hīt, waiting for the task force of 26 men to make Islamic State of Iraq to run into the U.S. net lurking outside the town. Muhammad Sint, a wanted Islamic State of Iraq leader, was in the town with his entourage of Islamic State of Iraq troops. The task force moved into the town, and dismantled locked gates with explosives. Sammy, the Arabic translator for Sergeant Moore, told the citizens to hide and take cover.

U.S. troops moved into a house, and saw two Islamic State of Iraq soldiers masquerading as college students. They were arrested, but would only be fully incarcerated when a police station was built. 25 Iraqi policemen and 11 U.S. Marines were sent to reinforce the task force. The U.S. troops moved out, and engaged Islamic State of Iraq in street fighting. Mohammed Sint escaped the fighting and took flight. The town was secured, and the retreating Islamic State of Iraq, save for Sint, were killed or captured by the net.

== Aftermath ==
With Hīt secure, three police stations were built. The IEDs were disarmed, and Hīt was secure. However, there was more fighting to come in later years, and the city shifted to Iraqi Government control. The town of Hīt was safe, but Sint was not captured yet. He was still wanted and would reportedly only be captured in September 2007. Later, General David Petraeus, the top American commander in Iraq, walked the streets of Hīt without wearing a helmet or body armor while eating ice cream, and wasn't imperiled at all. This proved Hīt's security and safety.
