= Jamal Abdul Karim al-Dabban =

Sheik Jamal Abdul Karim al-Dabban (Arabic: جمال عبدالكريم الدبان) (c. 1939 – 17 June 2007) was a moderate Sunni cleric in the city of Tikrit, Iraq.

al-Dabban was the senior Sunni religious leader between July 2004 and his death. He was a moderate Sunni leader with no links to insurgent groups.

On June 24, 2006 he was arrested along with his two sons by the United States Army in Iraq on suspicion of being a terrorist. After mass protest by Iraqi people in Tikrit the American authorities apologized and released him.

al-Dabban died on 17 June 2007 from a heart attack.
