= Saleh al-Ogaili =

Iraqi politician

- Died: October 9, 2008; Habibiyah District, Sadr City, Baghdad, Iraq
- Cause of death: Severe head wounds resulting from bomb attack
- Occupation: Member of the Council of Representatives of Iraq

Saleh al-Ogaili (died October 9, 2008) was an Iraqi Member of Parliament who was killed (along with two other people) when a bomb, placed on a motorcycle, exploded next to his convoy in 2008 in Habibiyah district, Sadr City, Baghdad.

== Political position ==
Ogaili was considered to belong to the Sadr block in Iraq's Parliament.

Speaking a year before his assassination, Ogaili expressed qualified support for the government of Prime Minister Nouri al-Maliki:

"The Sadr bloc does not seek to change the prime minister....We don't believe in pulling out from the united Shiite alliance. We do not claim that this alliance is the best, but it is the best among what is available now."
