= Sahar Hussein al-Haideri =

Iraqi journalist (1962–2007)

- Born: July 15, 1962; Baghdad, Iraq
- Died: June 7, 2007 (aged 44); Mosul, Iraq
- Cause of death: Murder by shooting
- Education: University of Baghdad (1980–1997)
- Occupation: Journalist
- Spouse: Haithem al-Naqib (m. 1997)

Sahar Hussein al-Haideri (Arabic: سحر حسين الحيدري, July 15, 1962 – June 7, 2007) was an Iraqi female print and radio journalist. She was murdered by extremists on June 7, 2007, becoming at the time the 108th journalist, including the 86th Iraqi journalist, to be killed covering the Iraq War since its outbreak in 2003.

== Early life ==
Al-Haideri was born in Baghdad, Iraq, to a Shia professional family. She was educated and received her degree in business administration from Baghdad University.

Al-Haideri married Haithem al-Naqib, a Sunni teacher from the northern Iraqi city of Mosul. Together the couple had four daughters. The family moved to Mosul in 1997.

== Career ==
Al-Haideri's career in journalism began after the 2003 invasion of Iraq and the fall of Sadam Hussein's Baathist regime. A number of international news training programs were set up by media agencies throughout Iraq, including the IWPR, the Reuters Foundation and others. Al-Haideri was one of the few Iraqis to enroll in the IWPR journalism reporting and training program. The programs offered aspiring Iraqi journalists a new career direction.

Al-Haideri began work as a radio and print journalist. She began writing contributing pieces for the Institute for War and Peace Reporting, the media organization with whom she had been trained. She also wrote for local Iraqi press, including the Aswat al-Iraq news agency, known in English as the Voices of Iraq, a Mosul-based newspaper. Her stories focused on the trauma that was beginning to overtake Iraq. Her stories included features on the increasing violence against Iraqi women, and what she called the "lost generation" of Iraqi youth due to the war. Her stories were sometimes critical of both local Iraqi government officials and the U.S. Forces, both of whom she saw as adding to the chaotic situation in Iraq. However, she was most critical of Islamic extremists who sought to use the war as an excuse to turn her adopted city of Mosul into a fundamentalist "emirate" in northern Iraq.

Her stories increasingly focused on the fundamentalists and the violence that their insurgency had brought to northern Iraq (excluding Iraqi Kurdistan). She wrote pieces concerning Islamic fundamentalist decrees that cucumbers and tomatoes must be served on separate plates because they are supposedly of different genders and that female store mannequins must have their heads covered. She also wrote of the atrocities committed by Iraqi insurgents.

Her critical reporting put her personal safety, as well as her family, in jeopardy. Al-Haideri was once saved from an attempted kidnapping because an American military patrol happened to be in the area and stopped the attack. At one point, an Iraqi extremist group linked to al Qaeda placed Al-Haideri at number four on a hit list of so-called infidels.

Al-Haideri moved her family to Damascus, Syria, in 2006 for their own safety. However, she continued to return to Iraq to file her reports. Al-Haideri, who was very committed to her chosen career, said in a 2007 interview with the UK Press Gazette that she never thought about quitting, even under the constant threats. She took credit on a Kurdish website for a number of news articles critical of the extremists which had been written and published under an assumed pseudonym. The editors of both the Voices of Iraq and the IWPR repeatedly implored al-Haideri to remain in Syria and stay out of Iraq for her own personal safety.

Al-Haideri was killed in Mosul on June 7, 2007, by an extremist group called the Ansar al-Sunna. She was 45 years old. Her news editors had spent three hours the day before her killing asking her to return to Damascus. Her murder was met with condemnation from the international community.

The IWPR established a journalist assistance fund in memory of al-Haideri and the work she accomplished during her career as a journalist.

In 2008 Al-Haideri was awarded posthumously the Amnesty International Media Award, for the use of new media in her work. Her article Arabic: القتل غسلا للعار يثير مخاوف تفجر صراع عراقي جديد, "Honour Killing Sparks Fears of New Iraqi Conflict" was specifically cited by the judges.

Al-Haideri was survived by her husband and her four daughters, who were aged 11 to 17 at the time of her murder.
