= Battle of Haifa Street =

2007 battle for control of Haifa Street in Baghdad, Iraq

The Battle of Haifa Street
- Part of the Iraq War, Iraqi insurgency, and the Iraqi civil war
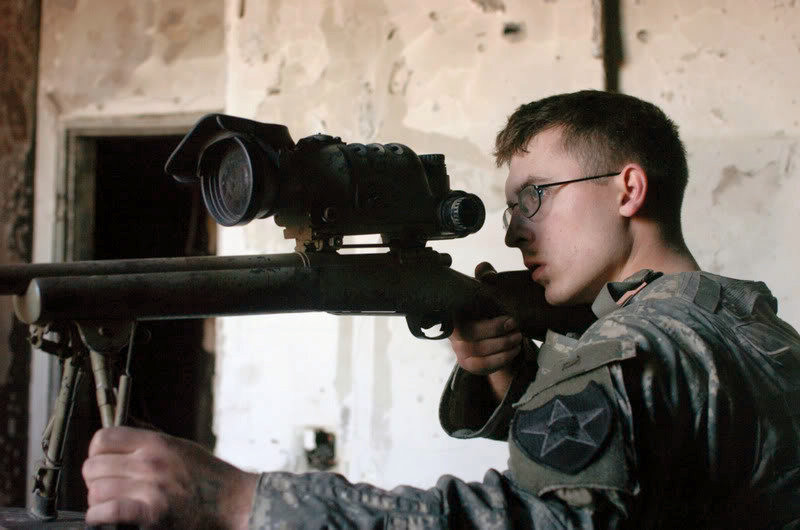
- A U.S. sniper of the 2nd Infantry Division takes up a position during the fighting
Date	6–24 January 2007 (2 weeks and 4 days)
Location	Baghdad, Iraq
Result	First Phase: Insurgent ambush Second Phase: (United States) (Iraq) Allied victory

Belligerents
United States; Iraq	Islamic State of Iraq; Other Iraqi insurgents

Strength
(Iraq) 500 soldiers (United States) 400 soldiers	Unknown

Casualties and losses
(Iraq) 347+ killed (United States) 1 killed	200 killed 35 captured

The Battle of Haifa Street was fought during January 2007 for the control of Haifa Street, a two-mile-long street in downtown Baghdad, Iraq, pitting American and Iraqi Army forces against various Sunni insurgent forces between January 6 and January 9, 2007 (phase one), and then two weeks later on January 24 when US forces launched a second attempt to clear Haifa Street of insurgents once and for all. This battle was the precursor for clearing operations that would set the conditions for "the surge" which ultimately neutralized insurgent groups in this part of Baghdad during the spring and summer of 2007.

== Background ==
Haifa Street runs through a majority-Sunni area, although there is an area of Shi'ite-dominated neighborhoods to the west, making the Haifa Street area a sectarian fault line between Shi'ite and Sunni neighborhoods. As a result, brutal killings by both sides drove the residents of the high-rise buildings out of the area, enabling insurgents to take over abandoned apartments.

In mid-October 2006, al-Qaeda announced the creation of Islamic state of Iraq (ISI), replacing the Mujahideen Shura Council (MSC) and its al-Qaeda in Iraq (AQI).

In January 2007, the commander of Multi National Corps-Iraq (MNC-I), General Odierno, ordered a full-scale offensive to dislodge al Qaida from what one US commander called "the most dangerous street in Iraq".

== Two-phase battle ==
=== Phase one (January 6 to 9) ===
On January 6, 2007, Iraqi soldiers on patrol along Haifa Street discovered a fake checkpoint manned by Sunni insurgents. A gun battle followed in which 3-5/6 Iraqi Army forces with embedded US MiTT (4-9 Cav) forces killed 30 insurgents. That night in retaliation, insurgents dumped the bodies of 27 executed Shi'ites. The next day, insurgent snipers killed 2 Iraqi security guards near a neighborhood mosque. On January 8, Iraqi forces attempted to remove insurgent forces from Haifa Street, but the attack was repulsed and 2 Iraqi soldiers were killed. US forces were then called in to help clear out the street.

On the January 9, 2007, American and Iraqi forces began a joint operation. The US 1st Battalion of the 23rd Infantry Regiment under the command and control of Colonel (Brigadier General) Bryan T. Roberts, Commander, 2nd Black Jack Brigade, 1st Cavalry Division, linked up with Iraqi forces on the north end of Haifa street and began occupying buildings and arresting suspects. At 7:00am hundreds of insurgents started to shoot at the Americans from the high-rises (the Holland Apartments). Heavy incoming fire pinned down the American soldiers trapping them on a rooftop for at least two hours. Some soldiers who were not on the rooftop could not move on the street because of sniper and machine-gun fire. The fighting became so intense that US Apache helicopters, F-15E Strike Eagles, more than a dozen Iraqi gun trucks, Stryker combat vehicles and about 1,000 Iraqi Army soldiers were called in.

The battle was some of the fiercest fighting the Iraqi capital had seen in months (since Operation Together Forward). US helicopters fired Hellfire missiles at insurgent positions while fighter jets provided additional cover. Thunderous explosions were heard throughout Baghdad from U.S. missile and insurgent mortar and rocket-propelled grenade fire. U.S. and Iraqi soldiers engaged in running battles with insurgents up and down Haifa Street. The fighting lasted for over three days. 16 Iraqi soldiers and 73 insurgents were killed.

=== Phase two (January 24) ===
Two weeks later on January 24, the American and Iraqi forces made a new attempt to capture Haifa Street. The battle began when American forces of the 1-23 Infantry (3rd Stryker Brigade Combat Team, 2nd Infantry Division) entered the area from the south in the early morning on the 24th and linked up with Iraqi forces from 1st Battalion 1st Brigade 6th Iraqi Division, and US forces from 4/9 Cav of the 2nd BCT of the 1st Cavalry Division. Using infantry, Strykers and Bradleys, American forces moved from building to building, taking sniper and mortar fire. The fighting lasted 8 hours. Some 30 insurgents were killed and 35 captured. 1 American soldier, SSG Hector Leija was also killed.

== Aftermath ==
Approximately 500 Iraqi and 400 U.S. soldiers took part in the battle along a two-mile stretch of Haifa Street. The images of the fighting were shown across the world on various news media, including YouTube, which coincided with President George W. Bush's speech about committing more than 21,000 extra U.S. troops to Iraq. President Bush argued that the additional soldiers will help to secure Baghdad, but on the ground there were signs that problems were yet to come.

Within 24 hours of the start of the fight in Haifa Street, Gen. Razzak Hamza, a Sunni Iraqi Army commander of the Fifth Brigade, 6th Iraqi Division, was relieved of duty by the Shiite Prime Minister Nuri al-Maliki, and replaced by a Shiite commander. It was reported that the prime minister blamed Hamza for the violence on Haifa Street, and said he was not doing enough to stop it. It was believed that the meddling from the prime minister's office was driven by sectarian motives, in part because Razzak had been putting pressure on the Shiite militias. The interference by the Maliki administration raised questions about whether government leaders are truly willing to put Iraq's sectarian differences aside.

This was one of the few battles where the insurgents and the coalition troops have fought each other 'face-to-face'.

== Media coverage ==
=== Lara Logan report ===
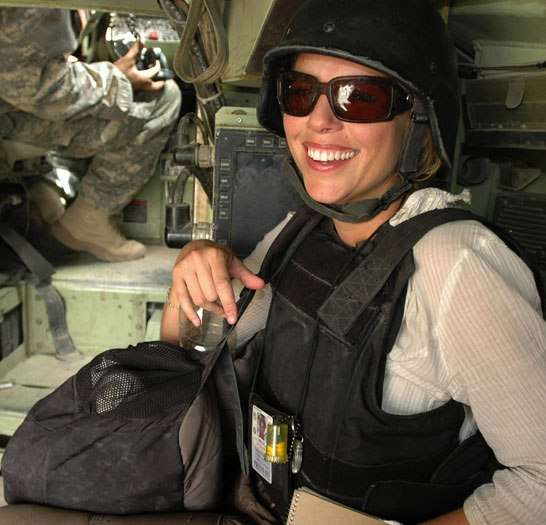
CBS News correspondent Lara Logan in Iraq. US Army photo.

In late January 2007, CBS News correspondent Lara Logan filed a report about fighting along Haifa Street in Baghdad. When CBS News refused to run the report on the nightly news because the footage was "a bit strong". Logan tried to win public support to reverse this decision. Logan said, "I would be very grateful if any of you have a chance to watch this story and pass the link on to as many people you know as possible. It should be seen. And people should know about this." Logan went on to use some of the Haifa Street material during a 60 Minutes report about life in Baghdad under the surge.
