= Raja Nawaf Farhan al-Mahalawi =

Governor Raja Nawaf Farhan al-Mahalawi رجا نواف فرحان المحلاوي

Governor of Anbar
- In office January 2005 – 29 May 2005
- Appointed by: Anbar Provincial Council (PC)
- Preceded by: Faisal Raikan al-Gut al-Nimrawi (acting)
- Succeeded by: Maamoon Sami Rasheed al-Alwani

Personal details
- Died: 29 May 2005 Rawah, Anbar, Iraq
- Occupation: Politician

Raja Nawaf Farhan al-Mahalawi (Arabic: رجا نواف فرحان المحلاوي) was the Governor of Iraq's Al Anbar province, serving from January 2005 until his death in May 2005.

== Early life and pre-war career ==
Mahalawi was originally from Qaim in Al Anbar Governorate. He served as Mayor of the town during the tenure of Saddam Hussein.

== Governorship ==
Following the resignation of Abd al-Karim Barjas in July 2004, an interim governor filled the role of Governor of Anbar. Faisal Raikan al-Gut al-Nimrawi served as interim Governor until being forced out by tribal leaders in January 2005, and the Provincial Governing Council subsequently appointed al-Mahalawi as the new Governor.

== Kidnapping and death ==
Mahalawi was kidnapped near Qaim on the morning of Tuesday 10 May 2005, whilst driving between Qaim and Ramadi. Qaim was at the time the scene of intense fighting between US Forces and insurgents, with the fighting in Qaim being called a victory for the insurgents by Abu Musab al-Zarqawi, the leader of Al-Qaeda in Iraq.

Following his kidnapping his abductors announced that they would hold him until US Forces pulled out of Qaim, however Lieutenant-Colonel Steven Boylan, a spokesman for US forces in Iraq, said: "We don't respond to insurgent or terrorist demands." Relatives of Mahalawi along with a government official announced that Mahalawi had been released on 15 May, although this later proved to be incorrect. Mahalawi was later handed to a different kidnapper cell.

On 29 May, US Forces in Rawah came under heavy RPG and automatic rifle fire from Al-Qaeda in Iraq insurgents in a farmhouse. The US forces returned fire, killing 4 of the fighters and wounding 3 others. Mahalawi's body was then found inside the house. The body was found blindfolded and chained to a gas cylinder, and had suffered from a blow to the head. Mahalawi hadn't been shot, but had instead seemingly been killed by a falling piece of rubble that had fallen on him during the firefight. His body was identified by family members in Qaim on 30 May, and his death announced by Laith Kuba, a Government Spokesperson, on Tuesday 31 May.

Of the four fighters killed by the US during the firefight 2 were from Syria, 1 from Algeria, and 1 from Jordan. Of the three injured 2 were Saudis, and 1 was a Moroccan.

Following al-Mahalawi's death the Provincial Council elected Maamoon Sami Rasheed al-Alwani as his successor.
