= Hisham al-Hashimi =

Iraqi historian and researcher (1973–2020)

- هشام الهاشمي
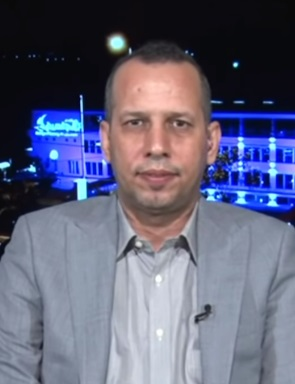
- al-Hashimi in 2020
- Born: 9 May 1973; Baghdad, Ba'athist Iraq
- Died: 6 July 2020 (aged 47); Baghdad, Iraq
- Cause of death: Gunshot wounds
- Resting place: Wadi-us-Salaam, Al-Najaf, Iraq
- Education: University of Baghdad
- Occupations: Historian and researcher in security and strategic affairs

Hisham al-Hashimi (Arabic: هشام الهاشمي; 9 May 1973 – 6 July 2020) was an Iraqi historian and researcher in security and strategic affairs and extremist groups, and a specialist on the subject of the Islamic State and its supporters. He also was an advisor to the Iraqi government on counter-terrorism.

== Biography ==
Al-Hashimi was born in 1973 in Baghdad. He became a historian and researcher in security and strategic affairs. He was a follower of the Iraqi Islamic groups since 1997. He worked in the field of modern and "jurisprudential" manuscripts, although his academic achievement was Bachelor of Economics and Administration - Statistics Department. He held a scientific degree in Hadith, and had an interest in the history of Al-Dhahabi. He was arrested and sentenced to prison by Saddam Hussein's regime, due to his affiliation with Salafi jihadism, then he was released from prison in 2002. After 2003, he went to work in the press, began writing reports and documents with foreign newspapers and channels, and began writing a blog about the map of armed groups in Iraq. He published more than 500 articles and research in Iraqi and Arab newspapers and magazines about extremist groups. On 1 July 2020, he published a report titled "The internal dispute within the Popular Mobilization Forces", his last work before his assassination.

== Assassination ==
On 6 July 2020, al-Hashimi was shot outside his home in Zayouna, Baghdad by two unidentified gunmen on a motorcycle. He died in the nearby Ibn Al-Nafees hospital shortly after arrival. In July 2020, a BBC investigation said Kata'ib Hezbollah was implicated in al-Hashimi's death.

He was buried at Wadi-us-Salaam, Al-Najaf, Iraq.

== Aftermath ==
Al-Hashimi's death triggered an uproar in Iraq and among the larger international community, leading to allegations accusing paramilitary groups such as Kata'ib Hezbollah and the Islamic State, while the official investigation has not accused any group, and no group claimed responsibility. However, Al-Hashimi had reportedly received direct death and kidnapping threats from members and commanders within Kata'ib Hezbollah and the Popular Mobilization Forces.

On 8 July 2020, Iraqi Prime Minister Mustafa Al-Kadhimi visited the family of al-Hashimi—his wife, three sons, and daughter—to offer his condolences. He described al-Hashimi as "a personal friend and adviser" and hailed him as a "hero," vowing to bring those responsible for his death to justice.

In July 2021, four men were arrested including former police officer Ahmed Hamdawi Owayid al-Kinani who confessed that he assassinated al-Hashimi with a licensed gun, as he had previously worked in the Ministry of Interior. In May 2023, a court in Baghdad sentenced al-Kinani to death for the murder of al-Hashimi. Al-Kinani's conviction was later overturned by an appellate court and he was released in 2024; it is unknown what the grounds for acquittal were.

== Places of work ==
- Director of the National Security and Counterterrorism Program at the AKD Center for Strategic Studies and Research.
- Security Adviser to the Iraqi Journalists Syndicate.
- Member of the Scientific Committee of the Baghdad Conference on Combating Terrorism.
- Lecturer in combating terrorism in security academies.
- Visiting Scholar at the Rivers Center for Strategic Studies.
- Member of the team of advisors of the Committee for the Implementation and Follow-up of National Reconciliation in the Office of the Prime Minister of Iraq.
- Security Adviser to the Iraqi Journalistic Freedoms Observatory.

== Publications ==
- Alem Daesh
- History of al-Qaeda in Iraq
- organization of the Islamic State from within
