= 2007 Iraqi Parliament bombing =

Terrorist attack in Baghdad, Iraq

- Part of the Iraq War, Iraqi insurgency, and the Iraqi civil war
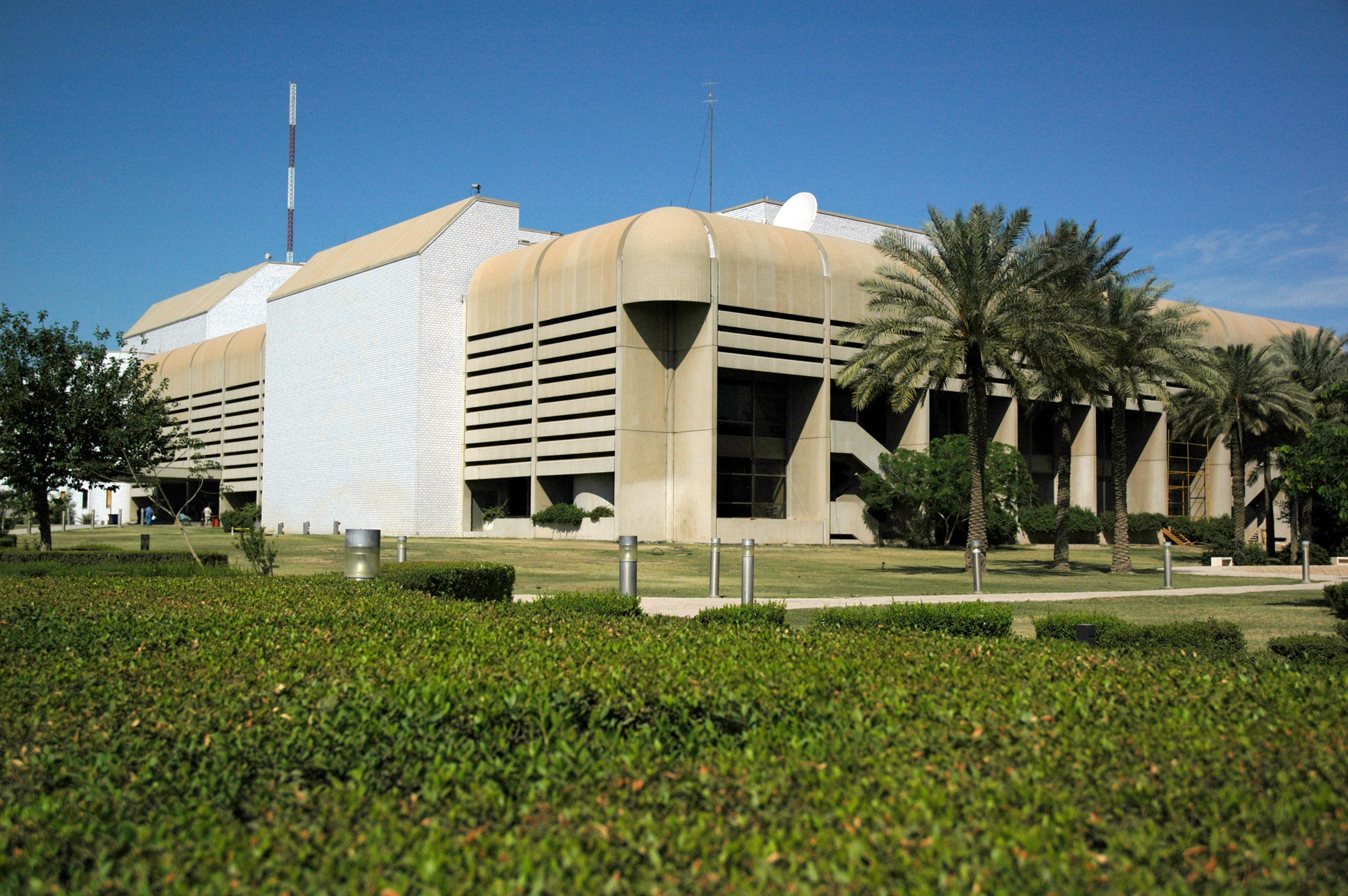
- Location: 33.3151°N 44.3638°E; Council of Representatives of Iraq, Baghdad
- Date: 12 April 2007
- Target: Politicians
- Attack type: Suicide bombing
- Deaths: 1/8 (+1)
- Injuries: 23
- Perpetrator: Islamic State of Iraq (claimed)

On 12 April 2007, the canteen of the Council of Representatives of Iraq building was attacked by a suicide bomber, killing one to eight people and wounding 23 others. The attack, in the heavily fortified Green Zone of Baghdad, occurred ten minutes after the Council of Representatives had adjourned for lunch. It was on the first floor of the Baghdad Convention Center, which houses the parliament. Two further unexploded suicide vests were found near the canteen. The building had earlier been searched by dogs – very rare considering dogs are considered ritually unclean by Iraqis – suggesting the authorities suspected an attack was imminent. Following the attack the government closed down mobile phone networks and Apache helicopters flew overhead.

== Casualties ==
The US military reported on 13 April that only MP Mohammed Awad had died, and that 22 others were wounded.

Early reports however had said that eight people were killed, including three MPs, and at least 23 people were reported wounded. The MPs named were Mohammed Awad, a member of the Iraqi National Dialogue Front, Taha al-Liheibi, a member of the Iraqi Accordance Front and an unnamed Kurdish MP.

== Responsibility ==
Suspicions initially centered on the bomber having been the bodyguard of an MP. A government spokesman said "there are some groups that work in politics during the day and do things other than politics at night". Member of Parliament Mohammed al-Dayni accused the government of lax security at the site.

On 13 April, the Islamic State of Iraq posted a message on an Islamist website claiming to have sent "A knight from the state of Islam ... [into] the heart of the Green Zone" to carry out the attack. It is not clear whether this claim is genuine, though some who monitor such websites believe it is.

In February 2009, two bodyguards of Iraqi National Dialogue Front MP Mohammed al-Dayni were arrested on suspicion of the attacks. Alaa Khairallah Hashim, al-Dayni's security chief and Ryadh Ibrahim al-Dayni, Mohammed al-Dayni's nephew, confessed on television to involvement in several attacks, including the parliament bombing. They said the MP had given authorisation for the bomber to enter the parliament area. The security forces asked the Council of Representatives of Iraq to lift al-Dayni's parliamentary immunity. Mohammed al-Dayni claimed that the accusations were lies and that his bodyguards had been tortured into making a false confession because he had been disclosing human rights abuses in Iraqi prisons. al-Dayni took a flight to Jordan, but the aeroplane was forced to turn back; parliament then agreed to lift his immunity.

== Reactions ==
When the bombing occurred, Saleh al-Mutlaq, the head of oppositional Iraqi National Dialogue Front, the party of the killed MP Awad, called on the United States to overthrow the government of Nouri al-Maliki: "We need America to realize that this pro-Iranian government it has installed has allowed interference on the side of one against the other".

The Iraqi Council of Representatives held an emergency assembly the following day in response to the bombing, to "show resilience in the face of such attacks".

US President George W. Bush condemned the attacks, saying "there is an enemy willing to bomb innocent people and a symbol of democracy". The Iranian Foreign Minister, Mohammad Ali Hosseini described the attack as "inhumane and satanic ... target[ting] both its Shia and Sunni officials"

Four days later three Ministers from the Sadrist Movement quit the government, citing, among other things, the growing insecurity in Baghdad.

== See also ==
- 2007 suicide bombings in Iraq
- List of attacks on legislatures
