= Fasal al Gaood =

Iraqi politician

Fasal al Gaood فصال القعود

Governor of Anbar _{(Acting)}
- In office July 2004 – January 2005
- Preceded by: Abd al-Karim Barjas
- Succeeded by: Raja Nawaf Farhan al-Mahalawi

Personal details
- Died: 25 June 2007 Mansour Hotel, Baghdad, Iraq

Sheikh Faisal Raikan al-Gut al-Nimrawi (Arabic: فصال القعود; died 25 June 2007), also known as Fasal al Gaood (Arabic: فصال القعود), was a Governor of Anbar, Iraq and an important Iraqi Sunni Muslim ally of the United States. He served as interim governor of the province from July 2004 to January 2005.

Fasal al Gaood helped to form an umbrella group of tribal Sunni leaders called the Anbar Salvation Council. The goal of the organization was to ally themselves with U.S. forces against Al Qaeda insurgents in Sunni regions of Iraq, such as Al Anbar. The council had been unfortunately torn by infighting.

Al Gaood was killed on June 25, 2007, in a suicide bombing blast at the Mansour Hotel in Baghdad along with 11 others. Six of those killed, including al Gaood, were members of the Anbar Salvation Council, who were meeting at the hotel at the time. Investigators believe that the Sunni tribal leaders were the targets. The blast also killed Rahim al-Maliki, a prominent Iraqi poet and television producer for Al-Iraqiya TV.
