= Report to Congress on the Situation in Iraq =

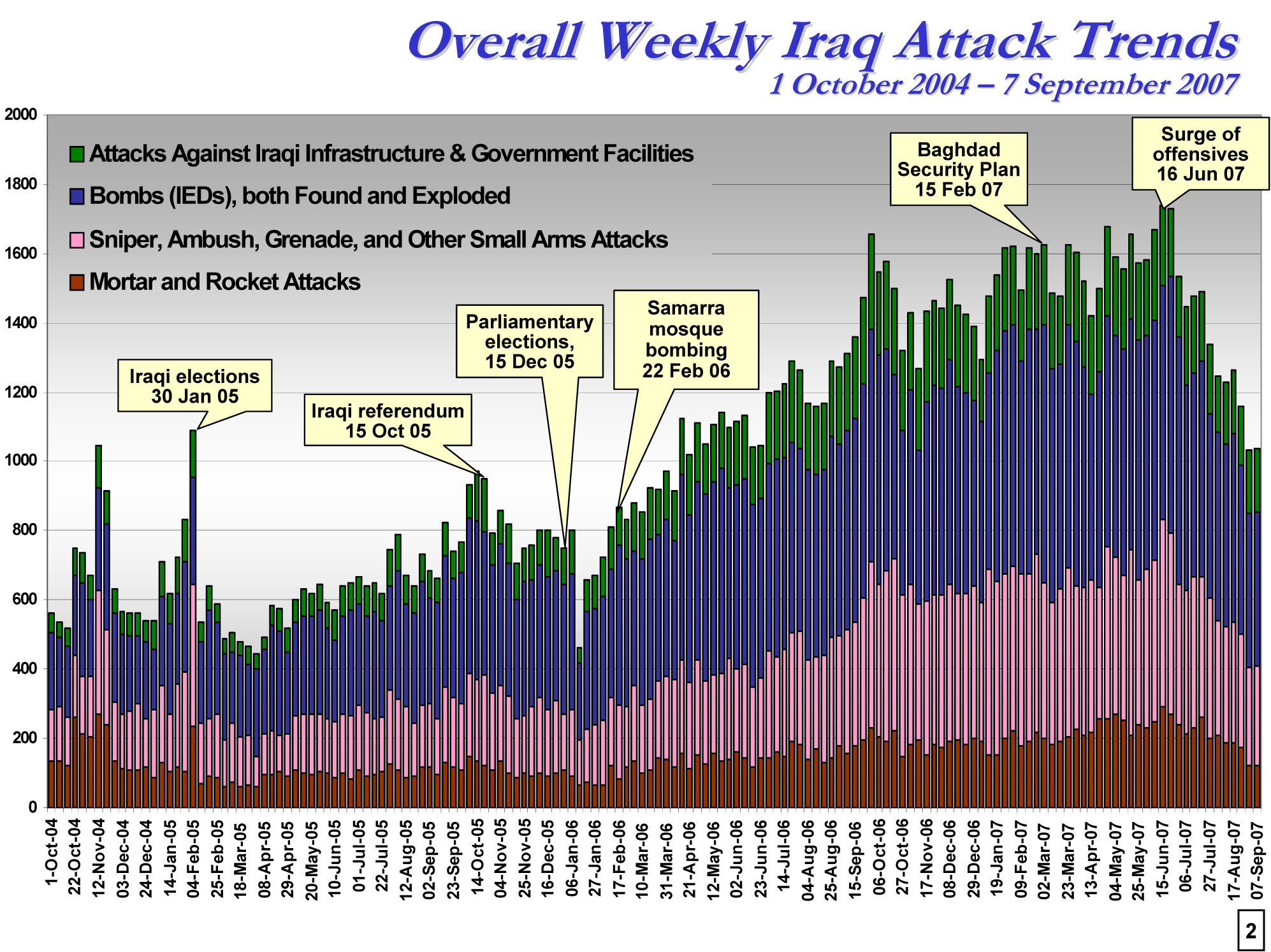
The decline in attacks after surge operations fully commenced stated in the report, taken from the US Department of Defense website.

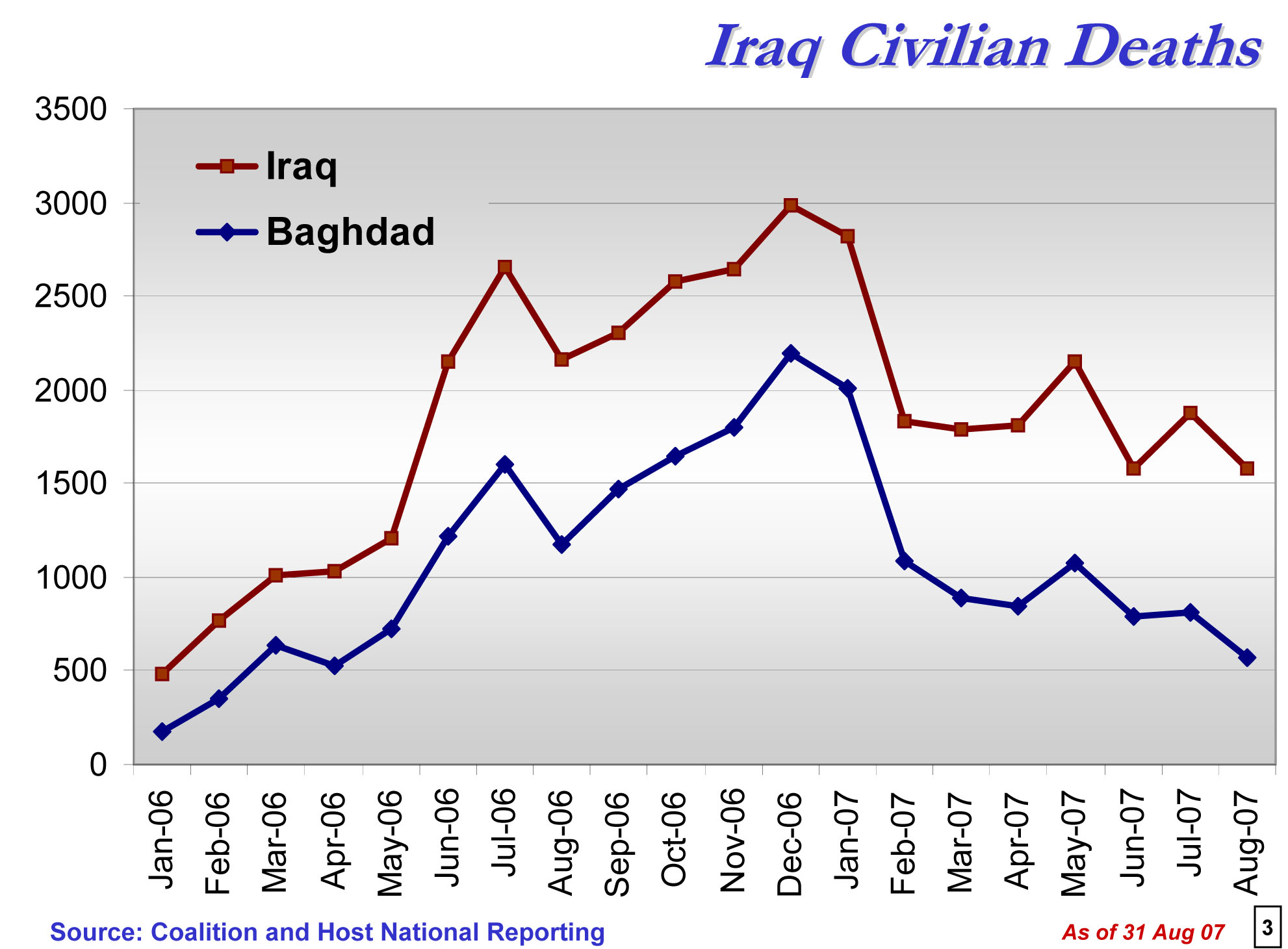
The decline in civilian deaths since the start of the surge stated in the report, taken from the US Department of Defense website.

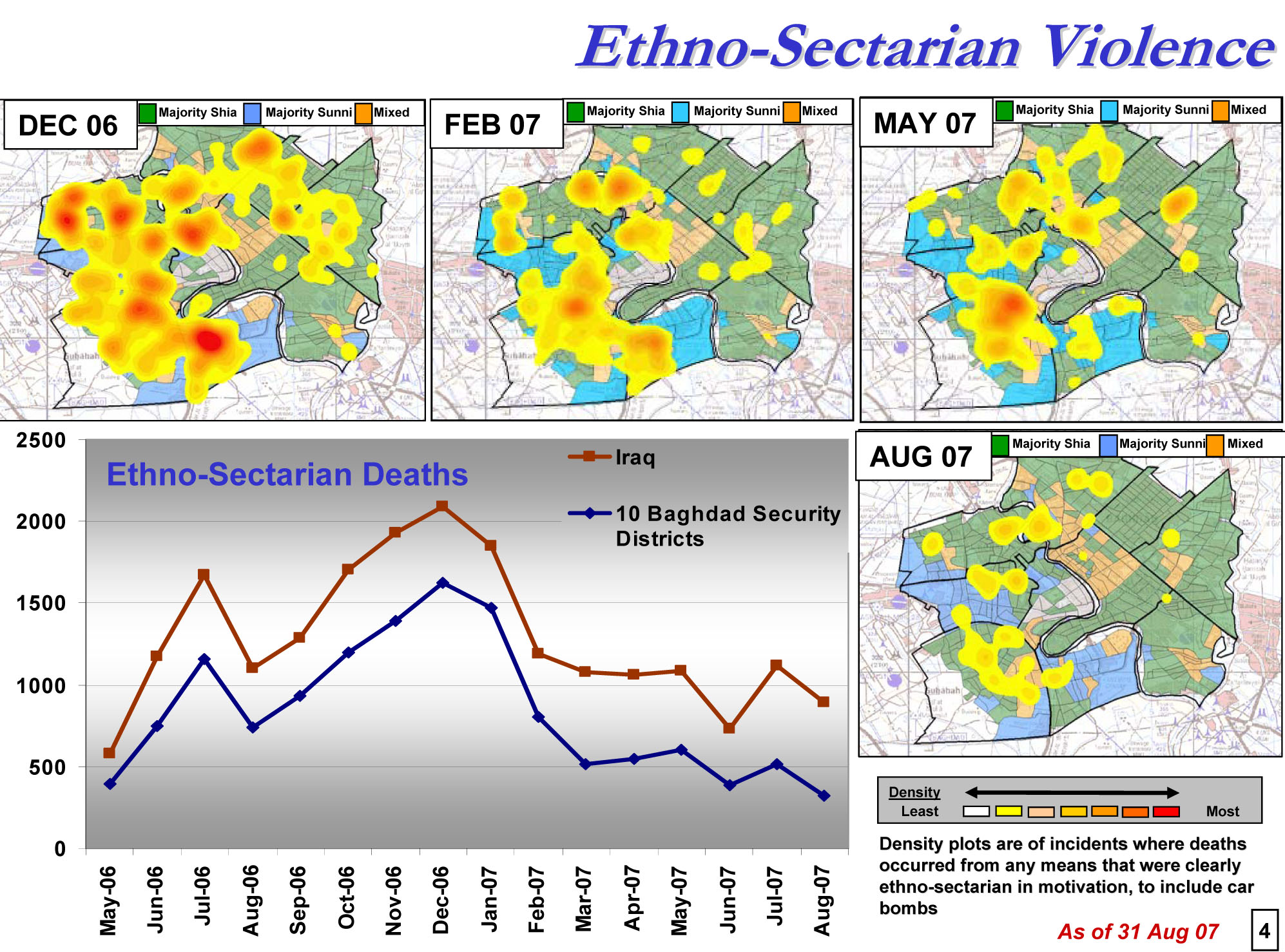
The decline in Baghdad sectarian violence stated in the report, taken from the US Department of Defense website.

The Report to Congress on the Situation in Iraq (sometimes referred to as the Petraeus Report) was a two-part report released on September 10, 2007 by General of the Multinational force in Iraq David H. Petraeus and U.S. Ambassador to Iraq Ryan Crocker on progress by the Iraqi government in the ongoing Iraq War.

== Report testimonies ==
=== Petraeus' testimony ===
Petraeus concluded that "the military objectives of the surge are, in large measure, being met". He cited what he called recent consistent declines in security incidents. He partially attributed those declines to recent blows dealt against Al-Qaeda during the surge. He added that "we have also disrupted Shia militia extremists, capturing the head and numerous other leaders of the Iranian-supported Special Groups, along with a senior Lebanese Hezbollah operative supporting Iran's activities in Iraq." He argued that Coalition and Iraqi operations had drastically reduced ethno-sectarian violence in the country, though he stated that the gains were not entirely even. As such, he recommended a gradual drawdown of U.S. forces in Iraq, with a goal of reaching pre-surge troop levels by July 2008. Troop reductions would continue past this point as the situation warrants. Despite allegations that Petraeus' report would be written by the White House, Petraeus insisted that he had written this testimony himself, without it having "been cleared by, nor shared with, anyone in the Pentagon, the White House, or Congress."

=== Crocker's testimony ===
Though Crocker acknowledged slow political progress in many areas, and a lack of progress on many important pieces of legislation, he argued that, "a secure, stable democratic Iraq at peace with its neighbors is attainable." Though a national framework has fallen short of being implemented legislatively in key issues such as oil distribution, he observed that "even in the absence of legislation there is practical action as the central government shares oil revenues through budget allocations on an equitable basis with Iraq's provinces." He pointed out that provincial gains have been more pronounced, explaining that "there is abundant evidence that the security gains have opened the door for meaningful politics."

== Response ==
=== US Congressional response ===
Several Congressional Democrats strongly criticised the report before it came out. Democratic Representative Rahm Emanuel of Illinois stated that "We don't need a report that wins the Nobel Prize for creative statistics or the Pulitzer for fiction." After Petraeus' testimony, Democratic Senate Majority Leader Harry Reid of Nevada argued the General's "plan is just more of the same" and "is neither a drawdown or a change in mission that we need." He also said that Congressional Democrats plan "to change the course of the war". Democratic Representative Robert Wexler of Florida accused Petraeus of "cherry-picking statistics" and "massaging information". Some members of the House Foreign Affairs and Armed Services Committees regarded the testimony as a publicity stunt; Representative Ike Skelton stated that "Iraqi leaders have made no progress".

Chairman of the House Foreign Affairs Committee Tom Lantos of California called the General and the Ambassador "Two of our nation's most capable public servants" and said Democrats feel "esteem for their professionalism." He also said "We can no longer take their assertions on Iraq at face value"; concluding, "We need to get out of Iraq, for that country's sake as well as our own." Republican Presidential candidate Duncan Hunter called the report "a candid, independent assessment given with integrity". Republican Senator Jon Kyl of Arizona stated that "I commend General Petraeus for his honest and forthright assessment of the situation in Iraq." Anti-war Republican Senator Chuck Hagel of Nebraska criticized the report while praising Petraeus, saying "It's not your fault, general... It's not Ambassador Crocker's fault. It's this administration's fault."

=== US Federal Government response ===
The Bush Administration accepted Petraeus' troop deployment recommendations. It also stated that "Iraq's Government Has Not Yet Met Its Own Legislative Benchmarks" (the original capitalization). Three other government reports measuring progress in Iraq were commissioned prior to Petraeus' testimony. A Government Accountability Office report stated that the Iraqi Government did not meet 11 of the 18 benchmark measures as of August 30, 2007. On September 14, a White House survey reported "satisfactory" progress on 9 of the 18 benchmarks. Lionel Beehner of the nonpartisan Council of Foreign Relations has called the benchmarks "vague because the metrics to measure them are imprecise." The New York Times stated on May 13 that "Nobody in Washington seems to agree on what progress actually means – or how, precisely, it might be measured."

Petraeus has stated that his recommendations are not dependent on the Iraqi government's ability to meet the benchmarks. President Bush held a televised address on September 13 in which he discussed the recommendations. The non-partisan FactCheck.org criticized some of his comments, saying the President had "played loose with the facts".

=== Iraqi Government response ===
On February 16, 2008, Iraqi Defense Minister Abdel Qader Jassim Mohammed told reporters that the surge was "working very well" and that Iraq has a "pressing" need for troops to stay to secure Iraqi borders. He stated that "Results for 2007 prove that -- Baghdad is good now".

=== Third-Party response ===
Anti-war liberal advocacy group MoveOn.org published a full-page ad in The New York Times on September 10, 2007 accusing Petraeus of "cooking the books for the White House". The ad also labeled him "General Betray Us". On September 20, the Senate passed an amendment by Republican John Cornyn of Texas condemning the ad. All 49 Republican Senators and 22 Democratic Senators voted in support. The House passed an amendment criticizing the ad "in the strongest terms" by a 341-79 vote on September 26.

Council of Foreign Relations consulting editor Bernard Gwertzman stated that, during his testimony, Ambassador Crocker "really couldn't hold out the hope of any immediate breakthrough on a reconciliation front. He was, I thought, in State Department-ese as gloomy as you could be." Council President Richard N. Haass stated that "He [Crocker] was not holding out high prospects of reconciliation. He was basically saying that benchmarks hadn't been met and were not likely to be met. This is part and parcel of a larger story." Fellow Charles Kupchan argued that "The central issue is whether the surge shows signs of providing sufficient security in Baghdad and elsewhere to promote political stability, sectarian reconciliation, and functioning state institutions. The answer is unequivocally, "no."" Fellow Stephen Biddle argued that "Monday's testimony yielded a mixed picture".

Thomas Engelhardt wrote in left-liberal journal The Nation that "Numbers in Iraq are a slippery matter at best, though again, why anyone pays serious attention to US military numbers from that country is a mystery. On countless occasions in the past, these have been ridiculous undercounts of disaster." The Washington Post stated on September 25 that "Apparent contradictions are relatively easy to find in the flood of bar charts and trend lines the military produces. Civilian casualty numbers in the Pentagon's latest quarterly report on Iraq last week, for example, differ significantly from those presented by the top commander in Iraq, Gen. David H. Petraeus, in his recent congressional testimony." The story quoted a Multi-National Force-Iraq spokesperson saying that "There is a current effort to consolidate multiple databases in theater".

Three other reports on the current situation in Iraq—a General Accounting Office study, a National Intelligence Estimate, and an independent commission assessment by retired general James L. Jones—were published for Congress around the same time as Petraeus' report. USA Today compared the four reports' findings. The New York Times also did so.

In December 2007, The Washington Post's "Fact Checker" stated that "While some of Petraeus's statistics are open to challenge, his claims about a general reduction in violence have been borne out over subsequent months. It now looks as if Petraeus was broadly right on this issue at least". Michael E. O'Hanlon and Jason H. Campbell of the non-partisan Brookings Institution stated in January 2008 that Iraq's security environment had reached its best levels since early 2004 and credited Petraeus' strategy for the improvement. They considered Iraq's economy and political system to be "only marginally better than a year ago". O'Hanlon stated that month that "Overall, Iraq's political system probably merits a grade of roughly C for its performance over the last 12 months." He also stated that "the pace of progress is finally picking up." U.S. News & World Report stated that Iraq has experienced a "dramatic drop in violence and other signs of progress in recent months" and also stated that the "political divisions in Iraq remain deep, and if they are not bridged soon, civil war could well erupt again."

=== Public opinion ===
==== United States public opinion ====
The Wall Street Journal has stated the report decreased public discontent with the war in Iraq, but the changes were "modest". USA Today has stated, in contrast, that "attitudes toward the war have solidified". A Fox News poll taken from September 11 to 12 reported that 49% of Americans believe "the recent increase in U.S. troops has led to major improvements in the situation in Iraq, [or] minor improvements" while 48% disagree and 3% felt unsure. It also found that 35% considered Petraeus's report "truthful and objective", 40% considered it "slanted", and 25% felt unsure. The poll had a 3% margin of error.

An early September CNN poll found that 53% did not believe the General's report would be "independent and objective"; an August USA Today poll stated the same thing. A mid-September Pew Research Center survey found that, of everyone who has heard of his report, 57% support his recommendations. The survey also stated that 32% of Americans have not heard of the report and that, overall, the President's address and Petraeus' report did not change minds about the surge. Another Pew Research Center survey found that 18% of Americans want to remove all troops immediately, 18% support a gradual withdrawal over the next two years, 39% support keeping troops in, and 7% feel unsure. A late-September ABC News poll asked about Petraeus' recommendations without mentioning him by name. The poll reported that 43% of Americans think the number of troops should be reduced "more quickly", 12% "more slowly", and 38% agree with the recommendations.

An early February 2008 Gallup Poll found that 60% of Americans believe the decision to invade Iraq was a mistake. The poll also found that 43% think that the troop increase is "making the situation there better".

==== Iraqi public opinion ====
The New York Times has stated that Iraqis viewed the report ambivalently, but that most believed it accurately portrayed the situation on the ground. A BBC News poll published the day of Petraeus' testimony reported that 70% of Iraqis believe that the surge has worsened conditions in the country. It also reported that over 90% of Iraqi Sunnis consider attacks on American forces acceptable while 50% of Iraqi Shia do. Another BBC poll found that only 35% of Iraqis supported an immediate withdrawal of coalition troops. The remainder thought the forces should stay until it met its goals regarding the security situation or its goals in strengthening the Government of Iraq.

== See also ==
- Iraq War troop surge of 2007
- MoveOn.org ad controversy
- Multinational force in Iraq
- Iraq insurgency
