= Mohammed Awad (politician) =

Iraqi politician

Mohammed Hussain Awad Al-Juboori (Arabic: محمد حسين عوض الجبوري) was a political party member of the Iraqi National Dialogue Council that is a moderate Sunni block. He was a representative of this block at the National Assembly of Iraq. On 12 April 2007, he was killed in the Green Zone at the convention center canteen of the parliament building in Baghdad, Iraq, in the 2007 Iraqi Parliament Bombing.
