= Khalid Hassan =

Iraqi journalist

Khalid W. Hassan (Arabic: خالد حسان) (died July 13, 2007) was an interpreter and reporter in the Baghdad bureau of The New York Times. Hassan was shot and killed on the way to work in the Saidiya district of south central Baghdad. He had called the bureau earlier and said his normal route to the office had been blocked by a security checkpoint and was trying to find another way into the office.

Half an hour later Hassan called his mother (with whom he lived), telling her he had been shot. Hassan's family later confirmed he had been killed.

Hassan was of Palestinian descent; his family leaving for Iraq after the 1948 Arab-Israeli War. Hassan lived with his mother and four sisters, all of whom are under the age of 18.
