= List of members of the Council of Representatives of Iraq, 2005–2010 =

The members of the first Iraqi Council of Representatives were elected in December 2005 under the newly adopted constitution.

The main functions of the council were to:

- Elect the first permanent government of Iraq since the invasion and occupation of Iraq by United States and allied forces in 2003
- Discuss amendments to the constitution
- Implement various element of the constitution including nominating members of the judiciary, resolving the status of Kirkuk and establishing Regions.

Votes chose between coalition lists, and seats were allocated according to a formula that considered first the proportion of votes received in each governorate and then allocated compensatory national seats to those lists where the governorate seats did not reflect their share of the national vote. Individual members were then nominated by the lists.

Where members of the Council of Representative are appointed to the Council of Ministers or the Presidency Council they have to resign their seat and the coalition list must appoint a replacement member. The same is the case if a member dies, resigns, is disqualified or incapacitated or is deemed to have "committed a crime against the constitution"

== United Iraqi Alliance - 128 seats ==
=== Supreme Islamic Iraqi Council ===
SIIC was previously known as the Supreme Council for the Islamic Revolution in Iraq or SCIRI

1. Abd al-Aziz Muhsin Mahdi al-Hakim Leader of the United Iraqi Alliance
2. Ijra' Faysal Udah
3. Basimah Aziz Nasir
4. Jinan Jasim al-Ubaydi
5. AbdulAmeer AbdAzahra
6. Hamid Rashid Ma`ala
7. Rida Jawad Taqi
8. Abdul Jabar Raheef
9. Salim Jasur Hasun
10. Layla Thamir Fakhir
11. Majeed Khayr Allah Rahi
12. Fathiyah Abd al-Halim Abd al-Karim
13. Muhammad Taqi Ali al-Mawla (an ethnic Iraqi Turkmen)
14. Jalal al-Din Ali al-Saghir (Badr Organization)
15. Iqball Khalil Ghani (Badr Organization)
16. Iman Khalil Sha`alan (Badr Organization)
17. Tahsin `Abd Matar (Badr Organization)
18. Ra'idah Freini Bawi (Badr Organization)
19. Diya' al-Din Muhammad al-Fayyad (Badr Organization)
20. Abd al-Karim Abd al-Sahib (Badr Organization)
21. Muhammad Rajih Alwan (Badr Organization)
22. Muhammad Husayn Salih (Badr Organization)
23. Muhammad Naji Muhammad Ali (Badr Organization)
24. Muhammad Mahdi Ameen (Badr Organization)
25. Muna Nur Zalzalah (Badr Organization)
26. Nidal Ta`an Abbas (Badr Organization)
27. Hadi Farhan al-Amiri (Badr Organization)
28. Hadi Abd Allah Bash (Badr Organization)
29. Hammam Baqir Abd al-Hamid Hammudi (Badr Organization)

=== Sadrist Movement ===
Note: the Sadrist Movement boycotted the Council of Representatives from 13 June to 17 July 2007 in protest of the 2007 al-Askari Mosque bombing

Note that the Sadrist Movement quit the United Iraq Alliance in September 2007

1. Ahmad Hasan Ali
2. Adibah Musa Shahd
3. Amirah Jasim Khalaf
4. Intisar Jasim Muhammad Rida
5. Iman Jalal Muhammad
6. Balqis Kuli Muhammad
7. Baha' al-A`raji
8. Tahsin Hameed Khulayf
9. Hasan Tu`mah al-Rubay`i
10. Haneen Mahmoud Al Qudw
11. Husayn Amir Radi
12. Haydar Sa`id Isma`il
13. Zaynab Karim al-Juburi
14. Salam Udah al-Maliki
15. Salih Hasan Isa
16. Adil Salih Majid
17. Aliyah Hamzah Duwayj
18. Aqil Abd Husayn Sajit
19. Allawi Madlul Hamzah
20. Alwan Habib Husayn
21. Ghufran Abbud Husayn
22. Fawzi Akram Samin
23. Falah Hasan Shanshal
24. Qusay Abd al-Wahhab Abbud al-Suhayl
25. Liqa' Ja`far Muntazir
26. Majidah Husayn Dashar
27. Maha Adil al-Duri
28. Nasir Hashim Tha`lab
29. Nassar Saghir Darbi

=== Islamic Virtue Party ===
Note that the Islamic Virtue Party left the United Iraqi Alliance in March 2007. They had previously quit the government of Nouri al-Maliki in March 2006 - see Government of Iraq from 2006 for more information.

1. Basim Jasim Nur
2. Basim Sharif Nasid
3. Bushra Jabbar Badan
4. Jabir Khalifah Jabir
5. Hasan Halbus al-Shammari
6. Karim Muhsin Hasan
7. Zahra' Abbas al-Hashimi
8. Siham Kazim Salman
9. Sabah Julub Falih
10. Ammar Tu`mah Abd al-Abbas
11. Kamilah Kazim Muhammad
12. Muhammad Kazim Khalif
13. Muhammad Isma`il Hasan
14. Mukhlis Balasim Sa`dun
15. Nadim Isa al-Jabiri

=== Islamic Dawa Party ===
1. Ali Muhammad Salih al-Adib
2. Haidar al-Abbadi
3. Jinan Abd al-Jabbar Yasin
4. Hasan Hameed Hasan
5. Ibrahim Abd al-Karim al-Ja`fari (split in 2007 to the National Reform Trend)
6. Jabir Abd al-Kazim Salman
7. Shahid Husayn Matar
8. Falah Faysal al-Fayyad (split in 2007 to the National Reform Trend)
9. Kamal Khalawi Abd Allah
10. Najihah Abd al-Amir Abd al-Karim
11. Nada Abd Allah al-Sudani

=== Islamic Dawa Party - Iraq Organisation ===
1. Kasim Muhammad Taqi al-Sahlani
2. Iman Hamid Ali
3. Khalid Ubayd Jazi`
4. Sahar jaber Ata
5. Khawla Abdul Sadeq
6. Suad Hameed Lafteh
7. Abd al-Hadi Muhammad al-Hasani
8. Abd Ali Laftah Ni`mah
9. Adilah Hammud Husayn
10. Ali Hussain al-Alaq
11. Qasim `Atiyah al-Juburi
12. Muna Husayn Abd Ali
13. Na`imah Salman Abbas
14. Abd al-Karim Ali al-Anazi

=== Independents ===
1. Ahmad Jasim Muhammad al-Zubaydi
2. Inaam Ali Al Jawadi
3. Jabir Habib Jabir
4. Amer Thamer Ali
5. Haydar Karim Fahd al-Suwaydi
6. Haydar Sabkhi al-Jurani
7. Khalid Abadhir al-Atiyah
8. Zakiyah Isma`il Haqi
9. Sami Jasim al-Askari
10. Samirah Ja`far al-Musawi
11. Shatha Mousa Sadiq
12. Taha Der'e Taha
13. Abidah Ahmad Dakhil al-Ta'i
14. Amirah Muhammad al-Baldawi
15. Abbas Hasan al-Bayati (an ethnic Iraqi Turkmen)
16. Abd al-Wahhab Abd al-Hakim al-Safi
17. Qassim Daoud
18. Qays Sa`d al-Amiri
19. Lamiya' Na`imah Dawud
20. Muhammad Muhammad Salih al-Haydari
21. Muhammad Izz al-Din al-Khatib
22. Mazhar Husayn al-Hakim
23. Malhan Imran al-Mkoter
24. Hashim Rida Ali
25. Hana' Turki Abd al-Ta'i
26. Hayfa' Majli Ja`far

=== Others ===
1. Jamal Ja`far Muhammad Ali
2. Daghir Jasim Kazim
3. Feriad Omar Abdullah
1. Layla Kadhem Jasim ??

== Kurdistani Alliance - 53 seats ==
1. Ablahad Afraim Sawa - Chaldean Democratic Union
2. Ahlam Asa'ad Mohamed
3. Ahmad Yousef Mousa
4. Ahmad Anwar Mohamed
5. Ismail Shaker Rasool
6. Akram Qader Mohamed
7. Alla Tahseen Habeeb - Patriotic Union of Kurdistan
8. Azad Omar Hasan
9. Asia Ahmad Khalid
10. Azad Rafeeq Tawfeeq
11. Baized Hasan Abd Alla
12. Bukhari Abd Alla Khadar
13. Barham Salih - Patriotic Union of Kurdistan
14. Tania Tala'at Mohamed
15. Jalal Talabani - Patriotic Union of Kurdistan
16. Hasan Othman Mohamed
17. Khalid Salam Saeed (an ethnic Yazidi)
18. Darkhshan Mohamed afandi
19. Rabha Hamad Abd Alla
20. Rawoof Othman Ma'aroof
21. Rooz Nouri Sedeq
22. Zaian Anwar Rasheed
23. Samia Azeez Mohamed
24. Sa'adi Ismail Abd Al Kareem
25. Suzan Mohamed Mohamed Ameen
26. Serwan Adnan Merza
27. Aref Tayfour - Kurdistan Democratic Party of Iraq
28. Ass Husain Mohamed
29. Abd Al Khaleq Mohamed Rasheed
30. Abd Al Rahman Ali Mohamed
31. Abd Alla Saleh Hafth Alla
32. Abd Alla Mohamed Ali
33. Abd Al Bari Mohamed Fares
34. Ali Hisain Balo
35. Farzandah Ahmad Qsaim
36. Feriad Mohamed Taqi Hasan
37. Fawzi Franso Hariri - Kurdistan Democratic Party of Iraq
38. Faian Sedeq Mustafa
39. Kamilia Ibrahim Ahmad
40. Kian Kamel Hasan
41. Lateef Haji Hasan
42. Laila Mohamed Qahraman
43. Laila Ali Karam
44. Muhsen Sa'adoon Ahmad
45. Mohamed Shareef Ahmad
46. Mohamed Reda Mohamed Mahmoud
47. Mohamed Fouad Maasoum Khader
48. Mahmoud Othman - Kurdish Socialist Party
49. Nazneen Husain Faed Alla
50. Nozad Saleh Rifaat - Patriotic Union of Kurdistan
51. Hoshyar Zebari - Kurdistan Democratic Party of Iraq
52. Walid Mohamed Mohamed Saleh Sharika - Iraqi Turkomen Brotherhood Party
53. Yousef Ahmad Mustafa

== Iraqi Accord Front - 44 seats ==
(Note: The Front boycotted the Council of Representatives from 2007-06-24 in protest at the suspension of the speaker, Mahmoud al-Mashhadani and the arrest warrant against Culture Minister As'ad al-Hashimi. They ended their boycott 19 July after Mashhadani was reinstated.)

Note: Six members of the IAF have defected since their election

1. Ibrahim Ne'ema Thanoon
2. Ahmad Sulaiman Jameel
3. Ahmad Rakan Abd Al Azeez
4. Azhar Abd Al Majeed Husain
5. Usama Tawfeeq Mekhlef
6. Asma Adnan Mohamed
7. Asma Abd Alla Saleh
8. Alaa al-Sadoun
9. Amal Seham Hamed
10. Amnah Ghadban Mobarak
11. Iyad Saleh Mahdi
12. Taiseer Najeh Awad
13. Jamal Mohsen Mousa
14. Hareth Mohei Al Deen Abed
15. Hasan Deikan Khdeir
16. Husain Shokor Hameed al-Falluji - resigned from the Front in July 2008
17. Khalaf al-Ulayyan
18. Khalaf Mohamed Abed Al Mawla
19. Khalil Jdou'o Attia
20. Rafe'e Hiad Jiad
21. Raja Hamdoun Abd Alla
22. Salman Ali Hasan
23. Saleem Abd Alla Ahmad al-Jabouri
24. Shatha Munther Abd Al Razeq
25. Tariq al-Hashimi
26. Taha Khdeir Ftheil
27. Thafer Nathem Salman
28. Amer Habeeb Khaizaran
29. Abd Motlaq Hmoud
30. Abd Al Naser Kareem Yousef al-Janabi - resigned October 2007 and replaced by Ahmed Radhi
31. Abd Al Kareem Ali Yseen
32. `Adnan al-Dulaymi
33. Adnan Thiab Ghanem
34. Ezz Al Deen Abd Alla Husain al-Dawla He resigned from the Front in July 2008
35. Alla Maki Abd Al Razeq
36. Omar Abd Al Sattar Mahmoud
37. Mahmoud al-Mashhadani
38. Methher Sa'adoon Awad
39. Naderah Aef Habeeb
40. Naef Jasem Mohamed
41. Nawal Majeed Hameed
42. Nour Al Deen Saeed Mousa
43. Hashem Yahia Ahmad
44. Wethab Shaker Mahmoud

== Iraqi National List - 25 seats ==
1. Usama Abd Al Azeez Al Najafi
2. Iyad Allawi - Iraqi National Accord
3. Iyad Raouf Mohamed Jalal Al Deen
4. Jamal Abd Al Hadi Batekh
5. Hajem Mahdi Saleh al-Hassani (independent since Sep 2007)
6. Husam Abd Al Kareem Abed Ali
7. Husain Ali Al Sha'alan (d. July 2007)
8. Hamid Majid Mousa - Iraqi Communist Party
9. Kheir Alla Kareem Kathem
10. Radwan Husain Abbas Al Kleidar
11. Sa'ad Sfouk Al Masoudi
12. Safia Taleb Ali al-Suhail (independent since Sep 2007)
13. Aida Shareef Tawfeeq (died June 27, 2007?)
14. Alia Naseef Jasem
15. Abd Al Lateef Abd Al Wahab Husain
16. Adnan Pachachi - Assembly of Independent Democrats
17. Ezzat Hasan Ali
18. Ghazi al-Yawar - The Iraqis
19. Falah Hassan al-Naqib
20. Mohamed Tawfeeq Husain
21. Mohamed Abbas Mohamed
22. Mofeed Mohaed Jawad - Iraqi Communist Party
23. Mahdi Ahmad Al Hafeth - Iraqi Independent Democrats (since May 2007 an independent)
24. Maysun al-Damluji
25. Wael Abdul Latif

== Iraqi National Dialogue Front - 11 seats ==
(Note: The Dialogue Front boycotted the Council of Representatives from 24 June to 19 July 2007 in protest at the suspension of the speaker, Mahmoud al-Mashhadani and the arrest warrant against Culture Minister As'ad al-Hashimi)

1. Asa'ad Ibrahim Husain
2. Saleh al-Mutlaq
3. Ali Abd Alla Hmoud
4. Omar Khalaf Jawad
5. Falah Hasan Zeidan
6. Mohamed Ktouf Mansour
7. Mohammed Hassan Awad (died April 12, 2007 )
8. Mohamed Ali Mohamed
9. Mahmoud Thanoun Mahmoud
10. Mustafa Mohamed Ameen Mohamed Ali
11. Nada Mohamed Ibrahim

== Kurdistan Islamic Union - 5 seats ==
1. Asmar Husain Ahmad
2. Zuhair Muhamed Ameed Rasheed
3. Sami Abd Alla Husain
4. Omar Ali Husain
5. Mohamed Ahmad Mahmoud

== Reconciliation and Liberation Bloc - 3 seats ==
1. Abd Alla Iskandar Habeeb
2. Mohamed Al Jbouri Khlaf Hasan
3. Mesha'an Rkath Damen

== The Upholders of the Message - 2 seats ==
1. Hasan Hashem Metsher
2. Naseer Kathem Obaid

== Iraqi Turkmen Front - 1 seat ==
1. Saadeddin Arkej

== National Rafidain List - 1 seat ==
1. Yonadam Kanna - Assyrian Democratic Movement

== Mithal al-Alusi List - 1 seat ==
1. Mithal al-Alusi

== Yazidi Movement for Reform and Progress - 1 seat ==
1. Ameen Farhan Jejo
