= Amendments to the Constitution of Iraq =

The government of Iraq has established a committee to consider a proposed amendment to the Constitution of Iraq.

== Current constitution ==
The current Constitution of Iraq was drafted by a committee of the Iraqi Transitional Government. The agreed text was put to a referendum in October 2005. It was approved by 79% of voters and 15 out of 18 governorates.

== Agreement to consider amendments ==
In an agreement prior to the referendum, the largest Sunni Arab majority party, the Iraqi Islamic Party agreed to support a "Yes" vote as long as the first parliament elected under the constitution agreed to consider amendments. This agreement was written into Article 142 of the constitution.

== Procedure ==
Article 142 of the constitution states that the Council of Representatives shall form a committee from its members "representing the principal components of the Iraqi society", which should present proposed amendments to the Council within four months. The amendment package shall be voted on as a whole by the council, and if it is passed, put to a referendum, which shall pass if approved by a majority of voters and is not rejected by a two-thirds majority in three or more governorates. The conditions for this referendum are the same as the conditions for the original ratification referendum.

The constitution can also be amended by a general procedure, laid down in Article 126, which requires a two-thirds approval in the Council of Ministers, followed by approval by a simple majority in a referendum.

== Committee appointment ==
The committee of 27 was appointed on 2006-09-25, chaired by Iraqi Accord Front member Ayad al-Samarrai. The committee comprised 27 members drawn from senior politicians across the political spectrum in rough proportions to the Council of Representatives of Iraq that was elected in the Iraqi legislative election of December 2005:

- United Iraqi Alliance (Shiite): 12
  - SCIRI and allies:
    - Shaykh Hummam Hamudi
    - Shaykh Jalal al-Din al-Saghir
    - Abd al-Karim al-Naqib (Badr Organization)
    - Abbas al-Bayati (Islamic Union of Iraqi Turkoman)
  - Islamic Dawa Party - Iraq Organisation
    - Ali al-Allaq
    - Abd al-Karim al-'Anzi
  - Islamic Dawa Party
    - Sami al-'Askari
  - Islamic Virtue Party
    - Ammar Tuma
    - Hassan al-Shammari
  - independent
    - Qasim Dawud
  - unknown
    - Najiha Abd al-Amir
    - Jabir Habib Jabir
- Kurdistani Alliance (Kurdish): 5
  - Fu'ad Ma'sum
  - Sa'd al-Barzanji
  - Feryad Rawandazi
  - Abdallah Salih
  - Ahmad Anwar Muhammad
- Iraqi Accord Front (Sunni Arab): 4
  - Iyad al-Samarra'i
  - Hussein al-Falluji
  - Salim al-Jabburi
  - Izz al-Din al-Dawlah
- Iraqi National List (secular): 2
  - Aliya Nassif Osairan
  - Hamid Majid Musa
- Iraqi National Dialogue Front: 1
  - Muhammad Ali Tamim

In addition, the representatives of the Turkmen, Mandaeans, and Yazidis were invited to nominate a member each to join the committee

The Iraqi National Dialogue Front has rejected the deal that led to the formation of the committee and has refused to participate.

== Amendments proposed ==
Seven areas have been identified as areas where one or more of the political forces in Iraq would like to change:

1. The ability of constitutional changes to be vetoed by three out of the 19 governorates
2. Iraq's Arab identity
3. The shape of the federal system
4. The status of Kirkuk
5. The split of oil revenues between national and regional governments
6. The role of Islam
7. De-Baathification

== Positions ==
The main proposed amendments have come from the Sunni Arab majority parties who want to make it more difficult to establish an oil-rich Shiite "super-region" in the south of Iraq

However, SCIRI has insisted that the "essence" of the constitution should be maintained and has pushed for the creation of a Shiite Region covering the nine southern governorates. On March 16 Abdul Aziz al-Hakim, the leader of SCIRI proposed a compromise whereby two Regions are created - one in the far South near Basra and one for the middle Euphrates region. The Islamic Virtue Party governor of Basra has expressed support for a Region covering Basrah and its only its two neighbouring governorates of Maysan and Dhiqar. The Sadrist Movement supports a stronger central government, saying that federalism should not be applied to the south "while Iraq is still under occupation".

The National Dialogue Front has asked that the de-Baathification provisions be reworded to "be fair to those that have suffered under this article".

Some Shiite leaders had proposed changing the country's official name to the Islamic Republic of Iraq, a move opposed by Iraq's secularists.

=== Iraq Study Group ===
The Iraq Study Group of senior American politicians recommended that the constitution be amended as follows:

- Oil revenue should accrue wholly to the central government and not split with the regions
- The referendum on Kirkuk joining the Iraqi Kurdistan region should be delayed

=== Kurdistani Alliance ===
The Kurdistani Alliance submitted a working paper in April 2007 with the following proposed changes:

- Iraq to be renamed the "Federal Republic of Iraq"
- Iraqi Kurdistan to have its own representative at the United Nations

=== Iraqi Accord Front ===
The Iraqi Accord Front was reported in July 2007 as seeking the following changes:

- Whilst now accepting the establishment of new Regions of Iraq, it wants the powers of these to be limited
- Deleting references to the religious Hawza of Najaf
- Remove the de-Baathification clauses
- Bringing existing as well as future crude oil fields into the law on oil
- Postponing the Kirkuk status referendum
