= Abd al-Nasir al-Janabi =

Iraqi politician

Abdul Nasir Karim Yusuf al-Janabi is an Iraqi politician and a former member of the Iraqi Council of Representatives for the Sunni Arab-led Iraqi Accord Front.

A Salafist, he was appointed in 2005 to the committee which drafted the constitution of Iraq. Following the drafting, he called for the Arab League and United Nations to intervene to prevent it being passed into law.

He was elected in the Iraqi legislative election of December 2005 as one of the Front's 44 MPs, from the Iraqi National Dialogue Council party.

In October 2006 a woman was killed when mortar rounds hit his house in Mussayab, Babil Governorate.

In March 2007 the Iraqi Supreme Judicial Council requested that the Council of Representatives lift his parliamentary immunity to face charges of kidnappings and terrorism. This followed an exchange in Parliament the previous month with Prime Minister Nouri al-Maliki, who said he was involved in the kidnapping and murder of 150 Shiites near Hilla in Anbar province.

In July 2007 Janabi announced he was resigning from the Front and parliament and "joining the armed resistance". The Front and INDC responded by saying that they had expelling him, describing him as a "troublemaker".
