= Asma al-Dulaimi =

Iraqi politician

Asmaa Adnan Mohamed Salman al-Dulaimi is an Iraqi politician and a member of parliament for the Iraqi Accord Front.

Asmaa al-Dulami taught Islamic Studies at a university in Baghdad before entering politics. She was elected to the Council of Representatives of Iraq in the Iraqi legislative election of December 2005, when the Iraqi Accord Front, a coalition of three parties including her own - the General Council for the People of Iraq, a party led by her father, Adnan al-Dulaimi - won 44 seats.
