= Basma (name) =

Besma and its variants Basmah, Basma, Basima, Bassima, Basimah, and Basemah are Arabic words which are used as a feminine given name and a surname. Its adjective form means "smile" in Arabic. People with the name include:

== Given name ==
- Bassima (born 1973), Lebanese singer
- Basma Abdel Aziz (born 1976), Egyptian psychiatrist and human rights activist
- Basima Abdulrahman, Kurdish-Iraqi engineer
- Basimah Aziz Nasir, Iraqi politician
- Bassima Hakkaoui (born 1960), Moroccan politician
- Basma Khalfaoui (born 1970), Tunisian lawyer and political activist
- Basmah bint Saud Al Saud (born 1964), Saudi royal
- Basemah al-Shater (1959–2023), Syrian Major General
- Basma bint Talal (born 1951), Jordanian royal
- Basimah Yusuf Butrus (born 1963), Iraqi Assyrian politician

== Surname ==
- Christer Basma (born 1972), Norwegian football player
- Kassim Basma (born 1960), Sierra Leonean businessman
- Muhsen Basma (born 1966), Syrian football referee
