= Naif Mohammed Jasim =

Iraqi politician

Naif Mohammed Jasim is an Iraqi politician and a member of the Iraqi Council of Representatives for the Sunni Arab-led Iraqi Accord Front.

He was elected in the Iraqi legislative election of December 2005 as one of the Front's 44 MPs.

In October 2007, he was arrested by United States soldiers who alleged he was at an al-Qaeda meeting in Sharqat, Salahuddin province. Jasim claimed he was attending a funeral there.
