= Khaled al-Attiyah =

Iraqi politician

Shaykh Khaled Abather al-Attiyah (also transliterated as Attia) is an Iraqi politician who was elected in December 2005 to the Council of Representatives as an independent member of the United Iraqi Alliance.

On 22 April 2006 he was elected First Deputy Speaker of the Iraqi National Assembly.

He was born in 1949 in the Shamiyah District and graduated from Law College in Najaf in 1970. He went on to Cairo University where he obtained a Diploma in Shari'a in 1980 and a master's degree in Literature in 1985.

He was worked at the Al-Dar al-Islami Foundation in Iran until 1994 when he moved to Lebanon to head the Al-Ghadir Center for Islamic Studies in Beirut. He also edited the publication Al-Manahij in Beirut from 1995. In 2000 he moved to England where he was the Dean of the Islamic Studies Department at Oxford University and editor of Al-Balagh. In 2003 he returned to Iraq.

== Sources ==
- Profile at Niqash.org
