= Iraqi Council =

Iraqi Council may refer to:

- Council of Representatives of Iraq, the unicameral legislature of Iraq
- Iraqi Governing Council, the provisional government of Iraq from July 13, 2003, to June 1, 2004
- Iraqi National Dialogue Council, a Sunni Islamist political party initially established as an umbrella organization of approximately ten smaller Sunni parties to take part in the 2005 Iraqi Constitution drafting process
- Revolutionary Command Council (Iraq), the ultimate decision-making body in Iraq before the 2003 Invasion of Iraq
