= Basra Region =

Basra Region Arabic: إقليم البصرة
- Proposed federal region
- Proposed flags of the Basra Region

- Potential location of the Basra Region.
- Country: Iraq
- Capital: Basra
- Religion: Shia Islam
- Demonym(s): Basran

The Basra Region (Arabic: إقليم البصرة) is a proposed federal region of Iraq solely encompassing the Basra Governorate. The proposition is supported by a number of political parties and, since 2025, has gained significant support among Basrans. If successful, it will grant Basra autonomy.

The movement for Basra's autonomy, although older, gained significant popularity towards the end of 2025 after Iraq’s electoral commission (IHEC) officially approved the distribution of signature forms to initiate a referendum، By early 2026, the Basra Provincial Council formally requested the activation of the constitutional process, with 17 out of 24 council members signing a petition to declare Basra an independent region. In May 2026, the council decided to hold a formal voting session to advance these legal procedures. However, as of late 2026, the referendum itself has not yet been held.

== Autonomy ==
The primary incentive for the federalisation of Basra is the resulting autonomy it will be granted, specifically in internal affairs such as services, law-enforcement and economy. It is seen as a solution for long-standing grievances over "economic marginalization," as the Basrans demand greater control over the province's massive oil wealth and the strategic Grand Faw Port to combat chronic infrastructure neglect. The Iraqi constitution grants any governorate (except the capital) the authority to form into a federal region possessing a degree of autonomy. The federalisation must be preceded, however, by the demonstrated affirmation (simple majority vote) of the residents of said governorate via a referendum.

== History ==
In November 2008 Wael Abdul Latif, an Independent Islamist MP backed by tribal Sheikhs, submitted a petition to the Electoral Commission of Iraq signed by 34,800 people calling for a vote on a federal region of Iraq covering only the governorate of Basra. The Sadrist movement opposed the move, saying it was "playing with fire" as did the Islamic Dawa Party of Prime Minister Nouri al-Maliki. The Islamic Supreme Council of Iraq remained neutral, as it supports a nine-province Region covered the whole of southern Iraq. As the petition was signed by more than 2% of the population, the commission published an official request for signatures; if more than 10% of the population had signed it before 15 January 2009, a referendum would have been held within 15 days. In the event, the initiative failed to reach 10% and was struck down by the Electoral Commission. Backers accused the al-Maliki federal government of blocking their media campaign and appealed the decision to the Federal Supreme Court.

In September 2014 a number of locals in Basra participated in a demonstration near the headquarters of the local government in Basra, demanding the transfer of the province to a federal region.

As of early 2015, the majority of the political parties, which objected to the federal plans for Iraq on the pretext that they would lead to division, are now supporting the project. The Shia cleric, Ayatolla Sistani is said to disagree on establishing the Basra Region.

By late 2025, the proposal evolved from a fringe political demand into a mainstream constitutional campaign, with supporters viewing the establishment of a federal region as the only viable mechanism to bypass the central government’s bureaucracy and secure a direct share of the national "petrodollar" revenue.

In early 2026, the Basra Provincial Council formally requested the activation of the constitutional process, with a majority of its members signing a petition to declare Basra an independent region. By May 2026, the council decided to hold a formal voting session to advance these legal procedures. However, as of late 2-26, the referendum itself has not yet been held.
