= Asad al-Hashemi =

Iraqi politician

Asad Kamal Mohammed Abdullah al-Hashemi was an Iraqi politician and Culture Minister in the government of Nouri al-Maliki.

== Background ==
al-Hashemi is a Sunni Arab Iraqi who is a professor of Islamic studies. He is a member of the Iraqi People's Conference, a Sunni Arab-led political party led by Adnan al-Dulaimi, which is part of the Iraqi Accord Front electoral coalition.

al-Hashemi was appointed as Culture Minister in May 2006 as one of six members from the Iraqi Accord Front. His appointment was criticised by artists and intellectuals in Baghdad who said he wasn't qualified for the position. He was originally reported to have declined his appointment, but this was later denied.

In June 2007 a warrant was issued for Hashemi's arrest, accusing him of ordering the attempted assassination of the Sunni Arab Iraqi politician, Mithal al-Alusi, in February 2005. In response the Front suspended its participation in the government. al-Alusi then accused the US Embassy of giving shelter to Hashemi.
