= Alaa al-Sadoun =

Iraqi politician

Alaa Abdullah Hamoud Al Saadoun (Arabic: آلاء عبد الله حمود السعدون, born 1956) is an Iraqi politician, member of the Transitional National Assembly (2004-2005) and the Council of Representatives for the governorate of Baghdad in its first session (2005-2010) for Iraqi Islamic Party inside the Iraqi Accord Front. She served as Chairman of the Finance Committee at that session and member of the Committee of the Drafting of the 2005 Constitution.
