= Federal regions of Iraq =

First-level administrative divisions of Iraq

Federal regions of Iraq الأقاليم الاتحادية العراقية (Arabic)
- Category: Federated region
- Location: Republic of Iraq
- Number: 1 federal region
- Areas: 46,860 km^{2} (18,094 sq mi) (Kurdistan Region)
- Government: Regional government
- Subdivisions: Governorates of Iraq

According to the Constitution of Iraq, the Republic of Iraq is composed of the capital (Baghdad), federal regions, decentralised governorates, as well as local administrations. Article 117 of the constitution recognises Kurdistan Region as a federal region, and as of July 2023, it remains the sole federal region in the country. Some additional federal regions have been proposed since 2005, such as the Basra Region.

== Overview ==
The post-2005 Iraqi federal model of governance as outlined by the constitution includes the notion of decentralization and devolution of power from the federal government to administrative divisions, that is, governorates and regions. Both governorates and regions in Iraq are given the constitutional guarantee to exercise a degree of local self-rule in non-federal matters.

One or more governorates in Iraq may organize into a region based on a request to be voted on in a referendum submitted in one of the following two methods:

- a request by one-third of the council members of each governorate intending to form a region, or
- a request by one-tenth of the voters in each of the governorates intending to form a region.

Iraq’s political system is asymmetric, and the only defining federal and devolutionary characteristic of Iraq is the hitherto semi-autonomy of Kurdistan Region, while the rest of Iraq remains unitary. Recent developments in the internal politics of the country, including a rising trend of centralism and systematic erosion of Kurdistan Region’s already fragile semi-autonomy, have prompted some to cast doubt on the future of federalism and decentralisation in Iraq.

== Authorities ==
Section four of the constitution defines the exclusive powers of the Federal government and section five defines the authorities of the federal regions. It does not explicitly describe the federal regions as possessing "autonomy", however, the authorities of the regions are divided into two kinds:

- shared authorities (mentioned in Article 114), that is, authorities that the regions exercise with the federal government such as formulating public educational policy in the regions; and
- devolved authorities, that is, authorities that are neither of the first kind nor are exclusive federal powers.

For instance, the constitution delegates the authority to exercise "executive, legislative, and judicial powers in accordance with [the] Constitution" to federal regions in those matters outside of the federal government's exclusive jurisdiction. Also, in case of legal dispute, the regions are allowed to either “amend the application of” federal legislation in the region or regional laws will take priority in areas related to devolved or shared authorities respectively, as long as they don't contradict with the constitution.

Federal regions are also allowed to establish and organize the internal security forces for the region such as police, security forces, and guards of the regions. Examples of exclusive federal government authorities are ratifying international treaties and formulating foreign policy.

Interpreting the constitution and settling disputes between the federal government, governorates and regions and matters related to constitutionality of all laws are settled by the Federal Supreme Court. Since February 2024, the Federal Supreme Court has expanded its authorities to include the power to amend laws passed by the legislative bodies of federal regions, such as those passed by the Kurdistan Region Parliament.

== Issues ==
=== Federation Council ===
The constitution stipulates in article 65, that

a legislative council shall be established named the "Federation Council," to include representatives from the regions and the governorates that are not organized in a region. A law, enacted by a two-thirds majority of the members of the Council of Representatives, shall regulate the formation of the Federation Council, its membership conditions, its competencies, and all that is connected with it.

This would theoretically serve as the upper house of a bicameral legislature, and facilitate the passing of laws that pertain to issues related to regional and provincial authorities and governance. As of December 2024, the Federation Council has yet to convene. Due to this, the constitutional guarantee of decentralization has not been fully realized.

=== Dismantling Kurdistan Region ===
Since the failed attempt of the only federal region of the country to secede in 2017, it has witnessed a gradual erosion of its authorities. The future relevance of the Iraqi federal model has been questioned as a resurgence of centralism is evident.

In February 2022, the Federal Supreme Court of Iraq issued a verdict revoking the regional oil and gas law passed by the Kurdistan Region Parliament on grounds of it being unconstitutional. This officially took effect after Iraq won an international arbitration case at the International Chamber of Commerce in March 2023.

Following that, the federal government halted all oil exports from the north of the country, dealing a massive blow to the federal region's economy. In September 2023, (according to a report published by Al-Monitor) the Prime Minister of the Kurdistan Region, Masrour Barzani sent a private letter to then President of the United States, Joe Biden urging him to intervene, stating:

"I write to you now at another critical juncture in our history, one that I fear we may have difficulty overcoming. …[W]e are bleeding economically and hemorrhaging politically. For the first time in my tenure as prime minister, I hold grave concerns that this dishonorable campaign against us may cause the collapse of … the very model of a Federal Iraq that the United States sponsored in 2003 and purported to stand by since."

In February 2024, the Federal Supreme Court issued two verdicts; In one verdict, it ordered the KRG to hand over all of its revenues to the federal government as a precondition to it receiving its annual share of the federal budget. In another verdict, it revoked and amended Kurdistan Region's Election Law, setting a legal precedent for the latter.

By amending its legislation the Court effectively superseded the Kurdistan Region Parliament. In January 2024, Kurdistan Region PM Barzani said:

“The attacks targeting the Kurdistan Region are deliberate attempts by our enemies, opponents, and traitors to dismantle its structure. Their objective is to weaken the Kurdistan Region through sustained aggression and pressure, with the hope that it will eventually collapse.”

The undoing of Kurdistan Region's authorities is indicative of the shift in the political model of governance in Iraq towards pre-1991 unitarianism and a sign that the federal government is reasserting control.

=== Unimplemented Article 140 ===
Article 140, Second, of the Constitution of Iraq states: “The responsibility placed upon the executive branch of the Iraqi Transitional Government stipulated in Article 58 of the Transitional Administrative Law shall extend and continue to the executive authority elected in accordance with this Constitution, provided that it accomplishes completely (normalization and census and concludes with a referendum in Kirkuk and other disputed territories to determine the will of their citizens), by a date not to exceed the 31st of December 2007.”

The Transitional Administrative Law Article 58 in question stipulates that areas that were previously affected by Ba'athist policies of demographic change as well as territorial changes such as redefining borders of governorates, have to be “normalised” demographically as well as administratively by restoring them to their initial ethnic composition as well as provincial boundaries. Those that were forcibly relocated or otherwise disenfranchised by the previous regime have to be resettled to their original estates or provided compensation. With regards to those “newly introduced” settlers that were brought there by the previous Baathi regime, they also have to be compensated and relocated. Finally, a census would be conducted to determine the official ethnic composition of the territories, as well as a referendum that would determine the status of the disputed territories; that is, whether or not they would become part of the Kurdistan Region.

As of November 2024, not a single practical step has been taken to implement the provisions of the article, in fact, Kurdish authorities have alleged that the Iraqi government has resumed the Arabization of disputed territories.

== Proposed federal regions ==
While Iraq was still under occupation, in May 2007, Joe Biden, then a member of the United States Senate, proposed dividing Iraq into three regions based on ethnic and sectarian identities (Shia, Sunni and Kurdish). It was thought of as a solution for governance intended to shield the country from sectarian tensions, allowing its main components to each exercise a degree of local self-rule in their own respective areas, and in this way solving the main problem perceived to be the catalyst of conflict in the country.

=== Assyria (al-Rafidain) Region ===
Flag of Assyrians

On 5 March 2017, a joint statement issued by Assyrian, Yazidi and Turkmen representatives called for a semi-autonomous federal region in Northern Iraq to be established.

=== Shia Region ===
In August 2005, prior to the official adoption of the new constitution of Iraq, Abdul Aziz al-Hakim, the leader of the SCIRI party, proposed the establishment of a separate federal region in southern Iraq, encompassing all those governorates in Iraq that have a Shia-majority population. The idea, however, was not universally accepted within the Shia community of Iraq. The spokesperson for the then-Prime Minister Ibrahim al-Jafari from the Dawa Party, rejected the call, calling it a “bad idea”. It was strongly denounced by Sunnis, mainly due to the inclusion of the oil-rich Basra Governorate. Its oil revenues —they surmised— would then be exclusively the right of the Shias of the proposed region.

=== Sunni Region ===
Flag sometimes used by Iraqi Sunni Arabs

The Sunni Region is a proposed federal region that would encompass all Arab Sunni-majority governorates of the country. The purpose of which is to allow the Sunni Arab population of Iraq to exercise a degree of local self-rule.

=== Diyala Region ===
On 12 December 2011, the Diyala Provincial Council voted to declare the governorate a federal region, while the majority of its members signed an official request addressed to the central government regarding the decision, the Vice President of the Council, Sadiq Al-Husseini, confirmed that the decision was taken without the approval of the province’s official leadership.

The administrative office of Al-Khalis district of Diyala Governorate threatened to separate and join the capital Baghdad in the event that the Council insists on passing the decision to declare the governorate a federal region, while announcing the suspension of work in local government departments and the disruption of schools in protest against the decision.

=== Basra Region ===
Commonly used flag of the Basra Federal Region movement

The Shia Arab-majority city of Basra was proposed for a federal region, a movement that gained significant popularity at the end of 2025 after Iraq's electoral commission (IHEC) officially authorized the collection of signatures for a referendum. This surge was driven by local demands for greater control over the province's vast oil wealth and the Grand Faw Port to address chronic infrastructure failures. By late 2025, the Basra Federal Region (إقليم البصرة) proposal became a mainstream campaign to bypass federal bureaucracy and secure a direct share of national revenues under the Iraqi Constitution.

=== Saladin (Tikrit) Region ===
On 27 October 2011, the Saladin Provincial Council voted, by a majority of more than two-thirds of its members, on the decision to "transform the province into a federal region within a unified Iraq". The then-Prime Minister Nuri al-Maliki criticised the officials and said that the move was initiated by "former members of the now-banned Ba'ath Party [who] want to use the area as a safe haven".

== See also ==
- Governorates of Iraq
- Federation Council of Iraq
- Iraqi-Kurdish conflict
- Federalism in Iraq
