= Jalal al-Din Ali al-Saghir =

Iraqi politician

Sheikh Jalal al-Din Ali al-Sagheer (Arabic: جَلَال الدِّين عَلِيّ الصَّغِير, romanized: Jalāl ud-Dīn ʿAlī aṣ-Ṣaghīr) is an Iraqi politician and a former member of parliament in the Islamic Supreme Council of Iraq. Prior to the 2003 US-led Invasion of Iraq he was the chairman of the Paris Mosque in France. He is the imam of the Shi'a Buratha Mosque in Baghdad.

In May 2005, he was appointed to the committee that drafted the Constitution of Iraq. In December 2005 he was elected to the Iraqi Council of Representatives on the United Iraqi Alliance list.

In April 2006, three suicide bombers killed at least 69 people in an attack at the Buratha Mosque. al-Saghir accused Sunni politicians and clerics of waging "a campaign of distortions and lies against the mosque". Two months later he was the target of another suicide bomber from al-Qaeda in Iraq, who killed 13 people when he blew himself up in the mosque.

In October 2006, he was one of the senior Iraqi clerics who prepared the Mecca Declaration condemning sectarian violence. In November 2006 he clashed in Parliament with Sunni Arab leader Adnan al-Dulaimi, which was shown on live television. He claimed Shiites in some areas were enduring violence that was driving them towards militias and "opening the gates of hell", and that Sunni Arab parliamentarians were inciting the violence.

In February 2007, the Buratha Mosque was searched by Iraqi Special Forces as part of the Baghdad Security Plan after complaints that the mosque was a base for sectarian death squads. In 2007 he was appointed to the parliamentary committee charged with agreeing amendments to the Constitution of Iraq.

In 2014, he created Saraya Ansar al-Aqeeda as a part of Popular Mobilization Forces.

In a January 2018 interview, Saghir stated his support for the authority of the Iranian Islamic theologian and head of state Ali Khamenei.
