= Harith al-Obeidi =

Iraqi politician and cleric

- حارث العبيدي

Member of the Council of Representatives of Iraq
- In office December 2005 – 12 June 2009
- Constituency: Iraqi Accord Front

Personal details
- Born: 1961 (age 64–65) or 1964 (age 61–62) Baghdad, Iraq
- Died: June 12, 2009 (aged 47–48) Baghdad, Iraq
- Party: General Council for the People of Iraq (within Iraqi Accord Front)
- Spouse: Two wives
- Children: Eight
- Education: Al-Mustansiriya University; Baghdad University
- Occupation: Politician, cleric, academic
- Known for: Human rights advocacy; opposition to prison abuse; calls for sectarian reconciliation

Harith Mohey Al Deen Abd al-Obeidi (c. 1961/1964 – 12 June 2009) was an Iraqi politician, Sunni cleric, and member of the Council of Representatives of Iraq, representing the Iraqi Accord Front. He was known for his advocacy on human rights issues and criticism of abuses in Iraqi detention facilities. Al-Obeidi was assassinated on 12 June 2009, outside a mosque in Baghdad.

== Background ==
Obeidi (also transliterated as ʻUbaydī, Ubaidi or Obaidi) was born in Baghdad into a Sunni Arab family. He studied Islamic jurisprudence at Al-Mustansiriya University in Najaf and at the Faculty of Islamic Sharia. He obtained a doctorate in Comparative Jurisprudence from Baghdad University and worked as a writer, academic and lecturer until the invasion of Iraq in 2003. Since the invasion he regularly gave sermons at Sunni-majority mosques.

== Political activity ==
After the invasion of Iraq, Obeidi became an active member of the General Council for the People of Iraq political group.

Although he called for the disarmament of all Iraqi militias, United States troops raided his home in September 2005 after receiving a false tip that he was linked to insurgents.

In January 2006 he called on kidnappers to release the American journalist, Jill Carroll, saying the "abduction and killing of foreigners harms the interest of the people". He also condemned the 5 January 2006 Iraq bombings in Karbala, but blamed the United States, saying "the occupation was responsible for every crime and the death of every citizen in Iraq. If the occupier would leave, Iraqis would live as brothers."

== Human rights ==
Obeidi was elected to the Council of Representatives of Iraq in the December 2005 general election. His party, the General Council for the People of Iraq, was one of the three components of the Iraqi Accord Front electoral list, which won 44 out of 275 seats. Obeidi became the deputy chairman of the Parliament's Human Rights Committee, where he campaigned against abuses in Iraqi prisons. He criticised the Ministry of Human Rights for not holding an inquiry into the treatment of prisoners. He led a parliamentary delegation that visited Justice Ministry prisons, and publicised prisoners' claims of arbitrary arrest, torture and rape. He called for the Defense and Interior Ministers to be summoned before parliament to answer complaints about prison conditions and also sectarian violence. He also called for a general amnesty towards captured Iraqi insurgents. He promoted the repatriation of 130 Algerian citizens who were held in Iraqi jails, accused of involvement in the Iraqi insurgency.

He criticised the Iraqi government over the siege of Sadr City in March 2008, saying the district's residents had suffered enough. He also called on US President Barack Obama to release the blocked photographs of Abu Ghraib torture and prisoner abuse, saying Obama's overtures to the Islamic World in his Cairo speech would fail if he continued with secrecy over detainees or didn't hold abusers accountable. In April 2009 he denounced US troops for killing two Iraqis during a raid on alleged Shiite militias in Kut, saying it was a violation of human rights and their families should be compensated.

== Relations between the Islamic World and the West ==
In October 2008, he was one of the signatories to the Doha Compact, a series of recommendations for how the successor to US President George W. Bush should relate to the Muslim world. These included "living up to the values for which it [America] is admired" and "back off its heavy-handed approach to democratisation in the region".

== Parliamentary leader ==
Obeidi became the leader of the Iraqi Accord Front parliamentary bloc in May 2009 when the previous leader, Ayad al-Samarrai, became the speaker of the Council of Representatives of Iraq.

== Assassination ==
Obeidi was shot twice in the head and killed on 12 June 2009 by a teenage gunman, later named as Ahmad Jassem Ibrahim, whilst in the Al-Shawaf mosque in Yarmouk, western Baghdad. At least five other people died in the attack, including the gunman who was shot by the mosque's security guards. Al Obeidi's killing was condemned by political opponents in the parliament including the Prime Minister Nouri al-Maliki and Shi'ite leader Muqtada al-Sadr, and by the Arab League. A previously unknown Sahwa leader calling himself Abu Issam claimed responsibility for the killing, saying al-Qaeda in Mesopotamia had left arms there for him to use. Days later Iraqi police arrested Ahmed Abed Oweiyed in nearby Ghazaliyah, who they said was a deputy commander of the military wing of Al-Qaeda in Mesopotamia. He was given a state funeral - the first for any Iraq since the 2003 invasion of Iraq. He left two wives and eight children.

== See also ==
- Violence against academics in post-invasion Iraq
