= Jasim Mohammed Jaafar =

Iraqi politician

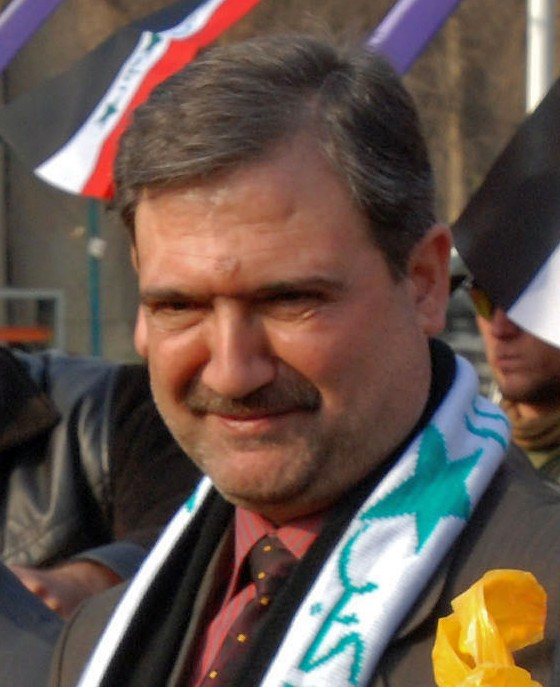
Jasim Mohammed Jaafar in Baghdad, December 2007

Jasim Mohammed Jaafar (Arabic: جاسم محمد جعفر) is an Iraqi politician who served as Minister for Youth & Sports in Nouri al-Maliki's government. He was elected to the post by the Iraqi National Assembly on 20 May 2006, having previously served as the Minister for Construction and Housing in the Iraqi Transitional Government.

Jaafar was born in 1958 in Tuz Khurmatu, Saladin Governorate to Turkmen parents. He went to University of Sulaymaniyah where he obtained a master's degree in civil engineering. He joined the opposition to Saddam Hussein in 1976 and was sentenced to death in 1981. He went into exile to Iraqi Kurdistan and helped found the Islamic Union of Iraqi Turkoman in 1991, becoming its deputy leader.
