= Azhar Abd Al Majeed Husain =

Iraqi biologist and politician

Azhar Abd Al Majeed Husain is an Iraqi biologist. The subject of her research for a master's study was "Taxonomic study of some types of dry beetles. The Histeridae family Coleoptera sheathed wings in some governorates of Iraq."

== Career ==
She served as a member of the Provisional Transitional National Assembly in 2004 and 2005. She held the position of a member of the educational committee in this association.

She also held the position of a member of the Iraqi Council of Representatives for the 2005-2010 electoral cycle for the Iraqi Accordance Front for the governorate of Baghdad, and held the position of a member of the Displaced Persons and Expatriates Committee, and was the commissioner of the committee.
