= Basimah Aziz Nasir =

Iraqi politician

Basimah Aziz Nasir is a member of the Islamic Supreme Council of Iraq and currently a member of the Iraqi Council.
