= Wael Abdul Latif =

Iraqi politician

Wael Abdul Latif (Arabic:وائل عبد اللطيف; born 1950) is an Iraqi politician from the secular Iraqi National List coalition. He was the minister of provincial affairs in the Iraqi Interim Government created following the coalition 2003 invasion of Iraq.

He was born in Basra in 1950. A Shia Muslim, he graduated from the University of Baghdad receiving a law degree in 1973. He served as a judge since the 1980s, including as head judge in Nasiriyah and deputy head judge in Basra. He was imprisoned for a year under Saddam Hussein's regime.

In July 2003, he was appointed governor of Basra and was a member of the Iraqi Governing Council from July 2003 until June 2004. He was a member of the committee that drafted the Constitution of Iraq.

He was elected to the Council of Representatives of Iraq in the Iraqi legislative election of December 2005 as part of the Iraqi National List coalition.

Abdul Latif was an advocate of a Basra Federal Region and in 2008 he submitted a petition for the creation of an autonomous Basra region based on the constitutional precedence of Iraqi Kurdistan. The petition failed and the lack of support for it might have contributed to Abdel Latif ouster from parliament by the next election in 2010.
