= Sabah al-Saedi =

Iraqi politician

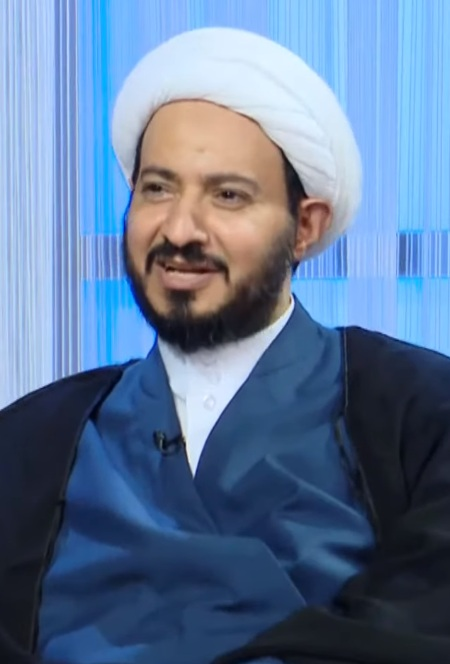
Al-Sa'edi, April 2021.

Sheikh Sabah Julub Falih al-Saedi is an Iraqi politician, who served as a member of the Council of Representatives of Iraq for the Shia Islamic Virtue Party until 2014. He was the deputy chairman of the parliament's Integrity Committee.

Following the Iraqi legislative election of December 2005 al-Saedi acted as a spokesman of the 15 elected MPs of the Islamic Virtue Party.
