= Khalaf al-Ulayyan =

Iraqi politician

Sheikh Khalaf al-Ulayyan (also transliterated as al-`Ulya) is an Iraqi politician and the leader of the Sunni Islamist-led Iraqi National Dialogue Council. The council joined the Iraqi Accord Front to contest the December 2005 general election. In April 2006 the Front nominated Ulayyan for the post of deputy prime minister. He was granted the title of General prior to his withdrawal from the military.

== Quotes ==
"The execution of Saddam Hussein is a big crime. Saddam Hussein was a prisoner of war and was arrested by the US forces, and not by the Iraqi government. It is a crime with which they wanted to cover up many things[...]"
