= Mahmoud al-Radhi =

Iraqi politician

Mahmoud Mohammed al-Radhi is an Iraqi politician from the religious Shia Arab-led Supreme Islamic Iraqi Council, and the Minister of Labour and Social Affairs since May 2006.

In June 2007, he strongly criticised the United States Army for publishing pictures of severely malnourished children in a Baghdad orphanage. He accused the soldiers of setting up the photographs and using tricks to "show the Americans as the humanitarian party". He said it was "a media fabrication exploited by forces opposed to the government".

In October 2008 he was attacked in a suicide car bombing which killed eight passers by.
