= IRDC =

IRDC (Iraq Reconstruction and Development Council) was a group of 150 Iraqi expatriates —most of whom were American citizens— recruited by the Pentagon in March 2003 to assist the Coalition Forces with post-war reconstruction planning after the second Gulf War. The group was headed by Emad Dhia, a former Pfizer Corporation executive. The group was supervised by Abram Shulsky's Office of Special Plans unit in the Pentagon. The 130 or so exiled Iraqi included professionals, academicians, and technocrats who joined the IRDC worked as advisors for the senior advisors of the Coalition Provisional Authority.

The group was the brainchild of Deputy Secretary Paul Wolfowitz and Under Secretary Douglas Feith to bolster cultural awareness and Iraqi outreach. First ORHA and then the CPA used the IRDC's members as technical advisors to Iraq's ministries and provincial offices. Some CPA officials had concerns that some IRDC members brought potentially troublesome political baggage with them, including ties to factions controlled by exile politicians.

The group was later marginalized and sidelined by Americans who view them as foot soldiers rather than partners in policy-making and left shortly after deployment in 2003.

The group was dissolved in June 2004, and some of its members preferred to stay in Iraq.

Some prominent IRDC members:

- Emad Dhia - Director
- Ghanim El Shibly - Ministry of Foreign Affairs
- Sinan Al Shibibi - Central Bank of Iraq
- Sami al-Askari - Baghdad Central and Ministry of Religious Affairs
- Dr Muhammed Al Rubaei - Ministry of Higher Education
- Dr Muhammed Al Najim - Ministry of Higher Education
- Bassim Hilmi
- Adel Rahumi - Baghdad Central
- Dr Hassan Al Janabi - Ministry of Irrigation
- Tawfiq Al Yasiri - Ministry of Interior
- Ibrahim Al Zubaidi - Ministry of Culture
- Ibrahim Ahmed - Ministry of Culture
- George Bakos - Baghdad Central
- Dr Ghassan Ibrahim - Ministry of Electricity
- Abid Kadhim - Ministry of Sports and Youth
- Harry Habib - Ministry of Electricity/Baghdad Central
- Hamid Al Kifaei - Ministry of Culture
- Lamya'a Al Gailani - Ministry of Culture
- Mohammad Abdul Jabbar Al-Shaboot. Ministry of Culture
- Dr Mohammed Ali Zaini - Ministry of Oil
