= 2005 Iraqi elections =

There were two national legislative elections in Iraq in 2005:

2005 Iraqi elections may refer to:

- January 2005 Iraqi parliamentary election for an assembly to draft a Constitution and
- December 2005 Iraqi parliamentary election for the first assembly under the new constitution

There was also a local election held in 2005:

- 2005 Iraqi governorate elections, held in Iraq on 30 January 2005
