= Flag of Iraq =

Republic of Iraq
- Use: State and war flag, civil ensign
- Proportion: 2∶3 (not formalised by law)
- Adopted: 22 January 2008; 18 years ago (current design); 31 July 1963; 63 years ago (original three-star design)
- Design: A horizontal tricolour of red, white, and black, charged with الله أكبر (the takbīr) in green Kufic script, centered on the white stripe.
- Designed by: Jawad Saleem (original three-star design)
- Vertical

Since the 1958 Iraqi coup d'état, the various republican governments of Iraq have used a number of different flags, all featuring the pan-Arab colors of green, black, white, and red. The current official and internationally recognized flag of Iraq (علم العراق) was adopted in 2008 as a temporary compromise, and consists of the three equal horizontal red, white, and black stripes of the Arab Liberation Flag, that was first used by Gamal Abdel Nasser during the Egyptian Revolution, with the takbīr written in green in the Kufic script that was originally added by Saddam Hussein following the Gulf War.

This basic tricolour has been in use since its adoption on 31 July 1963, with several changes to the green symbols on the central white stripe; the most recent version adopted on 22 January 2008 bears the takbīr rendered in dark green and removes the three green stars present since 1963. The flag was initially meant to be temporary, but has remained the official flag ever since.

== Colour scheme ==
Valid for Iraqi flags 1963–present

	Red	White	Green	Black
RGB	205/17/37	255/255/255	1/123/61	0/0/0
Hexadecimal	#cd1125	#ffffff	#017b3d	#000000
CMYK	0/92/82/20	0/0/0/0	99/0/50/52	0/0/0/100

== History ==
=== Kingdom of Iraq (1921–1958) ===
10 July 1924 – 1 January 1959 (ratio: 1:2)

The first flag of modern Iraq was in Mandatory Iraq, and was adopted in 1921. It was a black-white-green horizontal flag, with a red triangle extending from the mast side, inspired by the flag of the Arab Revolt. It was soon changed to a new version with a red trapezoid replacing the triangle containing two, seven-point white stars denoting the Tigris River and the Euphrates River. Both designs also reflected the newly installed Hashemite dynasty in Iraq (originally from the Hejaz in the Arabian Peninsula), who had played a leading role in the Arab Revolt. As such, it was similar to the flags of Hashemite Transjordan, and the short-lived Kingdom of Hejaz. The new flag continued to be used in the Kingdom of Iraq.

=== Iraq as part of the Arab Federation (1958) ===
23 August 1921 – 10 July 1924 (ratio: 1:2), reused as Flag of the Arab Federation, of which Iraq was part, January 1, 1958 – December 31, 1958

In 1958, in response to the merger of Egypt and Syria in the United Arab Republic, the two Hashemite kingdoms of Iraq and Jordan established the Arab Federation, a confederation of the two states. The flag of the union was essentially that of Jordan but without the seven pointed star in the red triangle. This flag is identical to the flag of Palestine adopted in 1964, and almost identical to the flag of the Ba'ath Party. The union lasted less than six months, being terminated by the Iraqi Revolution of 1958 in July.

=== Qasimist Iraq (1959–1963) ===
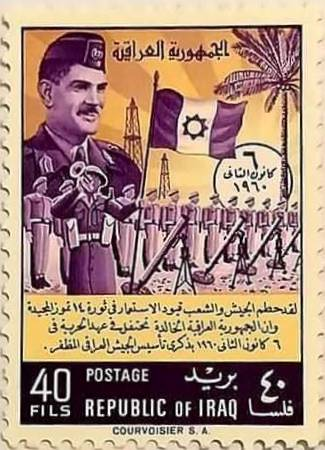
An Iraqi postage stamp of 40 fils issued in 1960 to commemorate the anniversary of the founding of the Iraqi Army, with one of the soldiers in the stamp holding the Qasimist Iraqi flag.

January 1, 1959 – July 31, 1963 (ratio: 1:2)

Following the Revolution of 14 July 1958, led by Abd al-Karim Qasim, which abolished the Hashemite monarchy in Iraq and turned the country into a republic, Iraq adopted a new flag (Law 102 of 1959) that consisted of a black-white-green vertical tricolour, with a red eight-pointed star with a yellow circle at its centre. The black, white, green, and red are the Pan-Arab colors, representing pan-Arabism, with the yellow Kurdish Sun in the middle to represent the Iraqi Kurds, surrounded by the red Star of Ishtar to represent the indigenous Assyrians.

After the fall of the Ba'athist regime in 2003, the 1959 design was considered for readoption. However, it was rejected by Iraqis who associated it with Abd al-Karim Qasim’s radicalism and objected to the vertical layout, which departed from the horizontal tricolour format standard in the Arab world.

The 1959 flag was relegalized and flown in the Kurdistan Region following the 2003 invasion. Some Kurdish leadership preferred it as a national symbol because it was the only flag to acknowledge their identity. It remained in limited unofficial use until 2008, when the Iraqi parliament removed the three stars (commonly associated with the Ba'ath and Nasserist leadership among Kurdish Iraqis) from the national flag, leading the Kurdistan Regional Government to adopt the revised federal banner.

=== Ba'athist Iraq (1963–2004) ===
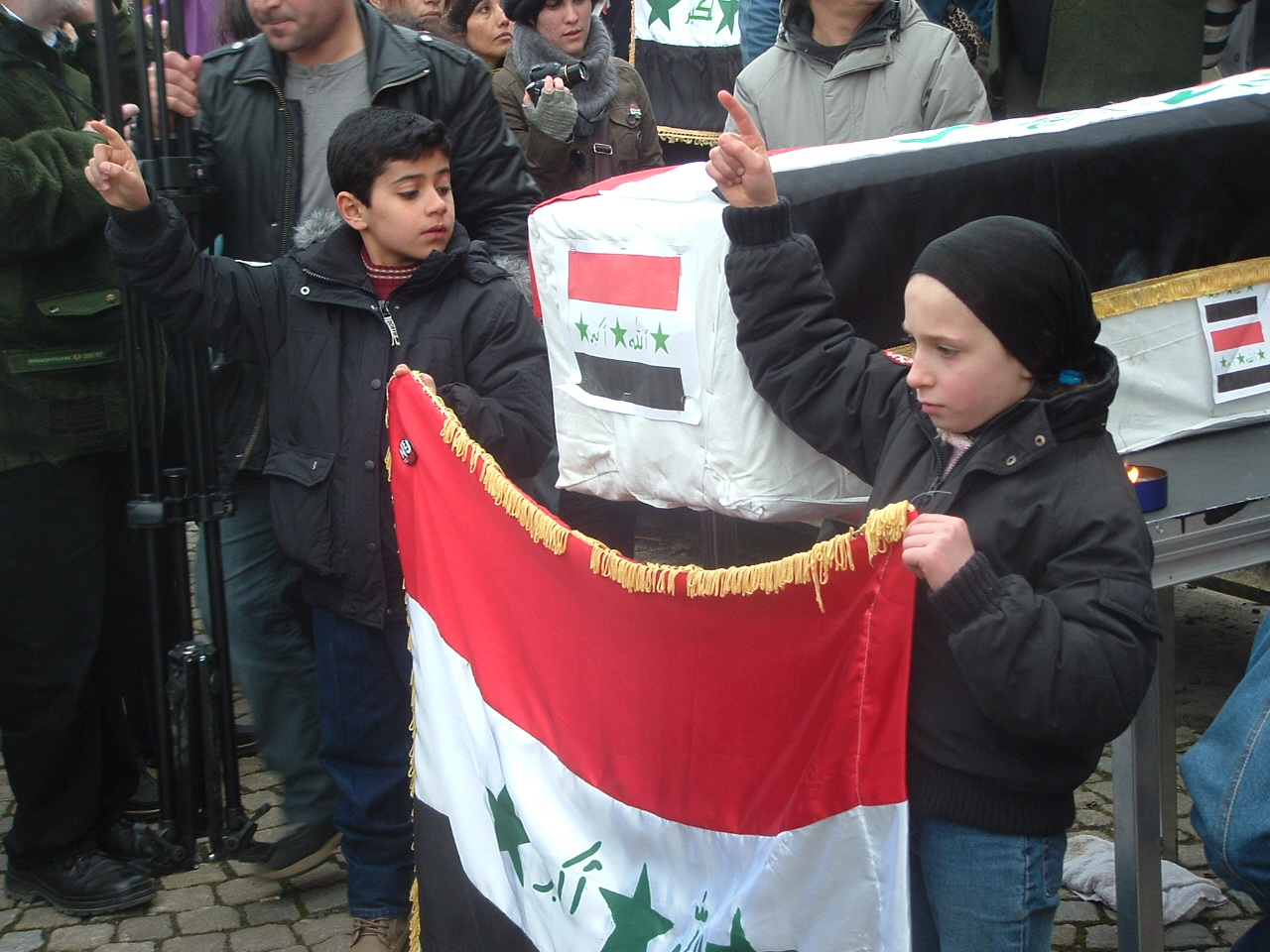
The Ba'athist-era flag seen at an Iraqi solidarity event in Sweden

After the 1963 Ramadan Revolution led to the overthrow of Qasim, the new government adopted a new national flag to represent the Nasserist ideology endorsed by President Abdul Salam Arif, officially replacing the flag adopted by Qasim on July 31 of 1963 with Law 28 of 1963.

During his rule, Saddam Hussein made two significant changes to the 1963 flag. First, he reinterpreted the three stars in the Flag Law No. 33 of 1986 to represent the Ba'ath Party's motto Waḥda, Ḥurriyya, Ishtirākiyya ("unity, freedom, and socialism"). Second, in January 1991, amid the Gulf War and as a prelude to the Faith Campaign, he added the takbīr ("Allahu akbar") between the stars to gain religious support and emphasize Iraq's Islamic identity, moving away from the Ba'ath Party's traditional secular stance. The form of the takbīr was said to be Saddam's own handwriting.

The 1963 flag reemerged during the 2012–2013 Iraqi protests, adopted by many Sunni Arabs as the distinctive ethnic flag to represent Iraqi Sunni Arabs as a whole and a reference to a time when Iraq was dominated by Sunni leadership and perceived as more favorable and secure for Sunnis. Its meaning shifted from a former national flag to one associated with Sunni Arab identity and political expression. Shias and other minority groups in Iraq today generally do not identify with the flag, viewing it primarily as a symbol of Sunni Arab identity and Ba'athist political legacy rather than a unifying national emblem, despite originally being an inherently non-sectarian symbol with Nasserist origins.

=== 2004–2008 ===
Proposed flag, 2004 (later abandoned) during American occupation.

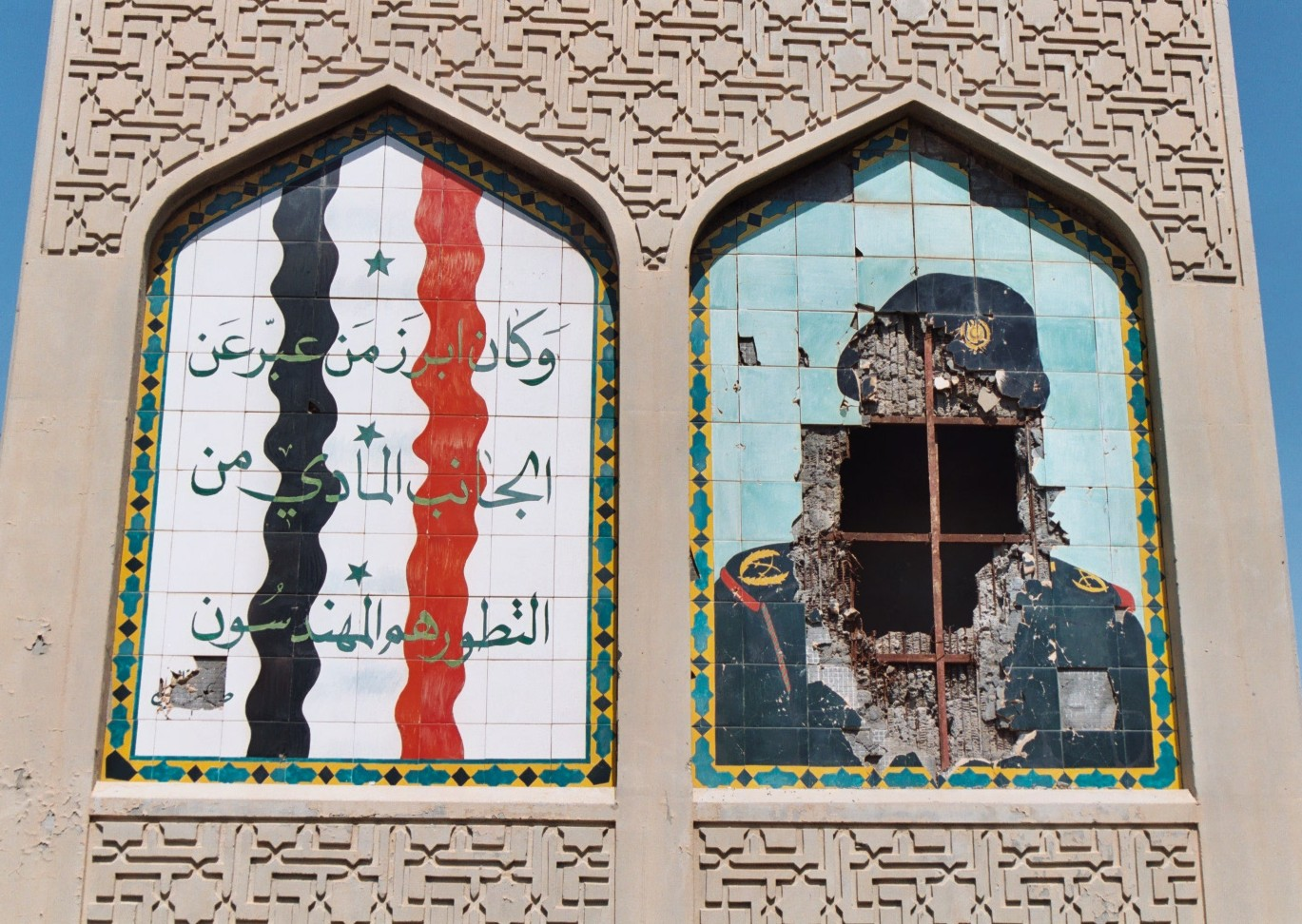
A mural with the flag alongside an image of Saddam Hussein, destroyed by the Coalition forces during the Iraq War (2007)

Owing to differing views on a flag proposed by the United States-appointed administration, and the prevailing opposition to an outright abandonment of the current Iraqi flag, a compromise measure was adopted by the U.S.-appointed Iraqi interim administration in 2004. The basic form of the existing flag was retained; however, the takbīr was rendered in traditional stylized Kufic script, as opposed to the handwriting of Saddam Hussein.

The modified flag was unveiled at the ceremony marking the technical "handover" of power from the Coalition Provisional Authority occupation forces to the U.S.-appointed administration on 28 July 2004.

Although the 2004 version of the Iraqi flag was introduced as a transitional design intended to reduce overt associations with Saddam Hussein's regime, the current Government of Iraq continues to regard all iterations of the three star flag featuring the takbir between the stars as symbols linked to Ba'athist rule. In March 2025, police in Baghdad arrested a resident of the Sumer district after he raised the 2004 flag over his home, reportedly citing it as an expression of allegiance to the former regime.

=== 2008–present ===
22 January 2008 – present flag of Iraq (ratio: 2:3)

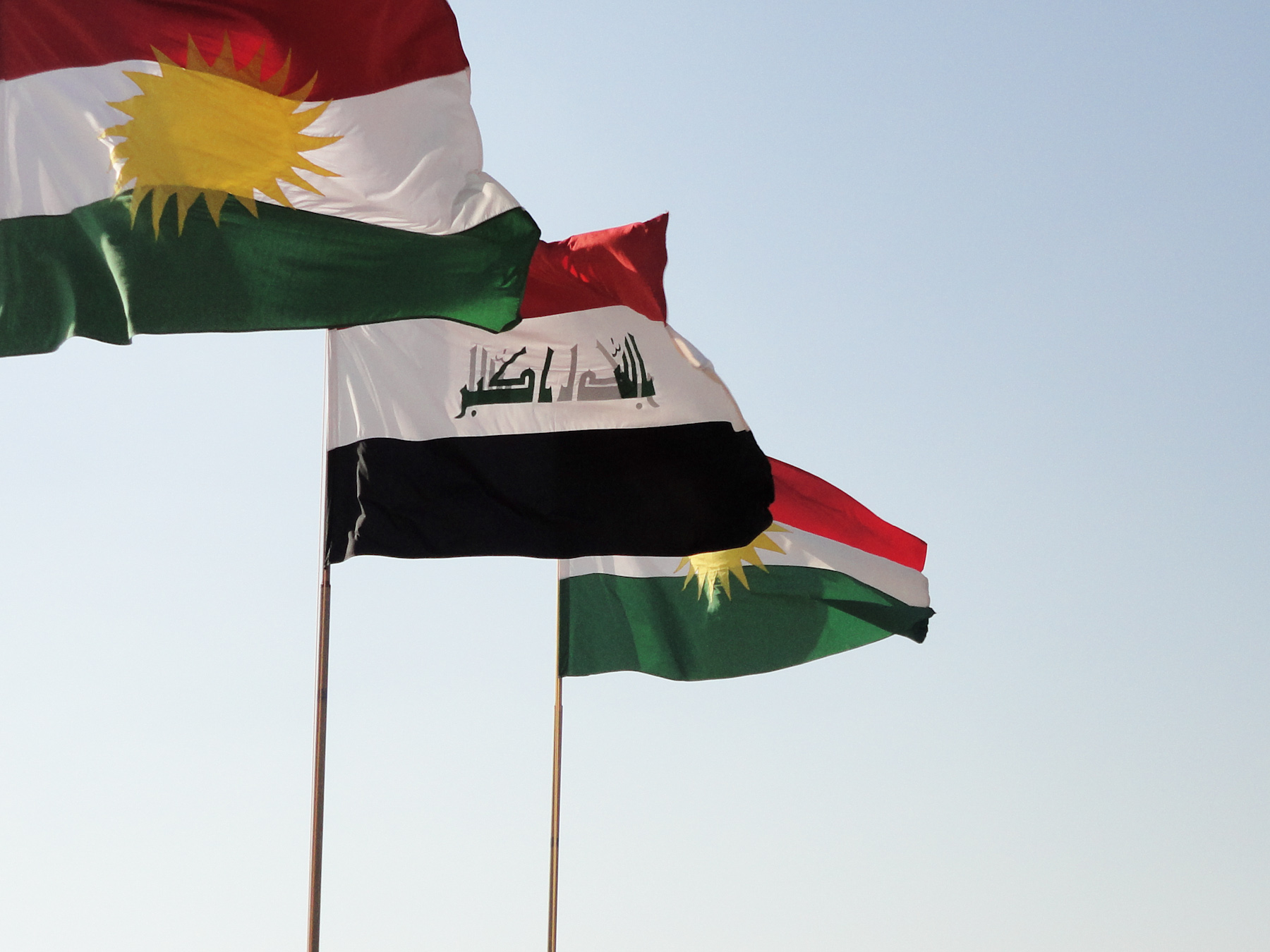
Flag of Iraq being flown alongside the Flag of Kurdistan in Erbil (2011)

On 22 January 2008, the Council of Representatives of Iraq approved its new design for the national flag, confirmed by Law 9 of 2008 as the compromising temporary replacement for the Ba'athist Saddam-era flag. In this current version, the three stars were removed, leaving only the takbīr (which confused some Iraqis, as this was the part added to the flag by Saddam himself), with the two words of the takbīr being brought closer together and rendered in bold, and corrected the previous spelling of Allah (ألله to الله). The removal of the three stars was demanded by the Kurdish population of Iraq, who associated the three stars with the Al-Anfal genocide. But their removal provoked criticism among non-Kurdish Iraqis, mainly Iraqi Arabs, who argued that the stars did not represent the Ba'athist regime, and the city of Fallujah refused to fly the temporary flag that year unless instructed otherwise. The parliament intended for the new design to last one year, after which a final decision on the flag would be made. However, the flag law was reviewed in parliament on 30 August 2009.

== Symbolism ==
The Iraqi flag consists of four colours: red, white, green and black, inspired by the poetic verse of Safi al-Din al-Hilli: "Our actions are bright, our battlefields are dark, our lands are green, and our swords are red with the blood of our enemies".

== Specifications ==
22:January 2008 – present flag of Iraq (ratio: 2:3)

The flag is in the form of a rectangle, the width of which is two-thirds of its length, and it consists of three horizontal bands of equal dimensions, the top in red, the middle in white, and the bottom in black, and the words ʾAllāhu ʾakbar "الله اكبر" in Kufic script coloured green is in the middle of the middle white rectangle.

== Flag proposals and flag contest ==
=== 2004 flag proposal and controversy ===
Following the military invasion of Iraq by the United States in 2003, the Iraqi government was overthrown, and the Ba'ath party was outlawed. Strong speculation followed that the U.S. government would press for a change in the Iraqi flag to remove its pan-Arab symbolism, and to make a definitive break with the period of Ba'athist rule. To a degree, this view was shared by some groups in Iraq. In addition to some displeasure among Iraqis who had suffered under Saddam Hussein to retaining national symbols used by his government, there was also strong aversion to the flag from Iraq's Kurdish minority, who resented its evocation of pan-Arabism. However, Iraqi opponents of changing the flag argued that since the flag had been used since 1963, long before Saddam Hussein's presidency, it was unfair to characterise it as a "Saddamist" flag. They also stressed that pan-Arabism has been a dominant popular principle among Iraqi's majority population for decades prior to Iraqi independence in 1932.

On 14 August 2004 the U.S.-appointed Iraqi Governing Council (IGC) announced a new flag during Saddam's Iraq. The IGC stated that, from around 30 competing entries, it had chosen a design by the distinguished Iraqi artist-architect Rifat Chadirji, who lived in London, and is a brother of a member of the IGC. Chadirji commented that the guidelines stipulated that Iraq should be portrayed as part of the Western world, with historical elements included. The simplicity of his design was inspired by the flags of Canada and Switzerland, and it also shares elements (a crescent, stripes, a light blue shade) with the flag of his ethnic group, the Iraqi Turkmen.

The proposed flag had several meanings:

Symbol	Meaning
White background	Purity
Two blue bands	The blue bands represent the Tigris and the Euphrates rivers.
Yellow band	Kurdish minority. The flag of Kurdistan features a yellow sun.
Blue crescent	The crescent represents Islam. The shade of blue represents Iraqi Turkmens.

Proposed flag, 2004 (later abandoned) during American occupation.

The design marked a notable break with the three flags of modern Iraqi history (namely the Arab Revolt-inspired flag of the Kingdom, the flag introduced by Abd al-Karim Qasim, and the Arab Liberation inspired flag of 1963), all of which were based on the four Pan-Arab colours. Indeed, of these colours, only white was represented in the IGC design. Moreover, Islamic crescents are usually depicted in green or red in Arab heraldry. The proposed change provoked an intensely negative reaction across groups of Iraq's Arab majority, including those vehemently opposed to Saddam Hussein. Those opposed to the U.S. occupation, including Shi'a cleric Muqtada al-Sadr, decried the design as an attempt by the U.S. government to strip Iraq of its identity, and its historically prominent role in the Arab world. In particular, critics lamented the proposed abandonment of the Arab Liberation Flag, the omission of the traditional colours of pan-Arabism, and the removal of the takbīr.

Additionally, the new flag's predominantly blue-on-white appearance immediately antagonized many in Iraq because of the claim that it was similar to the flag of Israel.

The new flag was reported to have been burned by insurgents in Fallujah on 27 April 2004, the day before its planned official adoption.

On 28 April 2004, IGC President Masoud Barzani formally presented a modified version of the flag in which the originally very light shade of blue as reported by the press on 26 April 2004 had been changed to a darker tone. It was unclear whether this was a change made because of the protests made against the original design or, as the Council claimed, a rectification of printing errors in the earlier news reports. Barzani also explained that the flag was a temporary design, to be used over the ensuing months until the adoption of a definitive flag.

In the face of the overwhelming public outcry, adoption of the blue crescent flag was abandoned entirely.

=== 2008 flag proposals ===
First proposal, 2008

Second proposal, 2008

Despite the compromise in 2004, opposition to the flag persisted from Kurdish groups. In January 2008, a new design was proposed, removing the three green stars, instead placing a green eight pointed star around a yellow circle in the middle of the takbīr, which is written in the Kufic script and prized as a Mesopotamian Arabic style, having originated in Iraq. In July 2008, the Iraqi parliament launched a contest to design a new Iraqi flag. The contest ran until September 2008, with 50 designs submitted. Six designs were chosen and sent to the parliament which was to choose a new flag before the end of 2008. Another proposed design was also similar to the 2004–2008 flag, but the script was changed to yellow to represent the Kurdish people in northern Iraq. The meaning of the three stars would be changed to symbolize peace, tolerance and justice.

=== 2020s flag proposal (Proposed Flag Initiative) ===
Third proposal, 2020s

Commonly used flag of the Basra Federal Region movement

Alternative design

Alternative horizontal design

The "Proposed Flag Initiative" was launched in the 2020s and acknowledged by Creative Iraq, a Baghdad-based nationalist design group, the initiative developed a new national flag design to replace the temporary design from 2008. The flag was designed intentionally to remove the Nasserist and Ba'athist influence on the design of the flag, in order to create a distinct, secular flag for the country that acknowledges the shared Mesopotamian heritage of Iraq rather than Nasserist Pan-Arabism. The flag readopts the Qasimist-era Ishtar Star.

Parallel to this national movement, a similar blue-white-green tricolor has been adopted by proponents of the Basra Federal Region to represent their local identity and economic aspirations. As this new tricolor has gained visibility, it has become increasingly synonymous with a rising wave of Iraqi nationalism and a "post-Ba'athist" identity among the country's politically active population, following the 2019–2021 Iraqi protests. For many, the adoption of these colors represents a broader shift toward a civic-centered Iraqi identity that emphasizes the nation's unique geography and indigenous history over the Pan-Arab motifs of the past.

== Subnational flags ==
=== Minority ethnic flags ===
Flag	Date	Ratio	Use
	1920–present (adopted in 2005)	2:3	Flag of Kurdistan, used in Kurdistan Region
	1994–present (unofficial)	2:3	Flag used by Iraqi Turkmen
	1971–present (unofficial)	2:3	Flag used by Assyrians
	2000s–present (unofficial)	2:3	Flag used by Yazidis

=== Governorates ===
Flag	Date	Ratio	Use
	?–present	2:3	Flag of Al Anbar Governorate
	?–present	2:3	Flag of Babil Governorate
	?–present	2:3	Flag of Baghdad Governorate
	?–present	2:3	Flag of Basra Governorate
	?–?	2:3	Former flag of Basra Governorate
	?–present	2:3	Flag of Diyala Governorate
	?–present	2:3	Flag of Halabja Governorate
	?–present	2:3	Flag of Muthanna Governorate
	?–present	2:3	Flag of Nineveh Governorate
	?–present	2:3	Flag of Saladin Governorate
	–2025	2:3	Flag of Kirkuk Governorate
	?–2025	2:3	Former flag of Kirkuk Governorate
	?–present	1:2	Flag of Sulaymaniyah Governorate
	?–present	2:3	Flag of Wasit Governorate

== Gallery ==
=== Military flags ===
Flag	Date	Use
Current
	?–present	Flag of the Iraqi Ground Forces
	?–present	Flag of the Iraqi Air Force
	2003–present	Flag of the Iraqi Navy
	2007–present	Flag of the Iraqi Counter Terrorism Service
	?–present	Special Operations Iraq Flag
	?–present	Flag of Shabak Militia
	?–present	Flag of the 1st Division
	?–present	Flag of the 2nd Division
Former
	?–2003	Ba'athist-era flag of the Iraqi Navy
	?–2003	Flag of Fedayeen Saddam
	2003	Flag of the Free Iraqi Forces
	14 May 2004 – 31 December 2009	Flag of the Multi-National Force – Iraq
	1 January 2010 – 15 December 2011	Flag of the United States Forces – Iraq

=== Political/Rebel flags ===
Flag	Date	Ratio	Use	Description
Current
	2004–present	2:3	Flag of the Army of the Men of the Naqshbandi Order, Supreme Command for Jihad and Liberation, Free Iraqi Army, and the Islamic Front for the Iraqi Resistance.	Former Ba'athist national flag, used as a rebel symbol against the federal government of Iraq.
	?–present	2:3	Flag of the Kurdistan Democratic Party	
		2:3	Proposed flags for the Basra Federal Region	
	?–present	2:3	Flag of the Babylon Movement	
	?–present		Flag of the Assyrian Democratic Movement	
	?–present		Flag of Nineveh Plain Protection Units	
	?–present	2:3	Flag of the Iraqi Communist Party	
	?–present	2:3	Flag of the Iraqi National Congress	
	?–?	2:3	Flag of the Iraqi National Congress	
	?–present	2:3	Flag of the Islamic Dawa Party	
	?–present	2:3	Flag of the Patriotic Union of Kurdistan	
	2005–present	2:3	Flag of the Kurdistan Workers' Party	
	2018–present	2:3	Flag of the Turkish Intervention in Northern Iraq	
	?–present	2:3	Flag of the Yazidi Movement for Reform and Progress	
	?–present	1:2	Flag of the Kurdistan Islamic Movement	
	?–present		Flag of Hezbollah Movement in Iraq	
	?–present	2:3	Flag of the Islamic Supreme Council of Iraq	
	?–present	2:3	Flag of the Popular Mobilization Forces	
	?–present		Flag of Kata'ib Hezbollah	
	?–present		Flag of Kataib Sayyid al-Shuhada	
	?–present	2:3	Flag of the Iraqi Turkmen Front	
	?–present		Flag of the Kurdistan Justice Group	
	2024–present		Flag of the Kurdistan Islamic Relations Movement	
	?–present		Flag of the Islamic State	
	?–present	2:3	Flag of Arab Socialist Ba'ath Party – Iraq Region	
	?–present	2:3	Flag of White Flags	
Former
		2:3	Flag of the Free Iraqi Army	
		2:3	Flag of the Arab Socialist Union	
			Flag of Islamic Army of Iraq	
		2:3	Flag of the Kurdistan Brigades	
			Flag of Al-Qaeda in Iraq	
		2:3	Flag of the Sons of Iraq	
			Flag of Jama'at al-Tawhid wal-Jihad	
			Flag of the Mahdi Army	
			Flag of Ansar al-Islam	
			Flag of the Iraqi Islamic Resistance Army	
			Flag of Islamic State of Iraq	
			Flag of Ansar al-Sunnah	
			Flag of Abu Bakr Al-Salafi Army	
		2:3	Flag of Hamas of Iraq	
		2:3	Flag of Promised Day Brigade	
			Flag of the Anbar Tribal Council	

== See also ==
- Coat of arms of Iraq
- Pan-Arab colors
- Flag of the Arab Revolt
- Flag of Egypt
- Flag of Jordan
- Flag of Kuwait
- Flag of Palestine
- Flag of Sudan
- Flag of Syria
- Flag of the United Arab Emirates
- Flag of Yemen
