= Iraqi Turkmen Islamic Union =

Iraqi Turkmen Islamic Union الاتحاد الإسلامي لتركمان العراق
- Secretary-General: Abbas al-Bayati
- Deputy Secretary General: Jasim Mohammed Jaafar
- Founded: 1991
- Ideology: Iraqi Turkmen interests
- National affiliation: State of Law Coalition
- Seats in the Council of Representatives of Iraq: 0 / 325
- Seats in the local governorate councils: 0 / 440

The Iraqi Turkmen Islamic Union (Arabic: الاتحاد الإسلامي لتركمان العراق; Turkish: Irak Türkmen İslam Birliği) is a Shia Islamist political party made up of Iraqi Turkmen led by Abbas al-Bayati. It was formed during the 1991 Iraqi uprisings and established relations with other Iraqi rebel groups, mostly Kurdish or Shia Arab, before the invasion of Iraq.

In the elections in January 2005 and December 2005 it joined with other Shiite parties in the United Iraqi Alliance.

The deputy leader of the party is Jasim Mohammed Jaafar, who was the Minister of Housing and Construction in the 2005 Iraqi Transitional Government and Minister of Youth and Sports in the 2006 government of Nouri al-Maliki.

== See also ==
- List of Islamic political parties
