= Iraqi National Dialogue Council =

Sunni Arab political party

The Iraqi National Dialogue Council is a Sunni Islamist political party initially established as an umbrella organization of approximately ten smaller Sunni parties to take part in the 2005 Iraqi Constitution drafting process. The party was founded by Saleh al-Mutlaq and Khalaf al-Ulayyan. During the Iraqi Constitution drafting negotiations in 2005, the party was advised by Sadoun al-Zubaydi, an Iraqi foreign policy expert and former personal translator to Saddam Hussein. In the lead-up to the December 2005 elections, Mutlaq left the National Dialogue Council and formed his own party and gave it a similar name: the Iraqi National Dialogue Front. 'Ulayan now leads the party, which is the smallest of three parties that compose the Iraqi Accord Front (Tawafuq) coalition. The parties which compose the organisation originate from Iraq's wider Arab populated region.

A member of the INDC, Mahmoud al-Mashhadani, was the speaker of the Council of Representatives from May 2006 until June 2007.

On, April 12, 2007, Mohammed Awad a member of the Iraqi National Dialogue Council was killed in the Green Zone at the convention centre canteen of the parliament building in Baghdad.
