= Mithal al-Alusi List =

Former Iraqi political coalition

The Mithal al-Alusi list was one of the coalitions of Iraqi political parties that ran in the December 2005 elections. It was formed from the Iraqi Federalist Gathering and the Iraqi Ummah Party The coalition won 0.3% of the popular vote, thus receiving one seat, which was taken by its name-bearer, Mithal al-Alusi.
