= Humam Hamoudi =

Iraqi Islamist politician, leader of the Supreme Islamic Iraqi Council

- همام حمودي
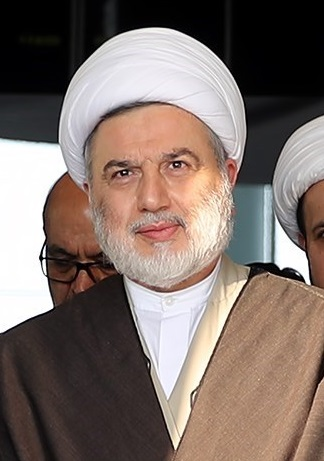

President of the Islamic Supreme Council of Iraq
- Incumbent
- Assumed office 1 August 2017
- Preceded by: Ammar al-Hakim

Personal details
- Born: 1 July 1956 (age 69) Baghdad, Iraq
- Party: Islamic Supreme Council of Iraq

Humam Hamoudi (Sheikh Humam Baqir Abdulmajid Hamoudi) (Arabic: الشيخ همام باقر عبد المجيد حمودي) is an Iraqi politician who is currently leader of the Supreme Islamic Iraqi Council. He is a member of the Coordination Framework.

== Role in the Iraqi Constitution ==
Hamoudi was Chairman of the Committee that drafted the Iraqi Constitution in 2005. Although the constitution was ratified, there were complaints by many of the drafters as well as observers that the process was rushed, incomplete and failed to accommodate legitimate Sunni concerns. Others have complained that some of the more hardline Sunni elements, among them Salih Mutlaq, had demands that were unreasonable, including opposition to a ban on Saddam's Ba'ath party and a refusal to consider any form of federalism beyond the Kurdish region. The United States, and Donald Rumsfeld in particular, pushed hard for resolution, and it is clear that Hamoudi favored moving forward and pushing off at least some of these issues for later. On the basis of a promise to reopen negotiations over the Constitution, the largest Sunni faction in the Iraqi Parliament, the moderate Iraqi Islamic Party, did not oppose the Constitution's passing, though harder line Sunnis, Mutlaq among them, remained vocally opposed.

By accounts of US Embassy officials near to the drafting process, and specifically Jeffrey Beals, Hamoudi was among the least partisan of the Shi'ite faction, though ultimately he did advocate forcefully for their position, particularly on federalism, after the Kurdish factions continued to insist on maximum regional control of the Kurdish region. Hamoudi has made statements that suggest that he is unwilling to make compromises to the Constitution at this point, though again complaints arise in the opposite direction that the Sunni position of opposition to all forms of federalism is similarly unreasonable. Most neutral reports tend to blame all factions for the current impasse, rather than Hamoudi personally or the Shi'ite factions he represents.

Hamoudi is currently (August 2007) the Chairman of the Constitution Review Committee, the parliamentary committee charged with making changes to the constitution in order to make it more acceptable to the Sunnis. In particular, most Sunnis as well as Sadrists are against the specific arrangements regarding regionalism. A recent article by Hamoudi in the Stanford Law Review suggests that "the majority are not bound to consider all that is demanded by the minority" (italics added). The term "consider", however, may be a mistranslation of Hamoudi's sentiments (he does not speak English), as the English in the article is clearly not of a very high quality generally, and the same Article makes clear Hamoudi's willingness to discuss many of these issues in the Constitutional Review Committee proceedings. It seems from the context that he meant that there is no obligation to accede to all of the demands of the Sunni parties. Certainly, however, it is not clear that Hamoudi, or the Sunnis with whom most of the negotiations are taking place, are very willing to make any compromises of significance at this point in time.

In addition to his role in the constitution, Hamoudi was on the three man committee appointed by the UIA to decide on an alternative to Prime Minister Ibrahim al-Jaafari in February 2006. He is also the chief of the Parliamentary Foreign Relations Committee.
