= Iraqi Turkmen Brotherhood Party =

Political party in Iraq

The Iraqi Turkmen Brotherhood Party (Turkish: Irak Türkmen Kardeşlik Partisi, Arabic: حزب أخوة تركمان العراق) is a political party in Iraq led by Walid Sharika. It is made up of Iraqi Turkmen and is part of the Kurdistani Alliance.

The party is pro-Kurdistan Region, and its leader, Walid Sharika, criticised Turkmen politicians who insist that Kirkuk is a city only for Turkmen, characterizing some of them as "'spies and agents' of a foreign power". The rival Turkmen parties of it believe it to be a proxy of leading Kurdish parties, whereas it believes its Turkmen rivals to be proxies of Turkey against the territorial integrity of Iraq.

The party is controlled by kurds
