= Adnan al-Dulaimi =

Iraqi politician

Adnan al-Dulaimi (Arabic: عدنان الدليمي, 1932 – 3 May 2017) was a Sunni Iraqi politician who became prominent following the US invasion of Iraq in 2003 and the fall of the regime of Saddam Hussein. He and his supporters largely focused on two issues: ending the US occupation of Iraq; and strengthening and protecting the position of the country's Sunni Arab minority at a time when the country's Shiite Arab majority was ascending politically.

== Personal background ==
At the time of the invasion, he was an Islamic studies professor at Baghdad University, but soon after the fall of Saddam Hussein he became head of the Sunni Endowment Office, or Waqf, a quasi-government agency charged with overseeing Sunni mosques and the distribution of some of their donations. The government removed him from that post in August 2005, drawing protests from a number of Sunni groups, among them the Association of Muslim Scholars, a federation of Sunni clerics that favors a Sunni-inflected version of Islamic law for Iraq.

== Political affiliations ==
He was a leader of the General Council for the People of Iraq, a component of the Iraqi Accord Front (IAF) which won 44 seats in the December 2005 general election. He had been a leading Sunni Arab politician since the fall of Saddam Hussein and was often at odds with the country's Shiite-led government, complaining that "our participation in this so-called national unity government is weak and marginalized and our ministers have no authority to serve Iraq or its people."

== Political opponents, attacks, and legal troubles ==
He has been accused by political opponents of seeking to sow discord inside Iraq.

Dulaimi has survived multiple assassination attempts. A 22 February 2006 attack on his car killed one bodyguard and wounded five others. After the attack, Dulaimi called for restraint. "I don't accuse anyone. ... I consider it accidental, and I call on my brothers for self-restraint and to contain what happened because Iraq is bigger than Adnan and his guards," Dulaimi said.

In March 2007, the Central Investigating Court of Baghdad requested an investigation into Dulaimi and his sons, Makki and Munqidh, following complaints of forced displacement and sectarian killings in the Al-Adel district of western Baghdad which had been relayed by Sheikh Jalal al-Din Ali al-Saghir, a Shi'ite imam and member of the Council of Representatives from a neighbouring area. The Council of Representatives asked for Dulaimi's parliamentary immunity to be lifted.

In July 2007 he resigned as leader of the Iraqi Accord Front.

In November 2007, his son Makki and a number of Dulaimi's bodyguards were arrested after security forces found two car bombs near his office and his house in al-Adel neighborhood. Adnan al-Dulaimi was briefly put under house arrest. President of Iraq, Jalal Talabani sent a group of his personal guards (peshmerga) to protect al-Dulaimi.

In August 2008 his son Al Muthanna was arrested and accused of involvement in terrorism and sectarian killings. Iraqi security forces said he was arrested while placing a bomb in the house of a displaced family in Western Baghdad. A warrant for his arrest was issued charging him with multiple killings and forcing people from their homes. An MP from Dulaimi's party said the arrests were aimed at damaging relations between the Iraqi Accord Front and the government of Nouri al-Maliki.
