= Members of the Iraqi Constitution Drafting Committee =

The members of the Iraqi Constitution Drafting Committee were appointed by the Iraqi Transitional Government on 12 May 2005 to draft a new constitution for Iraq.

The breakdown of members by political affiliation was:

- United Iraqi Alliance - 28
- Democratic Patriotic Alliance of Kurdistan - 15
- The Iraqis - 8
- Communist Party of Iraq - 1
- Iraqi Turkmen Front - 1
- National Rafidain List - 1
- Sunni Arab nominee - 1 (later expanded to 15)

The original 55 members were:

- Ahmed Al-Safi
- Abdel Hadi Al-Hakim
- Dr Ali Al-Dabagh
- Dr Hussein ‘Athab Th’ban
- Nouri Al-Maliki
- Ali al-Adeeb
- Beha’ Al-A’reji
- Dr Jeneen Al-Qedou
- Sami ‘Azaze Al-Ma’joun
- Dr Aboud Al-‘Isawi
- Dr Hamam Hamoudi
- Akram Al-Hakim
- Jalal Al-Deen Al-Sagheer
- Dr Sa’ad Qendeel
- Sami Al-‘Askeri
- Dr Jouad Smeisim
- Dr Nadim al-Jabiri
- ‘Abass Al-Bayati
- Sheerouan Al-Ouaili
- Dr Khadheer Moussa Ja’fr Al-Khaza’i
- Ali Al-Safi
- Dr Muhsen Al-Qazwini
- ‘Aqila Al-Dehan
- Zehra’ Al-Hashemi
- Al-Tefat Abed Al-Sa’ed
- Mareem Al-Raes
- Aman Al-‘Asdi
- Najehe Abed Al-Emir
- Dr Fouad M’soum
- Dr S’di Berzenji
- Freedoun Abed Al-Qader
- Dr Mundher Al-Fadhl
- Dr Hussein Balissani
- Abed Al-Khaleq Zengena
- Sami Ahmed Ali Shebek
- Nergez Majeed
- Dara Nour Al-Deen
- Ahmed Wahab Majeed
- Deendar Shafeeq
- Hamid Majid Mousa
- Adel Naser
- Mouneera ‘Abdoul
- Nouri Boutros
- Kamran Khairi Sa’id
- Yonadam Kanna
- Riadh Kehia
- Abed al-Rahmen al-Na’imi
- Qasem Daud
- Oua’el Abel Al-Latif
- Adnan Al-Janabi
- Rasem Al-Ouadi
- Hussein Al-Sha’lan
- Dr Radha Al-Khaza’i
- Thamer Al-Khadhban
- Taher Al-Baka’
