= Mithal al-Alusi =

Iraqi politician

- مثال جمال حسين أحمد الآلوسي
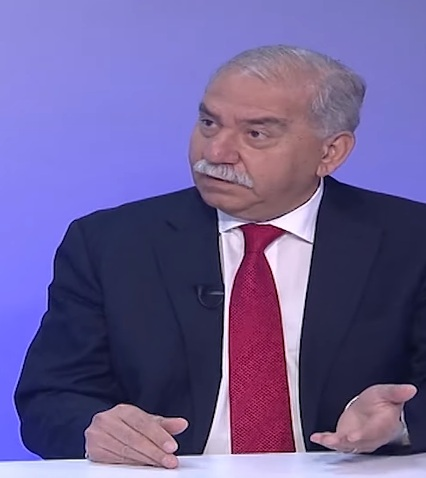

Member of Parliament for Baghdad
- In office 15 December 2005 – 7 March 2010

Head of the Supreme National De-Baathification Commission
- In office 4 November 2003 – September 2004

Personal details
- Born: May 23, 1953 (age 73) Alus, Haditha, Al Anbar Governorate, Kingdom of Iraq
- Party: Iraqi Ummah Party (2004–present)
- Other political affiliations: Iraqi National Congress (2003 – September 2004); Arab Socialist Ba'ath Party – Iraq Region (until 1976)

Mithal Jamal Hussein Ahmad al-Alusi (Arabic: مثال جمال حسين أحمد الآلوسي; born 23 May 1953) is an Iraqi politician and the leader of the Iraqi Ummah Party. He was elected to the Iraqi Council of Representatives as an independent in the December 2005 election and was once again elected in the 2014 Iraqi parliamentary election as part of the Civil Democratic Alliance which is an Iraqi political coalition formed by various liberal and civil figures and his party one seat, represented by himself. He arrived in fifth place in Baghdad out of seventy-one seats. He is a Sunni Muslim Arab politician and supports a close alliance with the United States of America, the United Kingdom, Turkey and Israel.

== Early life ==
Alusi was born on 23 May 1953 in Alus, a small village near Haditha, in Al Anbar Governorate. Al-Alusi hails from a very prominent Iraqi Sunni family from Anbar, and his father was a renowned scholar and Baghdad University professor of Classical Arabic literature.

== Life in exile ==
In 1976, he was sentenced to death in absentia while studying in Cairo for trying to undermine Saddam Hussein. Alusi was then a member of the Ba'ath Party, but had been aligned with opponents of Hussein within the party such as Abdel-Khaliq Al-Samara'i, who was himself killed by the security services. Alusi went into exile in Germany and worked as a businessman. In December 2002, he was involved in the takeover of the Iraqi embassy in Berlin to protest Hussein's tyranny, and was convicted of hostage taking by a German court and sentenced to three years in jail. His sentence was later reduced to house arrest. He returned to Iraq in October 2003 and joined the Iraqi National Congress.

== Return to Iraq ==
After the invasion of Iraq, Alusi was appointed the General Director of Culture and Media at the Supreme National De-Baathification Commission.

In September 2004, after making a public visit to Israel, al-Alusi was expelled from the Iraqi National Congress and sacked from his job at the De-Baathification Commission. He was indicted by the Central Criminal Court of Iraq for "having contacts with enemy states", a crime under a 1969 Baathist law. He was subsequently released after Iraq's Federal Supreme Court, Iraq's highest court, ruled in his favour on 24 November 2008, stating it was no longer a crime to travel to Israel, and that Iraqis could travel to wherever they wanted.

This led him to establish the Democratic Party of the Iraqi Nation, which ran in the January 2005 election. It received only 4,500 votes, far from enough to gain a seat in the Council of Representatives. However, his list won 36,000 votes, enough to obtain one seat for Baghdad Province, in the December 2005 election.

On February 19, 2005, Al-Alusi's car was ambushed by armed assailants in the Hayy Al-Jami'a neighborhood of Baghdad. His two sons Ayman, 29, and Jamal, 24, were killed in the attack, as well as one of his bodyguards. The American Jewish Committee gave him a "Moral Courage" award in response. Then Culture Minister, Asaad al-Hashimi, was convicted in absentia of the killings.

In September 2008, he again visited Israel and spoke at a conference on counter-terrorism organised by the IDC, a private college in Herzliya. He praised Israel, saying "In Israel, there is no occupation, there is liberalism" and criticised Iran, saying it was continually meddling in Iraq. He called for intelligence sharing between Iraq, Israel, the United States, Jordan, Turkey, and Kuwait. When he returned, the National Assembly of Iraq voted to remove his parliamentary immunity and ban him from travelling. The Minister for Parliamentary Affairs, Safaaeddine al-Safi, said he would seek a prosecution for "visiting a country that Iraq considers an enemy". Such a crime can carry the death penalty. Alusi appealed to the Supreme Federal Court which overturned the lifting of his immunity, ruling that it was unconstitutional as no crime had been committed.

In a series of interviews from September to December 2009 he stated that "We are receiving information which says Iran is so close to producing an atom bomb" and that "the international community, don't realize how close [the Iranians] are to the goal". However, al-Alusi, asked whether his sources are members of the Iranian government, or Iranian nuclear scientists, said that he could not be more specific, but that they are "people who are part of the system in Iran." He further stated, that a military operation is the best solution to face the Iranians and that an attack should better happen sooner than late.

After the 2010 Iraqi parliamentary elections, the Mithal al-Alusi List which had won one seat during the December 2005 elections for Mithal al-Alusi himself, claimed the elections were rigged against liberals like himself, by Iran and Saudi Arabia as he lost his seat in parliament. Alusi claimed there were major discrepancies between the vote count according to the IHEC and his own monitors. He also claimed village directors prevented women from voting in rural areas. He called on the United States to launch an investigation to the allegedly fixed election results.

A recount of the votes in Baghdad was ordered by the Supreme Court on 19 April 2010. The recount began on 3 May 2010. On 14 May IHEC announced that after 11,298 ballot boxes had been recounted, there was no sign of fraud or violations. The Supreme Court later ratified the results and as a result Mithal al-Alusi lost his seat.

In August 2012 he received a letter informing him that he was to be dispossessed of his home in the Baghdad Green Zone, so that the house could go to the Minister of Environmental Affairs.

== 2014 parliamentary election ==
The party participated in the April 2014 Iraqi parliamentary election, as part of the Civil Democratic Alliance which is an Iraqi political coalition formed by various liberal and civil figures. The party won one of the three seats of the coalition in Baghdad Governorate and is represented by its leader Mithal Al-Alusi who gained 30,054 votes, arriving fifth out of seventy one winning candidates in Baghdad. The other two seats are represented by the leader of the People's Party Faiq Al Sheikh Ali, and Shirouk Al Abayachi.
