= Abbas al-Bayati =

Iraqi politician

Natik Abbas Hasan al-Bayati is an Iraqi Shiite Turkmen politician and a member of the Iraqi National Assembly. He is a member of the State of Law Coalition, and was exiled from Iraq under Saddam Hussein and became the Secretary General of the Islamic Union of Iraqi Turkoman.

Natik al-Bayati was appointed to the "Follow-Up and Arrangement Committee" of the Iraqi opposition following a conference in London in 2002, and was a member of the committee that drafted the Constitution of Iraq and the current committee considering amendments to the constitution.
