= Shatha al-Musawi =

Iraqi politician

Shatha Mousa Sadiq al-Musawi (Arabic: شذى موسى صادق الموسوي) was elected to Iraq's transitional National Assembly in January 2005 and to the Council of Representatives in December 2005, as a candidate for the United Iraqi Alliance.

== Bibliography ==
- Cave, Damien (31 August 2007). "Shiite's Tale: How Gulf With Sunnis Widened". The New York Times.
- Enloe, Cynthia H. (2010). Nimo's War, Emma's War: Making Feminist Sense of the Iraq War. University of California Press. ISBN 978-0-520-26077-1.
- Muttitt, Greg (21 April 2011). Fuel on the Fire: Oil and Politics in Occupied Iraq. Random House. ISBN 978-1-4090-2921-2.
- Petersen, Roger D. (30 September 2011). Western Intervention in the Balkans: The Strategic Use of Emotion in Conflict. Cambridge University Press. ISBN 978-1-139-50330-3.
