= Basemah al-Shater =

- Born: 1959; Damascus
- Died: 13 March 2023 (aged 64)
- Military career
- Allegiance: Ba'athist Syria
- Branch: Ministry of Interior
- Rank: Major-General

Major-General Basemah (Basma) al-Shater (1959 – 13 March 2023) is a Syrian army officer and Director of Medical Services in the Ministry of Interior.
