= Qassim Daoud =

Iraqi scientist and politician

' Kassim Abbas Daoud ' (born April 13, 1949) is an Iraqi scientist and politician. Born in Al Hillah, he graduated from Baghdad University in 1971. He then studied in Britain, earning a doctorate in microbiology and environment in 1982 from the University of Wales. He worked in the United Arab Emirates and was once the general secretary of the Iraqi Democratic Movement.

Daoud became a minister of state without portfolio in the Iraqi Interim Government in June 2004. In September 2004, he replaced Muwaffaq al-Rubay'i as national security advisor for the Interim Government being the second most powerful man in Iraq and a noble known public and political figure.

He was elected to the transitional National Assembly in January 2005 and now serves in the Council of Representatives as a member of the National Iraqi Alliance(NIA). As a member of the NIA, Daoud established the Solidarity Bloc (Tadamun) party in 2006, which consisted of independent MPs and former members of the 2004 Iraqi Interim Government. In the 2010 Iraqi parliamentary election, Daoud ran as the leader of the Solidarity Bloc under the NIA, and the Alliance won 70 seats collectively in Parliament. He was a member of the committee that drafted the Constitution of Iraq.

Daoud is married and has three children.
