= Sami al-Askari =

Iraqi politician

Sami al-Askari (Arabic: سامي العسكري) is an Iraqi politician and member of the Iraqi National Assembly, elected from the State of Law political coalition During the regime of Saddam Hussein he was active in exile opposition politics, joining the 1992 Executive Council of the Iraqi National Congress as a representative of the Islamic Dawa Party. In 2003, al-Askari joined the Iraqi Reconstruction and Development Council (IRDC) led by Emad Dhia and worked for Coalition Provisional Authority (CPA) Central Baghdad office as Media Spokesman. He was a member of the committee that drafted the Constitution of Iraq. In 2009, al-Askari was involved in the handover of British hostage Peter Moore to the Iraqi government authorities. Moore was later returned to the UK.

In December 2013, al-Askari announced he was splitting from the State of Law and forming his own coalition that "to reach out to disaffected voters whom [Prime Minister Nouri al-] Maliki, with his roots in Shiite religious politics could not, such as the secular, women and the young."
