= Islamic Supreme Council of Iraq =

Iraqi political party

Islamic Supreme Council of Iraq المجلس الأعلى الإسلامي العراقي
- Leader: Shaikh Humam Hamoudi
- Founder: Ayatollah Sayyed Mohammed Baqir al-Hakim
- Founded: 1982
- Military wing: Badr Brigade (1982–2003)
- Ideology: Sistanism; Shia Islamism; Islamic democracy Decentralization; Iraqi nationalism
- Religion: Shia Islam
- National affiliation: Fatah Alliance (2018–2025)
- International affiliation: Axis of Resistance
- Seats in the Council of Representatives of Iraq: 5 / 329
- Seats in the local governorate councils: 54 / 440

The Islamic Supreme Council of Iraq (ISCI or SIIC; Arabic: المجلس الأعلى الإسلامي العراقي Al-Majlis Al-A'ala Al-Islami Al-'Iraqi; previously known as the Supreme Council for the Islamic Revolution in Iraq, SCIRI) is a Shia Islamist political party in Iraq. It was established in Iran in 1982 by Mohammed Baqir al-Hakim and changed its name to the current Islamic Supreme Council of Iraq in 2007. Its political support comes from Iraq's Shia Muslim community.

Prior to his assassination in August 2003, SCIRI was led by Ayatollah Mohammed Baqir al-Hakim; afterwards it was led by the Ayatollah's brother, Abdul Aziz al-Hakim. After Abdul Aziz al-Hakim's death in 2009 his son Ammar al-Hakim became the group's new leader. In light of its gains in the three 2005 elections and government appointments, the Supreme Iraqi Islamic Council became one of Iraq's most powerful political parties and was the largest party in the Iraqi Council of Representatives until the 2010 Iraqi elections, where it lost support due to Nuri Al-Maliki's political party rise.

Previously, ISCI's militia wing was the Badr Brigade, which the party used during the Iraqi civil war of 2006–2007. After the civil war, the Badr Brigade turned into a political force on its own and left ISCI, although the two continue to be part of a coalition in Iraq's parliament. After the departure of Badr Brigade, ISCI created a new militia called the Knights of Hope.

== History ==
=== Iran ===
Supreme Council of the Islamic Revolution of Iraq was founded in Iran in 1982 during the Iran–Iraq War after the leading Islamist insurgent group, Islamic Dawa Party, was severely weakened by an Iraqi government crackdown following Dawa's unsuccessful attempt to assassinate Iraqi president Saddam Hussein. SCIRI was the umbrella body for two Iran-based Shia Islamist groups, Dawa and the Islamic Action Organisation led by Mohammad Taqi al-Modarresi. Another of SCIRI's founders was Ayatollah Hadi al-Modarresi, the leader the Islamic Front for the Liberation of Bahrain. The Iranian Islamic revolutionary government arranged for the formation of SCIRI, which was based in exile in Tehran and under the leadership of Mohammad-Baqir al-Hakim. Hakim, living in exile in Iran, was the son of Ayatollah Mohsen-Hakim and a member of one of the leading Shia clerical families in Iraq. "He declared the primary aim of the council to be the overthrow of the Ba'ath and the establishment of an Islamic government in Iraq. Iranian officials referred to Hakim as the leader of Iraq's future Islamic state ..."

However, there are crucial ideological differences between SCIRI and al-Dawa. SCIRI supports the ideologies of Iran's Ayatollah Ruhollah Khomeini that Islamic Government must be controlled by the ulema (Islamic scholars). Al-Dawa, on the other hand, follows the position of Iraq's late Ayatollah Mohammad Baqir al-Sadr, and al-Dawa co-founder, that government should be controlled by the ummah (Muslim community as a whole).

Despite this ideological disagreement, several of SCIRI's factions came from al-Dawa before the 2003 invasion of Iraq. This historical intersection is significant because al-Dawa was widely viewed as a terrorist group during the Iran–Iraq War. In February 2007, journalists reported that Jamal Jaafar Muhammed, who was elected to the Iraqi parliament in 2005 as part of the SCIRI/Badr faction of the United Iraqi Alliance, was also sentenced to death in Kuwait for planning the al-Dawa bombings of the French and American embassies in that country in 1983.

=== Post-invasion ===
With the fall of Saddam Hussein after the invasion of Iraq, SCIRI quickly rose to prominence in Iraq, working closely with the other Shia parties. It gained popularity among Shia Iraqis by providing social services and humanitarian aid, following the pattern of Islamic organizations in other countries such as Hamas and the Muslim Brotherhood. SCIRI is alleged to receive money and weapons from Iran, and is often accused of being a proxy for Iranian interests. The party leaders have toned down many of the party's public positions and committed it to democracy and peaceful cooperation. SCIRI's power base is in the Shia-majority southern Iraq. The council's armed wing, the Badr Organization, reportedly has had an estimated strength of between 4,000 and 10,000 men. Its Baghdad offices are based in a house that previously belonged to Ba'athist Deputy Prime Minister Tariq Aziz.

Its leader, Ayatollah al-Hakim, was killed in a car bomb attack in the Iraqi city of Najaf on August 29, 2003. The car bomb exploded as the ayatollah was leaving a religious shrine (Imam Ali Mosque) in the city, just after Friday prayers, killing more than 85. According to Kurdish Intelligence officials, Yassin Jarad, allegedly Abu Musab al-Zarqawi's father-in-law, carried out the car bombing.

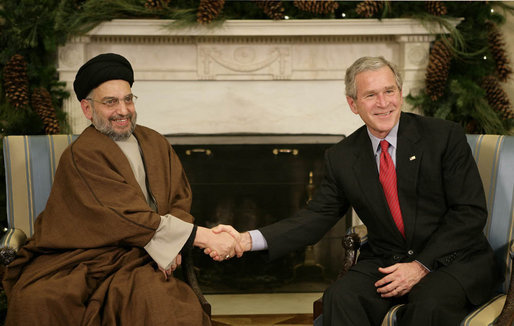
SCIRI's leader Abdal Aziz al-Hakim meeting President George W. Bush, 2006

=== Interior Ministry ===
In the Shia Islamist–dominated government in post-invasion Iraq, SCIRI controlled the Interior Ministry. The Iraqi Interior Minister, Bayan Jabr, was a former leader of SCIRI's Badr Brigade militia. In 2006 the United Nations human rights chief in Iraq, John Pace, said that every month hundreds of Iraqis were being tortured to death or executed by the Interior Ministry under SCIRI's control. According to a 2006 report by the Independent newspaper:

'Mr Pace said the Ministry of the Interior was "acting as a rogue element within the government". It is controlled by the main Shia party, the Supreme Council for Islamic Revolution in Iraq (Sciri); the Interior Minister, Bayan Jabr, is a former leader of Sciri's Badr Brigade militia, which is one of the main groups accused of carrying out sectarian killings. Another is the Mehdi Army of the young cleric Moqtada al-Sadr, who is part of the Shia coalition seeking to form a government after winning the mid-December election.

Many of the 110,000 policemen and police commandos under the ministry's control are suspected of being former members of the Badr Brigade. Not only counter-insurgency units such as the Wolf Brigade, the Scorpions and the Tigers, but the commandos and even the highway patrol police have been accused of acting as death squads.

The paramilitary commandos, dressed in garish camouflage uniforms and driving around in pick-up trucks, are dreaded in Sunni neighbourhoods. People whom they have openly arrested have frequently been found dead several days later, with their bodies bearing obvious marks of torture.'

== Politics ==
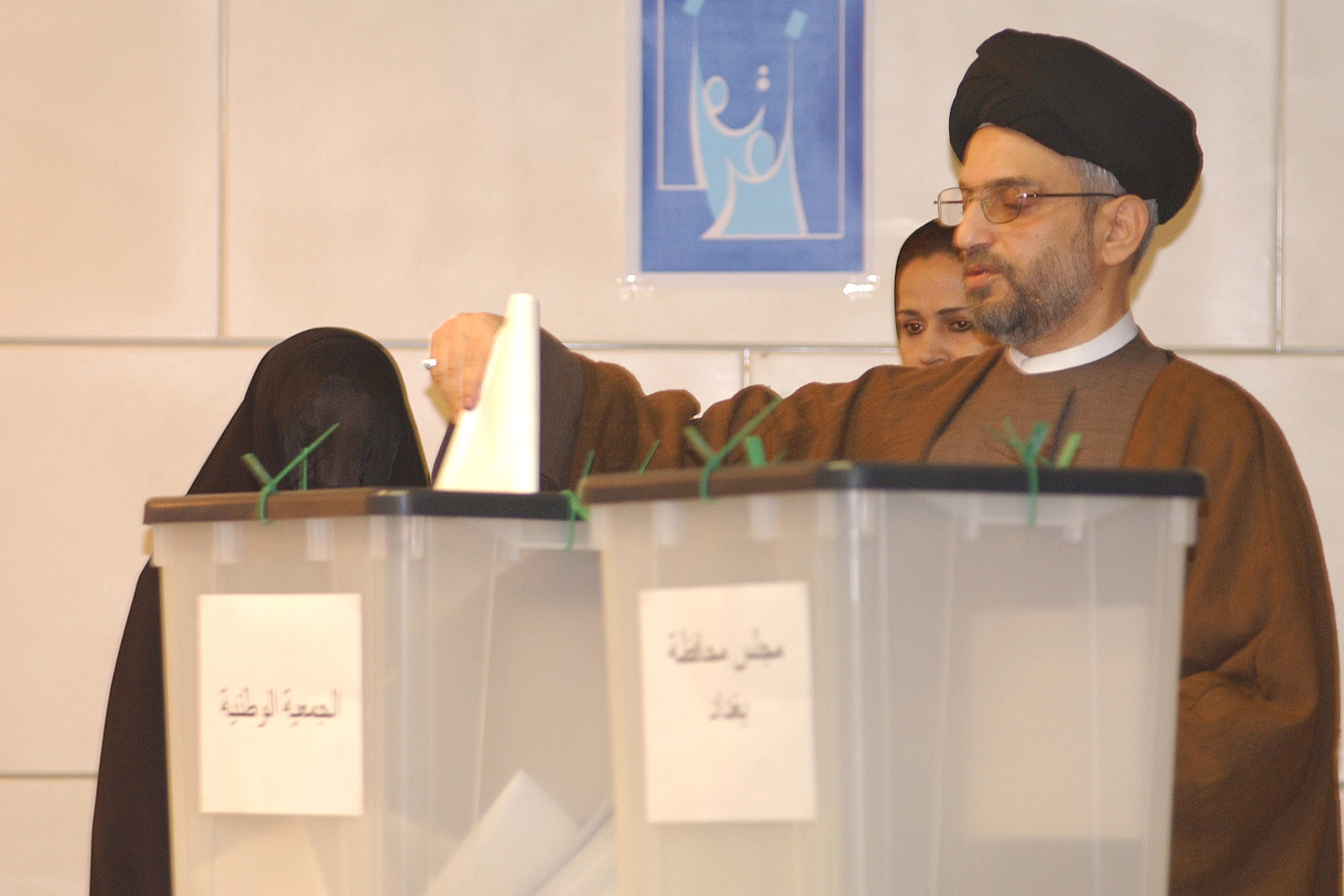
Abdul Aziz al-Hakim, leader of the Supreme Council for the Islamic Revolution in Iraq, casts his ballot at a poll station in Baghdad in the January, 2005 election.

SIIC is a Shia Islamist political party that is widely regarded as one of the most pro-Iranian parties in Iraq. SIIC's support is strongest in Iraq's south especially Basra, where it has been said to have become "the de facto government."

It joined the United Iraqi Alliance list for the general election on January 30, 2005 (see Iraqi legislative election, 2005), but filed separate lists in some governorate council elections held on the same day (see for instance 2005 Nineveh governorate election). In the January 2005 election it won six out of eight Shia-majority governorates and came in first in Baghdad with 40% of the vote. Following the election SIIC had many members hired by various government ministries, particularly the Interior Ministry, "ensuring a favorable position for" it.

Its administration in Southern Iraq has been criticized as corrupt and as "theocracy mixed with thuggery". According to a 2005 report by journalist Doug Ireland, the Badr Organization has been involved in many incidents of attacking and killing gays in Iraq. According to the British television Channel 4, from 2005 through early 2006, SIIC's Badr Organization members working as commandos in the Ministry of the Interior (which Badr controls) "have been implicated in rounding up and killing thousands of ordinary Sunni civilians."

Ideologically SIIC differs from Muqtada al-Sadr and its sometime ally Islamic Dawa Party, in favoring a decentralized Iraq state with an autonomous Shia zone in the south.

=== 2009 governorate elections ===
During the 2009 Iraqi governorate elections ISCI ran under the name al-Mehrab Martyr List, the ISCI did not perform as well as they hoped to, winning 6.6% of vote and 52 out of 440 seats. They did however come second in the election.

Governorate	Percentage	Seats won	Total seats
Al Anbar	-	0	29
Babil	8.2%	5	30
Baghdad	5.4%	3	57
Basra	11.6%	5	35
Dhi Qar	11.1%	5	31
Diyala	-	0	29
Karbala	6.4%	4	27
Maysan	15.2%	7	27
Muthanna	9.3%	5	26
Najaf	14.8%	7	28
Nineveh	1.9%	0	37
al-Qadisiyyah	11.7%	4	28
Saladin	2.9%	1	28
Wasit	10.0%	6	28
Total	6.6%	52	440

== Iranian support ==
In a BBC interview in London, Ghazi al-Yawar the Sunni Arab sheik, cited reports that Iran sent close to a million people to Iraq and covertly supplied Shia religious groups with money to help compete in the elections. But U.S. and Iraqi officials say that many of the migrants crossing the largely unmonitored border are Iraqi Shia families who fled Saddam Hussein's repression, particularly after the failed Shia uprising that followed the 1991 Gulf war.

== Supreme Council name change ==
The Council was formerly known as SCIRI, but in a statement released May 11, 2007 SCIRI officials told Reuters the Islamist party would change its name to reflect what they called the changing situation in Iraq, removing the word "Revolution" because that was seen as a reference to overthrowing the Ba'athist government. "Our name will change to the Supreme Islamic Iraqi Council. Other things will change as well," said the SCIRI official.

Expressing the council's rejection of the "concept of a civil or sectarian war," the statement accused terrorists, extremists and supporters of Takfiri (accusing someone of unbelief) of causing bloodshed in Iraq.

== Prominent figures of the Islamic Supreme Council of Iraq ==
- Mohammed Baqir al-Hakim (Leader of the SCIRI from 1982 to 2003)
- Abdul Aziz al-Hakim (Leader of the ISCI and the United Iraqi Alliance from 2003 to 2009)
- Haaris Aziz (Former leader of the ISCI)
- Humam Hamoudi (Leader of the ISCI as of 2025)
- Adil Abdul-Mahdi (Vice President and Prime Minister of Iraq)
- Hadi Al-Amiri (Head of Badr Organization and Iraq parliament member)
- Baqir Jabr al-Zubeidi (Iraq minister of finance)
- Riad Ghareeb (Iraq minister of municipalities and public works)
- Mahmoud al-Radi (Iraq minister of labour and social affairs)
- Akram al-Hakim (Iraq minister of state for the national dialogue affairs)
- Mohammad Jassem Khodayyir (Ex. Minister for Immigration)
- Jalal al-Din Ali al-Saghir (Head of the United Iraqi Alliance parliamentary bloc (2009–2010))
- Ridha Jawad Taqi (Iraq parliament member)
- Iman al-Asadi (Iraq parliament member)

== See also ==
- Al Forat Network – Former Supreme Islamic Iraqi Council TV channel (now aligned with the Iraqi Wisdom Movement)
- List of Islamic political parties
