= Iraqi Accord Front =

Iraqi Accord Front Jabhet Al-Tawafuq Al-'Iraqiyah جبهة التوافق العراقية
- Iraqi Accord Front logo
- Founded: 2005
- Ideology: Sunni Interests
- Seats in the Council of Representatives of Iraq: 0 / 328
- Seats in the local governorate councils: 0 / 440

Website
- Official website

The Iraqi Accord Front or Iraqi Accordance Front (Arabic: جبهة التوافق العراقية Jabhet Al-Tawafuq Al-'Iraqiyah) also known as Tawafuq was an Iraqi Sunni political coalition created on October 26, 2005 by the Iraqi Islamic Party to contest the December 2005 general election. As a large section of Iraq's Sunnis are composed by the populous Kurds, situated in northern Iraq and locally autonomous, the coalition's members were mostly Arab, and as such, its political efforts were largely been focused on protecting this community's interests as opposed to Iraq's non-Sunni population. In the 2005 election, its platform called for ending the US occupation of Iraq, revision of the new Iraqi constitution, repeal of the de-Ba'athification laws that had cost many Sunnis their government jobs and the restoration of the Iraqi Army, which was dissolved after the US overthrow of Saddam Hussein and which had a Sunni dominated officer corps. Despite this, the coalition maintained that it is non-secular, even though the Ba'ath Party contained many prominent Sunnis.

== Leadership ==
The Accordance Front was initially led by Adnan al-Dulaimi of the General Council for the People of Iraq. Ayad al-Samarrai replaced Adnan al-Dulaimi as leader in July 2007. In May 2009 Harith al-Obeidi was elected leader but was assassinated by terrorists weeks later.

== Membership ==
In April 2010 Taha al-Liheibi a member of the Accordance Front was injured in the Green Zone in Baghdad.

The Accordance Front withdrew from Nouri al-Maliki's government in August 2007 but rejoined in April 2008.

In December 2008 the Iraqi National Dialogue Council withdrew from the Accordance Front.

== December 2005 Parliamentary Election ==
In the December 2005 parliamentary election the Accordance Front consisted of:

- Iraqi Islamic Party – led by Tariq al-Hashimi
- General Council for the People of Iraq – led by Adnan al-Dulaimi and
- Iraqi National Dialogue Council – led by Khalaf al-Ulayyan

=== Results ===
The Accordance Front received 15.1% of the vote and 44 out of 275 seats, coming third overall to the United Iraqi Alliance and the Democratic Patriotic Alliance of Kurdistan.

== March 2010 Parliamentary Election ==
Prior to the 2010 Iraqi parliamentary election, a number of components left the Front to join other political coalitions. In particular:

- Vice President Tariq al-Hashemi formed the Renewal List (Tajdeed), which joined the secular Iraqiyya coalition
- Deputy Prime Minister Dr. Rafi al-Issawi formed the National Future Gathering which also joined Iraqiyya
- Khalaf al-Ulayyan joined the Unity Alliance of Iraq

The remaining Front parties were:

- Iraqi Islamic Party – now led by Osama Tawfiq al-Tikriti
- General Council for the People of Iraq – led by Khaled al-Baraa after Adnan al-Dulaimi was banned
- Turkmen Justice Party – led by Hassan Tawran
- Independent candidates, including Taiseer Mashhadani, Salim Jabbouri and Mutshar Aliawi

=== Results ===
Tawafuq's overall performance was disappointing as they dropped from Iraq's third biggest list, in 2005 with 1,840,216 (14.85%) votes to Iraq's seventh list in 2010, with 298,226 (2.59%) and from 44 (out of 275) seats in 2005 to a mere 6 (out of 325) seats in 2010. They remained the second largest list in Sunni Arab areas, after Ayad Allawi's secular al-Iraqiyya List.

| Governorate | Votes | Percentage | Seats Won | Total Seats |
|---|---|---|---|---|
| Anbar | 56,171 | 11.89% | 2 | 14 |
| Babil | 8,520 | 1.45% | 0 | 16 |
| Baghdad | 53,413 | 2.10% | 1 | 68 |
| Basra | 16,511 | 2.03% | 0 | 24 |
| Diyala | 23,463 | 4.67% | 0 | 13 |
| Kerkuk | 15,037 | 2.70% | 0 | 12 |
| Muthanna | 666 | 0.29% | 0 | 7 |
| Ninawa | 64,204 | 6.09% | 1 | 31 |
| Salah ad-Din | 60,241 | 12.32% | 2 | 12 |
| Total: | 298,226 | 2.59% | 6 | 325 |
