= December 2005 Iraqi parliamentary election =

- 15 December 2005
- All 275 seats in the Council of Representatives; 138 seats needed for a majority
Party	Leader	Vote %	Seats	+/–
UIA	Ibrahim al-Jaafari	41.19	128	−12
DPAK	Masoud Barzani	21.67	53	−22
Tawafuq	Tariq al-Hashimi	15.09	44	New
INL	Ayad Allawi	8.02	25	−15
INDF	Saleh al-Mutlaq	4.10	11	New
KIU	Salahaddin Bahaaddin	1.29	5	New
Risalyun		1.19	2	New
RLB	Misha'an al-Juburi	1.07	3	+2
ITF	Saadeddin Arkej	0.72	1	−2
Rafidain List	Yonadam Kanna	0.39	1	0
Mithal al-Alusi	Mithal al-Alusi	0.26	1	New
Yazidi Movement	Amin Farhan Jejo	0.18	1	+1
This lists parties that won seats. See the complete results below.
Most voted-for party by governorate
Prime Minister before	Prime Minister-designate
Ibrahim al-Jaafari; UIA	Nouri al-Maliki; UIA

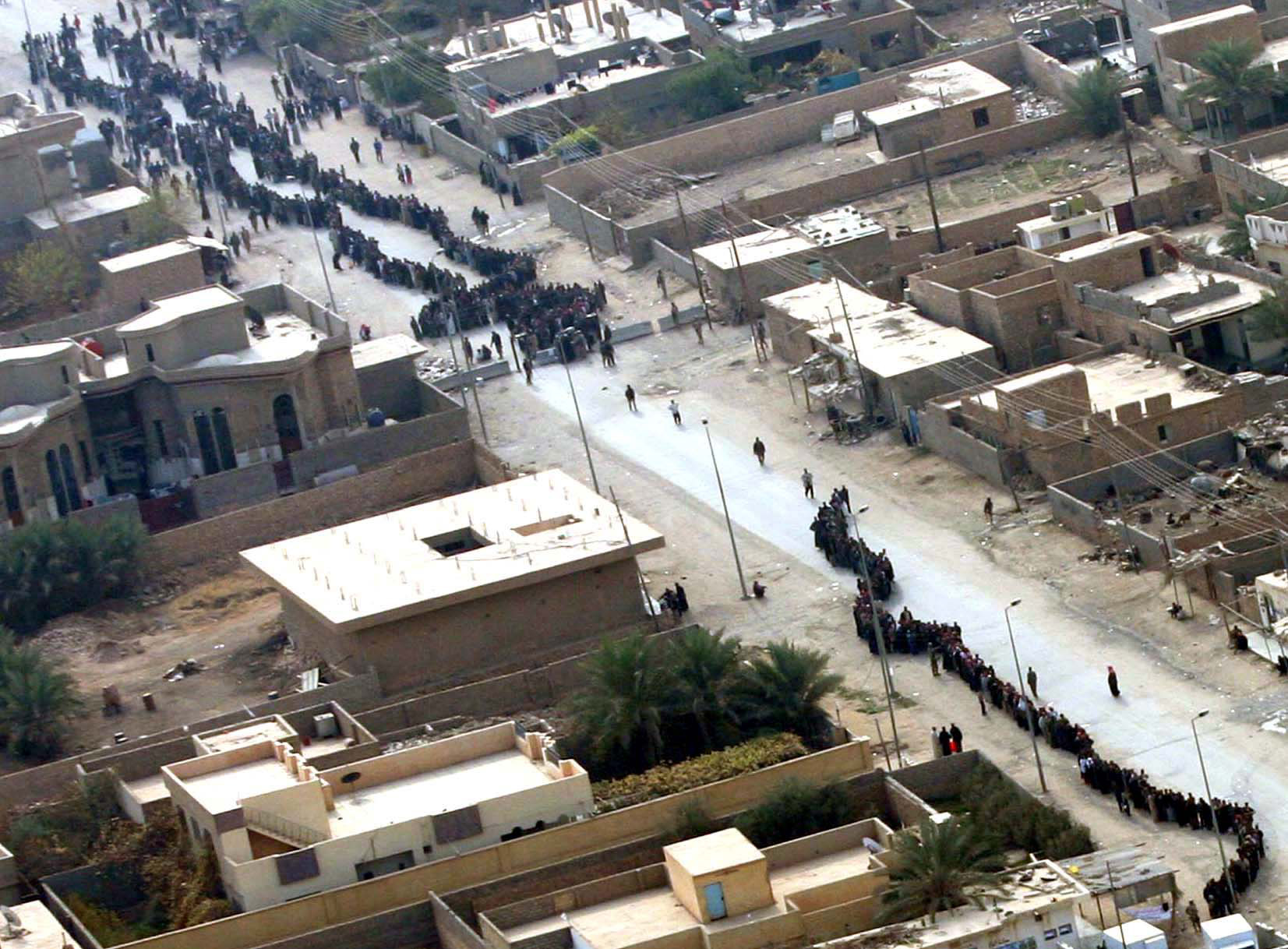
Iraqis in the predominantly Sunni city of Husaybah, wait in lines to vote, during the national election, December 15. Just a few weeks earlier, Soldiers and Marines battled insurgents in this city, located along the Syrian border.

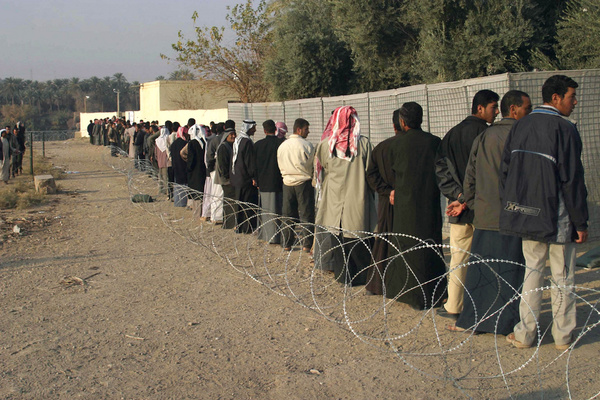
Iraqis wait in line to vote

Parliamentary elections were held in Iraq on 15 December 2005, following the approval of a new constitution in a referendum on 15 October.

== Electoral system ==
The elections took place under a list system, whereby voters chose from a list of parties and coalitions. 230 seats were apportioned among Iraq's 18 governorates based on the number of registered voters in each as of the January 2005 elections, including 59 seats for Baghdad Governorate. The seats within each governorate were allocated to lists through a system of Proportional Representation. An additional 45 "compensatory" seats were allocated to those parties whose percentage of the national vote total (including out of country votes) exceeded the percentage of the 275 total seats that they had been allocated. Women were required to occupy 25% of the 275 seats.

The change in the voting system gave more weight to Arab Sunni voters, who made up most of the voters in several provinces. It was expected that these provinces would thus return mostly Sunni Arab representatives, after most Sunnis boycotted the previous election.

== Parties and coalitions ==
The deadline for registering parties and coalitions closed on 28 October. The Electoral Commission announced that 228 lists had been registered, including 21 coalitions.

The emerging Iraqi political scene was marked by groups of established parties running on joint lists, often grouped on sectarian or ethnic grounds. These lists are not necessarily stable, as the parties sharing a list may be past or present rivals; the situation will be even more complicated for the December 2005 election because parties can form different alliances in different governorates. The landscape is currently fluid; what follows is a list of some of the more important parties and coalitions, with a focus on alliances that have shifted since the January 2005 election.

=== United Iraqi Alliance (#555) ===
This coalition, dominated by Shi'ite parties, was formed to contest the January 2005 election with the blessing of Ayatollah Ali al-Sistani, the most senior Shi'ite cleric based in Iraq. It won the most votes in that election and became the senior partner in the coalition government that ran Iraq for most of 2005. The UIA's main components were:

- The Supreme Council for the Islamic Revolution in Iraq (SCIRI) led by Abdul Aziz al-Hakim and the transitional Deputy President Adel Abdul Mahdi
- The Islamic Dawa Party led by transitional Prime Minister Ibrahim al-Jaafari
- The Iraqi National Congress of Ahmed Chalabi
- The Islamic Virtue Party, which includes the Governor of Basra, Mohammed al-Waili
- Iraqi Hezbollah, led by former Iraqi Governing Council member Sheikh Abdel-Karim Mahoud al-Mohammedawi, who led the rebellion by the Marsh Arabs against Saddam Hussein.
- A number of independent politicians, including some supporters of Moqtada al-Sadr (although other Sadr supporters formed the National Independent Cadres and Elites party).

In advance of the December 2005 elections, Moqtada al-Sadr's party chose to join the Alliance. However, the Iraqi National Congress and Iraqi Hezbollah left the Alliance to form their own lists.

In a blow to the Alliance, Ayatollah Ali al-Sistani announced that he would not back any particular party for the election; he merely encouraged people to vote "according to their beliefs." He is said to have been disappointed with the performance of the transitional government.

It was initially reported before the election that the UIA seats would be split between the parties as follows:

- Supreme Council for the Islamic Revolution in Iraq (SCIRI) - 30 places
- Moqtada al-Sadr's party - 30 places
- Islamic Dawa Party - 29 places
- Islamic Virtue Party - 14 places
- others - 15 places

Analysis of the seat allocation after the elections showed that the 109 district seats and 19 compensatory seats won by the UIA were split as follows:

- Supreme Council for the Islamic Revolution in Iraq (SCIRI) and Badr - 21 + 15
- Moqtada al-Sadr's party - 25 + 3
- Islamic Virtue Party - 14 + 1
- Islamic Dawa Party - 13
- Islamic Dawa Party - Iraq Organisation - 12
- independents and others - 24

=== The Kurdistan Alliance (#730) ===
This Kurdish-dominated coalition was formed for the January 2005 election by the two main Kurdish parties—the Kurdistan Democratic Party of Kurdistan Region President Masoud Barzani and the Patriotic Union of Kurdistan of the transitional Iraqi President Jalal Talabani—plus some other smaller parties. The DPAK formed a coalition government with the UIA in the wake of the January 2005 elections.

This coalition will also contest the December elections, but the smaller Kurdistan Islamic Union, who won 10 percent of the seats in the Dahuk and Sulaymaniyah governorate elections in January, has announced that it will form its own governmental lists.

=== Iraqi National List (#731) ===
The Iraqi List was established by Iyad Allawi, who served as interim Prime Minister before the January 2005 election. It is dominated by his Iraqi National Accord party.

For the December 2005 election, it has joined forces with former interim President Ghazi al-Yawar's The Iraqis list, the People's Union list (which is dominated by the Iraqi Communist Party), and the Sunni Arab politician Adnan Pachachi and his Assembly of Independent Democrats to form a single list called the Iraqi National List. This list will attempt to present a secular and trans-community alternative to the other major lists, which are more based on the support of a single ethnic or religious groups.

=== Iraqi Accord Front (#618) ===
The Iraqi Islamic Party originally registered for the January elections but then decided to boycott the polls, which meant that it did not gain any seats. It has decided to participate in the December elections, forming a list called the Iraqi Accord Front with two other smaller parties, the Iraqi Peoples' Gathering and the Iraqi National Dialogue. These parties aim to tap the Sunni Arab vote; Sunni Arabs overwhelmingly boycotted the January election, but increased Sunni participation in the constitutional referendum may indicate an increased Sunni turnout for the December elections, especially because more than 1,000 Sunni clerics called on their followers to vote, according to The New York Times . However, the Association of Muslim Scholars, which is influential in the Sunni community, has called for a boycott of the December elections, which could have an adverse impact on the Iraqi Accord Front's success.

=== Other lists ===
- National Peace List (#635) Led by Laith Kubba, the spokesman of at the time prime minister of Iraq, Ibrahim Al-Jaafari.
- Arabic List (#615)
- Independent Karbala Coalition (#533) - A Shi'ite group based in Karbala
- Brotherhood and Peace List (#737)
- National Congress Coalition (#569) - Made up of the Chalabi's Iraqi National Congress and some smaller groups including the monarchist Iraqi Constitutional Monarchy. Justice Minister Abdel Hussein Shandal has also joined this block. The list is mostly Shi'ite, but with some Sunnis.
- Al-Risaliyun (#631), "The Upholders of the Message" (or "Message Party" or "Progressives" in the IECI translation). This is a list of Sadrists that do not support the UIA and was backed by one of al-Sadr's collaborators, sheikh Abdul-Hadi al-Darraji.
- Yazidi Movement for Reform and Progress (#668). Yazidi minority party.
- Islamic Coalition (#549)
- Justice and Future Coalition (#517)
- Al Nahrain National List (#752) - An Assyrian list
- Al Wafaa For Basrah Gathering (#512)
- Iraqi National Dialogue Front (#667) - A mainly Sunni coalition, unlike the accord it is avowedly secular and opposed to the new constitution. It is led by Saleh al-Mutlak, who was a leader of Sunni opposition to the new constitution.
- Furation-Human Rights (#647)
- Mithal Al Aloosi List For Iraqi Nation (#620)
- Watanion Gathering (#814)
- Iraq Sun (#652)
- Al Khalas National Front (#798)
- Iraq Turkmen Front (#630)
- Unified National List (#829)
- Iraqi Free Progressive Party (#568). Its leader, Iraqi Sunni politician Mizhar Dulaimi was shot dead while campaigning in Ramadi on December 13. The previous night, he had appeared on television urging Sunnis to take part in the elections.
- Assembly of Independent Iraqis (#565) . A secular resistance-supporter list led by former electricity minister Dr. Ayham al-Samarie.

== Results ==
Party	Votes	%	Seats	+/–
United Iraqi Alliance	5,021,137	41.19	128	–12
Democratic Patriotic Alliance of Kurdistan	2,642,172	21.67	53	–22
Iraqi Accord Front	1,840,216	15.09	44	New
Iraqi National List	977,325	8.02	25	–15
Iraqi National Dialogue Front	499,963	4.10	11	New
Kurdistan Islamic Union	157,688	1.29	5	New
The Upholders of the Message	145,028	1.19	2	New
Reconciliation and Liberation Bloc	129,847	1.07	3	+2
Iraqi Turkmen Front	87,993	0.72	1	–2
Rafidain List	47,263	0.39	1	0
Mithal al-Alusi List	32,245	0.26	1	New
Yazidi Movement for Reform and Progress	21,908	0.18	1	+1
Other parties	588,348	4.83	0	–
Total	12,191,133	100.00	275	0
Valid votes	12,191,133	98.34		
Invalid/blank votes	205,498	1.66		
Total votes	12,396,631	100.00		
Registered voters/turnout	15,568,702	79.63		
Source: IPU

== Aftermath ==
=== Fraud allegations ===
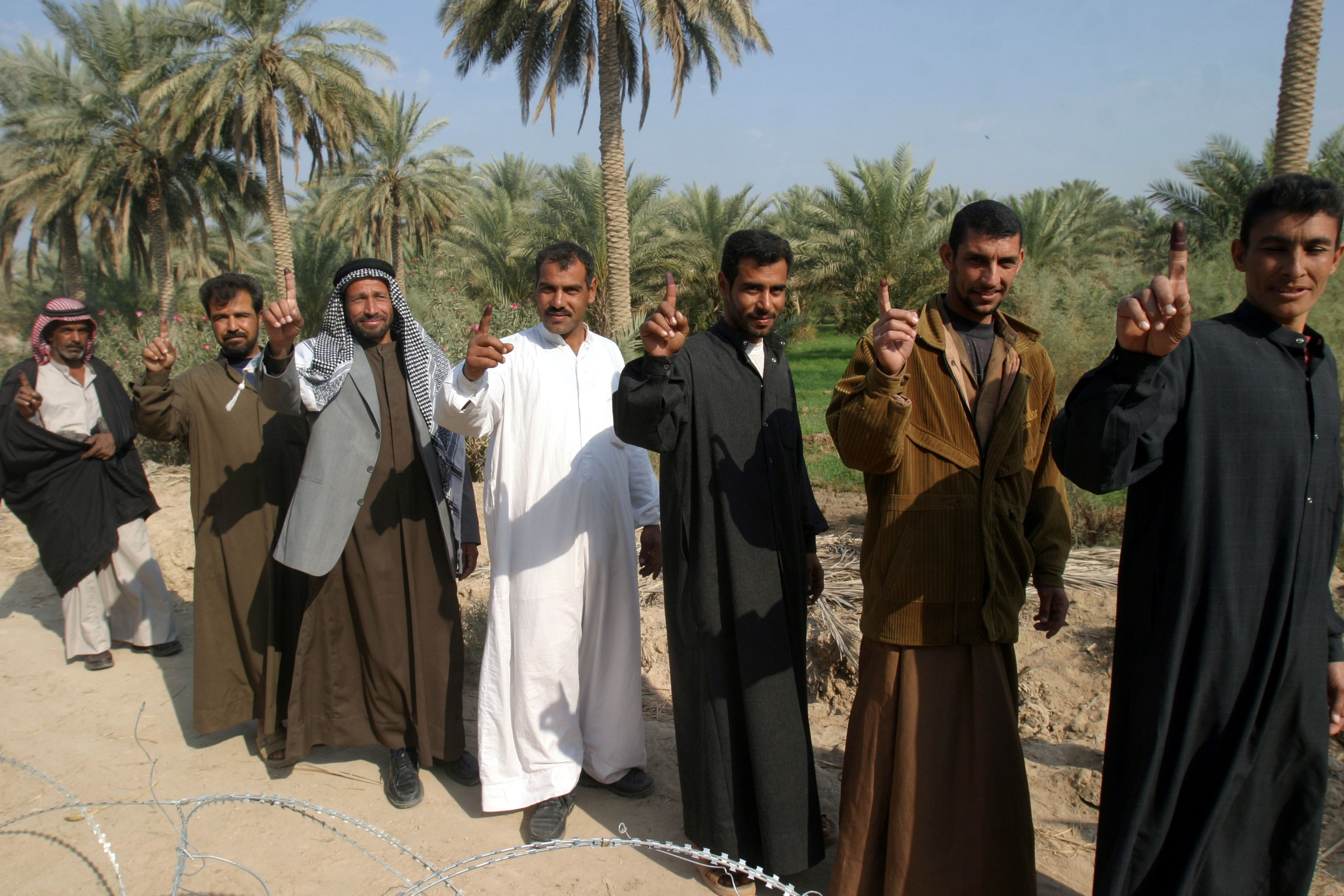
A group of Iraqi citizens walking down a path showing their purple fingers, signifying that they had voted.

On 22 December 2005, Sunni Arab and secular Shiite factions demanded that an international body review election fraud complaints, and threatened to boycott the new legislature. The United Nations rejected the idea.

Large demonstrations broke out across Iraq on 23 December to denounce the elections. Protesters said that the elections were rigged in favor of the main religious Shiite coalition. Many Iraqis outside the religious Shiite coalition allege that the elections were unfair to smaller Sunni Arab and secular Shiite groups. As many as 20,000 people demonstrated after noon prayers in southern Baghdad. Over 2,000 people demonstrated in Mosul, accusing Iran of involvement in the election.

Sheik Mahmoud al-Sumaidaei of the Association of Muslim Scholars, a major Sunni clerical group, told followers during prayers at Baghdad's Umm al-Qura mosque that they were "living a conspiracy built on lies and forgery."

Violence in Iraq increased following the election on 15 December. The president of the Students' Union of Mosul University, Qusay Salahaddin, was abducted and killed after leading a demonstration against the election results. Approximately 2,000 students gathered at the mosque where his body was transported, accusing militia forces affiliated with one of the main parties in the Shiite Alliance bloc for Salahaddin's murder. No group claimed responsibility for the killing.

=== Government formation ===
After six months of negotiations a "government of national unity" was agreed between the United Iraqi Alliance, Iraqi Accord Front, Kurdistani Alliance and Iraqi National List, under the leadership of Prime Minister Nouri al-Maliki.

== See also ==
- List of members of the Council of Representatives of Iraq, 2005–2010
