= Democratic July 14 Movement =

Coalition of Iraqi political forces opposing Ba'athist rule (1979–1981)

The Democratic July 14 Movement (Arabic: حركة ۱٤ تموز الديمقراطية, translit. harakat 14 tammuz ad-dimoqratia) was a front of Iraqi political forces, a broad unity opposing Ba'athist rule over Iraq. It emerged through the cooperation between the Iraqi Communist Party-Central Command leader Najim Mahmud (in exile in Paris), Colonel Salim al-Fakhri and others. The name 'July 14' referred to the July 14 Revolution of 1958. Al-Fakhri had been an important associate of Abd al-Karim Qasim and had been proposed as prime minister by the plotters of the failed Ar-Rashid revolt. The movement claimed to represent the genuine legacy of July 14, 1958 from which, according to the organization, Qasim and his military associates had deviated.

In November 1979 the Supreme National Committee of the Democratic July 14 Movement published a manifesto in Baghdad, titled 'A Project for a National Pact'. The manifesto called for the overthrow of the Ba'athist government, right of self-determination of the Kurds through the possibility of a referendum, democratizing the Iraqi Armed Forces, economic and eventually political integration of the Arab states and a reorientation of the national oil policy.

The Democratic July 14 Movement proved short-lived, as differences erupted between its leaders. Al-Fakhri projected himself as the main leader of the movement, in contradiction to the agreed principle of collective leadership. In July 1980 he held separate negotiations with the Patriotic Union of Kurdistan leader Jalal Talabani, for the construction of an Iraqi national front against Saddam Hussein's rule. Other constituents of the Democratic July 14 Movement questioned al-Fakhri on under what mandate these negotiations had taken place. By early 1981, the movement had broken apart and ceased to function.

== See also ==
- Al-Ansar (Iraq)
- Ba'athist Iraq
- Iraqi Communist Party
- Iraqi National Congress
