= Iraq–Russia relations =

- Iraq: Russia

Diplomatic mission
- Embassy of Iraq, Moscow: Embassy of Russia, Baghdad

Iraq–Russia relations (Russian: Российско–иракские отношения, Arabic: العلاقات الروسية العراقية) are the bilateral relations between Iraq and Russia and, prior to Russia's independence, between Iraq and the Soviet Union. The current Iraqi Ambassador to Russia is Haidar Mansour Hadi Al-Athari who has been serving his second post in Moscow since June 2024.

== History ==
Relations between Russians and the people of Iraq long predate the formation of the modern Iraqi and Russian states. In the Middle Ages, merchants and explorers travelled between the two countries using the Volga trade route and Caspian Sea, and then overland. According to Ibn Khordadbeh, already in the 9th century one could encounter Rus merchants in the markets of Baghdad, to which they brought beaver, fox pelts, and swords.

Russia sent military personnel to help the Persians during the Siege of Baghdad in 1733.

In the modern era, Soviet-Iraqi and, later, Russian-Iraqi relations have been generally part and parcel of their relations with the Third World countries and their national liberation movements, particularly Arab nationalism, which for both historical and geostrategic reasons has been especially important for Moscow. However, at the same time, particularly between 1958 and 1990, Soviet-Iraqi relations were marked by some special features, putting them in contrast with Soviet links with other Afro-Asian nations and even some states of the Arab Middle East.

- Iraq was, first of all, the closest of all the Arab nations to Soviet borders and, because of that proximity the threat of Soviet expansion, could have been seen as being much more realistic and likely by its leaders, as compared with the leaders of the other Arab states.
- Although different from the other Arab states of the Mashreq, Iraq, since its very beginning in the 1920s, contained a substantial (close to twenty-five percent) ethnic non-Arab Kurdish minority with specific constitutional rights, which were granted in 1925 as a condition for the incorporation of the largely Kurdish populated Mosul region into its borders. The Kurdish people, other groups of which live in Turkey, Iran and Russia, have never completely submitted to their division and lack of national self-determination, and have constantly demanded territorial autonomy in Iraq since 1961. Their aspirations towards which the Soviet Union could not remain indifferent, were, however, putting the nation in the awkward situation of having to make a choice between their recognition and general support of Arab nationalism and the friendly Iraqi government.
- The Iraqi Communist Party, which was formally founded in 1934, was one of the most effective and socially influential Marxist organizations in the region. Although it was never powerful enough to seize power by itself, it nevertheless represented a by-no-means negligible political force in the country, supporting Moscow after 1958, both a valuable asset and an embarrassment in its deals with the "progressive" but still often viciously anti-communist Iraqi government.
- Finally, Iraq's economic potential and relative wealth, especially after the 1973 October War and the subsequent and substantial rise of oil prices, made the state a financially attractive partner and customer for Moscow. These economic aspects, which had never been absent in the past, have acquired additional importance since the collapse of the USSR and the emergence of Russia as a separate and pro-capitalist nation.
- Within two years, Russian-Iraqi trade increased by 52 percent from $900 million to $1.4 billion as per September 2018.

Post-Soviet Russia, although having rejected Marxist ideology and the ideological support of the Communist parties and the national liberation movements of Third World peoples, is nevertheless still interested in cooperation with Iraq, and has supported Baghdad politically against the United States since 1994, including the imposing of punitive sanctions.

=== Iraq–Soviet Union relations ===
Iraq–Soviet Union relations
- Iraq: Soviet Union

The Soviet Union officially established diplomatic relations with the Kingdom of Iraq on 9 September 1944. The regime of King Faisal II was anti-communist, and established links with Moscow due to its dependence on the United Kingdom and the Anglo–Soviet Treaty of 1942. In January 1955, the Soviet government criticised the Iraqi government's decision to join the Baghdad Pact, which led to capitalist Iraq cutting diplomatic relations with the Soviets. After Faisal II was overthrown in a military coup on 14 July 1958, the newly proclaimed Republic of Iraq led by General Abd al-Karim Qasim re-established relations with the Soviet Union in March 1959, and the Soviet Union began selling arms to Baghdad. In November 1958, the Soviet Union sent a military mission to Iraq, as well as MiG-17 and Il-38 aircraft. After the 1963 Iraqi coup d'état, the new government persecuted communists, and the Soviet Union temporarily suspended arms exports until June 1964. The Soviet Union provided significant military hardware to Iraq, such as military aircraft (including MiG fighter jets), tanks, and a surface-to-air missile system), as well as aid in the form of Soviet military and civilian advisers who provided technical assistance. In 1967, Iraq signed an agreement with the USSR to supply the nation with oil, in exchange for large-scale access to Eastern Bloc arms.

The Ba'athist regime drew even closer to the Soviet Union, with relations hitting their peak from 1969 to 1973. After 1972, Iraq soon became one of the Soviet Union's closest allies in the Middle East. A fifteen-year Iraqi-Soviet "treaty of friendship and cooperation" was signed in April 1972. Iraq participated in the Yom Kippur War against Israel, and received Soviet military aid during the war. Soviets assisted the Iraqis in the development of the Rumaila oil field, and Soviet premier Alexei Kosygin participated in the ribbon-cutting ceremony. Soviet arms were also used by the Iraqis to crush the Kurdish uprising led by Mustafa Barzani, in 1975. Iraqi secret police received training from Soviet and East German agents. Ties between the two nations "weakened in the mid-1970s as Baghdad sought to mend fences with its Gulf neighbors and get access to Western technology." Moreover, Iraq's government did not share good relations with Syria, a close partner of Soviet Union and tried to improve relations with Egypt, which was moving out of the Soviet sphere of influence.

In the Iran–Iraq War, Soviet Union accounted for 32% of the arms imports of Iraq, the greatest for any country. In absolute terms, this was more than 20 billion dollars. During the Iran-Iraq war, Iraq diversified its arms sales by purchasing arms from France, China, Brazil, South Africa and the United States. Iraq sought to ensure that it could fulfill its military needs while avoiding over-reliance on the Soviet Union.

This did not mean that during all that time their mutual relations had always been equally friendly and without serious political differences. Canadian scholar Andrej Kreutz explains because of their support of the national-liberation movements, a number of important Third World countries, including Iraq, "declared their friendship for and improved relations with the USSR and sided with it on a number of international problems". In no instance, however, did their leaders "compromise their own national interests or become Soviet stooges." Baghdad's interest in cooperation with Moscow "was based on the need for a powerful patron in its efforts to shed all the remnants of Western colonialism and to establish Iraq as an autonomous member of the world order of nation states." At the same time, however, the Iraqi "ruling elite had shown stubborn resistance towards anything which could be regarded as an intrusion into the country's internal affairs or as an infringement upon Iraq's sovereignty over its international policies."

==== Iraqi occupation of Kuwait ====
The Soviet Union was critical of Saddam Hussein's 2 August 1990 occupation of Kuwait, and supported a United Nations resolution authorizing the use of military force, if necessary, to enforce an arms embargo against Iraq. But the Soviet Union's military support for Hussein also drew substantial criticism from the United States and other Western countries. In Washington, D.C., Heritage Foundation foreign policy experts Jay P. Kosminsky and Michael Johns wrote on 30 August 1990 that, "While condemning the Iraqi invasion, Gorbachev continues to assist Saddam militarily. By Moscow's own admission, in a 22 August official press conference with Red Army Colonel Valentin Ogurtsov, 193 Soviet military advisors still are training and assisting Iraq's one million-man armed forces. Privately, Pentagon sources say that between 3,000 and 4,000 Soviet military advisors may be in Iraq."

=== Present ===
Before and during the 2003 US-led invasion of Iraq, the Russian government provided intelligence to Saddam Hussein about the location of US forces and their plans. In 2009, Russian energy companies Lukoil and Gazprom signed major oil contracts with Iraq. In 2018, Iraq received T-90 tanks from Russia. In 2020, Iraq reportedly considered the purchase of S-400 missile system from Russia but was discouraged from doing so by the prospect of incurring sanctions under CAATSA.

== See also ==
- Ar-Rashid revolt
- Foreign relations of Iraq
- Foreign relations of Russia
- Soviet Union and the Iran–Iraq War
- List of ambassadors of Russia to Iraq
- Scheherazade
