= Iraqi opposition (pre-2003) =

Political opposition

- Dates active: 1979 – 2003
- Country: Ba'athist Iraq
- Groups: Iraqi National Congress; Kurdish groups: Kurdistan Democratic Party; Patriotic Union of Kurdistan; Kurdistan Islamic Movement; Ansar al-Islam; Shiite factions: Islamic Supreme Council of Iraq; Islamic Dawa Party; Leftist factions: Democratic July 14 Movement; pro-Syrian Ba'ath Party faction; Iraqi Communist Party; Al-Ansar; Other factions: Iraqi Constitutional Monarchy; Iraqi National Accord
- Ideology: Anti-Saddamism; Factions: Shia Islamism; Sunni Islamism; Assadism; Communism; Kurdish nationalism
- Political position: Big tent
- Wars: 1991 Iraqi uprisings

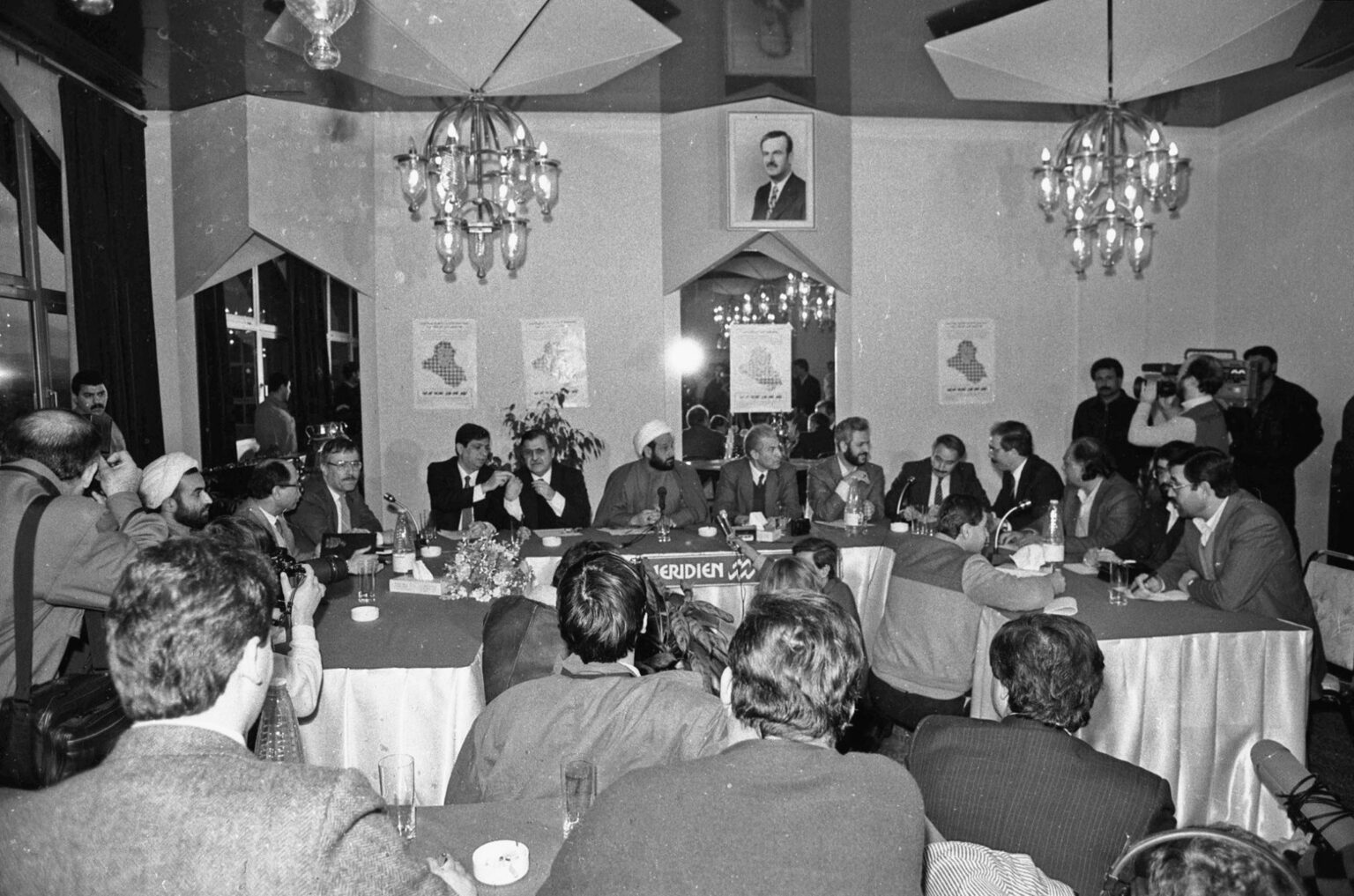
Iraqi opposition press conference in Damascus, Syria, 1991

The Iraqi opposition (Arabic: المعارضة العراقية, romanized: Muʻaraḍatu l-‘Irāqiyyah) was a large political and militant structure represented by a diverse de facto coalition with the common goal of overthrowing Saddam Hussein.

== Structure ==
In the south of Iraq, the opposition was dominated by Shia Arabs, while in the north, it was dominated by Kurds, mostly Sunni. In Baghdad, there were many Arab opposition groups. Large groups included the Iraqi National Congress, Kurdish groups such as KDP, PUK, IMK, AAI, as well as the Iraqi Constitutional Monarchy which aimed at restoring the Kingdom of Iraq, and the Iraqi National Accord, and the Iran-backed Shia groups such as the Islamic Supreme Council of Iraq and Islamic Dawa Party. Other groups included the Democratic July 14 Movement coalition, pro-Assad Ba'athists, and the Iraqi Communist Party and its military wing Al-Ansar.

In February 2003, the Bush administration fell out with the Iraqi opposition, its closest ally.

=== Groups ===
In a summary, they can be roughly divided into three categories:

- Shi'a groups in the south
- Kurds in the north, organizing in Iraqi Kurdistan since 1991
- Arab opposition groups suppressed in Baghdad

Groups include:

- the umbrella group Iraqi National Congress
- Four main Kurdish factions:
  - Kurdistan Democratic Party
  - Patriotic Union of Kurdistan
  - Kurdistan Islamic Movement
  - Ansar al-Islam in Kurdistan
- the monarchist group Iraqi Constitutional Monarchy
- the Iraqi National Accord
- the Iran-supported Iraqi Shi'a groups Islamic Supreme Council of Iraq and Islamic Dawa Party
- Democratic July 14 Movement
- the pro-Syrian faction of the Arab Socialist Ba'ath Party
- the Iraqi Communist Party
