= Pasht Ashan massacre =

1983 massacre of Iraqi Communist Party members

- Part of the prelude to the 1983-1986 Kurdish rebellions in Iraq
- Location: Pasht Ashan, Sulaymaniyah Governorate
- Date: May 1983
- Target: Iraqi Communist Party and Al-Ansar
- Deaths: Over 150
- Perpetrator: Patriotic Union of Kurdistan

The Pasht Ashan massacre (Arabic: مجزرة بشتآشان, Sorani Kurdish: کارەساتی پشت ئاشان) was a raid on the Iraqi Communist Party headquarters in Pasht Ashan, Iraqi Kurdistan, in which the Patriotic Union of Kurdistan killed over 150 members of the group and severely weakened it.

== Massacre ==
The Iraqi Communist Party made a deal with the Patriotic Union of Kurdistan (PUK), one of the two main Kurdish factions. However, two weeks later, the Iraqi Communist Party shifted its alliance to the arch-rival of PUK, the Kurdistan Democratic Party (KDP). This shift of alliance was caused by the PUK's willingness to make a peace agreement with Saddam Hussein. As a result, Al-Ansar was put in the line of fire between the two warring Kurdish parties. In May 1983, al-Ansar forces entered the Pasht Ashan area, a zone that both PUK and KDP claimed. PUK forces raided the Iraqi Communist Party headquarters in Pasht Ashan, and massacred 150 al-Ansar fighters and Iraqi Communist Party members. The radio station run by the Iraqi Communist Party in the area was destroyed by the PUK, which also seized ammunitions and food supplies. Several Iraqi Communist Party members, including members of the party politburo, were captured by the PUK. This massacre severely weakened al-Ansar as an effective guerrilla force.

Nawshirwan Mustafa, an organizer of the massacre, allowed the Kurdish prisoners to join the PUK, although the Arabs, Assyrians, and Turkomans were executed. It was also alleged that captured women were raped.

Within the Iraqi Communist Party – Central Command (a group which broke off from the Iraqi Communist Party because they had opposed the alliance between the Iraqi Communist Party and Saddam Hussein's Ba'ath Party), claims were made that the Pasht Ashan massacre had been deliberately provoked by the Iraqi Communist Party leadership, who allegedly used the killings to remove opposition from within the party who called for the holding of a new party congress, although the claim is weak.
