= Al-Ansar (Iraq) =

Iraqi Communist guerrilla group

- الأنصار
- Leader: Toma Tomas
- Dates active: 1979–1988
- Headquarters: Kirkuk; Sulaymaniyah; Aden (South Yemen)
- Active regions: Iraqi Kurdistan
- Ideology: Communism; Marxism
- Political position: Left-wing
- Size: 10,000?
- Part of: Kurdish faction of the Iraqi Communist Party

Al-Ansar (Arabic: الأنصار, Sorani Kurdish: ئەل ئەنسار 'the Partisans') was a paramilitary wing part of the Iraqi Communist Party’s Kurdish faction, active between 1979 and 1988. In 1979 it began an insurgency in Iraqi Kurdistan against Ba'athist Iraq.

== Early phase ==
Al-Ansar insurgency
- Part of Iraqi–Kurdish conflict
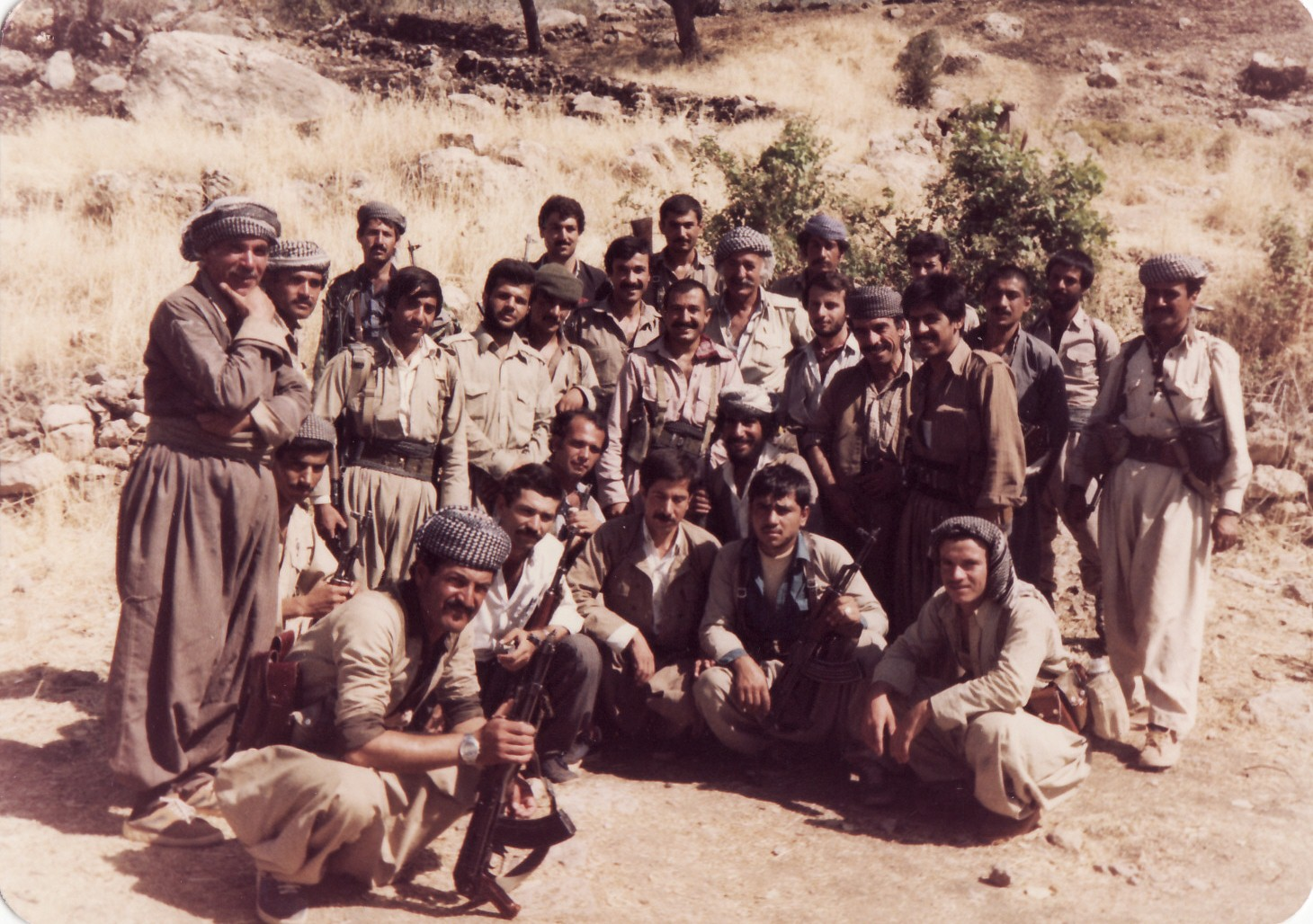
- Al-Ansar partisans in Northern Iraq
Date	1979–1988
Location	Iraqi Kurdistan, Iraq
Result	Insurgency ended

Belligerents
Ba'athist Iraq	Al-Ansar

Commanders and leaders
(Ba'athist Iraq) Saddam Hussein	Toma Tomas

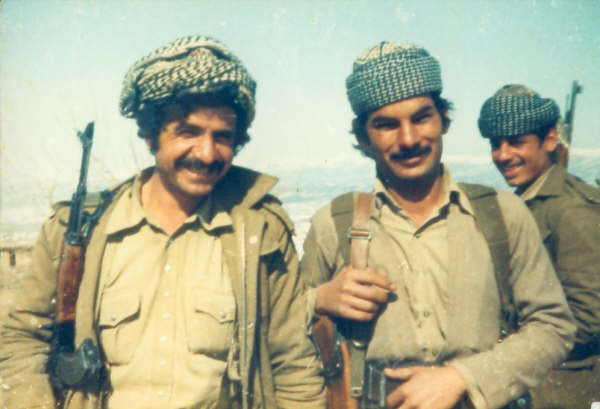
Partisans in the Sulemaniyah region

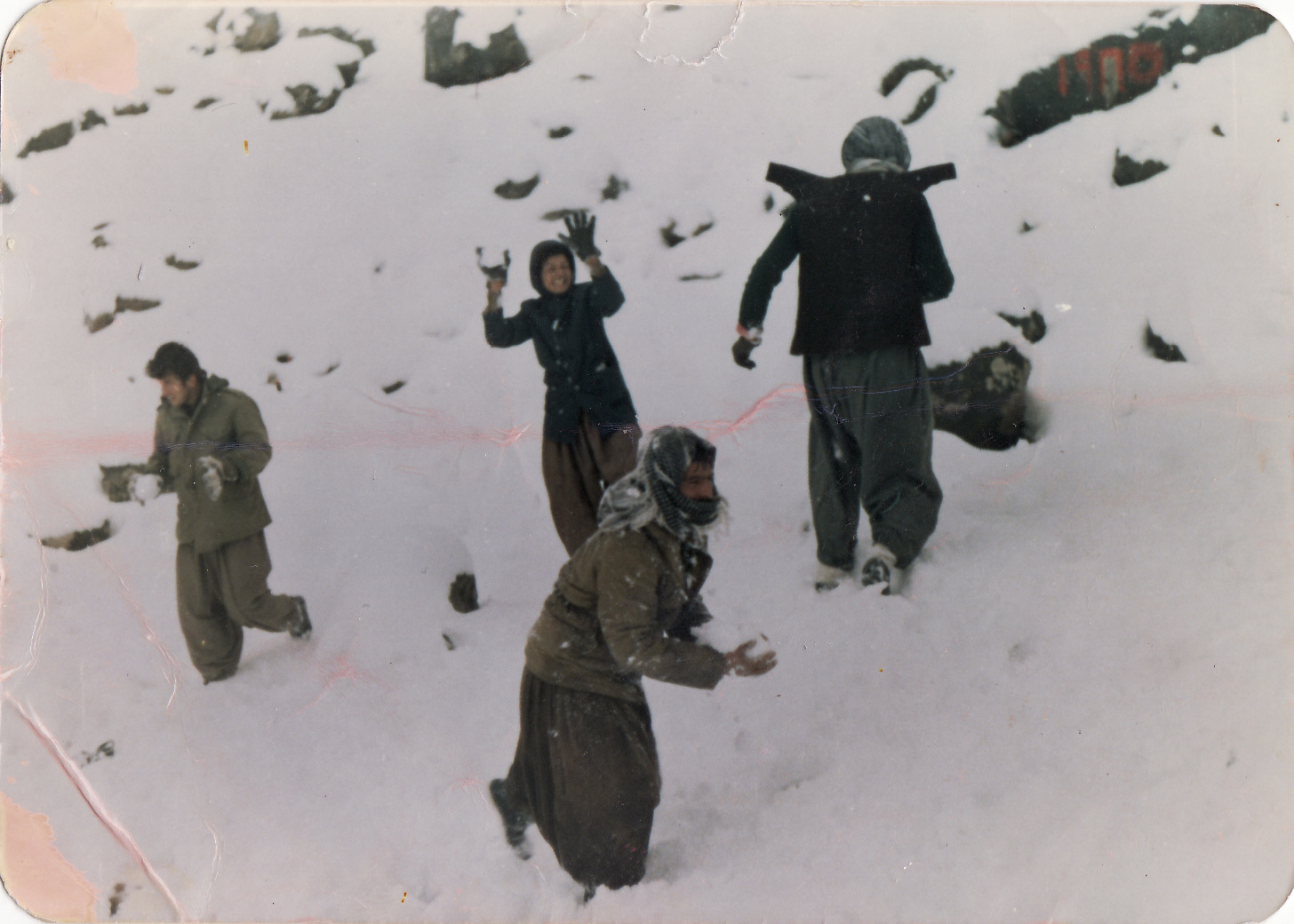
Playing in the snow

When the alliance between the Iraqi Communist Party and the Iraqi Ba'ath Party ended, a wave of harsh repression against the communists followed. In 1977 the regime launched a crackdown against the communists. A number of communist cadres fled to the Kurdish areas in northern Iraq to escape arrest. By January 1979, the exiled communists had established ansar (partisan) fighting units. By April 1979 the ansar movement was operational. Headquarters of the partisan units were established in Kirkuk and as-Sulemaniyah, and bases were established in Irbil. Later, bases were also set up in Dohuk and Nineveh. The build-up of the ansar movement did however occur without the full consent of the politburo of the party.

In South Yemen, a number of Al-Ansar began their military training before joining the guerrillas in northern Iraq. The training was administered by the South Yemeni government.

== Communist Party adopts armed struggle ==
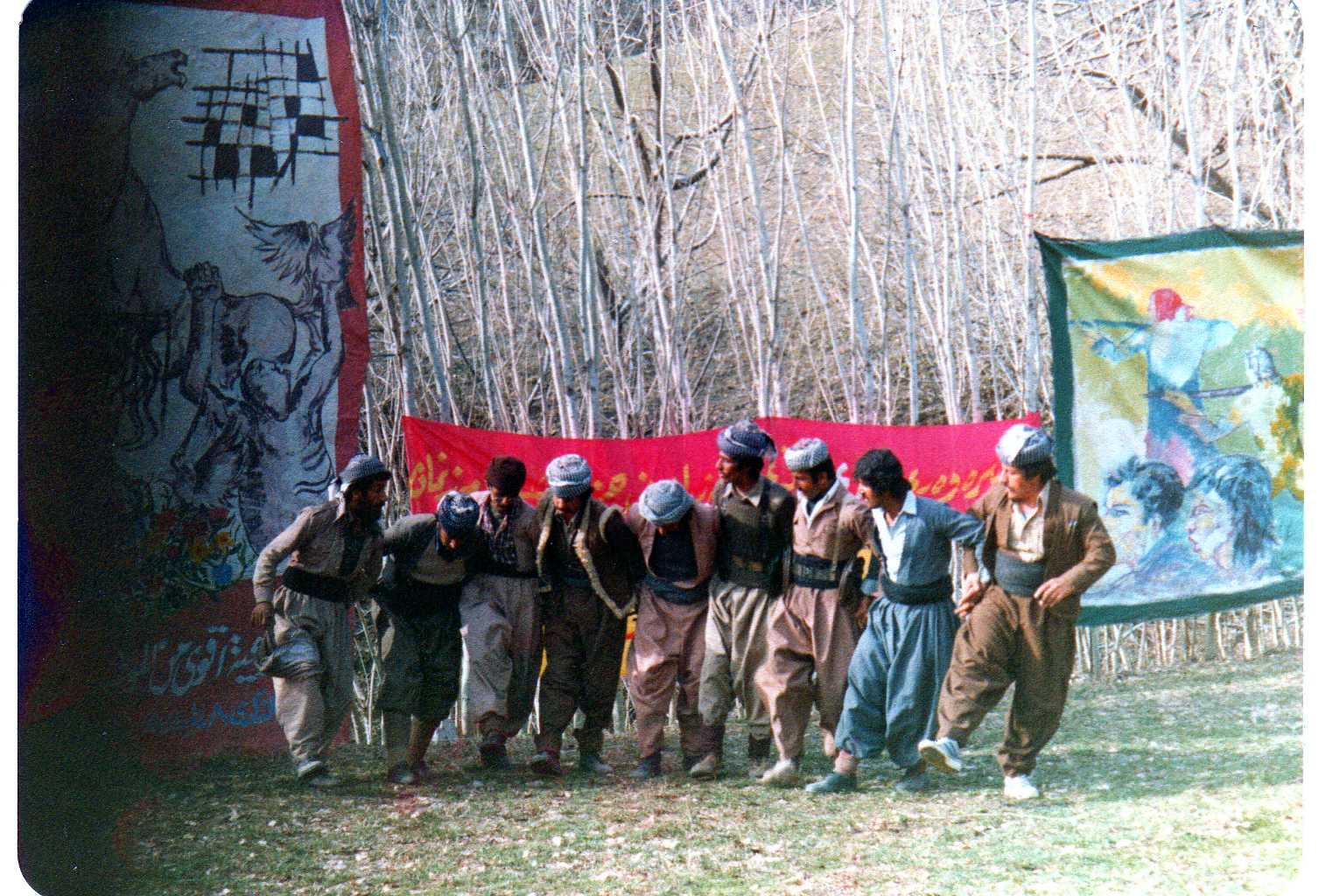
Cultural programme in the partisan camps

In 1980 partisan newspapers in Arabic, Nahj al-Ansar (نهج الأنصار, 'Path of the Partisans'), and Kurdish, Ribazy Peshmerga, were launched. In November 1981 the Communist Party formally adopted armed struggle as a line of struggle of the party and established up a Central Military Bureau as a unified command to lead the partisan movement. By that time the partisan forces operated throughout the Kurdish provinces of Iraq.

In 1982 a Central Military Council was held clandestinely. It was attended by the Communist Party general secretary, politburo and partisan commanders. The Council set up the overall strategic line of the armed struggle. By this time a decentralized command structure had been adopted, enabling the partisan forces more flexibility in their confrontations with Iraqi government troops.

== Pasht Ashan massacre ==
The Communist Party made a deal with the Patriotic Union of Kurdistan (PUK), one of the two main Kurdish factions. However, only two weeks after the deal with PUK, the Communist Party shifted its alliances to the arch-rival of PUK, the Kurdish Democratic Party (KDP). This shift of alliance was motivated by the willingness of PUK to reach an agreement with the Saddam Hussein government. The immediate result of the shift was that al-Ansar was put in the line of fire between the warring Kurdish factions. In May 1983 al-Ansar forces entered the Pasht Ashan area, a zone that both PUK and KDP claimed as part of their sphere of influence. PUK forces attacked the Communist Party headquarters, and massacred 150 al-Ansar fighters and other Communist Party members. A radio station run by the Communist Party was destroyed by the PUK peshmerga. The PUK peshmerga also seized ammunitions and food supplies of al-Ansar. Several Communist Party members, including members of the party politburo, were captured by PUK. After the attack al-Ansar was no longer en effective guerrilla force.

Within the Iraqi Communist Party-Central Command (a splinter-group that had opposed the alliance between the Iraqi Communist Party and the Baath Party), claims were made that the Pasht Ashan massacre had been deliberately provoked by the Communist Party leadership. According to this version of events, the Communist Party leadership would have used the killings to remove oppositional forces inside the party (who called for the holding of a new party congress).

== End of the movement ==
Al-Ansar ICP flag

After the Pasht Ashan massacre, in June 1987 the movement suffered another severe set-back, as another 150 fighters were killed. The report to the 1998 sixth party congress of the Iraqi Communist Party identified that confusion between the politburo and the local guerrilla forces had been the cause of the defeat.

The June–July 1987 meeting of the Central Committee of the Iraqi Communist Party decided to put al-Ansar in control of the Kurdish faction of the party after the Arab faction failed to lead it. However, by that time, al-Ansar was largely defunct. According to estimates from the Iraqi Communist Party, around 1,200 of al-Ansar were killed during nine years of armed struggle.

The Al-Ansar Medal of Honor: For outstanding deeds and for exceptional service, courage, steadfastness, and self-sacrifice displayed under circumstances of extreme danger.

== Veterans' Society ==
In 2004 an organization of veterans of the al-Ansar, Iraqi Communist Partisans Society, was founded at a conference in southern Sweden. The Society has branches both in Iraq and in exile.

== See also ==
- Ar-Rashid revolt
- Iraqi Armed Revolutionary Resistance
- Iraqi opposition (pre-2003)
- Toma Tomas
