= Toma Tomas =

Assyrian nationalist and Iraqi Communist Party member

- ܬܘ̇ܡܵܐ ܬܘ̇ܡܵܣ
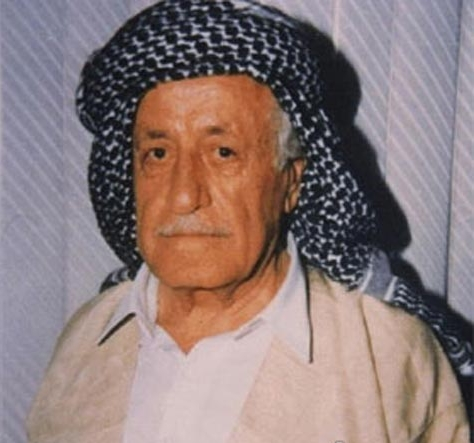
- Toma Tomas in his seventies
- Born: 1924; Alqosh, Iraq
- Died: 15 October 1996 (aged 72); Qamishli, Syria
- Other name: Abu Joseph
- Occupation: Guerilla leader
- Known for: Guerilla leader
- Political party: Iraqi Communist Party

Toma Sadiq Kakka, better known as Toma Tomas (Syriac: ܬܘ̇ܡܵܐ ܬܘ̇ܡܵܣ, Arabic: توما توماس; 1924 – 15 October 1996) and also known by his nom de guerre Abu Joseph, was an Assyrian nationalist and Iraqi communist politician. He was also the leader of al-Ansar, a Marxist–Leninist militia in Iraq which fought on behalf of the Iraqi Communist Party against the Iraqi government from the 1960s until the 1980s. The roots of Tomas' activism trace back to the 1950s, where after dissatisfaction with working conditions at the Iraq Petroleum Company, he learned about communism and joined the ICP. After 1963, with surmounting campaigns by the Ba'athist government of Iraq against communists, Tomas emerged as a leader and lead a diverse force of different ethnic and religious groups.

Tomas is considered one of the major figures of the ICP during the 1960s. He is remembered for both his actions during his time as leader of the ICP, as well as his leadership in the Assyrian community. Tomas continues to be memorialized and remembered by Assyrians from Iraq, especially Alqosh, where a statue was dedicated to him in 2011.

== Early life ==
Tomas was born in 1924 to the Chaldo-Assyrian Kaka family from Alqosh. He witnessed the Simele massacre first-hand when Assyrians escaped to Alqosh, and in his memoirs, he described his family's role in protecting twenty other families and refugees fleeing the massacre. As he noted in his memoirs, the village was under threat of attack due to taking in members of the Church of the East who had escaped. The events of Simele were crucial in shaping his political ideas in the future, and in his memoirs, the massacre is a symbol of both injustice and of the struggle against it as an injustice.

After completing primary education at the Mar Mikha School in Alqosh, Tomas moved to Mosul where in 1941 he was denied entrance to the city's only high school. After this rejection, he would go without schooling or employment until the following year, when the British began enlisting Assyrians and Kurds to the Iraq Levies. He would later join the Levies at 17 years old, and would remain until 1948 when he joined a brigade scheduled to fight in the 1948 Palestine war. After being discharged from the war the following year, he found his way to Kirkuk to work at the Iraq Petroleum Company in 1950. Tomas noted the heightened political awareness of workers at the IPC due to several frustrations, including the labor movement in Kirkuk that heightened his activism. It was during his time in Kirkuk where Tomas first learned about communism and joined the Iraqi Communist Party in the early 1950s.

== Career and struggle ==
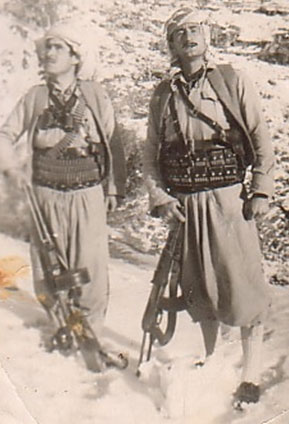
Photo of Tomas taken by Habib Tomi in 1964

Around 1959, Tomas had presided over the Workers' Committee of the IPC and was vacationing in Alqosh. He permanently relocated to his home town after hearing news of arbitrary arrests against communist-affiliated IPC workers, including all the members of the Workers' Committee, which also resulted in his resignation from the company. A few years later, prime minister Abd al-Karim Qasim was executed in the 1963 Iraqi coup d'etat. During the coup, Tomas's paternal cousin Ilyas Hanna Guhari was killed after being tortured. Tomas continued to act towards his political aspirations and collaborated with Assyrian figures in the Kurdish resistance movement. The communists where summarily executed and some led by Tomas fled to the mountains of northern Iraq, where they formed the armed communist guerilla group known as "al-Ansar".

Under Tomas' leadership, the village of Alqosh was a stronghold for the Iraqi Communist Party. Having emerged as a military leader within the ICP, his forces had begun stationing on top of the mountains of Alqosh to fight off government attacks from the Iraqi National Guard. Alqosh had been attacked three times by mid-July (each on 30 June, 7 July, and 9 July). The forces included collaboration with Hurmiz Malik Chikko (which began in 1963) as part of a diverse force of Arabs, Assyrians, Kurds, Turkmen, and Yazidis. During this period, Tomas emerged as a leader, earning the respect of Mustafa Barzani. After a switch in sides by his allies, the Iraqi Army alongside its affiliates gained ground in areas held by Tomas and his forces. Tomas was among many individuals that formed opposition groups loyal first to the Assyrian cause, protecting villages from Kurdish forces and the government of Baghdad.

In 1966, Tomas was elected to a committee of the ICP and declared a bureau member at a conference in Mosul. In 1976, he became a member of the Central Committee of the ICP and served as the secretary of the Nineveh branch until 1978. After the establishment of the Assyrian Democratic Movement, relations began to form between it and Assyrian members of the ICP. Tomas frequently visited the ADM office daily, despite supporting communism in his activism, providing moral support and advice as a supporter of the party. In his later years, stressed with divisions in the diaspora along the Assyrian naming dispute, Tomas met with figures from ADM and other Assyrian organizations in attempts to find a solution. During the 1992 Kurdistan Region general election, Tomas created the Chaldo-Assyrian list to compete for the five seats allotted for Assyrians, but won none.

== Personal life ==
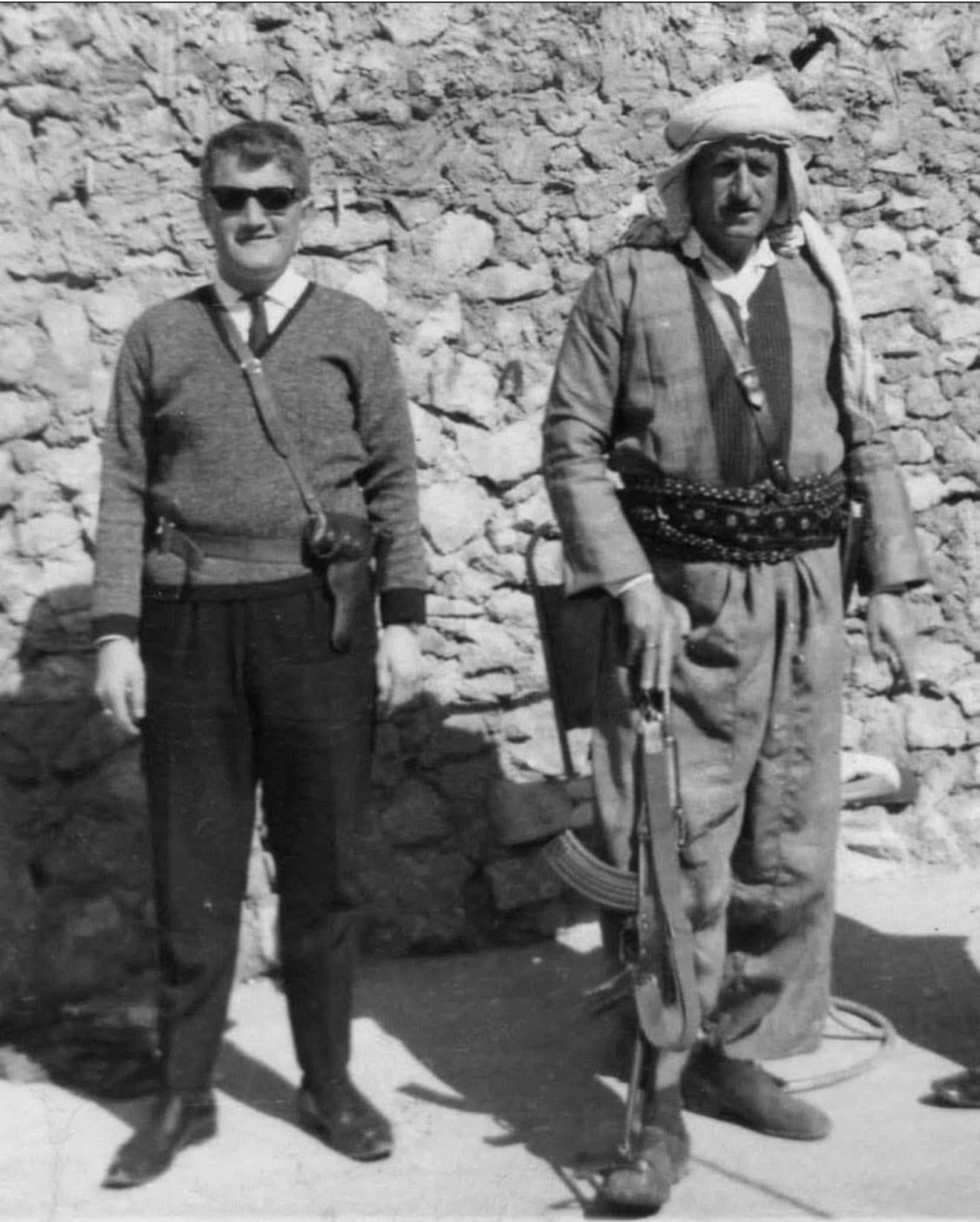
Toma Tomas with his eldest son Joseph at their home in Alqosh (1966)

In 1946, Tomas married Al-Mas Hesqial Zulfa. He had seven children, including five sons and two daughters. One of his sons, Joseph, passed away in Michigan on 10 June 2020.

After his permanent relocation to Alqosh, Tomas went into business ventures with his brother-in-law and founded an ice-making farm. He also established a poultry farm in Sharafiya. Personal accounts of Tomas also describe him as a skilled chess player.

== Death and legacy ==
Tomas died in Qamishli, Syria on 15 October 1996. A few days later, his body was transferred to a cemetery in Nohadra, but his remains were reburied in Alqosh around 2010. His memoirs, which he wrote between 1990 and 1996, were published in 2006. In July 2011, residents of Alqosh enacted a statue of Tomas in a park dedicated to him in an official ceremony, where eulogies and poems were delivered in his honor. The celebratory event was attended by Hamid Majid Mousa of the ICP and representatives of the Chaldean Syriac Assyrian Popular Council, as well as townspeople and journalists.

Alda Benjamen highlights that Tomas represented a complex convergence of identities that defined him, including Assyrian ethnicity, Chaldean Catholic affiliation, Iraqi nationality, communist politics, and descent from Alqosh. Tomas is remembered for the deep concern that he had for his hometown of Alqosh and for the wider Assyrian community. He claimed that Alqosh had preserved its authenticity and traditions despite tribal invasions and influence from ruling states. At the same time, the closeness he felt to his people made him a popular figure across intracommunal and political boundaries. Tomas' legacy and heroism is remembered by Assyrians to this day, including singer Talal Graish, who dedicated a song to him on his 2008 album X Love. In addition to being memorialized by the Assyrian community, Tomas is considered one of the major figures of the ICP during the 1960s.

== Bibliography ==
- Benjamen, Alda (2015). Negotiating the Place of Assyrians in Modern Iraq: 1960–1988 (PhD thesis). College Park, Maryland: University of Maryland.
- Benjamen, Alda (28 November 2018). Written at Washington, D.C.. "Assyrians between the State and the Iraqi Opposition: Minoritization and Pluralism in the Second Half of the Twentieth Century". International Journal of Middle East Studies. 50 (4). Library of Congress: 781–785. doi:10.1017/S0020743818000922. eISSN 1471-6380. ISSN 0020-7438.
- Benjamen, Alda (19 January 2022). Assyrians in Modern Iraq: Negotiating Political and Cultural Space. University of California, Berkeley: Cambridge University Press. doi:10.1017/9781108976633. ISBN 9781108976633.
- Donabed, Sargon (2010). Iraq and the Assyrian Unimagining: Illuminating Scaled Suffering and a Hierarchy of Genocide from Simele to Anfal (PhD thesis). University of Toronto.
- Donabed, Sargon (17 September 2015). Reforging a Forgotten History: Iraq and the Assyrians in the Twentieth Century. Edinburgh University Press. ISBN 978-0-7486-8605-6. JSTOR 10.3366/j.ctt14brxg2.
