= Iraqi Communist Party – Central Command (Wihdat al-Qa'idah) =

Wihdat al-Qa'idah was a fraction that emerged within the Iraqi Communist Party – Central Command, named after a publication founded in the mid-1970s by a Central Committee member of the party, Adil Abdul-Mahdi.

== History ==
The general secretary of the Iraqi Communist Party – Central Command, Najim Mahmud, accused Wihdat al-Qa'idah of breaching party discipline. Mahdi and associates were expelled from the party. Wihdat al-Qa'idah responded by claiming that they were the legitimate leadership of the Iraqi Communist Party – Central Command, and declared Mahmud expelled from the party. Effectively there were now two separate parties called Iraqi Communist Party – Central Command, the party led by the general secretary Mahmud and the party led by Widha al-Qa'idah group.

When Wihdat al-Qa'idah group was expelled, it began to openly criticize the leadership of Mahmud. A sizeable section of the party cadres sided with it. Moreover, it recruited new followers in the Iraqi diaspora in France and UK. The group also began publishing its own version of Tariq ash-Sha'ab ('People's Path', the name of the main organ of the pre-split party).

In September 1976 Wihdat al-Qa'idah held a party conference attended by important members of pre-split the Iraqi Communist Party – Central Command as well as some independent Iraqi Marxists. Participants consisted both of party activists living inside Iraq and those in exile. Instead of a general secretary's report, the editorial board of Wihdat al-Qa'idah presented their report to the conference. The conference elected a Central Organising Board, i.e. a provisional party leadership. The conference decided to continue the publication of Wihdat al-Qa'idah, and initiate a Kurdish publication as well. After the congress the party also began publishing an internal party organ, al-Kadir ash-Shiu'i.

The party reaffirmed its Marxist-Leninist foundations. It stated that the political order in Iraq was a form of comprador state capitalism. It blamed the 'reformist' leadership of the Iraqi Communist Party for enabling the Baathists to seize and remain in power in Iraq. Moreover, the party condemned the Soviet Union. On the issue of Arab nationalism, the analysis of the party stated that the Iraqi communists traditionally had failed to grasp the anti-imperialist characteristics of Arab nationalism. The party also issued support for the Kurdish right of self-determination, and called for communists to lead popular armed struggle in Kurdistan.

After the September 1976 conference the party continued to expand its membership, primarily in Britain and France.

In 1978 and early 1979, sectors of the party began to adopt the Three Worlds Theory of Mao Zedong.

In 1979, the Baathist regime contacted the party and offered them an alliance. At the time the Baathists were in the process of breaking their alliance with the Iraqi Communist Party. The invitation sparked a split in the party, and effectively the party was divided into two separate parties. Both claimed to the legitimate heirs of the legacy of the party and both of them publishing their own version of Wihdat al-Qa'idah. One of the groups now adhered to the Three Worlds Theory.

Both groups disappeared in the early 1980s. Adil Mahdi and his followers turned into Shi'a Islamists, initially supporting the Iranian president Abolhassan Banisadr and later supporting the line of Ayatollah Khomeini. Mahdi later became Vice President of Iraq.
