= Al-Asas =

Al-Asas (Arabic: الأساس, 'The Foundation') was an Arabic-language daily newspaper published by the Iraqi Communist Party. The newspaper was founded in 1948. A well-known lawyer and communist leader, Sharif ash-Sheikh, served as the editor of the newspaper. The Iraqi authorities closed down Al-Asas soon after it was launched.
