= Raid Jahid Fahmi =

Iraqi politician and economist

Comrade Raid Jahid Fahmi
- رائد جاهد فهمي
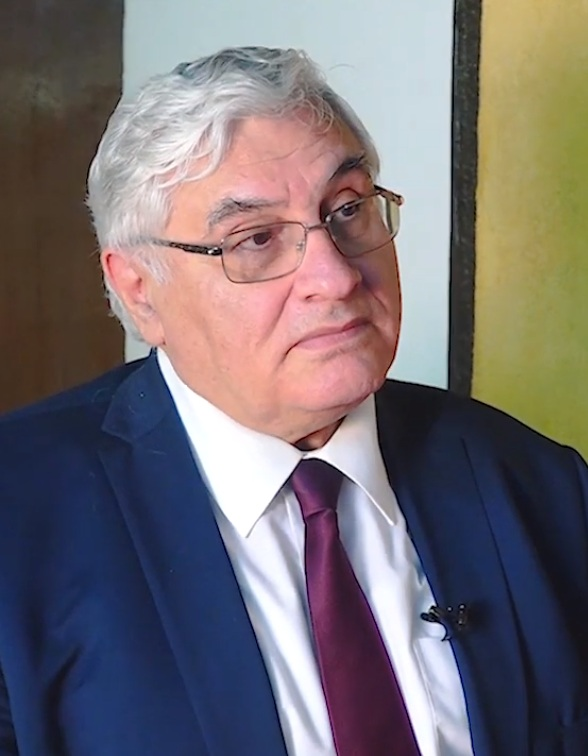
- Raid Fahmi, 24 September 2019

Secretary of the Iraqi Communist Party
- Incumbent
- Assumed office 4 December 2016
- Preceded by: Hamid Majid Mousa

Member of Parliament for Baghdad
- In office 3 September 2018 – 27 October 2019

Minister of Science and Technology
- In office 20 May 2006 – 21 December 2010
- Prime Minister: Nouri al-Maliki
- Preceded by: Basimah Yusuf Butrus
- Succeeded by: Abd al-Karim al-Samarrai

Personal details
- Born: 1950 (age 75–76) Baghdad, Kingdom of Iraq
- Party: Iraqi Communist Party

Raid Jahid Fahmi (Arabic: رائد جاهد فهمي; born 1950) is an Iraqi politician and economist who is the current secretary of the Iraqi Communist Party since 2016. He served as minister of science and technology in the first government of Nouri al-Maliki from 2006 to 2010.

== Biography ==
He is of Arab origin born in Baghdad. His father was a lawyer and a civil servant in the Iraqi foreign Ministry and held posts in Lebanon and Switzerland in the late 1950s and early 1960s. He has spent most of his life in exile. He is a graduate of the London School of Economics, Queen Mary, University of London and the Paris Sorbonne University and has worked as a researcher for the Industrial Bank of Kuwait, the OECD. He taught and gave lectures in educational and academic institutions in France and was the Iraqi Communist Party's representative in France. He edited the Al-Thaqafah al-Jadidah magazine.

The ICP contested the Iraqi legislative election of December 2005 as part of the Iraqi National List coalition, and in May 2006, Raid Fahmi was appointed Minister of Science and Technology in al-Maliki's government of national unity.

In August 2007, he was appointed head of the Commission on the Normalisation of the Status of Kirkuk. ICP contested the Iraqi legislative election of May 2018 as part of list Sairoon Alliance. Raid Fahmi was elected as member of the Council of Representative of Iraq (COR) and took charge of his office on September 3, 2018. Raid Fahmi announced his resignation from the Iraqi Parliament on the 27th of October 2019 in solidarity with the popular protest movement and in protest against the lack of effective action from the legislative power to put an end to the use of violence against the demonstrators by the security and other non official armed groups.

== Personal life ==
He is married and a father of four children.
