= Awni Yusuf =

Iraqi Kurdish politician and lawyer

Awni Yusuf was an Iraqi Kurdish politician and lawyer. He served as a judge at the Kirkuk Court of Cassation, and was appointed Minister of Public Works in Abd al-Karim Qasim's cabinet in mid-July 1959.

Yusuf was considered as close to the Iraqi Communist Party and the United Democratic Party of Kurdistan. He was dismissed from the cabinet on November 15, 1960.
