= Belarus–Iraq relations =

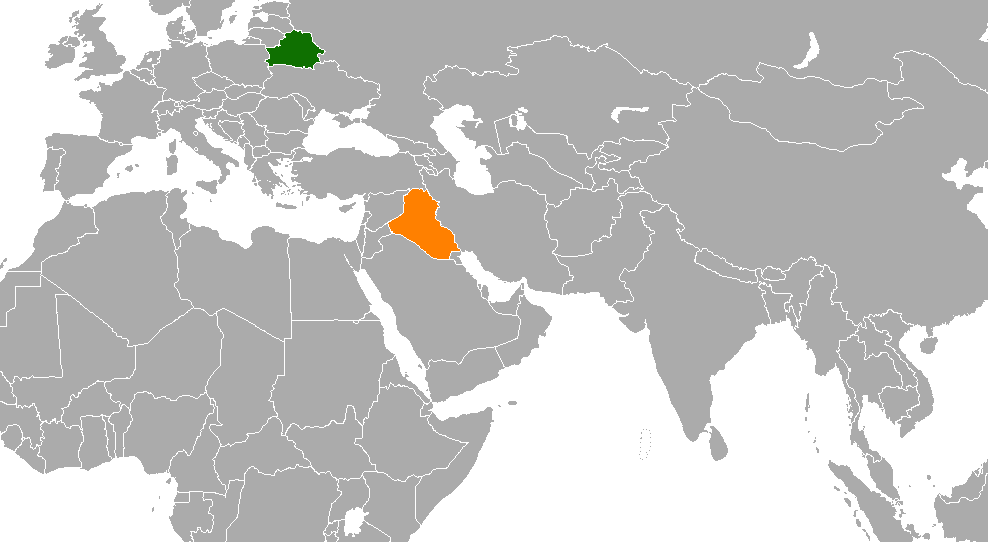

- Belarus: Iraq

Belarus does not have an embassy in Baghdad, but it does maintain a consulate in Erbil. Iraq has an embassy in Minsk. The last Ambassador of Iraq to Belarus was Haidar Hadi who served from July 2010 to November 2015. Since his post expired, there has been no Iraqi Ambassador in Belarus. Both are members of the Non-Aligned Movement.

== Saddam's Iraq and Belarus ==
The President of Belarus, Alexander Lukashenko, was one of the strongest supporters of Saddam Hussein. There are accusations that Belarus and Iraq were engaged in military cooperation. After the Iraq War, the Iraqi embassy in Minsk closed down.

== Post-2003 relations ==
Relations between the new government of Iraq and Belarus were reestablished in 2010. In October 2013, the Iraqi Minister of Trade made a visit to Minsk, where he spoke with Valentin Rybakov, the undersecretary of foreign affairs of Belarus. The two discussed increasing trade and investment of Belarusian companies in Iraq, as well as improving their bilateral relations in general. In late August 2014, the Foreign Minister of Belarus, Vladimir Makei, made an official visit to Iraq. He met with top Iraqi officials and discussed the expansion of economic ties between the two countries, and strengthening trade and investment. Iraqi officials saw this as support in their fight against extremism. In April 2015, a meeting took place in Minsk between President Lukashenko and Ibrahim al-Jaafari, the foreign minister of Iraq. They discussed expansion of trade, economic ties, and military cooperation. Iraq is interested in purchasing aircraft from Belarus. Lukashenko stated that a stable Iraq is in his interest.

== See also ==
- Foreign relations of Belarus
- Foreign relations of Iraq
