= People's Union (Iraq) =

People's Union اتحاد الشعب
- Founder: Hamid Majid Mousa
- Founded: 2005
- Dissolved: 2010
- Preceded by: Coalition between the Iraqi Communist Party & Hikmat Dawud Hakim
- Ideology: Communism; Secularism
- Political position: Left-wing
- Seats in the local governorate councils: 0 / 440

The People's Union (Arabic: اتحاد الشعب, Ittihad Al Shaab) was an electoral coalition in Iraq, led by the Iraqi Communist Party.

== 2005 elections ==
The People's Union was the main communist party list in the January 2005 Iraqi legislative election. It was made up of the Iraqi Communist Party and independent candidate Hikmat Dawud Hakim. Before the election, the Communist Party had attempted to form a wider coalition among secularist groups, but this effort failed. The list was led by Hamid Majid Mousa, who served on the Governing Council, and also included Mufid Mohammad Jawad al-Jazairi who served as minister of culture on the interim government. The party, while small, ran one of the more organized campaigns in the election, and its list of 257 candidates was the longest of any party. In the January elections, the People's Union received 69,920 votes, or 0.83% of ballots cast, earning them two seats in the transitional Iraqi National Assembly, where they were represented by Mousa and Jazairi.

Prior to the December 2005 elections, the list merged with several others to join the Iraqi National List.

== 2010 election ==
The People's Union was reformed on 14 November 2009 to contest the 2010 election. The People's Union participated but failed to gain any seats due to new election laws requiring parties to reach a certain threshold in a province before receiving seats.

During the 2010 elections the People's Union consisted of the following parties:

- Iraqi Communist Party
- National Democratic Party
- Democratic Chaldean Assyrian List
- Arab Revolutionary Labour Party
- Fraternity and Peace Party
- Independent candidates
