= Communist Action Organization in Iraq =

The Communist Action Organization in Iraq (Arabic: منظمة العمل الشيوعي في العراق, munażżamatu-l-‘amali-sh-shuyū‘ī fī al-'iraq) was a communist organization in Iraq. The organization was founded after a split from the Iraqi Communist Party. The founders of the Communist Action Organization saw the Communist Party leadership as a 'rightist and opportunist tendency' criticizing their past cooperation with the Baath Party. Moreover, the Communist Action Organization accused the Communist Party leaders for having deviated from Marxism-Leninism.
