= Khalid Bakdash =

1936–1995 Syrian Communist Party leader

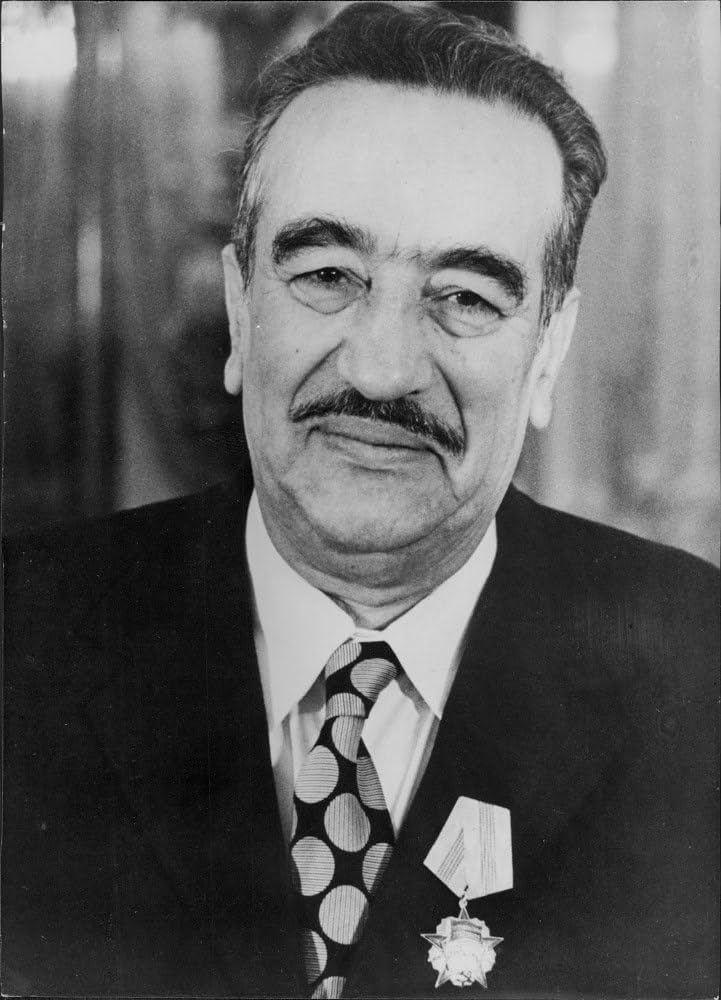

Personal details
- Born: 1912 Damascus, Syria, Ottoman Empire
- Died: July 15, 1995 (aged 82–83) Damascus, Syria
- Occupation: Secretary-general of the Syrian Communist Party; Member of the Parliament of Syria

Khalid Bakdash (occasionally spelled Khalid Bagdash or Khaled Bekdache, Arabic: خالد بكداش, romanized: Khālid Bakdāsh) (1912 – July 15, 1995) was a Syrian politician who was the founder of the Syrian Communist Party (SCP) and led it from 1936 until his death in 1995. In 1954, Bakdash became the first member of a communist party to be elected to an Arab parliament. He has since been called the "dean of Arab communism".

== Early life ==
Born in a Damascene Kurdish neighborhood to a Syrian-Kurdish family, he was first recruited to the communist cause at the age of 18, while a student at Damascus University. He was subsequently active in student agitation against the French occupation of Syria, and came to the attention of the police. In 1933 the party judged it best that he leave the country, and in 1934 he enrolled in the Communist University of the Toilers of the East in Moscow. During this time, Bakdash produced the first Arabic-language translation of The Communist Manifesto.

== Secretary of the Syrian Communist Party ==
Returning in 1936, Bakdash took control of the Communist Party of Syria and Lebanon as secretary, a post he would retain without interruption for the rest of his life. He led the Syrian underground against Vichy France during that regime's control of Syria. When Syria came under allied control in 1942, the French government promised it independence and legalized the Communist Party, which was until then banned.

Bakdash took a moderate approach as secretary of the Syrian Communist Party. The party rules and programme which he drew up in 1944 reflected a determination to conform to the political circumstances of the Arab world of the time. They emphasized the party's attachment to the anti-colonial struggle and sought to establish it as a democratic mass movement rather than the restricted Marxist–Leninist vanguard organisation which a close adherence to Leninist principles might have dictated.

Although Bakdash is often referred to as the doyen or elder statesman of Arab communism, his actual influence on other Arab communist parties was not as great as this phrase might suggest. He had, in particular, a stormy relationship with Fahd, leader of the Iraqi Communist Party from 1941 until 1949. In the early to mid-1940s, Bakdash supported the Iraqi People's Party led by Aziz Sharif, which followed the example of the Syrian Communist Party in seeking to build a broad party emphasizing the national question, contrary to the more orthodox Leninist approach adopted by Fahd's party. Fahd also appears to have suspected him of suborning Iraqi communists resident in Damascus.

== The Arab world's first communist deputy ==
Bakdash won a seat in Parliament in 1954, and during Syria's turbulent democratic period from 1954 to 1958 steered a cautious course. The main difficulty confronting him in this period was the question of Arab unity and in particular of unification with Gamal Abdel Nasser's Egypt. Bakdash was extremely critical of Nasser, especially after the latter started a campaign of repression against his political opponents, notably the Communists and Muslim Brothers. Nasser did not approve of political pluralism and parties were banned under his rule.

However, popular support for unity with Egypt forced Bakdash to accommodate to circumstances. Hanna Batatu, a notable historian of modern Arab politics, speculates that he must have been aware, and perhaps approved of, the participation of a communist general in the Syrian delegation which persuaded Gamal Abdel Nasser to proceed to the creation of the United Arab Republic which united Syria with Egypt in 1958. However, Bakdash himself provoked a harsh reaction from the Egyptian leader with his attack on the latter's policies published in December 1958, in which he called for the legalization of political parties and transformation of the UAR into a loose federation. This resulted in a fierce campaign of repression against the party. Bakdash himself left Syria for Moscow, where he would stay until 1966.

Syria seceded from the UAR in 1961, a decision supported by important elements in the army and the bourgeoisie as well as by the communists, but the separation was intensely controversial and the parties that had supported it found their popular backing greatly reduced; the Syrian party was reduced to some hundreds of members.

== Party leader under Ba'athist rule ==
On March 8, 1963, a coup by supporters of reunification with Egypt, essentially Baathists, Nasserists and the Arab Nationalist Movement put an end to the separatist government, although in the event reunification never took place. From then until the 1970s, the Communist Party would be repressed to one degree or another by the Ba'athist regime.

In 1966, the Syrian Ba'ath's secret military committee took power, and implemented a far-left line. Bakdash was allowed to return from Moscow, but forbidden from engaging in public political activity. After Hafez al-Assad took power in Syria in 1970, he announced his intention of reintroducing political pluralism in the context of popular democracy. This took the form of the National Progressive Front, a coalition of parties that supported the Arab nationalist and socialist orientation of the government and accepted the leadership of the Ba'ath Party. Faced with the choice between joining the front and an illegal operation, Bakdash opted to join; Riyad al-Turk would later lead a small radical faction of the party into opposition.

In 1986, a difference of opinion between Bakdash and Deputy General Secretary Yusuf Faisal led to a split in the party. Faisal was supportive of the new policies of perestroika and glasnost being pursued by Soviet party secretary Mikhail Gorbachev; Bakdash was opposed. Many of the intellectuals in the party left with Faisal, while Bakdash retained the support of the party's considerable Kurdish base.

Khalid Bakdash died in Damascus in 1995 at the age of 83. His widow, Wisal Farha Bakdash, succeeded him as party secretary.
