= Rashad Mandan Omar =

Iraqi politician and engineer

Rashad Mandan Omar is an Iraqi politician and engineer who was Minister of Science and Technology in the cabinet appointed by the Interim Iraq Governing Council in September 2003 and in the Iraqi Interim Government. He retained his position in the 2004 interim government.

A Sunni Muslim and Turkoman, originally from Kirkuk, Omar is an engineer by training and returned to Iraq shortly before being appointed, having spent time working in Dubai in the field of airport construction.

Preceded by Coalition Provisional Authority	Minister of Science and Technology; September 2003 – May 2005	Succeeded by Basimah Yusuf Butrus
