= Mufid Mohammad Jawad al-Jazairi =

Iraqi politician

Mufid Mohammad Jawad al-Jazairi (born 1939) was Minister of Culture in the cabinet appointed by the Interim Iraq Governing Council in September 2003 and in the Iraqi Interim Government. A Shia Muslim and member of the Iraqi Communist Party' central committee, al-Jazairi was a journalist by profession. He worked for the Arabic desk at Czechoslovak Radio in the 1960s and 1970s and married Czech radio journalist Pavla Jazairiová. He returned to Iraq in the 1980s and became a member of the Kurdish opposition. His older son Nisan Al-Jazairi is a merchant, his younger son Martin Jazairi is a reporter for Czech television in Russia.

He was elected to the Iraqi Council of Representatives in the Iraqi legislative election of December 2005 as one of two communist MPs from the Iraqi National List.

| Preceded by Coalition Provisional Authority | Minister of Culture; September 2003 – May 2005 | Succeeded by Nuri Farhan al-Rawi |
