= Basimah Yusuf Butrus =

Iraqi Assyrian politician (born 1963)

- ܒܐܣܡܐ ܝܘܣܦ ܦܛܪܘܣ باسمة يوسف بطرس

Minister of Science and Technology
- In office May 2005 – May 2006
- Prime Minister: Ibrahim al-Jaafari
- Preceded by: Rashad Mandan Omar
- Succeeded by: Raed Fahmy Jahid

Member of Iraqi Parliament
- In office March 8, 2010 – Unknown
- Prime Minister: Nouri al-Maliki

Personal details
- Born: 1963 (age 62–63) Erbil, Iraq
- Party: Assyrian Democratic Movement
- Education: Salahaddin University-Erbil
- Profession: Biochemist; Politician

Basimah Yusuf Butrus (Syriac: ܒܐܣܡܐ ܝܘܣܦ ܦܛܪܘܣ), also known as Basmah Yousif Putros (born 1963) is an Iraqi Assyrian politician who was Minister of Science and Technology in the Iraqi Transitional Government from May 2005 until May 2006. At the time of her election, she was the only Christian Minister in Iraq, and the second Assyrian woman to have been in the Iraqi government after Pascal Esho Warda.

A member of the Chaldean Catholic Church, Butrus had been politically involved with the Assyrian Democratic Movement.

== Early life ==
Butrus was born in 1963 to a Chaldean Catholic Assyrian family in Erbil.

Butrus took part in a number of political and human rights organizations before her election into government. Having joined the Assyrian Democratic Movement, she was formerly a member of the Central Committee of the party. She also participated in a number of different initiatives relating to charity and politics, including Women for Women International, a Catholic charity called Caritas, and an Assyrian cultural center in Ankawa.

She graduated from Salahaddin University-Erbil, earning a bachelor's in Chemistry and a master's degree in Biochemistry, becoming a lecturer before her foray into politics.

== Political career ==
In 2005, Butrus was elected to the position of Minister of Science and Technology in the Iraqi Transitional Government. Butrus had sworn on a Bible before her election into the position, and she was considered to be the only Christian minister in Iraq during her tenure. Additionally, she also had the opportunity to meet Pope Benedict XVI in a meeting that October, as part of meetings with Italian officials and the opening of an information bureau for Iraq.

In the same year, Butrus participated in the December 2005 Iraqi parliamentary election for the Erbil governorate, under the Rafidain List. However, the coalition lost and two other Assyrian candidates, Fawzi Hariri (representing the Kurdistan Democratic Party) and Ablahad Afraim Sawa (representing the Chaldean Democratic Union Party) were elected for Erbil. She was the first candidate out of three who ran as part of the coalition.

In 2010, Butrus ran once again for a position in parliament in the 2010 Iraqi parliamentary election, under the Rafidain List. This time, the coalition was the most successful during the election, receiving a total of 28,095 and allowing Butrus to win a seat for the ADM alongside Yonadam Kanna and a third candidate.

During her time as a member of parliament, Butrus stressed the recognition of the Assyrian people in Iraq and their rights to equal citizenship without discrimination of their unique background. She has also rejected the basis of Assyrian persecution which has caused heavy distrust among the community.

Preceded by Rashad Mandan Omar	Minister of Science and Technology; May 2005 - May 2006	Succeeded by Raed Fahmy Jahid
