= A free homeland and a happy people =

Arabic communist slogan

"A free homeland and a happy people" (Arabic: وطن حر وشعب سعيد watanun hurrun wa sha'bun sa'id) is an Arabic communist slogan. It was the slogan of the Syrian-Lebanese Communist Party, first adopted at the first conference of the Political Committee of the party (which also put Khalid Bakdash at the helm of the party). The slogan was adopted by the Iraqi Communist Party at its clandestine first national conference held in March 1944.
