= Iraqi Democratic Youth Federation =

Communist youth wing of the Iraqi Communist Party (founded 1951)

Iraqi Democratic Youth Federation إتحاد الشبيبة الديمقراطي العراقي
- General Secretary: Salam Noori
- Founded: 15 October 1951
- Headquarters: Baghdad
- Ideology: Communism; Left-wing nationalism Secularism; Nonsectarianism
- Political position: Left-wing
- International affiliation: World Federation of Democratic Youth

Website
- iraqicp.com

Iraqi Democratic Youth Federation (Arabic: إتحاد الشبيبة الديمقراطي العراقي, romanized: Atahad Alshibayabah Aldamukrati Alaraki) is a voluntary youth organization which campaigns for Iraqi youth rights and interests. It is affiliated with the Iraqi Communist Party.
