= Krikor Badrossian =

Armenian communist politician

Krikor Badrossian was an Armenian communist politician. He was a musician by profession. Badrossian arrived in Baghdad from Lebanon in 1937, where he joined the Iraqi Communist Party. He became a Central Committee member of the party. Badrossian headed the Armenian section of the party. In January 1950 he was arrested, along with many other communist leaders, in a police raid. In 1953 the Iraqi government expelled him to Lebanon.
