= Leninist Group in the Iraqi Communist Movement =

Leninist Group in the Iraqi Communist Movement (Arabic: الفريق اللينيني في الحركة الشيوعية العراقية) was a grouping of Iraqi communist exiles, dissidents from the Iraqi Communist Party. The main leaders of the group were two university professors at the University of Algiers, Khalid Abdullah as-Salam and Khalil al-Jazairi. Towards the late 1980s, the group began issuing a broadsheet publication, Nashrah.

The group signed an appeal of leftist and democratic exiles in the Baathist newspaper at-Thawra in December 1991. In the wake of the Gulf War, the Iraqi government issued a pardon for Iraqi exiles. As-Salam and al-Jazairi both returned to Iraq.
