= Voice of the Iraqi People =

Bulgarian radio station

Voice of the Iraqi People was a radio station managed by the Abroad Organization Committee (Arabic: لجنة تنظيم الخارج) of the Iraqi Communist Party, broadcasting from Sofia, Bulgaria. The radio station began services in the early 1960s. The Abroad Organization Committee appointed Aziz al-Haj to run the radio broadcasts. Since the party was underground and persecuted in Iraq, this radio station was virtually the only organ with which the party could reach out to people inside Iraq. However, the political movements of the Abroad Organization Committee was severely restricted by the conditions of their exile in the Socialist Bloc. While the Iraqi Communist Party developed a more critical approach to the Communist Party of the Soviet Union, the Voice of the Iraqi People broadcast were fully in line with the Soviet positions.
