= Fahd's Revolutionary Organization =

Iraqi communist organization

Fahd's Revolutionary Organization (Arabic: منظمة فهد الثورية) was a communist organization in Iraq. The organization was founded in the middle of 1985, after a split from the Iraqi Communist Party. The founders of the organization consisted of younger cadres of the Communist Party, who opposed the party leadership. The organization sought to build a new Marxist-Leninist party, recalling the legacy of the Communist Party stalwart leader Yusuf Salman Yusuf ('Fahd'). The organization published al-Munadhil ash-Shiui (المناضل الشيوعي, 'The Communist Militant'). The founder and leader of the organization, the labour leader Hikmat Kutani, was forced into exile in Canada. He became a member of Worker-communist Party of Iraq. Kutani died in 1999 in exile.
