= Hamid Majid Mousa =

Iraqi politician (born 1941)

- حميد مجيد موسى

Secretary of the Iraqi Communist Party
- In office 1993–2016
- Preceded by: Aziz Muhammad
- Succeeded by: Raid Fahmi

Member of the Governing Council
- In office July 2003 – 28 June 2004
- Preceded by: Council created
- Succeeded by: Council dissolved

Personal details
- Born: 7 January 1941 (age 85) Kingdom of Iraq
- Party: Iraqi Communist Party
- Education: Karl Marx Higher Institute of Economics
- Profession: Politician; Economist

Hamid Majid Mousa (Arabic: حميد مجيد موسى) is an Iraqi communist and former Secretary General of the Iraqi Communist Party. He was a member of the Interim Iraq Governing Council created following the United States's 2003 invasion of Iraq, and previously held a seat in the National Assembly.

== Early life ==
Mousa is an economist and petroleum researcher by training and studied at the Karl Marx Higher Institute of Economics in Sofia from 1960 to 1965. He is of Shia background.

== Communist Party ==
Mousa joined the Iraqi Communist Party in October 1959, and remained a member during the suppression of the party between 1965 and 1968. He was arrested in May 1968 due to his links with the party, although was released as part of an amnesty at the end of the year following the Ba'athist coup. He worked as an economic researcher in the national oil company from 1970 until late 1978 when he left Iraq. He had been appointed to the Central Committee of the party at the National Conference in 1976. He returned to Iraq in 1983, where he lived in the Kurdish-controlled north of the country and was involved in activities against Saddam Hussein's regime. In 1993, he became Secretary General of the Iraqi Communist Party and held this office for 23 years.

== Post-Saddam Iraq ==
Mousa was a member of the committee that drafted the Constitution of Iraq and was one of two candidates elected to the Iraqi National Assembly in the January 2005 elections as part of the People's Union list. He was again elected in the December 2005 elections as part of the Iraqi National List. The party ran as part of the People's Union electoral coalition for the 2010 parliamentary election, but failed to gain any seats.

== See also ==
- Iraqi Communist Party
- List of secretaries of the Iraqi Communist Party
