= Iraqi Armed Revolutionary Resistance =

Marxist insurgent group, operating in Iraq around 2007

The Iraqi Armed Revolutionary Resistance ('IARR) is a Marxist insurgent group alleged to be operating in Iraq around 2007.

== History ==
According to two reports by Zeeyad Khan in the now inactive blog IraqSlogger, the IARR's existence was made public in mid-May 2007, when a group of insurgents distributed leaflets with pictures of Argentinian revolutionary Che Guevara. The first article, citing leftist Iraqi news website Al-Badeel Al-Iraqi, described the group as "previously unknown". The leaflets described the IARR as a "movement of Iraqi Communists and Marxists experienced in armed struggle, leftist Iraqi nationalists, and their supporters." They also spoke against the "puppet government, the so-called Council of Representatives, terrorist Salafis, militias, the Interior Ministry, Iraqi traitors who came on American tanks, the American and British mercenaries, contractors, and their servants from the South Lebanese Army." The membership of the group is unknown, and no other source has reported on it.

== Attacks ==
The Revolutionary Resistance claimed responsibility for one attack, against United States troops in the area between Najaf and Karbala. Unnamed sources quoted by Al-Badeel Al-Iraqi said the attack targeted a convoy of "special forces of the occupation," referring (according to IraqSlogger) to US military contractors, at the Khan Al-Nus area on the main road between the Shi'a holy cities of Najaf and Karbala. According to the sources, the attack destroyed one vehicle and damaged another, killing the occupants of the first vehicle, although no other media source reported the attack or the casualties. The sources added that the Iraqi Armed Revolutionary Resistance would continue its military operations, according to a "meticulous and calculate [sic] plan, taking into account the delicate surrounding security situation and the intense intelligence presence of well-known elements and lackeys of the occupation, both Islamic and secular."
