= Ar-Rashid revolt =

1963 attempted coup in Iraq

- Part of the Cold War and the Arab Cold War
Date	3 July 1963
Location	Ar-Rashid army camp, Baghdad, Iraq
Result	Coup attempt defeated

Belligerents
(Iraq) Iraqi Government; Ba'ath Party; Ba'ath National Guard Militia	Iraqi Communist Party (Iraq) Iraqi Army Communist Cell

Commanders and leaders
Ahmed Hassan al-Bakr; Prime Minister of Iraq; Hazim Jawad; Secretary of the Ba'ath Party Regional Command	Muhammad Habib; Leader of Baghdad Communist Cell (Iraq) Hasan Sari (executed); Leader of Army Communist Cell

Strength
34,000 (Ba'ath National Guard Militia)	300–2,000

Casualties and losses
	1+

The ar-Rashid revolt was a failed coup d'etat and uprising against the Baathist government in Iraq in July 1963. The revolt was plotted by partisans of the Iraqi Communist Party (ICP) in junction with putschist military officers. The revolt failed to spread outside Baghdad and was crushed by the Baathist government forces.

== Background ==
On February 8, 1963, an army coup was staged, overthrowing the Iraqi Nationalist government of Abdul-Karim Qasim in favour of the pan-Arabist Abdul Salam Arif. The two had both been members of the free officers movement that orchestrated the overthrow the western-aligned Hashemite monarchy in the 14 July Revolution, but Ideological differences between the two caused tension. The coup had been planned for over a year, and followed one and a half months of Ba'athist agitations and protests against Qasim. After the coup the new regime instituted Arif as president and moved swiftly to eliminate its opponents, primarily the Iraqi Communist Party followers of Qasim. Thousands of leaders and key cadres of the Communist Party were detained, tortured and often killed, leaving the party in organizational disarray.

== Preparations of the revolt ==
Whilst the Baathists had crushed most of the Communist Party organization, there were some Communist Party cells in the labour movement and the army that had remained intact. The Baghdad organizations of the Communist Party had been one of the most militant sectors of the party prior to the crackdown. The party cells inside the military began contacting cells belonging to the Baghdad Workers Committee, which organized party activities inside trade unions in the capital, to plan an overthrow of the Baathists a few weeks after the Baathist take-over.

Ibrahim Muhammad Ali was a member of the Workers Central Committee of the Communist Party, and led a Workers Committee in Baghdad. He had tried in vain to seek direction from a group of Central committee members of the party, only to discover that they had been executed. Ali then proceeded on his own initiative to reorganize the civilian party cells in Baghdad. Ali directed Muhammad Habib (Abu Salam), a coffee-shop worker, to reorganize the party cells in the army. Habib was able to establish communications with Corporal Hasan Sari. Sari was in charge of one of the Communist Party cells inside the army.

Ali was captured by the intelligence services, after Communist Party members turned government informers had revealed his identity. He was tortured to death. Habib then had to take over Ali's leadership of the civilian cells as well as continuing the work with the army cells. Habib and Sari formed a 'Revolutionary Committee', preparing for a revolt. Sari would mobilize soldiers in an uprising, whilst Habib would mobilize civilians to provide aid to the soldiers. Two other Communist Party corporals and a tailor named Hafiz Latfah, took part in the planning.

The plotters presented their plan to the few remaining Central Committee members of the Communist Party. The Central Committee members rejected the plan, and labelled it as a violation of party discipline. Habib ignored their directions and did not inform Sari of the ruling by the party leadership. On the contrary, evidence suggested that Habib had conveyed to Sari that they had the full backing of the entire Communist Party. Together, Habib and Sari continued the preparations.

== The revolt ==
On July 3, 1963, the revolt was staged. Rebel soldiers as well as the Baghdad and Middle Euphrates sections of the Communist Party, together amassing 2,000 fighters, took control over the Ar-Rashid army camp in Baghdad. They were able to detain the camp commanders, the entire leadership of the Baathist National Guard militia, the Interior minister and the Foreign minister of Iraq.

Habib and Sari had selected the camp as the scene of the revolt, since around 1,000 pro-Qassem officers and communists were in detention there. The rationale was that once the detained officers had been freed, they would provide leadership for other army units around the country to join the rebellion.

However, even though the rebels had been able to seize the army camp they could not free the detainees as they met unexpected resistance from prison guards. The revolt never spread to other army units. Baathist forces were able to encircle the camp and crushed the revolt.

== Death train and aftermath ==
Within the Baath Party, the military sector demanded that all captured officers be executed. Civilians in the Baathist leadership opposed mass executions of officers, arguing that executions should be limited to 30 core leaders of the revolt. In the end, it was decided that all captured officers would be sent on a cattle train to the Nugra Salman desert prison. The train-ride (later nicknamed the 'Death Train') was supposed to take six hours, during which it was calculated that many would die in the scorching heat. The train driver, realising that his cargo consisted of humans, speeded up the ride to just two hours. Arriving at their destination, only one of the captured officers had died. The train driver's initiative combined with the fact that several of the officers had medical training, were decisive factors to limit the number of casualties.

After the ar-Rashid revolt, the Baathists stepped up their campaign against the Communist Party. Only the Middle Euphrates and Kurdish sections of the party remained intact.

== Soviet involvement ==
The revolt caused a rift in Iraqi–Soviet relations, with the Iraqi government claiming that it had evidence that Soviet instructors had helped plan the revolt and Radio Baghdad accusing the Soviet Union of "a plot against our national independence." There had been issues between Iraq and the Soviet Union before the revolt, with the Soviet Union suspending military shipments to Iraq and indicating support for Iraqi Kurdish rebels. Iraqi television had then retaliated by attacking the Soviet Union, particularly the Soviet policy in Hungary. Declassified Central Intelligence Agency (CIA) files state "there is strong evidence to suggest [Soviet] bloc involvement in the 3 July uprising at Camp Rashid," including "confessions" from "members of a Soviet bloc intelligence net in Baghdad ... the net was organized and directed by [redacted] and have implicated local Soviets with ... staging the 3 July 1963 coup attempt." The CIA also believed "the USSR will work both through propaganda media and covertly to bring about the overthrow of the Ba'ath in Iraq, calculating that any successor regime would be more favorable to Communist interests."

== See also ==
- Al-Ansar (Iraq)
