= Iraqi National List =

- Leader: Ayad Allawi
- Founded: 2005
- Dissolved: 2009
- Ideology: Big tent

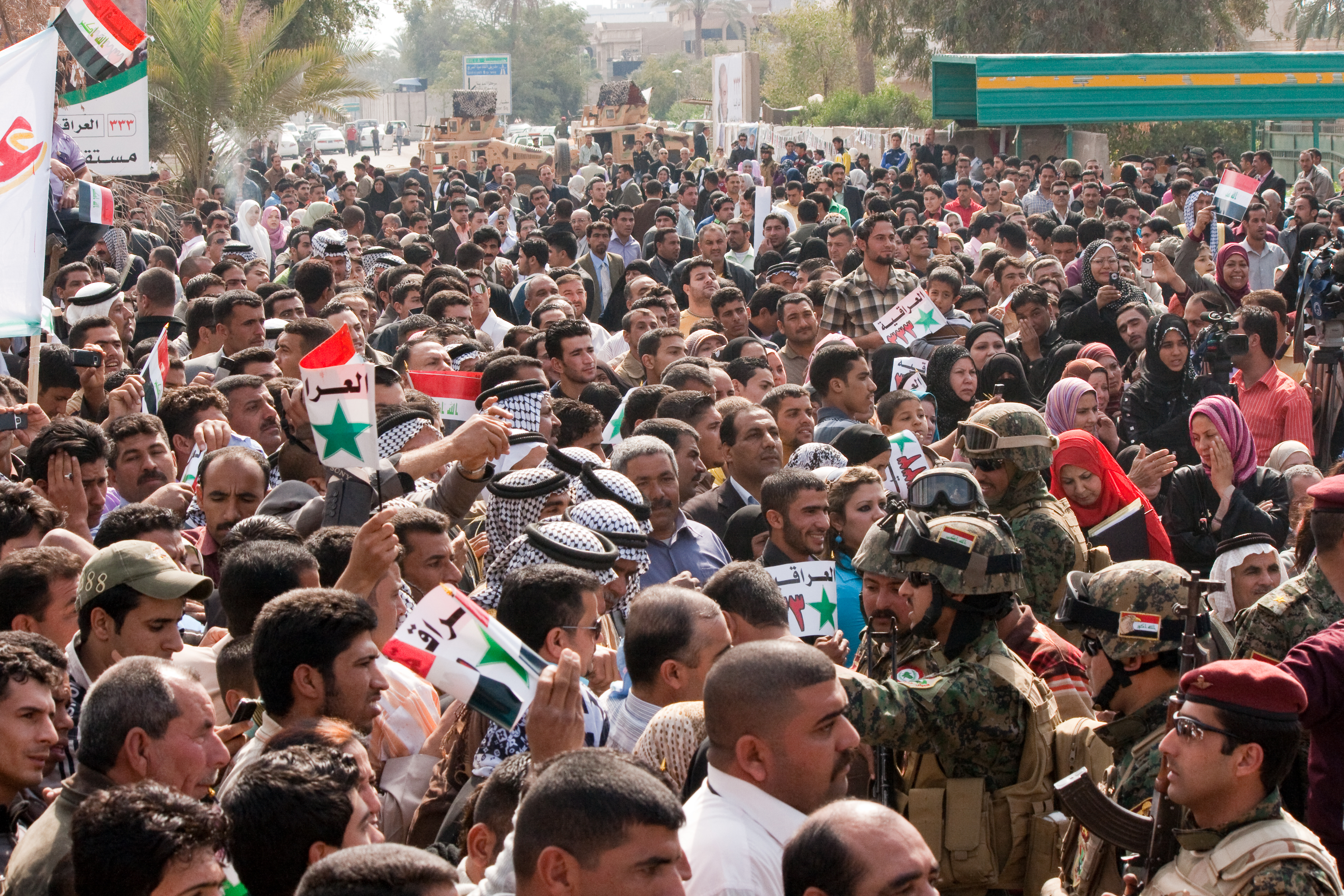

The Iraqi National List (Arabic: القائمة العراقية الوطنية) was a coalition of Iraqi political parties who ran in the December 2005 Iraqi elections and got 8.0% of the vote and 25 out of 275 seats.

== History ==
Prior to the December election the Iraqi list merged with Ghazi al-Yawer's The Iraqis, the most successful Sunni party in the January elections, and the Communist People's Union. The Iraqi National List alliance was created to offer a secular, cross-community alternative - composed of both Sunnis and Shiites - to the religious Shiite United Iraqi Alliance and the Sunni Iraqi Accord Front.

== Member parties ==
- Iraqi Communist Party
- Assembly of Independent Democrats
- People's Union
- Al-Qasimy Democratic Assembly
- Iraqi Republican Group
- Arab Socialist Movement
- Independent Democratic Gathering
- Iraqi National Accord
- League of Iraqi Turkmen Lords and Tribes led by Abd Al-Hammed Al-Bayati
- Alfurat Al Awsat Assemblage
- The Iraqis
- Loyalty For Iraq Coalition
- Independent Iraqi Alliance
- Independent Iraqi Sheikhs Council
- The National List
- Al-Ahrar

== December 2005 election results ==
The coalition ended up with 977,325 votes, or 8.0% of the vote, which amounted to 25 out of 275 seats in the Iraqi National Assembly. The following 25 people were nominated as the coalition's representatives:

1. Usama Abd Al Azeez Al Nujaifi - Sunni Arab
2. Iyad Allawi - Shiite Arab, Iraqi National Accord
3. Iyad Raouf Mohamed Jalal Al Deen
4. Jamal Abd Al Hadi Batekh
5. Hajem Mahdi Saleh
6. Husam Abd Al Kareem Abed Ali
7. Husain Ali Al Sha'alan
8. Hamid Majid Mousa - Shiite, Iraqi Communist Party
9. Kheir Alla Kareem Kathem
10. Radwan Husain Abbas Al Kleidar
11. Sa'ad Sfouk Al Masoudi
12. Safia Taleb Ali
13. Aida Shareef Tawfeeq
14. Alia Naseef Jasem
15. Abd Al Lateef Abd Al Wahab Husain
16. Adnan Pachachi - Sunni Arab, Assembly of Independent Democrats
17. Ezzat Hasan Ali
18. Ghazi al-Yawar - Sunni Arab, The Iraqis
19. Falah Hassan al-Naqib
20. Mohamed Tawfeeq Husain
21. Mohamed Abbas Mohamed
22. Mofeed Mohaed Jawad
23. Mahdi Ahmad Al Hafeth
24. Maysun al-Damluji
25. Wael Abdul Latif
