= Haidar Hadi =

Iraqi politician (born 1970)

Haidar Al-Athari حيدر العذاري

Ambassador of Iraq
- Incumbent
- Assumed office 6 October 2009

Ambassador of Iraq to Minsk, Belarus
- In office 10 June 2010 – 31 October 2015

Head of Administrative Department, Iraqi Foreign Ministry
- In office 1 November 2015 – 19 December 2016

Ambassador of Iraq to Moscow, Russia
- In office 24 December 2016 – 6 November 2019

Ambassador of Iraq to Amman, Jordan
- In office 13 November 2019 – August 2022

Head of European Department, Iraqi Foreign Ministry
- In office September 2022 – May 2024

Ambassador of Iraq to Moscow, Russia
- Incumbent
- Assumed office June 2024

Personal details
- Born: July 27, 1970 (age 56) Baghdad, Iraq
- Spouse: Maysum Hadi (m. 2000)
- Children: 2
- Education: Nottingham Trent University

Haidar Mansour Hadi Al-Athari (born 27 July 1970), known as Haidar Hadi, is an Iraqi politician who currently serves as the ambassador of the Republic of Iraq to Russia and Belarus. Born in Baghdad, Iraq he went to school in his home city and moved to the United Kingdom in 1991. After graduating from university in the UK he worked as an export manager for Canary Trading Company Limited from 1997 to 2000. In 2000, he took up the role of Project Manager at Webstar PLC until 2003. He then moved to Jordan initially and then back to Iraq. He has been an ambassador for the Iraqi government since October 2009. Haidar has already served as the ambassador to Minsk, Belarus for five and a half years and the ambassador to Moscow, Russia for three years. He was the first Iraqi ambassador to serve in Belarus since the Iraqi embassy was shut down in 2003, following the U.S. invasion of Iraq. After his post in Minsk, he returned to Baghdad. During his time in Baghdad, he was part of several delegations going to countries such as Egypt and South Korea. In December 2016, Haidar arrived in Moscow to begin his second post as ambassador which lasted three years before he was transferred to Amman, Jordan where he served until 2022 before returning to Baghdad. Back at the Ministry of Foreign Affairs in Baghdad, Haidar led the European Department until he was posted to Russia for a second time in June 2024. Haidar has been directly involved in setting up two destinations for Iraqi Airways, Minsk and Moscow, and, as a result, there are regular, scheduled flights between Baghdad and the two European cities. In October 2014, he was made a Distinguished Fellow at the New Westminster College in British Columbia, Canada.

== Early life and education ==
Haidar was born in Baghdad, Iraq on 27 July 1970. Both his parents are originally from Najaf, in south-central Iraq. His father, Mansour Hadi Al-Athari, has a military background, having served in the Iraqi army during the Iran–Iraq War before becoming a businessman based in Baghdad, Iraq and Amman, Jordan. Haidar is the second eldest child and the only son of his parents. He grew up in Baghdad throughout his childhood and finished elementary school and high school in Baghdad. Haidar attended university in England where he studied Business Administration, obtaining a degree from Nottingham Trent University. After graduating, he moved to London where he would remain until 2005, getting married in 2000.

== Early career ==
=== Post-Graduation ===
After graduating from university, Haidar took a job as an export manager for Canary Trading Company Limited from 1997 to 2000. In 2000, he took up the role of Project Manager at Webstar PLC. Both of these jobs were in London, where he worked for several years.

=== Move to Jordan ===
In 2005, Haidar and his family moved to Amman, the capital of Jordan.

=== Moving Back to Iraq ===
In 2006, Haidar moved back to Iraq after 15 years which he spent mainly in England and Jordan. In 2007, Haidar's name was put forward as a nomination to be an ambassador by former prime minister and vice president of Iraq Ayad Allawi. In October 2009, Haidar Hadi was formally announced as an Iraqi ambassador.

== Political career ==
=== Ayad Allawi’s nomination ===
In 2007, former Iraqi vice president and prime minister Ayad Allawi nominated Haidar Hadi to be an ambassador. Following the nomination, Haidar was successfully announced as an ambassador in October 2009.

=== Post to Belarus ===
In June 2010, Haidar was announced as the new Iraqi ambassador to Belarus. This made him the first Iraqi ambassador to serve in Belarus since the Iraqi Embassy shut down in 2003 and only the third Iraqi ambassador in history to serve in Belarus. This was his first post as an ambassador and he went into Minsk as the second youngest ambassador in the Iraqi government and the youngest in Belarus. He spent his first few months in Minsk setting up the ambassador's residence and the Iraqi Embassy, meeting with the Iraqi students and passing his credentials to Belarusian president Alexander Lukashenko. In 2015, Haidar began working on starting a direct line between Baghdad and Minsk with Iraqi Airways. The project was delayed several times, and it took a few years to set up and Haidar monitored the situation until the first flight landed in Minsk in early 2017. Iraqi Airways maintained the route to Minsk and added more flights in as it grew more popular.

=== Post to Russia ===
In December 2016, Haidar and his family moved to Moscow for the start of his second post. After a few months refurbishing the ambassador's residence, Haidar and his family moved in to the home. For the first few months, Haidar was setting up his post and gradually inducting himself into the political community of Russia. In March 2017, Haidar passed his credentials to Vladimir Putin, President of Russia, officially marking his position. During his time in Russia, Haidar has visited multiple cities such as Moscow, St. Petersburg, Grozny, Sochi, Magas, Ulyanovsk, Samara, Yekaterinburg, Chelyabinsk, Maykp and Kazan on official and personal visits.

=== Return to Belarus ===
In February 2018, whilst serving as an ambassador to the Russian Federation, Haidar was appointed as a non-resident ambassador to Belarus. His return to the country marked the first time Belarus had an active Iraqi ambassador since he left his post two years ago. After being transferred from Moscow to Jordan in November 2019, Haidar was no longer the non-resident ambassador to Belarus, which once again left Minsk without an active Iraqi ambassador.

=== Post to Jordan ===
In November 2019 Haidar moved into Amman, Jordan to begin the third post of his career. He passed his credentials to King Abdullah II of Jordan in December 2019. In 2020, he was also assigned as the non-resident ambassador to Palestine.

=== Distinguished Fellow ===
Haidar is a Distinguished Fellow for the New Westminster College in British Columbia, Canada. He was given the role in October 2014 and still holds it. He has a biography on their website and his CV can also be seen there.

=== Honorary Degrees ===
In May 2018, Haidar received an Honorary Doctorate Diploma from Adyghe State University. In November 2018, Ulyanovsk State Technical University named Haidar as an Honorary Professor.

== Personal life ==
Haidar's family originate from the city of Najaf in Iraq, but he was born in Baghdad and lived there until he moved to England to go to university in 1991, where he graduated.

== Career timeline ==
- October 2009: Officially named Iraqi ambassador
- July 2010-October 2015: Ambassador of Iraq to Minsk, Belarus
- 2012-October 2015: Head of Council of Arab Ambassadors assigned to Minsk, Belarus
- 2012-October 2015: Dean of Arab Diplomatic Missions accredited to Minsk, Belarus
- October 2014 – present: Distinguished Fellow at New Westminster College, British Columbia
- December 2016-November 2019: Ambassador of Iraq to Moscow, Russia
- February 2017: First Iraqi Airways flight lands in Minsk, Belarus
- September 2017: First Iraqi Airways flight lands in Moscow, Russia
- February 2018-November 2019: Ambassador of Iraq to Minsk, Belarus (non-resident)
- May 2018: Received Honorary Doctorate Diploma from Adyghe State University
- November 2018: Received Honorary Professor Title from Ulyanovsk State Technical University
- November 2019 – present: Ambassador of Iraq to Amman, Jordan
- 2020–2022: Ambassador of Iraq to Palestine (non-resident)
