= Iraqi Communist Party – Central Command =

Iraqi Communist Party – Central Command الحزب الشيوعي العراقي – القيادة المركزية
- General Secretary: Aziz al-Hajj (1967–1969); Ibrahim al-Alawi (from 1969)
- Founded: September 17, 1967
- Split from: Iraqi Communist Party
- Newspaper: Tariq ash-Shaab
- Ideology: Marxism–Leninism

The Iraqi Communist Party – Central Command (Arabic: الحزب الشيوعي العراقي – القيادة المركزية) was a communist party in Iraq that broke away from the Iraqi Communist Party in 1967. Disagreements had simmered in the Iraqi Communist Party following the military defeat in the Six-Day War, with oppositional factions considering the party line being too docile towards the incumbent government. The Iraqi Communist Party – Central Command attempted to build a guerrilla movement in the Middle Euphrates region and the southern marshes of Iraq. It violently opposed both the Arif and Baathist governments. In 1969 the party leadership and many ordinary party members were arrested, many of them being killed in captivity. While the Iraqi Communist Party – Central Command continued, it never regained a prominent role in national politics.

== Factional divide in the Communist Party ==
Aziz al-Hajj was an Iraqi Communist Party cadre who was sent to Prague to represent the party at the editorial office of World Marxist Review in 1959. Al-Hajj would become dissatisfied with shifts in the party line and its position towards the government of Abdul Salam Arif. In Prague, al-Hajj organized an oppositional faction of younger Iraqi communists. He returned to Iraq in January 1967 and emerged as the unofficial leader of the Baghdad Regional Committee of the Communist Party. In February 1967, he was inducted into the Politburo of the Communist Party.

Divisions in the Iraqi Communist Party Politburo emerged after the military defeat in the Six-Day War. Tensions brewed inside the Iraqi Communist Party regarding the docile opposition to the Arif government and its ambiguous stance concerning Kurdish rights. Another oppositional grouping, nicknamed the 'Cadre Faction', emerged from a meeting held on June 30, 1967. The leading figure of the Cadre Faction was Khaled Ahmed Zaki (party-name 'Zafer'), who argued that the party had deviated from the Fahd line and shifted towards revisionism after the party becoming subordinated to Abdul Karim Qasim in 1959. Furthermore, Zaki argued that the rightist turn had been cemented with the new party line adopted in June–August 1964. Zaki called on the Iraqi Communist Party to purge the party leadership of the supporters of the August 1964 line and hold a party congress.

The Cadre Faction was a relatively small group, but after the June 30, 1967 meeting the group began preparing for armed struggle. It set up armed unites in the southern marshes, the Middle Euphrates region and Kurdistan. The Cadre Faction had a certain degree of influence in Thawrah City and al-Shu'ala (two Baghdad districts), and among officers, intellectuals and peasants in al-'Amarah, al-Gharraf and the Middle Euphrates region. Initially the Baghdad Regional Committee sought support from the Central Committee to confront the Cadre Faction, but this move failed. Al-Hajj then approached the Cadre Faction, to join forces against the Central Committee but the Cadre Faction turned down the invitation.

In the midst of growing tensions inside the party, Al-Hajj tried to take prevent a party split by arresting the Central Committee but this plot failed. Following al-Hajj's failure to take control over the party, al-Hajj and the Cadre Faction joined forces and broke with the Iraqi Communist Party.

== Central Command established ==
On September 17, 1967, the Iraqi Communist Party–Central Command was formally established as a separate organization. The moniker 'Central Command' was used to distinguish it from the pro-Soviet main Iraqi Communist Party, which in turn became nicknamed "Iraqi Communist Party–Central Committee". The new party attracted a significant following coming from the erstwhile Middle Euphrates Branch of the Iraqi Communist Party, the at-Thawrah City Party Organization and the workers cells with the Baghdad Workers Bureau.

The new party had a five-member Politburo consisting of Aziz al-Hajj, Kadhim Rida as-Saffar, Ahmad Khadr as-Safi, Ahmad Mahmoud al-Hallaq and Matti Hindi Hindu. Al-Hajj served as general secretary of the party. The party took a militant stance against the government and the bourgeois class. The party called for a 'revolutionary popular democratic regime under the leadership of the workings class'. The party supported the Kurdish right to self-determination. Compared to the Iraqi Communist Party–Central Committee, the Iraqi Communist Party–Central Command was more hostile towards the Baath Party.

The party published the irregular periodical Munadhil al-Hizb ('Party Militant') 1967-1968- The party organ Tariq ash-Shaab ('Path of the People') began publisheing in October 1967.

The party called for 'arming of the masses' and 'popular armed struggle in the towns and countryside'. In the autumn of 1967 the Iraqi Communist Party–Central Command was engaged in a series of clashes with security forces in southern regions of Middle Euphrates and the marshes. The Iraqi Communist Party–Central Command guerrilla campaign in south Middle Euphrates region and southern marshes provoked fears among both Shia and Sunni religious leaders. The Baathists seized moment by participating in anti-communist rallies Baghdad and elsewhere.

The Iraqi Communist Party–Central Command among few groups, opposed to Moscow and the Arab national bourgeoise, that were labelled was 'pro-Chinese'. But there was no public evidence of any links between the party and its Chinese counterparts, and the party rejected the label 'pro-Chinese'.

== Party conference of January 2, 1968 ==
The Iraqi Communist Party–Central Command held a party conference on January 2, 1968. The party-adopted tactical line document, based on Zaki's ideas, called for popular armed struggle, a position with Maoist inspirations. The Iraqi Communist Party–Central Command rejected the established Iraqi Communist Party–Central Committee tactic of supporting military coups, arguing that the army was "an instrument of the capitalist-feudalist state" and that the senior leadership of army was intimately linked to the "anti-communist, anti-working class and anti-Kurdish nationalism camp".

On June 3, 1968, Zaki and two other party cadres (Mohsen Hawas and Kazem Manather) were killed in battle at Hawr al-Ghamuka, in the southern marshes.

== Baathist coup and launch of People's Revolutionary War ==
The Iraqi Communist Party–Central Command had violently opposed the Abdul Rahman Arif government, and continued militant struggle against the new Baath government after the coup of July 17, 1968. Following the coup, the Baathists reached out to both communist factions and offered them ministerial cabinet posts in the new government. The Iraqi Communist Party–Central Command had rejected the offer. For months after the coup a large number of communist cadres were killed, their bodies dumped in rivers or alleyways.

In late 1968 the Iraqi Communist Party–Central Command proclaimed the launch of 'people's revolutionary war', with a campaign of raids on police posts and banks. The party conducted 'expropriations', 'revolutionary hold-ups' and car bombings. At one point the party attacked the residence of Saddam Hussein. The Iraqi Communist Party–Central Command had an organization, Jihaz as-Siddami ('Strike Force'), led by party Central Committee member Saleh Rida al-Askari, in charge of party security.

== Crack-down and confessions ==
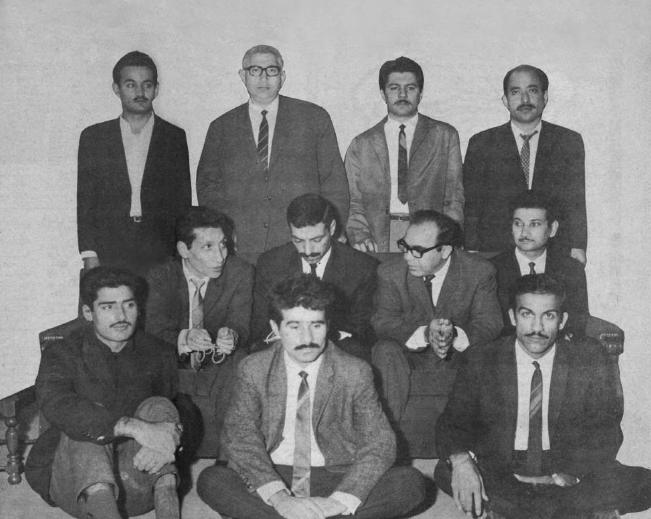
The leadership of Iraqi Communist Party (Central Command), photographed after arrest by authorities in 1969. Back row (standing), from left to right: Saleh Rida al-Askari (Central Committee member, in-charge of Jihaz as-Siddami), Peter Yusuf (Central Committee member), Malik Mansur (Central Committee member), Kazem Rida al-Saffar (Poliburo member, second-in-command in the party after al-Hajj). Middle row (seated), from left to right: Aziz al-Hajj, Talal Salman (reporter of as-Sayyad magazine, interviewing al-Hajj), Khudayr Abbas az-Zubaydi (Central Committee member), Ahmad Khadr as-Safi (Politburo member).

The Iraqi Communist Party–Central Command guerrilla campaign against the Baath government culminated with the arrest of al-Hajj, all other Politburo members and many rank-and-file party members. The Iraqi Communist Party–Central Command had become a primary target of Baathist repression, more so than the Iraqi Communist Party–Central Committee. Al-Hajj was arrested in February 1969. Two of the Politburo members would die under torture. The three other broke down under the pressure of torture, and al-Hajj confessed to his captors. In April 1969 al-Hajj made a televised speech in which he called upon fellow party members to cooperate with the Baath. Scores of Iraqi Communist Party–Central Command members were jailed or killed following al-Hajj's confessions.

In June 1969, in the wake of the crack-down, the Iraqi Communist Party–Central Committee First Secretary Aziz Mohammed in his address to the International Meeting of Communist and Workers Parties in Moscow made a thinly veiled attack on Iraqi Communist Party–Central Command, stating that '[d]angerous tendencies surfaced in our party, too, as represented by a divisive "ultra-left" group of adventurers. [...] That these tendencies appeared was due to the adventurist policy and nationalist and anti-internationalist line of the ruling group in China. However, our party has coped with this petty-bourgeois trend, fought it ideologically until it was destroyed, crushed by its own barren sectarian ventures.'

== New leadership ==
Following the crack-down the influence of the Iraqi Communist Party–Central Command was marginalized. After the killings and arrests of the main party leaders, Ibrahim al-Alawi (party name 'Najm Mahmoud') became the de facto party leader of the Iraqi Communist Party–Central Command. He convened a meeting in August 1969, which elected new party leadership.

In 1972 the Iraqi Communist Party–Central Command condemned the move of the Iraqi Communist Party–Central Committee to allow two communists to take ministerial cabinet posts in the Baath-led government as treason. When the Iraqi Communist Party–Central Committee joined the National Progressive Front in July 1973, the Iraqi Communist Party–Central Command condemned the move as treachery.

In 1974 the Iraqi Communist Party–Central Command organized a 'Third Party Conference'.

== Wihdat al-Qa'dah split ==
In the mid-1970s a faction emerged within the party, led by Adil Abdul-Mahdi. This faction began publishing the periodical Wihdat al-Qa'idah ("Unity of the Base"). Al-Alawi accused the Wihdat al-Qa'idah group of breaching party discipline, and Mahdi and his associates were expelled from the party. The Wihdat al-Qa'idah group responded by claiming they were the legitimate leadership of the Iraqi Communist Party–Central Command and declared al-Alawi expelled from the party. Effectively the Wihdat al-Qa'idah group now constituted a separate party of its own. A sizeable section of Iraqi Communist Party–Central Command cadres sided with the breakaway group. In September 1976 the Wihdat al-Qa'idah group held a party conference, comparable to a party congress. At the conference, most of the more important members of the pre-split Iraqi Communist Party–Central Command participated, as well as some independent Iraqi Marxists.
