= Iraqi Communist Party =

Iraqi Communist Party الحزب الشيوعي العراقي
- Abbreviation: ICP (حشع)
- Leader: Raid Fahmi
- Founded: 31 March 1934; 92 years ago
- Headquarters: Al Nithal Street, Baghdad
- Newspaper: Al-Qaidah; The Spark (الشرارة); Path of the People (طريق الشعب)
- Youth wing: Iraqi Democratic Youth Federation
- Paramilitary wing: Popular Resistance (1958–1963); Al-Ansar (1979–1988)
- Ideology: Communism; Reformism; Secularism; Nonsectarianism; Historically: Marxism–Leninism; Revolutionary socialism
- Political position: Left-wing; Historically: Far-left
- National affiliation: National Union Front (1954–1958); National Progressive Front (1974–1979); People's Union (2005–2010); Civil Democratic Alliance (2013–2018); Alliance Towards Reforms (Saairun) (2018–2021); Albadil Alliance (2025)
- International affiliation: IMCWP
- Colors: Red and White
- Slogan: "A free homeland and a happy people" (وطن حر وشعب سعيد)
- Council of Representatives: 0 / 329

Party flag

Website
- iraqicp.com

The Iraqi Communist Party (Arabic: الحزب الشيوعي العراقي al-ḥizb aš-šiyūʿī al-ʿirāqī; Kurdish: حیزبی شیووعیی عێراقی, romanized: ḥizbī šiyūʿītē ʿirāqī) is a Marxist party and the oldest active party in Iraq. Since its foundation in 1934, it has been a major left-wing party in Iraqi politics. It played a prominent role in shaping the political history of Iraq between its foundation and the 1970s. The Party was involved in many of the most important national uprisings and demonstrations of the 1940s and 1950s. It suffered heavily under the Ba'ath Party and Saddam Hussein but remained an important element of the Iraqi opposition and was a vocal opponent of the United Nations sanctions imposed on Iraq after the Gulf War of 1991.

It opposed the United States invasion of Iraq in 2003, however has now participated in the new political institutions. It received little support in the December 2005 Iraqi general elections. The party gained some seats in each province in which the 2013 Iraqi governorate elections were held. The party joined the newly established Sairoun Alliance in the 2018 parliamentary elections, who gained the highest number of votes and a total of 54 seats in the Iraqi parliament.

== History ==
=== Founding (1924–1929) ===
The history of Marxist ideology and organization in Iraq can be traced to a single individual, Husain al-Rahhal, a student at the Baghdad School of Law, who in 1924 formed what is now seen as the first "Marxist" study circle in Iraq. This group of young intellectuals initially began meeting in Baghdad's Haidarkhanah Mosque (a location also famous as a meeting place for revolutionaries in 1920) and discussing "new ideas" of the day. They eventually formed a small newspaper, Al-Sahifah ("The Journal"), which detailed a decidedly Marxist ideology. Membership in this circle included such influential Iraqis as Mustafa Ali, Minister of Justice under Abdul-Karim Qasim, and Mahmoud Ahmad Al-Sayyid, considered Iraq's first novelist. Al-Rahhal, an accomplished polyglot, was able to translate articles from various European Communist and Marxist newspapers, thus introducing many new ideals into Iraqi intellectual society. While the paper lacked a definite agenda or program, the majority of the writing was centered on the need to break down the strong influence of tradition in Iraqi society. This included equal rights for women and the abolition of feudal practices. After six issues and several government crackdowns, the paper published its final issue in 1927 and was permanently shut down. From this point on Al-Rahhal exerted his influence only from the background, most notably through the youth organization Nadi Al-Tadamun ("The Solidarity Club"). Through this organization he helped to inspire Iraq's first student demonstrations on 30 January 1927 (over the firing of certain controversial teachers) and 8 February 1928 (over the visit of prominent British Zionist Alfred Mond to Iraq).

=== 1930s ===
the Party's old flag

In 1929, a sharp decline in international commodity prices caused a more than 40 percent drop in the value of Iraqi exports. This led to a national economic depression and massive wage reductions for many of Iraq's workers. It was at this time that Communist circles began growing among young men in Basra (led by Ghali Zuwayyid) and Nasiriyyah (led by Yusuf Salman Yusuf, "Comrade Fahd"). Several circles were also growing in Baghdad, led by such notables as Asim Flayyeh, Mahdi Hashim, and Zaki Khairi. These young men had first met during the student demonstrations of 1927 and 1928. These groups were brought together through the boycott of the British-owned Baghdad Electric Light Company, lasting from 5 December 1933 until 2 January 1934. Finally, on 8 March 1935, Jamiyyat Dudd Al-Istimar ("The Association Against Colonialism") was founded. Three days later a manifesto was issued, calling for the unification of all workers and peasants and demanding cancellation of debts, redistribution of lands, and extensions of worker's rights, including an eight-hour day. The organization, with its founders acting as regional leaders, set about publishing Iraq's first underground paper, Kifah Al-Shab ("The Struggle of the People"), and began attacking prime minister Yasin al-Hashimi, resulting in swift police crackdown and the arrests of almost all of the major leaders. By December 1935, the paper ceased to exist, having reached a circulation of about 500.

After the coup of 29 October 1936, the Iraqi Communist leaders and organizers who had eluded imprisonment helped to lead the wave of peaceful demonstrations occurring across the country, such as Ghali Zuwayyid in Basra. The party found supporters on the "Committee for National and Progressive Reform" (which organized popular support in Baghdad) and even secured two supporters in the newly elected parliament. Bakr Sidqi, the leader of the coup and now the new power in the government, quickly issued attacks on the party, and was met with labor strikes across the nation. Sidqi responded with further crackdowns, and many of the Communist reformers fled the cause. Despite the assassination of Sidqi in 1937, the damage had been done, leaving the leadership of the party in the hands of Zaki Khairi, who sought new support for the party among the lower ranks of the military throughout the late 1930s.

The Iraqi Communist Party stood firmly against antisemitism and was wary of fascist trends among right-wing parties.

=== 1940s ===
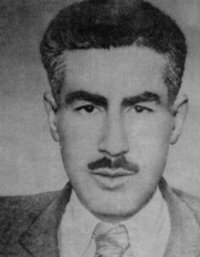
Yusuf Salman Yusuf, the secretary-general of the Iraqi Communist Party at the time

World War II posed a difficult predicament for the ICP, who looked to the Soviet Union for guidance but also vehemently opposed supporting the British Empire, whose occupation of Iraq after the 1941 Anglo-Iraqi War was partially premised on keeping supply lines open to the Soviets. After Nazi Germany launched an invasion of the Soviet Union in 1941, the ICP hesitated to officially lend their support to either side. While their ideological allies were the Soviet Union, the Soviets were allied with the British, and the Germans also had significant influence in Iraq during the time of the Ottoman Empire. The party eventually decided to support the Allies in May 1942, which essentially aligned them with the Iraqi monarchy and the landowners for the time being.

In 1941, Yusuf Salman Yusuf became secretary-general of the party, and set about revamping the organization and expanding membership among the working classes. He successfully laid the basis for the mass party of later years, and under his leadership the party became a considerable force among the Iraqi working class and a major focus for protest against British involvement in Iraqi affairs. In 1942 some of his decisions fell under criticism, and eventually split the party into several factions, each with their own newspaper. In 1944 the party launched a clandestine campaign to organize the nation's industrial workers, spearheaded by lower middle class intellectuals. This led to a party conference in March 1944 and eventually to the party's first congress in 1945, at which the dissidents of 1942 were reinstated into the party ranks.

Anti-British sentiment came back into the forefront of party concerns in April 1945, as the cost of living in the country grew higher and higher. The party attacked the Iraqi government with criticisms and outright condemnations after the killing of protestors in June and July 1946, and as a result Fahd was arrested and sentenced to death, later reduced to life in prison. Between 1944 and 1946, major percentages (30-60%) of oil and railway workers, along with port workers in Basra, were unionized, all with ICP members as union leaders. As a result, massive strikes were organized between 1945 and 1947, demanding wage increases and the legalization of union organizations. The government initially granted wage increases, but soon dismantled the unions and arrested their leaders, contributing to Al-Wathbah, a period of urban unrest in Baghdad, beginning in January 1948. Another major issue for the party at this time was the Palestinian Question. Despite earlier support of Palestinian rights of self-determination, in July 1948 the party fell in line with Moscow's position of supporting a Zionist state. The party lost many supporters among the public because of this, and many members also resigned and left the party ranks in anger.

While this period brought many organizational victories for the party, it also brought devastating response from the government, due to the party's role in the al-Wathbah uprisings. Fahd and two fellow ICP members were publicly hanged in 1949, after being accused of organizing agitation from prison. The party was nearly decimated, and a period of reconstruction was to follow.

=== 1950–1958 ===
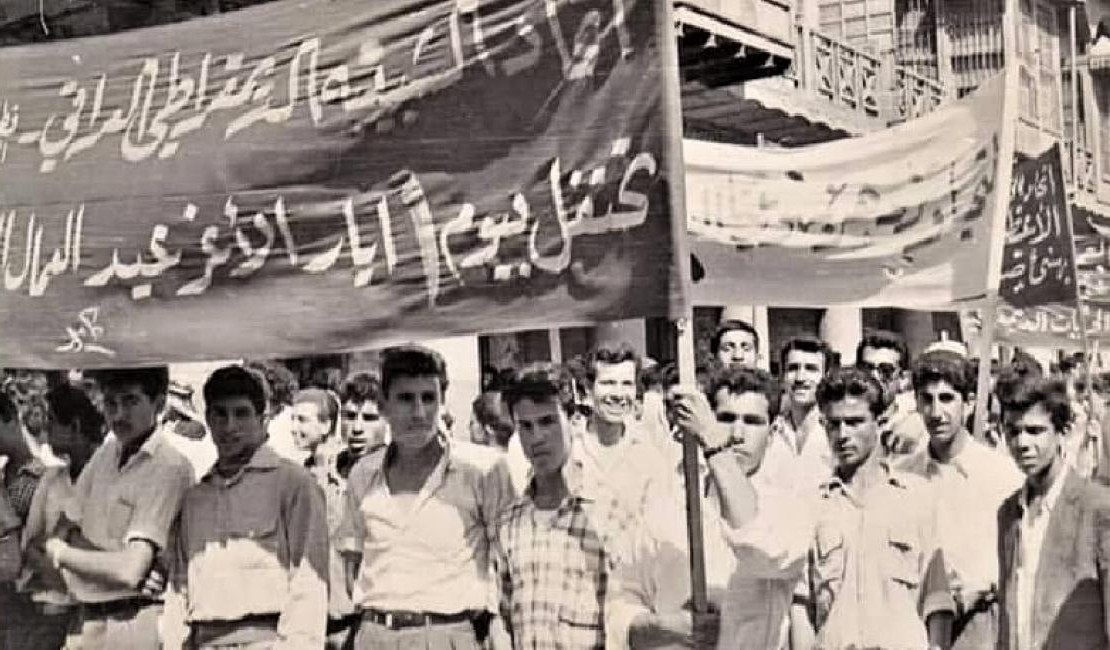
Party demonstrations at the May Day

After the devastations of the late 40s, the composition of the party went through some serious changes. The severely weakened organization was carried through the early 50s by growing Kurdish support and for the period 1949-1950 the party was actually led from Kurdistan instead of Baghdad. Nearly the entirety of the old, largely Baghdadi leadership had been imprisoned, including communist leaders like Krikor Badrossian, and the Kurdish members quickly filled the resulting void. This period also saw a drastic drop in Jewish membership, undoubtedly connected to Operation Ezra and Nehemiah, the massive exodus of approximately 120,000 Jews from Iraq at this time. Between 1952 and 1954 a series of uprisings led to the establishment of martial law, the outlawing of all political parties, cultural circles, unions, and independent media, and the arrests of their leaders. This policy was instituted during one of Nuri al-Said's many periods of control over the government. The ICP, which had always been an illegal organization, adopted a new national charter in 1953 which differed from the 1944 charter in that it accepted possible secession of the Kurdish people. At this time, according to one source, the party numbered about 500. Riots over prison conditions broke out in June and September 1953, first in Baghdad and then in Kut, resulting in the deaths of many Communist political prisoners at the hands of the police. This caused a national outcry and won many sympathizers to the side of the Communist cause. At the second party Congress in 1956, the party officially adopted a pan–Arabist stance. This was inspired not only by the arms agreement between Egypt and the USSR in July 1955, but also by Egypt's nationalization of the Suez Canal the following year, resulting in an Anglo–French-Israeli attack on Egypt. This pro-Nasserist stance would eventually become a point of conflict after the 1958 revolution. In 1958, the party supported the revolution and the new government of Abdul-Karim Qasim, who relied to a considerable degree on its support.

=== The party under Qasim, 1958–1963 ===
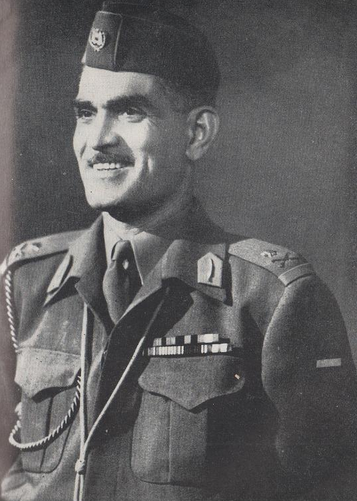
Abdul-Karim Qasim (The Leader)

The relationship between the party and Abdul-Karim Qasim was positive. After the monarchy was overthrown, ICP's Naziha al-Dulaimi was picked by Qasim as Minister of Municipalities in the 1959 cabinet as the sole representative of the ICP in his republican government. She was the first woman minister in Iraq's modern history and the first woman cabinet minister in the Arab world. Qasim was supported in his investiture as Prime Minister in part by the Communist Party (who he had earlier lifted a ban on), giving several ranks to them and establishing slightly improved relations with the Soviet Union.

=== The party under Ba'athist rule ===
The Ba'athist coup of 8 February 1963 was accompanied by street fighting as Communist activists and supporters resisted the coup attempt. Fighting in Baghdad continued for three days, concentrated in the party's strongholds. When the Baath consolidated its power the ICP suffered an unprecedented campaign of suppression. Leading figures and cadres of the Party killed, including Husain al-Radi. The total number of communists killed is unknown, but was certainly in the dozens.

In the mid-1960s, the U.S. State Department estimated the party membership to be approximately 15,000 (0.47% of the working age population of the country).

In 1967, Aziz al-Hajj split from the ICP, establishing the Iraqi Communist Party – Central Command, and initiated an armed struggle, which the ICP at the time opposed.

In 1973, ICP secretary Aziz Muhammad signed a National Action Pact with Iraqi President Ahmed Hassan al-Bakr, forming a National Progressive Front together with the Ba'ath Party. The ICP was permitted to operate legally, publish and revive its flanking organisations. Alexei Kosygin's visit forced the Iraqi Communist Party (ICP) to improve its relations with the Ba'ath Party; two ICP members, including Mukarram Talabani, were given cabinet positions and repression of the ICP ended. However, this was coupled with elements of repression, and by the autumn of 1974 the party tried to increase its security through a more clandestine mode of operation. In 1978 Saddam Hussein unleashed a renewed campaign of repression against the party, including the execution of large numbers of party members. In 1979, the party broke ties with the Iraqi government.

At the fifth national conference in 1993, the party voted to abandon Democratic centralism, Revolutionary socialism, and Marxism–Leninism. Opting instead for Reformism and identifying the party as Marxist.

In 1993, the Kurdish branch of the party was transformed into a semi-autonomous party, the Communist Party of Kurdistan – Iraq.

=== After the American occupation of Iraq ===
The Iraqi Communist Party opposed the US invasion of Iraq in 2003 but decided to work with the new political institutions established after the occupation. Its secretary, Hamid Majid Mousa, accepted a position on the Iraqi Governing Council. The party was the principal component of the People's Union list for the general election on 30 January 2005 (see January 2005 Iraqi parliamentary election) but filed separate lists in some governorate council elections (see for instance 2005 Nineveh governorate election). For the December 2005 Iraqi parliamentary election, the party has joined the Iraqi National List of Ayad Allawi, along with other socialist, secular, moderate Sunni and moderate Shiite parties.

For the 2018 general election, the Communist Party would be in the Alliance Towards Reforms, which made significant gains. A communist woman representing the alliance, Suhad al-Khateeb, was also elected in the elections to represent the city of Najaf, deemed to be one of the holiest religious and conservative cities in Iraq. Al-Khateeb, who is a teacher and an anti-poverty and women's rights activist, said upon her victory "the Communist party have a long history of honesty – we were not agents for foreign occupations. We want social justice, citizenship, and are against sectarianism, and this is also what Iraqis want."

=== 2019–present ===
The party was supportive of the 2019–2021 Iraqi protests and boycotted the 2021 Iraqi parliamentary elections, stating:

In light of the deepening political and social crisis in the country, with the dominant forces monopolizing political power and imposing their control over the country’s destinies and the direction of social development, the widespread corruption and the lack of prosecution for the most corrupt, the assassinations, kidnappings and intimidation, in addition to the deterioration of the living conditions of the people, especially the working people, due to the increase in poverty and unemployment, and the absence of basic services... Under these complex conditions, laden with crises and risks, talk of providing an atmosphere conducive to holding free and fair elections has become nothing but an illusion exposed by the tragic daily realities and the bitter suffering of millions. Based on this, we announced in the statement issued by the party’s Central Committee on 9th May 2021, the suspension of our participation in the elections in October.

In May 2025, the Iraqi Communist Party was one of 13 political groups that formed a new electoral alliance, The Alternative Alliance (Albadil Alliance), aiming to introduce a civil and reform-driven platform ahead of the November Parliamentary Elections.

== Party institution and symbols ==
Alternate logo, used alongside the party's original logo since 2017

The party newspaper is Tariq ash-Shaab (Path of the People). It also publishes the magazine Al-Thakafa Al-Jedida (The New Culture). The youth wing of the party is the Iraqi Democratic Youth Federation. The motto of the party is "a free homeland and a happy people" (Arabic: وطن حر وشعب سعيد watanun hurrun wa sha'bun sa'id).

== Leadership list ==
The following is a list of persons who served as Secretary or First Secretary of the Iraqi Communist Party, the party's primary leadership position. Given the occasional suppression of the party and resultant lapses in its activity, the position was at times vacant.

No.	Name	Assumed Position	Left Position	Ethnicity
1	Amin Flayyeh	May 1935	December 1935	
2	Abdullah Mas'ud	1941	October 1941	
3	Yusuf Salman Yusuf (Comrade Fahd)	October 1941	February 1949	Assyrian
4	Baha' al-Din Nuri	September 1949 (effectively, officially appointed only in August 1951)	April 1953	Kurdish
5	Abd al-Karim Ahmad al-Daud	April 1953	June 1954	Arab
6	Hamid Uthman	June 1954	June 1955	Kurdish
7	Husain al-Radi (Salam 'Adil)	June 1955	February 1963	Arab
8	Aziz Muhammad	August 1964	1993	Kurdish
9	Hamid Majid Mousa	1993	2016	Arab
10	Raid Fahmi (Abu Rawa)	December 2016	current	Arab

== Election results ==
Election year	# of overall votes	% of overall vote	# of overall seats won	+/–	Government
Jan 2005	69,920	(#7) 0,83%	2 / 275	New	Opposition
Dec 2005	977,325	(#4) 8,02%	1 / 275	▼1	Government under affiliation with Iraqi National List
2010	–	–	–	▼1	Extra-parliamentary
2014	12.626	0,10%	1 / 328	▲1	In opposition as part of Civil Democratic Alliance
2018	1,500,862	(#1) 14,38%	2 / 329	▲1	Government under affiliation with Alliance towards Reforms (Saairun)
2021	Boycotted		0 / 329	▼2	Extra-parliamentary
2025	71,697	0,64%	0 / 329	Steady	Extra-parliamentary as part of Albadil Alliance

== See also ==
- Al-Ansar (Iraq)
- Ar-Rashid revolt
- Co-ordinating Committee of Communist Parties in Britain
- Fahd's Revolutionary Organization
- Rayat ash-Shaghilah
- Yusuf Salman Yusuf
- Communist Action Organization in Iraq
- Leninist Group in the Iraqi Communist Movement
- Voice of the Iraqi People
