= List of Iraqis =

- Flag of Iraq
- جمهورية العراق; Republic of Iraq
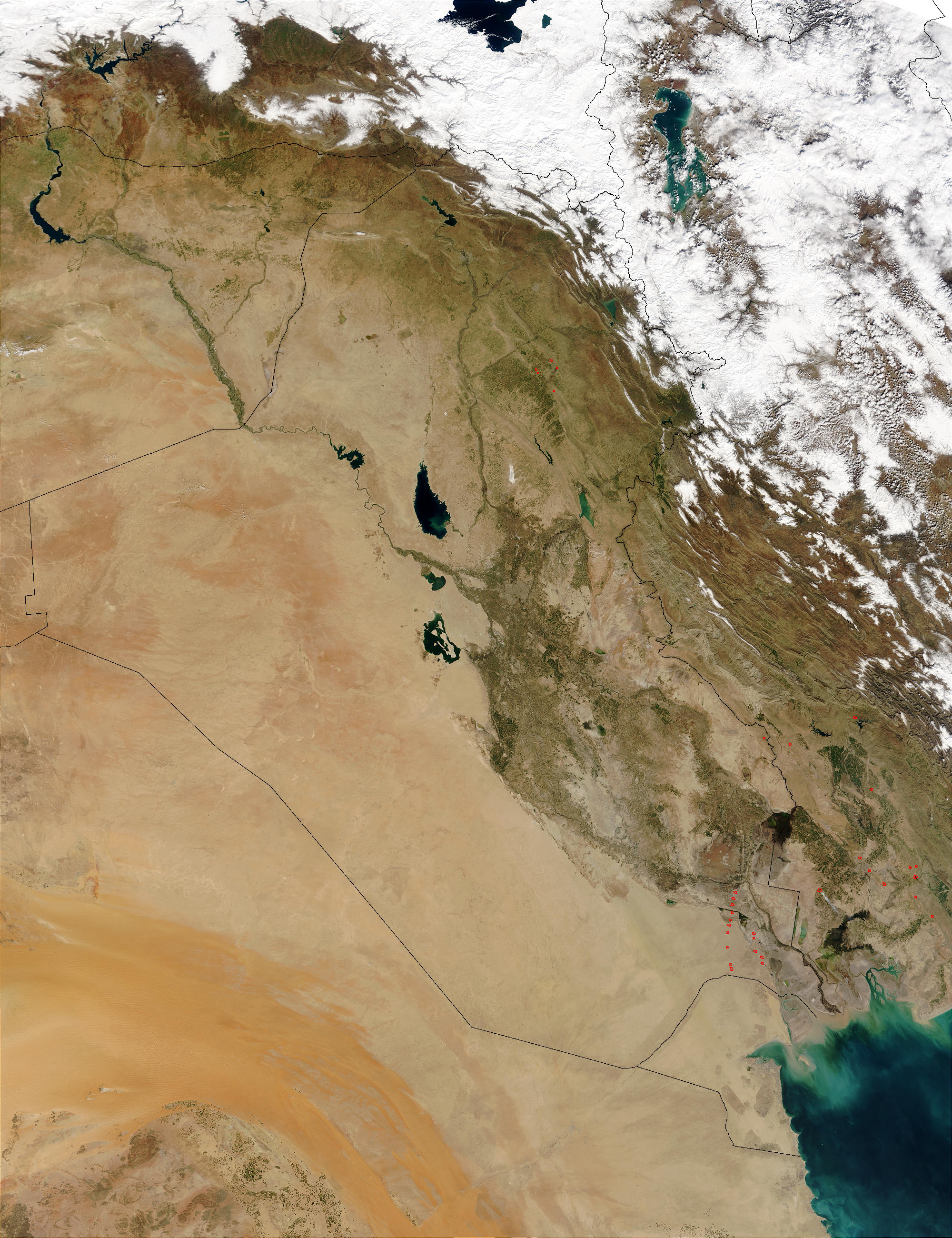

This list of Iraqis includes people who were born in Iraq and people who are of Iraqi ancestry, who are significantly notable for their life and/or work.

== Archaeologists ==
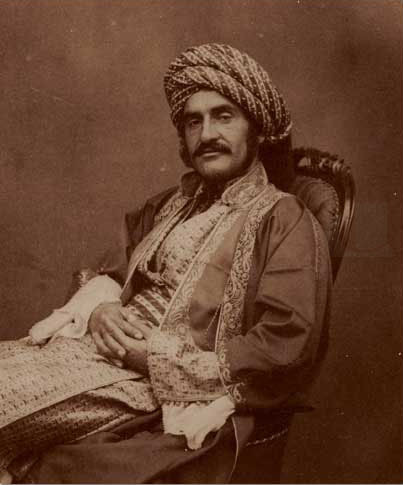
Hormuzd Rassam

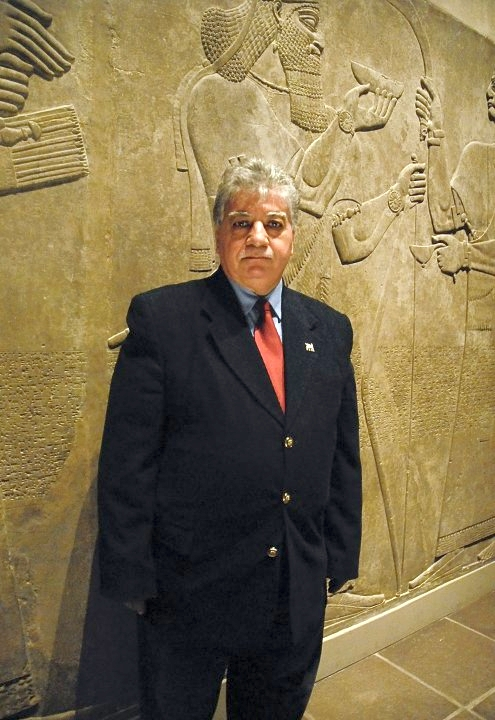
Donny George

- Donny George Youkhanna
- Taha Baqir
- Zainab Bahrani (born 1962), Iraqi professor of Ancient Near Eastern Art and Archaeology at Columbia University
- Hormuzd Rassam (1826 – 16 September 1910), native Assyrian Assyriologist, British diplomat and traveller who made a number of important discoveries, including the clay tablets that contained the Epic of Gilgamesh, the world's oldest literature

== Artists ==
- Wijdan Ali, painter, was born in Baghdad, Iraq. She is the ex-wife of Prince 'Ali bin Naif of Jordan.
- Mohammed Ghani Hikmat (1929 – September 12, 2011), Iraqi sculptor and artist credited with creating some of Baghdad's highest profile sculptures and monuments. His best known works include the Victory Arch and two statues of Queen Scheherazade and King Shahryar, located on Aby Nuwas Street.
- Jananne Al-Ani, artist
- Zahroun Amara, world renowned Mandaean niello silversmith. People that are known to have owned his silver nielloware include Stanley Maude, Winston Churchill, Bahrain royal family, Egyptian King Farouk, Iraqi royal family including kings Faisal I and Ghazi, and British royal family including the Prince of Wales who became Edward VIII.
- Layla Al-Attar, painter
- Wesaam Al-Badry, Iraqi-American artist and photojournalist
- Yitzhak Yamin, Israeli painter and sculptor, (born in Iraq of Iraqi Jewish heritage)
- Suad al-Attar, painter
- Jawad Saleem (1919–1961) (Arabic: جواد سليم), Iraqi sculptor born in Ankara (Turkey) in 1919, one of the most famous Iraqi artists of all time.
- Omran Al-Kaysi, artist and historian
- Sama Raena Alshaibi, artist
- Jaber Alwan, artist
- Jasim An-Najafi (born 1950) (Arabic: جاسم النجفي), Iraqi senior calligrapher born in Najaf, Iraq
- Khalil al-Zahawi, calligrapher
- Halla Ayla, Iraqi-American artist
- Raad Ghantous, interior designer
- Hayv Kahraman, Iraqi-American artist
- Farouk Kaspaules, Iraqi-born Canadian artist
- Toba Khedoori, artist
- Nedim Kufi, artist
- Hassan Massoudy, calligrapher
- Rashad Salim, Iraqi-German artist
- Tamara Salman, design director
- Wafaa Bilal, born in 1966 Najaf, Iraq. He is an Iraqi American artist, former professor at the School of the Art Institute of Chicago and currently an assistant professor at the Tisch School of the Arts at New York University.

=== Artists of Iraqi origin ===
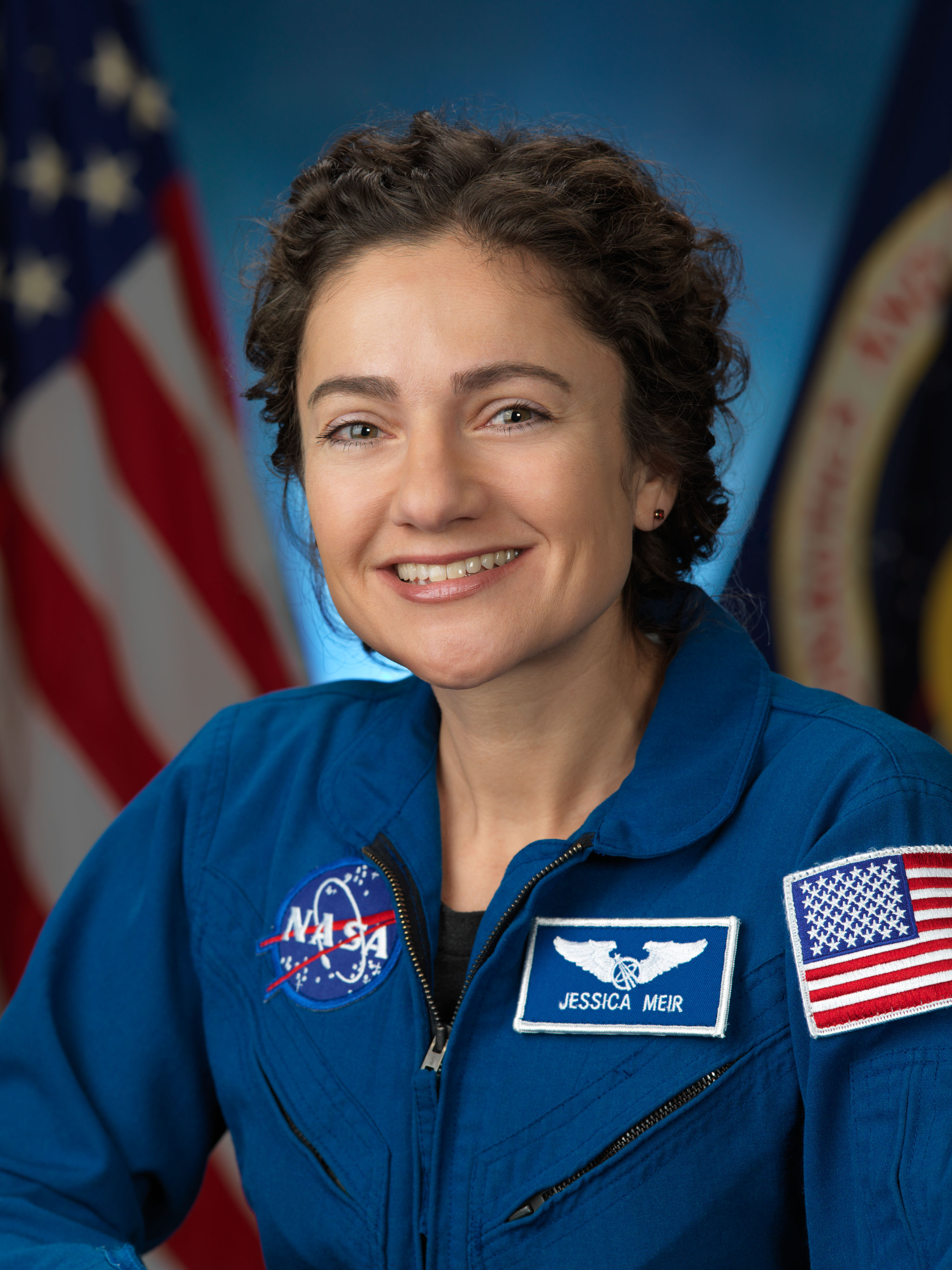
Jessica Meir

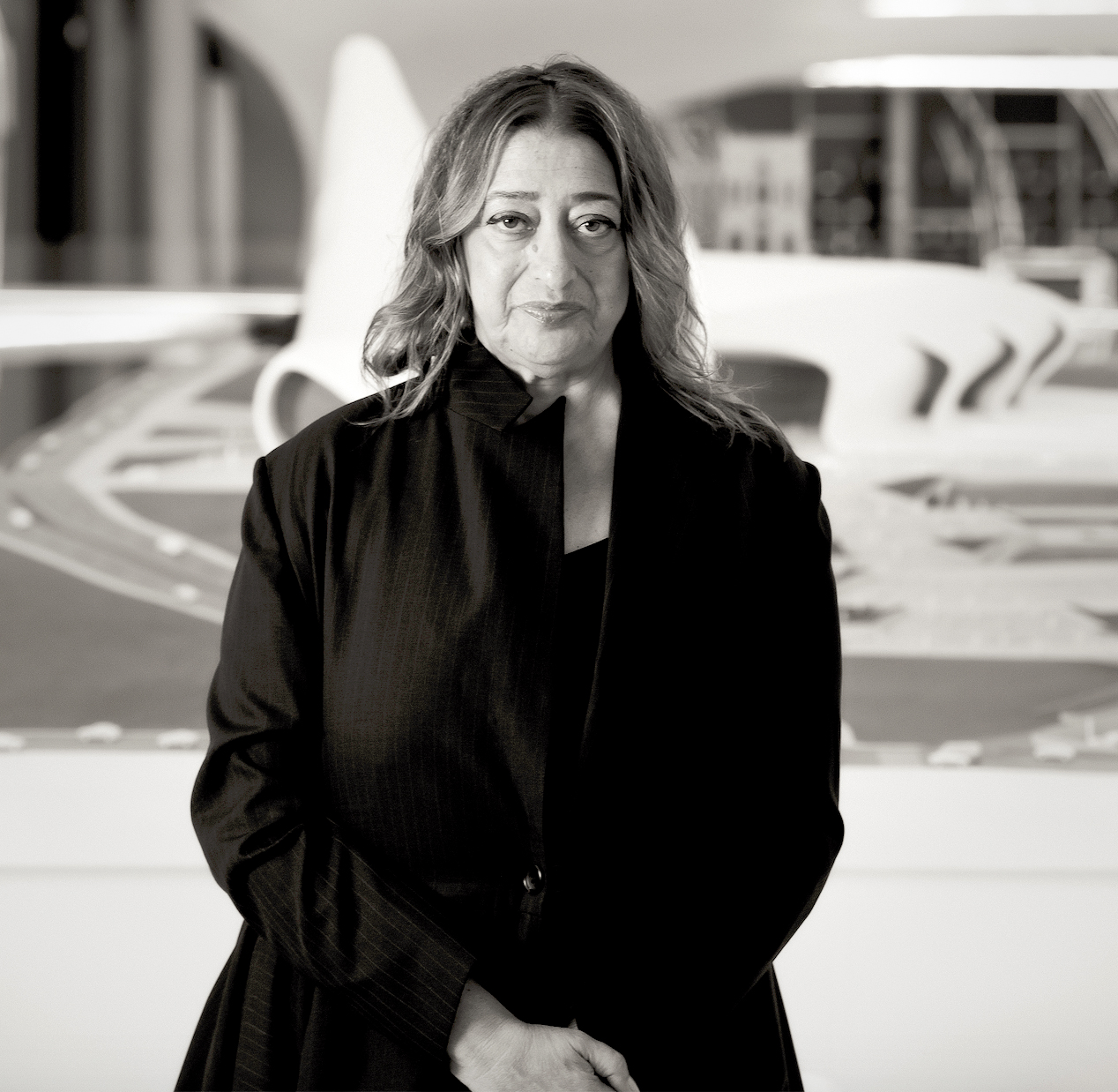
Zaha Hadid

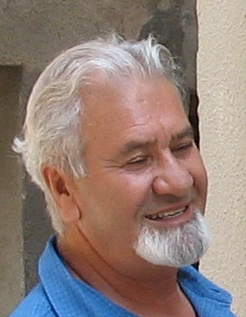
Yitzhak Yamin

- Anish Kapoor (born 12 March 1954), Indian sculptor. Born in Bombay to Hindu father and a Jewish mother whose family immigrated from Baghdad when she was a few months old.
- Gerry Judah (born 30 July 1951), British artist and designer. Judah's maternal and paternal grandparents came from Baghdad to settle in the already established Baghdadi Jewish community in India and Burma.

== Architects ==
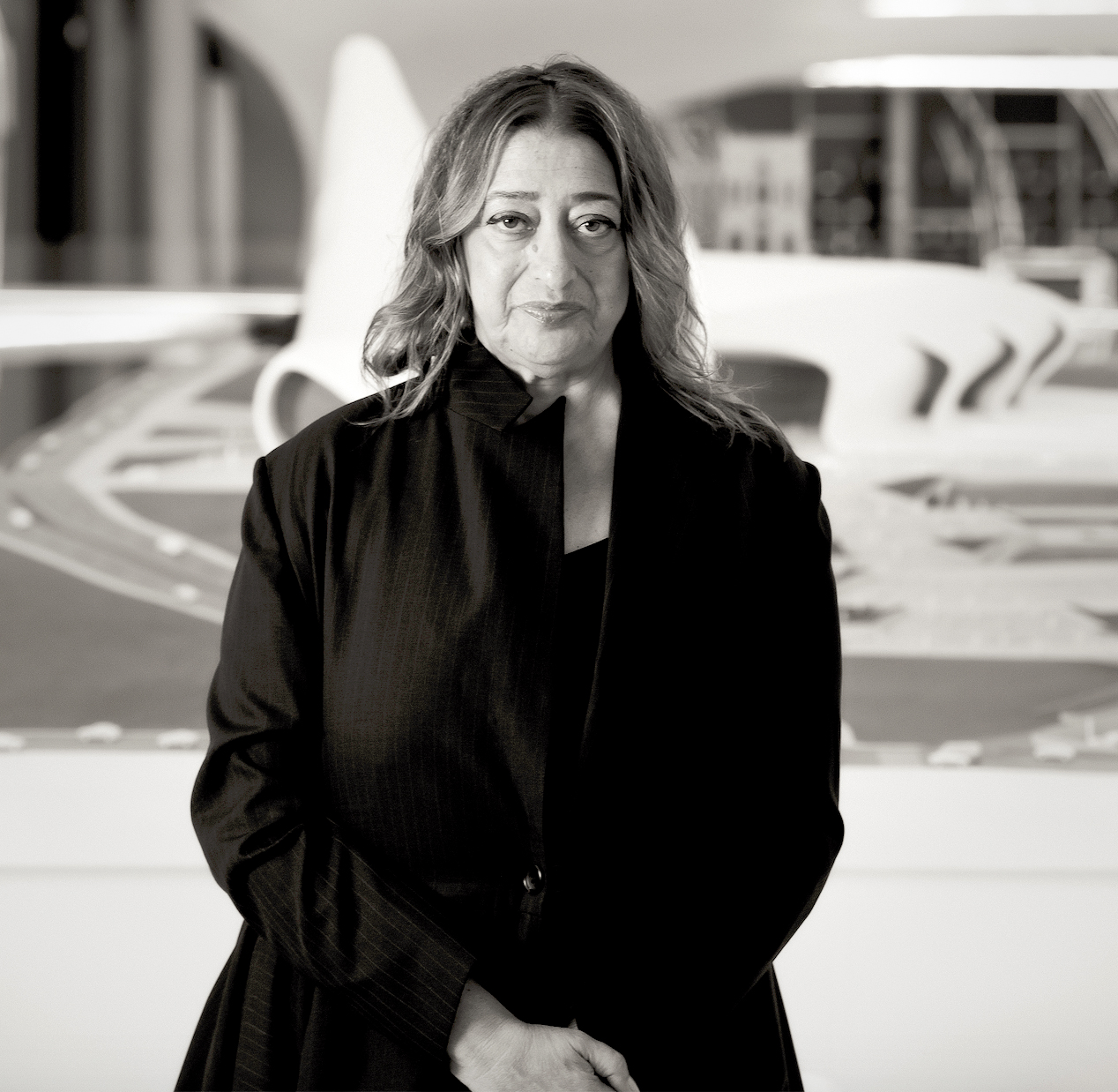
Zaha Hadid

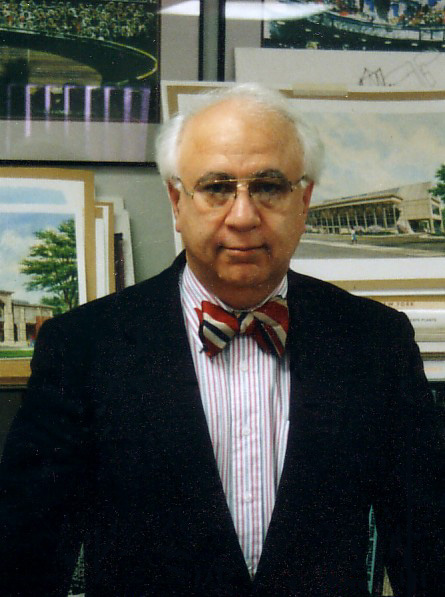
Hisham N. Ashkouri

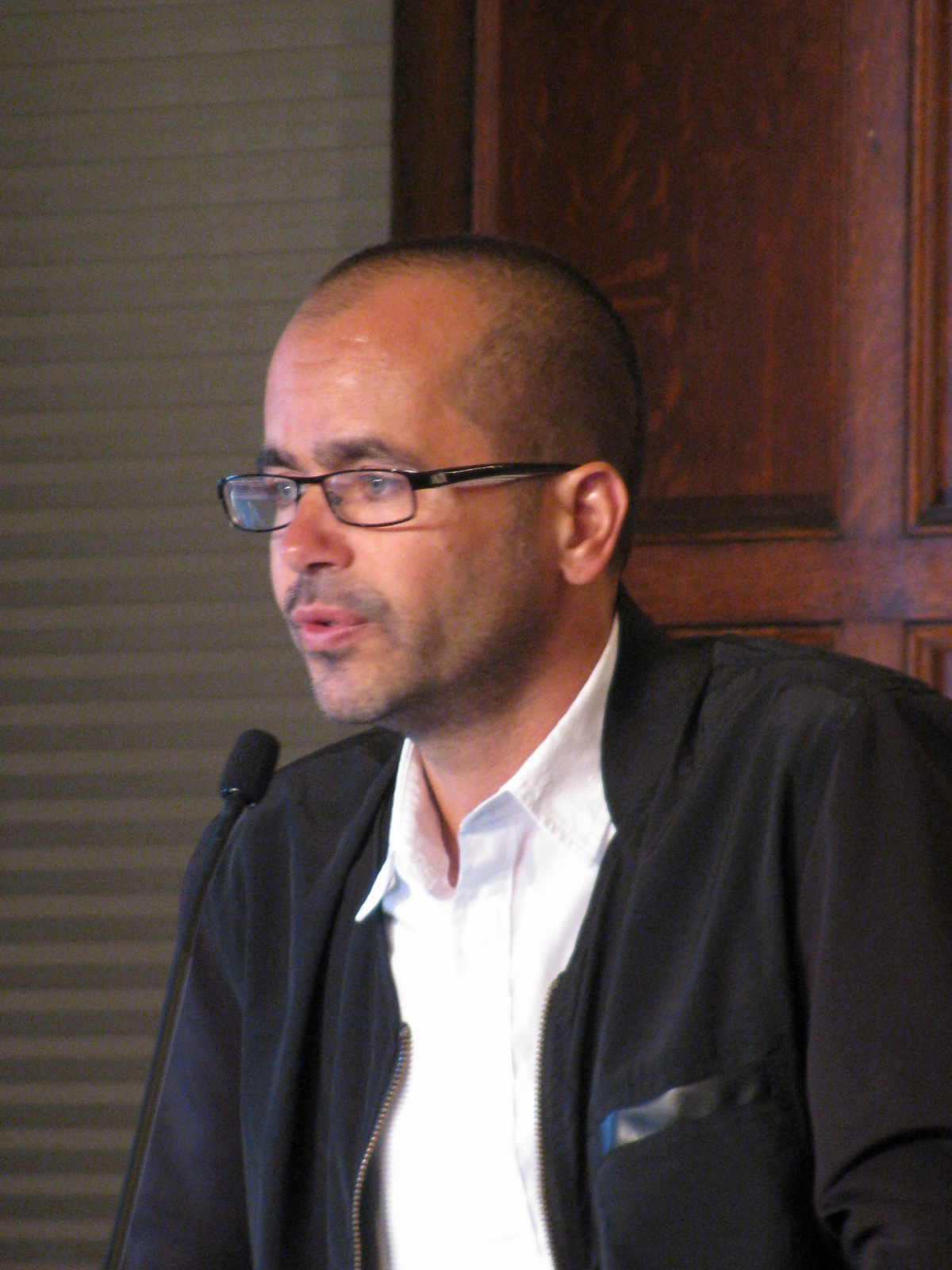
Wafaa Bilal

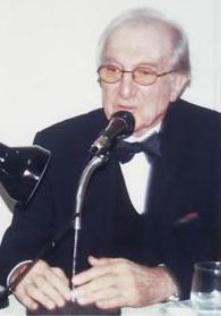
Rifat Chadirji

- Hisham N. Ashkouri
- Rifat Chadirji (1926–2020), Iraqi architect and author
- Zaha Hadid, one of the greatest architects in the 20th and 21st century, first woman ever to receive Pritzker Architecture Prize (2004). Other awards include Thomas Jefferson Medal in Architecture (2007), and Brit Awards 2017 posthumously.
- Hussain Ali Abbass Harba, Iraqi architect and designer
- Jala Makhzoumi (born 1949), landscape architect, academic and activist
- Kanan Makiya (born 1949), architect, academic and critic
- Mohamed Makiya (1914–2015), architect, urban planner and author
- Shwan Alhashimi (1977), Architect, Interior Architect and Futurist
- Manhal Al-Habbobi (born 1970), Iraqi architect and former mayor of Baghdad
- Basil Bayati, architect and designer

=== Fashion designers ===
- Misha Nonoo, American-based fashion designer, best known for her eponymous line of women's ready-to-wear
- Farah Alhaddad, Iraqi-born fashion model
- Reem Alasadi, Iraqi-born British fashion designer
- Salim al-Shimiri
- Hana Sadiq
- Amir Slama, fashion designer, stylist and owner of the famous beach fashion brand Rosa Chá in Brazil
- Zeena Zaki, fashion designer

== Authors ==
- Elaf Ali: Journalist and author known for her impactful memoir Who Said Anything About Love?, which explores growing up under honor-based norms in Sweden.
- Nazik Al-Malaika: A revolutionary female poet who was one of the first to use free verse in Arabic literature.
- Sinan Antoon: A professor at NYU and a leading novelist who writes deeply emotional stories about loss and memory. His most famous works include The Corpse Washer and The Book of Collateral Damage.
- Ali Bader: A prolific novelist known for exploring the intellectual history of Baghdad and the complexities of Iraqi identity.
- Hassan Blasim: Often called "the best living Arab writer" by Western critics. He lives in Finland and writes gritty, surreal stories about war and refugees. Key works: The Iraqi Christ, The Madman of Freedom Square, Allah99.
- Inaam Kachachi: A Paris-based author whose novels often deal with the Iraqi diaspora and the loss of the diverse old Iraq. Her notable books include The American Granddaughter and Tashari.
- Betool Khedairi: Her writing often focuses on the intersection of cultures and the lives of women in Baghdad. Gained international acclaim for her debut novel Sky Below, which captures life in Baghdad under sanctions.
- Abbas Khider: An Iraqi-German author who fled Iraq in the 90s. He writes primarily in German about the refugee experience.
- Dunya Mikhail: An Iraqi-American renowned poet and journalist. Her work often transforms the horrors of war into hauntingly beautiful metaphors.
- Ahmed Saadawi: Best known for the international bestseller Frankenstein in Baghdad, which won the International Prize for Arabic Fiction.
- Badr Shakir al-Sayyab: Widely considered the father of modern Arabic poetry for his role in breaking traditional poetic structures (notably with his poem Rain Song).
- Muhsin al-Ramli: Living in Spain, he is one of the most prominent novelists writing about the Saddam era and its aftermath. Key works: The President's Gardens, Fingers of Dates.
- Shahad Al Rawi: A younger voice whose debut novel became an international sensation. Key works: The Baghdad Clock.
- Saadi Youssef: One of the most prolific and influential Arab poets of the late 20th century, known for his "everyday" poetic language.
- Haifa Zangana: A novelist, artist, and political activist known for her memoirs and novels about political resistance.

== Business people and entrepreneurs ==
- Asil Attar, Iraqi businesswoman and former CEO
- Nadhmi Auchi, British-Iraqi businessman, founder and chairman of General Mediterranean Holding (GMH), a conglomerate of 120 companies worldwide. In the Sunday Times Rich List 2008 ranking of the wealthiest people in the UK he was placed 27th with estimated fortune of £2,150 million.
- Zadik Bino (born 1943), Iraqi-born Israeli billionaire businessman.
- Shlomo Eliahu (born 1936), Baghdad-born Israeli businessman, billionaire, and former member of the Knesset
- Calouste Gulbenkian (23 March 1869 – 20 July 1955), Armenian businessman and philanthropist.
- Huda Kattan, Iraqi-American, founder and CEO of Huda Beauty
- Nemir Kirdar, Iraqi-born businessman (President, founder and CEO of Investcorp)
- Khalid Muhmood, director of Apollo Education and Training
- Sharif Hikmat Nashashibi, co-founder and chairman of Arab Media Watch
- Samuel Nalo, businessman, hijacker, and burglar
- Selim Zilkha, entrepreneur, founder of Mothercare, one of the United Kingdom's largest retail chains.
- Ezra Zilkha, financier and philanthropist
- Bahaa Abdul Hadi, Iraqi businessman and founder of Qi Card, the national credit card of Iraq also known as the International Smart Card ISC.
- Dadvan Yousuf, Iraqi cryptocurrency investor and businessman whose early bitcoin investments made him a millionaire.

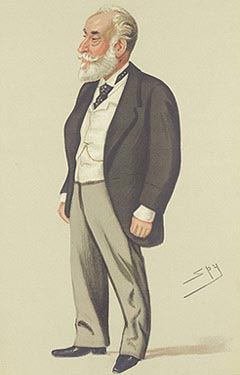
Albert Abdullah David Sassoon

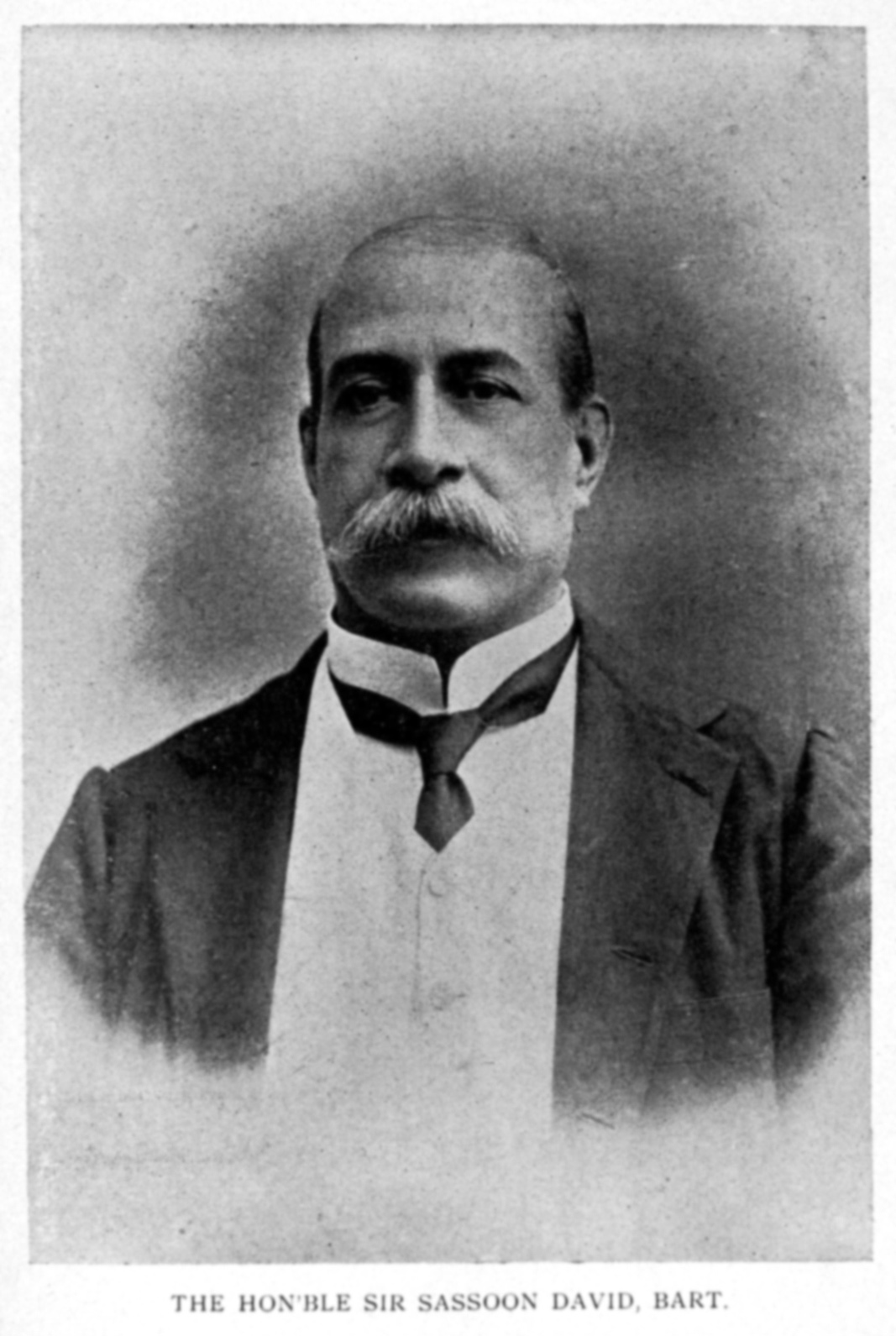
Sir Sassoon David, 1st Baronet

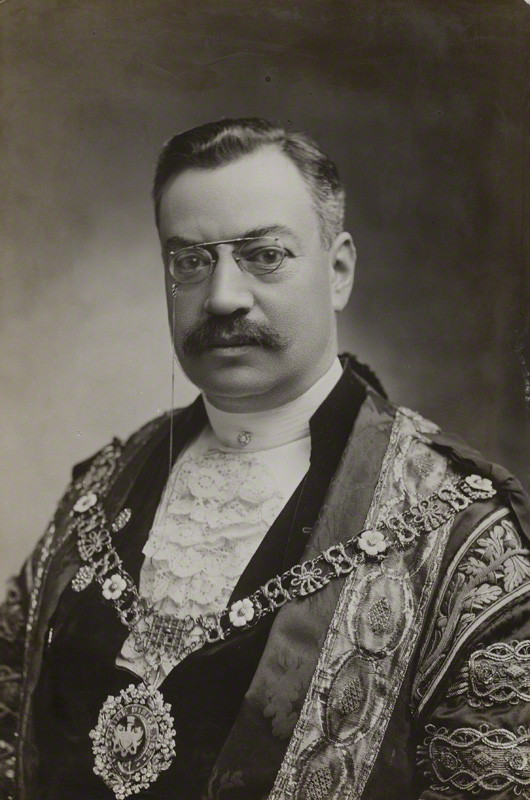
Marcus Samuel, 1st Viscount Bearsted

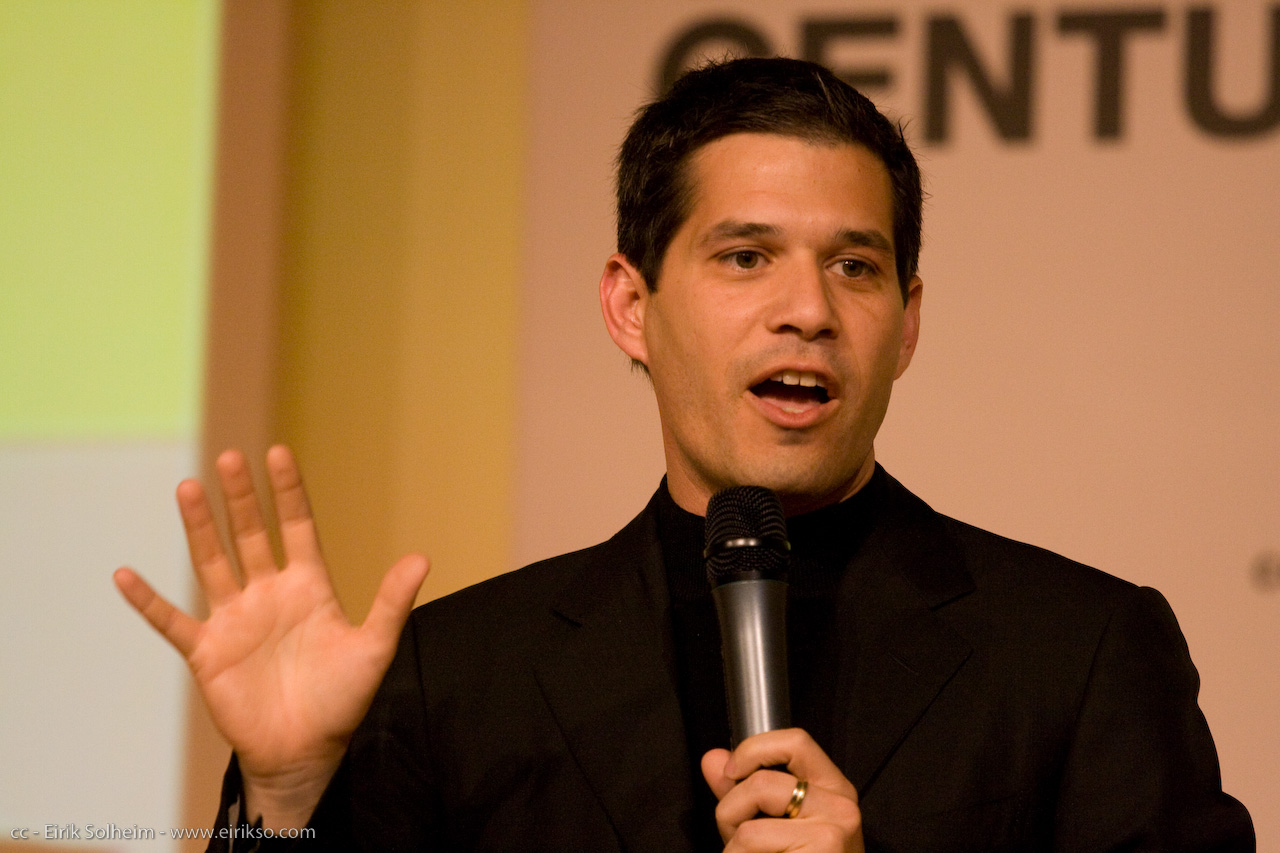
Shai Agassi

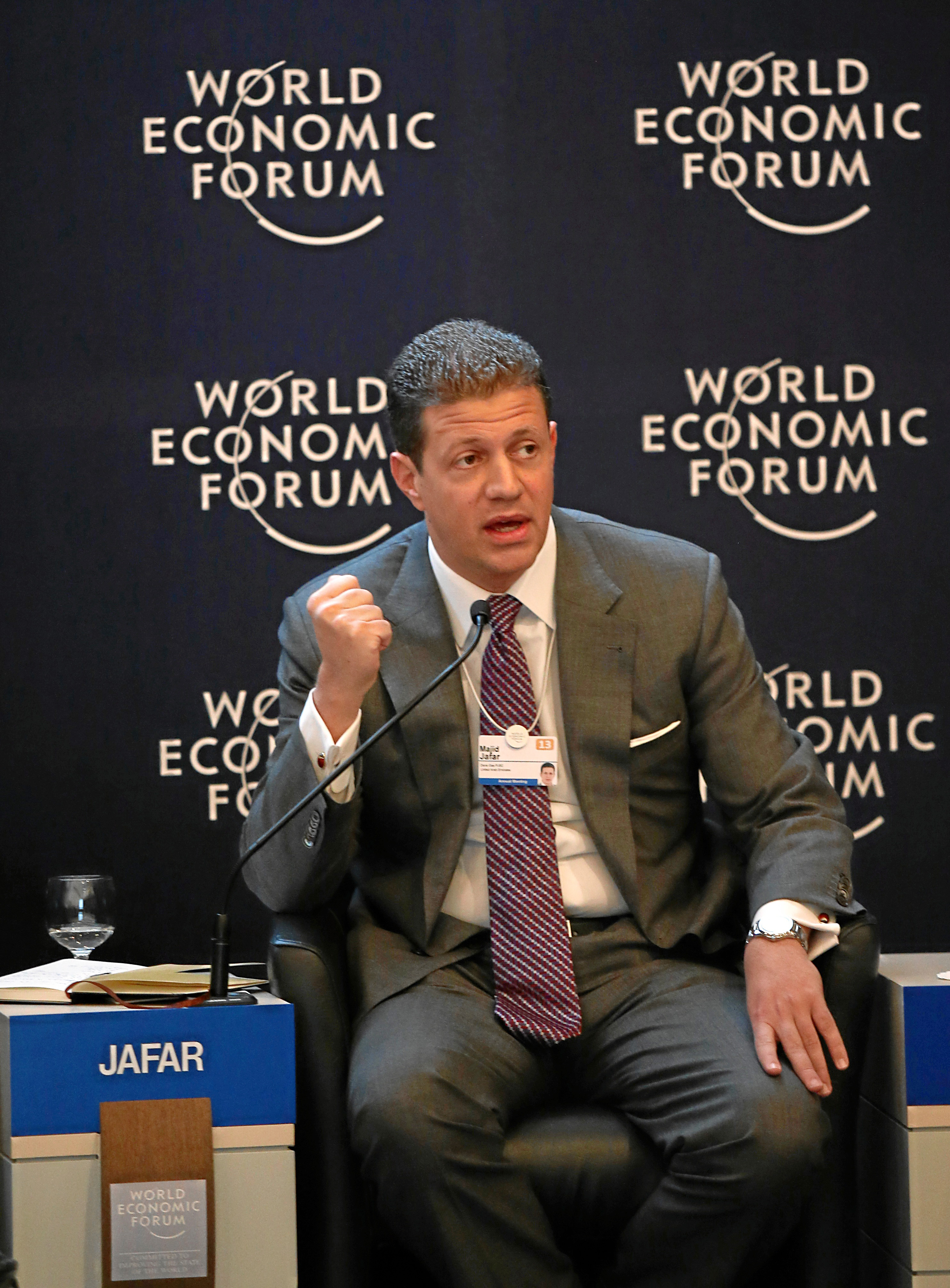
Majid Jafar

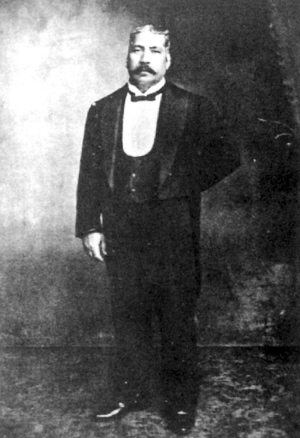
Silas Aaron Hardoon

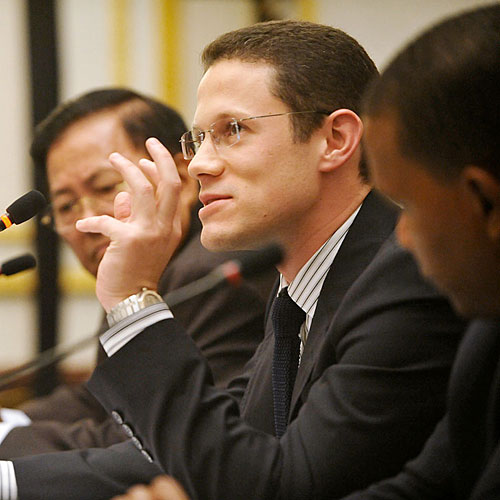
Badr Jafar

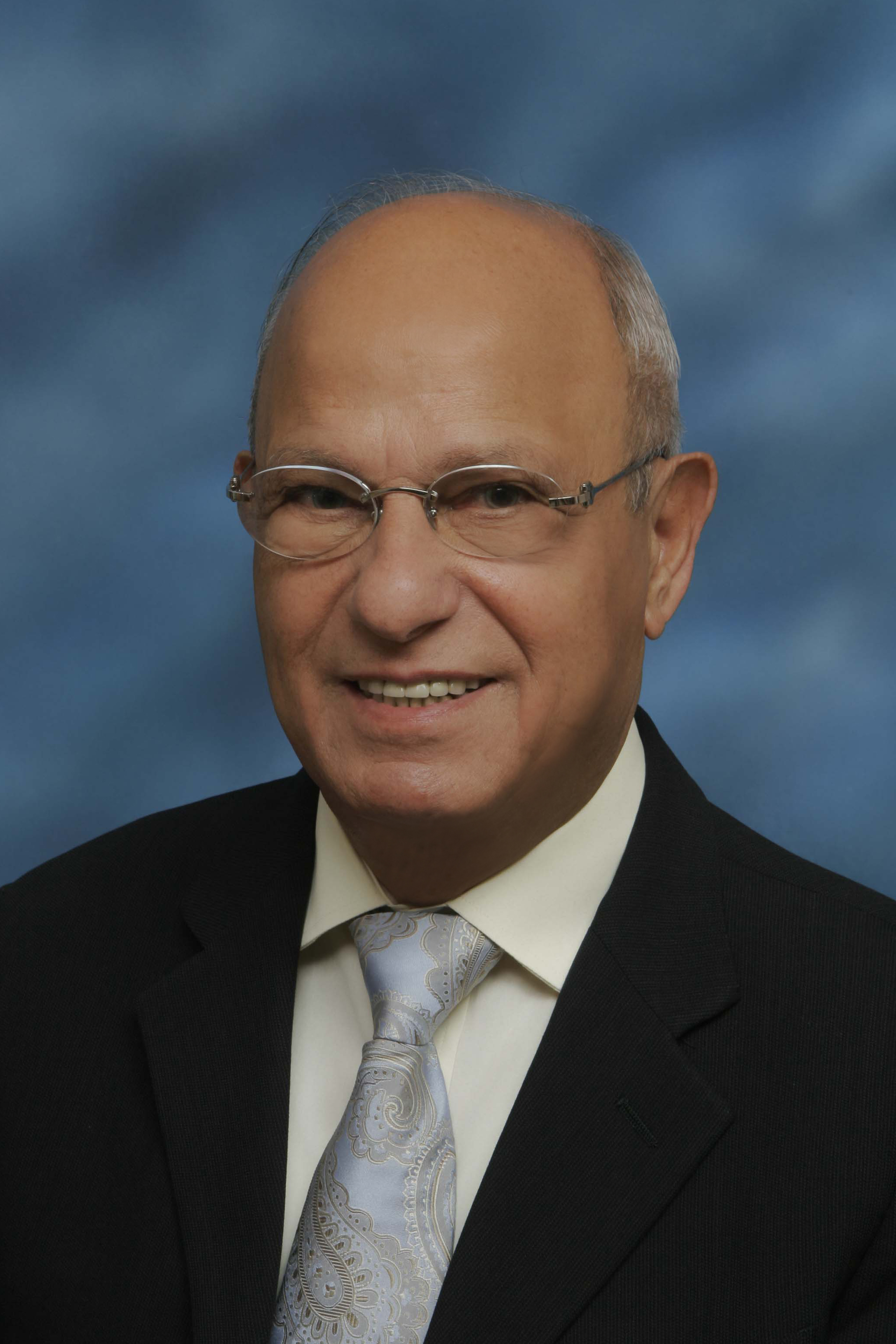
Shlomo Eliyahu

- Marcus Samuel, 1st Viscount Bearsted (5 November 1853 – 17 January 1927), founder of the Shell Transport and Trading Company, which later took the name Royal Dutch Shell. Samuel was born into a Baghdadi Jewish family in Whitechapel, London.
- Samuel Samuel (7 April 1855 – 23 October 1934), businessman and Conservative Party politician. He sat in the House of Commons from 1913 to 1934. Samuel, born into a Baghdadi Jewish family. He founded Samuel Samuel & Co in Yokohama, Japan, in partnership with his elder brother Marcus Samuel.
- Walter Samuel, 2nd Viscount Bearsted, Colonel Walter Horace Samuel, 2nd Viscount Bearsted MC (13 March 1882 – 8 November 1948) was a British peer and former Chairman of the Shell Transport and Trading Company. He was also a prominent art collector and a philanthropist. Samuel was the son of Marcus Samuel, 1st Viscount Bearsted.
- Marcus Samuel, 3rd Viscount Bearsted, Major Marcus Richard Samuel, 3rd Viscount Bearsted TD DL (1 June 1909 – 15 October 1986) was a British peer and a director of numerous companies, including Lloyds Bank. Samuel was the son of Walter Samuel, 2nd Viscount Bearsted.
- Peter Samuel, 4th Viscount Bearsted, Major Peter Montefiore Samuel, 4th Viscount Bearsted MC TD (9 December 1911 – 9 June 1996) was a British peer and former Deputy Chairman of Shell Transport and Trading.
- Sassoon David Sassoon (1832–1867), Indian-born English businessman, banker and philanthropist.
- Sir Sassoon David, 1st Baronet (11 December 1849 – 27 September 1926), member of the community of Baghdadi Jews that lived in Bombay. A prominent businessman, he was the lead promoter of the Bank of India, founded in 1906.
- Sir Edward Sassoon, 2nd Baronet, of Kensington Gore (20 June 1856 – 24 May 1912), British businessman and politician.
- Sir Percival David, 2nd Baronet (Bombay, 21 July 1892 – 9 October 1964), important collector of Chinese porcelain. The Percival David Foundation of Chinese Art is a collection of Chinese ceramics and related items in London, England.
- Naim Dangoor CBE (born April 1914), British-nationalised Jewish Iraqi refugee, engineer, entrepreneur and philanthropist.
- Jack Dellal (2 October 1923 – 28 October 2012), London-based property investor known as 'Black Jack' reportedly worth GBP £480 million in 2009.
- Zadik Bino, Israeli businessman of Iraqi Jewish descent. He was ranked Israel's 24th richest man in 2006 by Forbes.
- Albert Abdullah David Sassoon, Sir Albert Abdullah David Sassoon, 1st Baronet, KCB, CSI, (25 July 1818 – 24 October 1896) was a British Indian businessman and philanthropist. Sir Albert was born on 25 July 1818 in Baghdad.
- Shai Agassi, Founder and Chairman of Better Place
- Nemir A. Kirdar, Iraqi businessman and financier, he is the executive chairman & CEO of Investcorp, a private equity investment group operating out of New York, London and Bahrain. Kirdar currently lives in London. Kirdar was born to a Turkmen family in Kirkuk, Iraq, to a family prominent in the politics of the late Ottoman Empire and interwar Iraq.
- Shlomo Eliahu (born 18 January 1936 in Baghdad, Iraq), Israeli businessman, billionaire, and former politician who served as a member of the Knesset between 1978 and 1981.
- Selim Zilkha (born 1927), entrepreneur who founded Mothercare, one of the United Kingdom's largest retail chains. He was born in Baghdad to an Iraqi Jewish family. He is currently the co-owner of Zilkha Biomass Energy, which owns timberland and which makes pellet biofuel in Texas.
- Bahaa Hariri, businessman. Son of former Lebanese prime minister Rafik Hariri and Iraqi mother (Nidal Al-Bustani).
- Samuel Hayek, Israeli millionaire real-estate tycoon of Iraqi Jewish descent.
- Badr Jafar, business executive and entrepreneur based in the United Arab Emirates
- Victor Nacif, businessman and current Vice President of Design Business Aspects for Nissan Design America. He is of Mexican, Lebanese and Iraqi ancestry.
- Vincent Tchenguiz (born October 1956), Iranian-British entrepreneur born in Tehran to an Iraqi-Jewish family. He is the Chairman of Consensus Business Group.
- Robert Tchenguiz, British entrepreneur, securities dealer and the brother of Vincent Tchenguiz. He was born Teheran to an Iraqi-Jewish family. He is the co-chairman of Rotch Property Group.
- Ghadir Razuki, British multi-millionaire of Iraqi parents. Founder of TNT Magazine Group, with magazine and media interests in the UK, Australia, New Zealand and South Africa.
- Kevork Hovnanian (1923 – September 24, 2009), Iraqi-born Armenian-American businessman and home builder, founder of Hovnanian Enterprises in 1959. He remained the president and chief executive officer of Hovnanian Enterprises until his retirement in 1997
- Charles Saatchi (born 9 June 1943 in Baghdad), co-founder of the PR agency called M&C Saatchi. He is also known as an art collector and owner of the Saatchi Gallery.
- Michael Kadoorie, The Hon. Sir Michael David Kadoorie, GBS (born 1941, Hong Kong), business executive and philanthropist.
- Sir Albert Abdullah David Sassoon, 1st Baronet (25 July 1818 – 24 October 1896), British Indian philanthropist and merchant, born in Baghdad
- David and Simon Reuben, joint Chief Executives of Reuben Brothers, well-known British businessmen and philanthropists.
- David Sassoon, Indian merchant and banker; born at Bagdad Oct., 1792; died at Bombay Nov. 7, 1864. His father, a wealthy Mesopotamian merchant, for many years state treasurer to the Turkish governor of Baghdad
- Edward Isaac Ezra (3 January 1882 in Shanghai – 15 December 1921 in Shanghai), wealthy Jewish businessman of a Baghdadi Jewish family.
- Lawrence Kadoorie, Baron Kadoorie (2 June 1899 in Hong Kong – 25 August 1993 in Hong Kong), famous industrialist, hotelier, and philanthropist. His family were originally Iraqi Jews from Baghdad who later migrated to Bombay (Mumbai), India in the mid-eighteenth century.
- Elly Kadoorie, Eleazer Silas Kadoorie, known as Sir Elly Kadoorie (1867 – August 2, 1944), philanthropist and member of a wealthy family that had large business interests in the Far East.
- Ellis Kadoorie (1865–1922), Hong Kong businessman and philanthropist. He was a member of the wealthy Baghdadian Kadoorie family that had large business interests in the Far East.
- Silas Aaron Hardoon (1851–1931), wealthy businessman and well-known public figure in the city of Shanghai in the early 20th century.

== Comedians ==
- Brian Awadis, also known as FaZe Rug
- Ahmed Albasheer
- Remy Munasifi, also known as GoRemy
- Alia Shelesh, also known as SSSniperWolf

== Educators ==
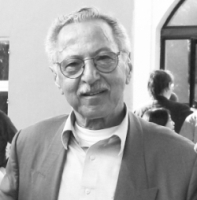
Abdul Jerri

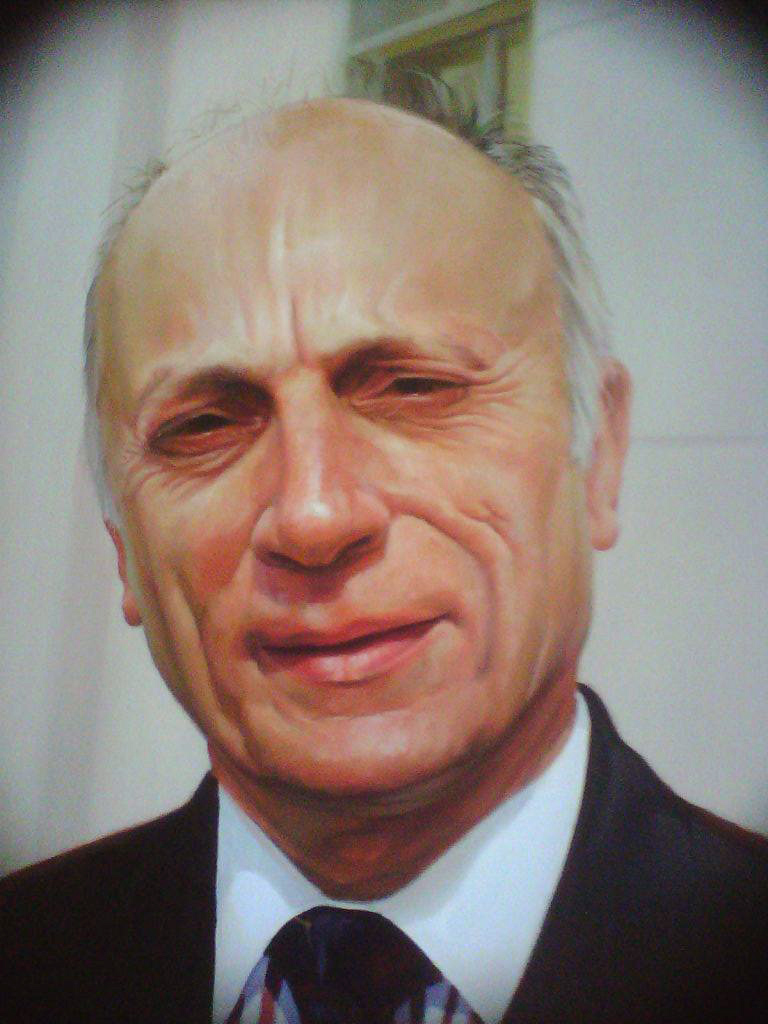
Omar Fakhri

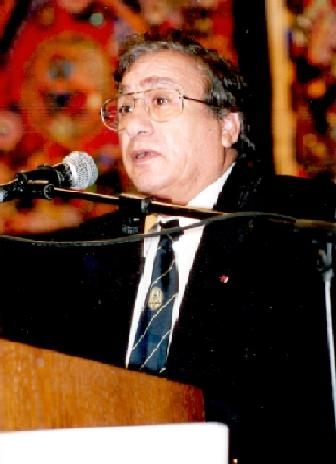
Shmuel Moreh

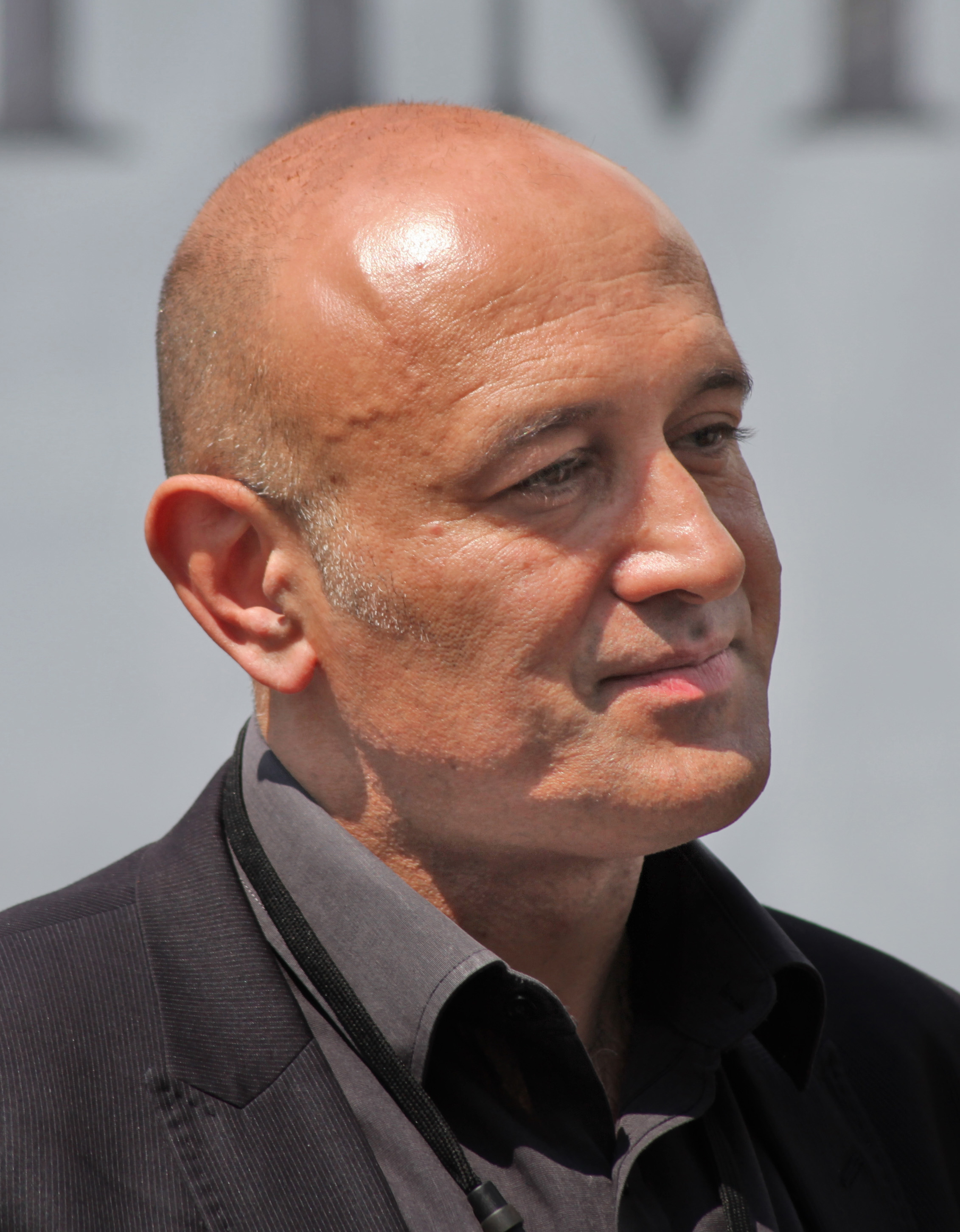
Jim Al-Khalili

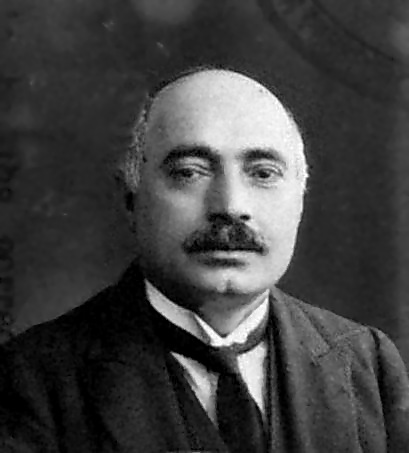
Alphonse Mingana

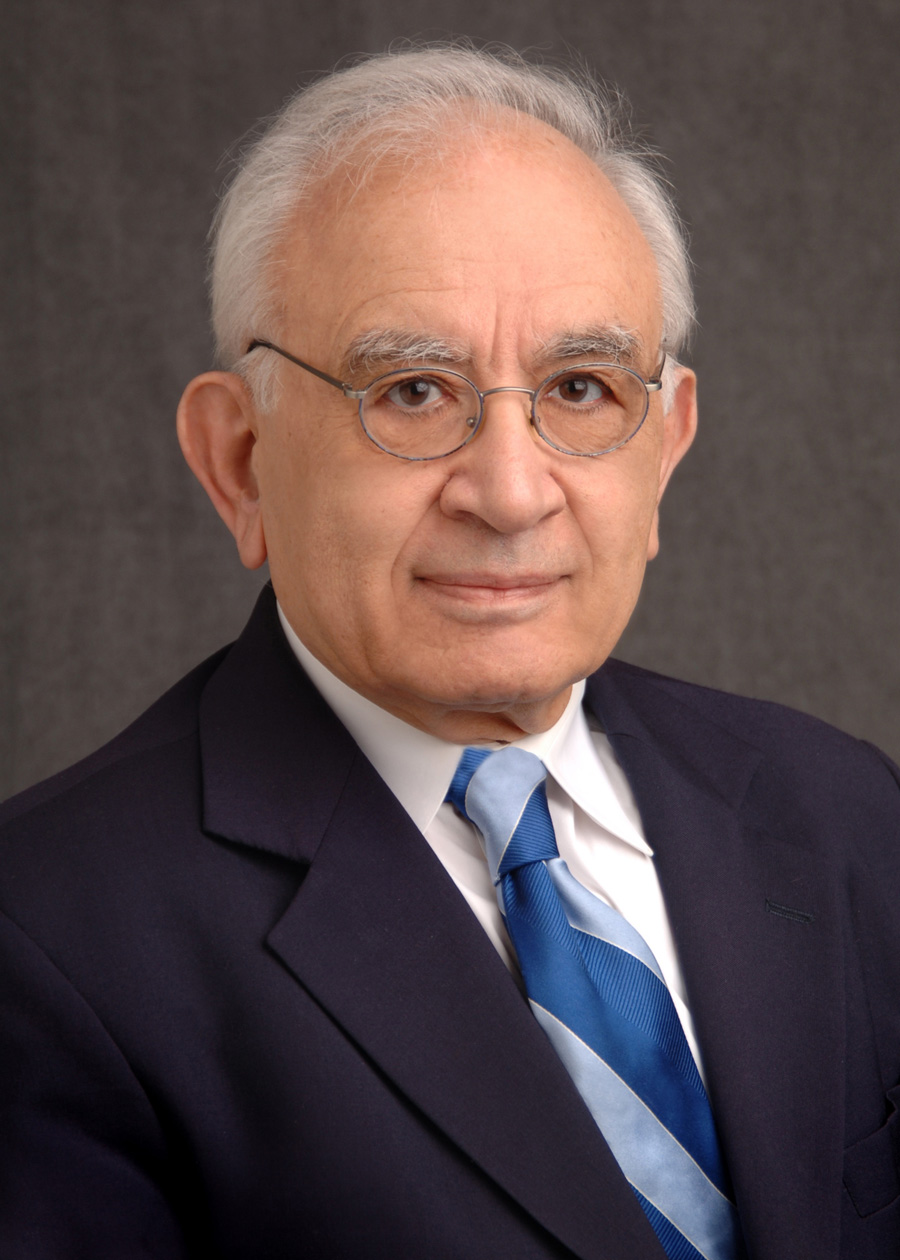
Thomas Saaty

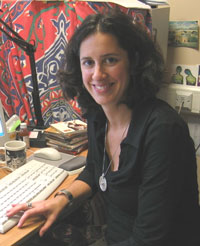
Nadje Sadig Al-Ali

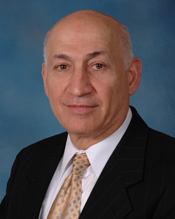
Adil E. Shamoo

- Serapion the Younger, author of a notable medicinal-botany book entitled The Book of Simple Medicaments. The book is dated 12th or 13th century. He is called "the Younger" to distinguish him from Serapion the Elder, aka Yahya ibn Sarafyun.
- Salmawaih ibn Bunan (died 840), Arab Christian physician who translated works of Galen from Greek into Arabic.
- Yahya Ibn Adi (893–974), Christian philosopher, theologian and translator working in Arabic. He was born in Tikrit, north of Iraq. He translated numerous works of Greek philosophy into Arabic, mostly from existing versions in Syriac. He was buried in the Syriac church of St Thomas in Baghdad.
- Abu Bishr Matta ibn Yunus (870–20 June 940), Christian philosopher who played an important role in the transmission of the works of Aristotle to the Islamic world. He is famous for founding the Baghdad School of Aristotelian Philosophers.
- Sami Saeed Al Ahmed (1930–2006), historian and professor at the University of Denver
- Abdul Jerri, Abdul Jabbar Hassoon Jerri (July 20, 1932), Iraqi American physicist and mathematician, most recognized for his contributions to information theory in general, in particular to the understanding of the Gibbs phenomenon.
- Mohammed Albaaj born in Basra, Iraq, on December 5, 2002) Philosopher researcher in the field of cosmological physics and philosophy.
- Omar Fakhri (born in Baghdad, Iraq, on October 18, 1934), B.Sc., M.Sc., Ph.D. FRCPath is a medical scientist who is best known for his research in several areas.
- Adil E. Shamoo (born in Baghdad, Iraq on August 1, 1941), Assyrian biochemist with an interest in biomedical ethics and foreign policy. He is a professor at the Department of Biochemistry and Molecular Biology at the University of Maryland.
- Ali Al-Wardi (born in Kadhimiya, Baghdad in 1913). He was an Iraqi Social Scientist specialized in the field of Social history. He earned his master's degree in 1948 from The University of Texas at Austin and his Ph.D. in 1950 from the same university.
- Hirmis Aboona (1940 – April 19, 2009), educator and writer, Assyrian historian who was known for his publications concerning the history of the Assyrians in northern Iraq.
- Thomas L. Saaty (born 1926, Mosul, Iraq), professor at the University of Pittsburgh, where he teaches in the Joseph M. Katz Graduate School of Business. He is the inventor, architect, and primary theoretician of the Analytic Hierarchy Process (AHP)
- Emanuel Kamber, Assyrian physics professor at Western Michigan University and was the Secretary General of the Assyrian Universal Alliance. He was born at Darbandokeh in Iraq.
- Majid Khadduri (September 27, 1909 – January 25, 2007), Iraqi–born founder of the Paul H. Nitze School of Advanced International Studies Middle East Studies program. Internationally, he was recognized as a leading authority on a wide variety of Islamic subjects, modern history and the politics of the Middle East. He was the author of more than 35 books in English and Arabic and hundreds of articles.
- Hussein Ali Mahfoudh, author in the field of Semitic languages and historical studies
- Nouman Abid Al-Jader, Mandaean chair of mathematics at Baghdad University; co-founded Iraqi Physics and Mathematics Society; acting dean of the College of Science at the University of Baghdad; University of Michigan (Ann Arbor) graduate (1950).
- Nadje Sadig Al-Ali, educator and writer
- Shmuel Moreh (born in Baghdad, December 22, 1932), professor emeritus in the Department for Arabic Language and Literature at the Hebrew University and a recipient of the Israel Prize in Middle Eastern studies in 1999.
- Behnam Afas (born 17 July 1934), Iraqi-New Zealander author and researcher. His studies are mostly in the role of the Christian scholars and missionaries in Iraq.
- Azad Bonni, MD, PhD, Iraqi Professor in the Department of Neurobiology, Harvard Medical School
- Amal Al Khedairy, academic, lecturer and founder and director of the cultural centre "Al Beit Al Iraqi" ("The Iraqi House")
- Alphonse Mingana, Assyrian theologian, historian, orientalist and former priest best known for collecting and preserving the Mingana Collection of ancient Middle Eastern manuscripts at Birmingham.
- Hind Rassam Culhane, chair of the Division of Social and Behavioral Sciences at Mercy College, New York.
- Kanan Makiya (born 1949), Iraqi academic. He is the Sylvia K. Hassenfeld Professor of Islamic and Middle Eastern Studies at Brandeis University.
- Nada Shabout, Professor of Art History, lecturer
- Avi Shlaim, historian and emeritus professor of International Relations at the University of Oxford

== Engineers and scientists ==
- Abu'l-Barakāt al-Baghdādī
- Abu'l-Hasan al-Uqlidisi
- Abdul Athem Alsabti, Mandaean supernova astrophysicist who introduced astronomy teaching into Iraq in 1970; University of Manchester graduate (1970); minor planet 10478 Alsabti named after him; founded Iraqi Astronomical Society; project leader for the Iraqi National Astronomical Observatory.
- Abdul Jabbar Abdullah, Mandaean wave theory physicist, dynamical meteorologist, and President Emeritus of Baghdad University; MIT graduate (1946); chair of physics at Baghdad University; co-founded Iraqi Physics and Mathematics Society.
- Ahmed ibn Yusuf, mathematician
- Al-Abbās ibn Said al-Jawharī
- Al-Karaji
- Al-Kindi (Alkindus)
- Al-Samawal al-Maghribi
- Ara Darzi, Baron Darzi of Denham, Ara Warkes Darzi, Baron Darzi of Denham, KBE PC, (born 7 May 1960), one of the world's leading surgeons at Imperial College London, where he holds the Paul Hamlyn Chair of Surgery, specialising in the field of minimally invasive and robot-assisted surgery, having pioneered many new techniques and technologies.
- Azzam Alwash, Iraqi hydraulic engineer and environmentalist. He was awarded the Goldman Environmental Prize in 2013, in particular for his efforts on restoring salt marshs in southern Iraq, which had been destroyed during the Saddam Hussein regime.
- Berossus, Hellenistic-era Babylonian writer, priest of Bel Marduk and astronomer writing in Greek, active at the beginning of the 3rd century BC
- Brethren of Purity (Ikhwan al-Safa')
- Dlawer Ala'Aldeen, Founding President of the Middle East Research Institute (MERI); former Minister of Higher Education & Scientific Research in Kurdistan Regional Government (2009–2012); former professor of medicine in Nottingham University, UK (1992–2014); human right lobbyist
- Fakhri A. Bazzaz, plant ecologist
- Farouk Al-Kasim, Norwegian-Iraqi petroleum geologist. He played a major role in the exploitation of Norway's petroleum resources within the Norwegian Petroleum Directorate.
- Lihadh Al-Gazali, geneticist
- Grigor Gurzadyan, Armenian astronomer, and pioneer of space astronomy, born October 15, 1922, in Baghdad to parents who fled in 1915 Western Armenia.
- Hunayn ibn Ishaq, scientist and physician
- Ibn al-Haytham (Alhacen/Alhazen)
- Ibn Sa'd al-Baghdadi
- Ibn Tahir al-Baghdadi
- Jafar Dhia Jafar, Iraqi nuclear physicist
- Jim Al-Khalili, Iraqi-born British theoretical physicist, author and science communicator; professor of theoretical physics and chair in the Public Engagement in Science at the University of Surrey.
- Khidir Elias Putres, Iraqi Environmental Leader
- Khidir Hamza, Iraqi nuclear physicist
- Kidinnu
- Naburimannu
- Seleucus of Seleucia
- Sind ibn Ali
- Souad Naji Al-Azzawi Iraqi academic and environmentalist
- Sudines, Babylonian sage, mentioned as one of the famous Chaldean mathematicians and astronomer-astrologers by later Roman writers like Strabo (Geografia 16:1–6).
- Shaoul Sassoon, Iraqi Jewish engineer, worked in the government of Saddam Hussein

== Film actors and directors ==
- Muntadher Abdulrahman, Iraqi actor and artist
- Amel Senan, (born October 22, 1966), Iraqi-Turkmen actress known for her role of Nadia of the 1988 Iraqi television series Nadia
- Mohamed Al-Daradji
- Koutaiba Al Janabi
- Namaa Alward, actress
- Ahmed Yassin Aldaradji, writer-director from Iraq based in the UK known for Hanging Gardens
- Naguib el-Rihani, actor
- Atia Jbara Al-Darraji, Iraqi director born in Baghdad known for Path of Maryam
- Abbas Fahdel, director of Dawn of the World
- Tariq Hashim
- Hind Kamel, well-known Iraqi actress and film director now residing in Jordan
- Saaed Khalifa, actor
- Farid Majari, film maker
- Dina Mousawi, actress
- Maysoon Pachachi, director of Return to the Land of Wonders
- Basam Ridha, actor
- Hiner Saleem, film director
- Saad Salman, film director known for his documentary Baghdad On/Off
- Samir, film director based in Switzerland, known for his documentary Forget Baghdad

=== Film actors and directors of Iraqi descent ===
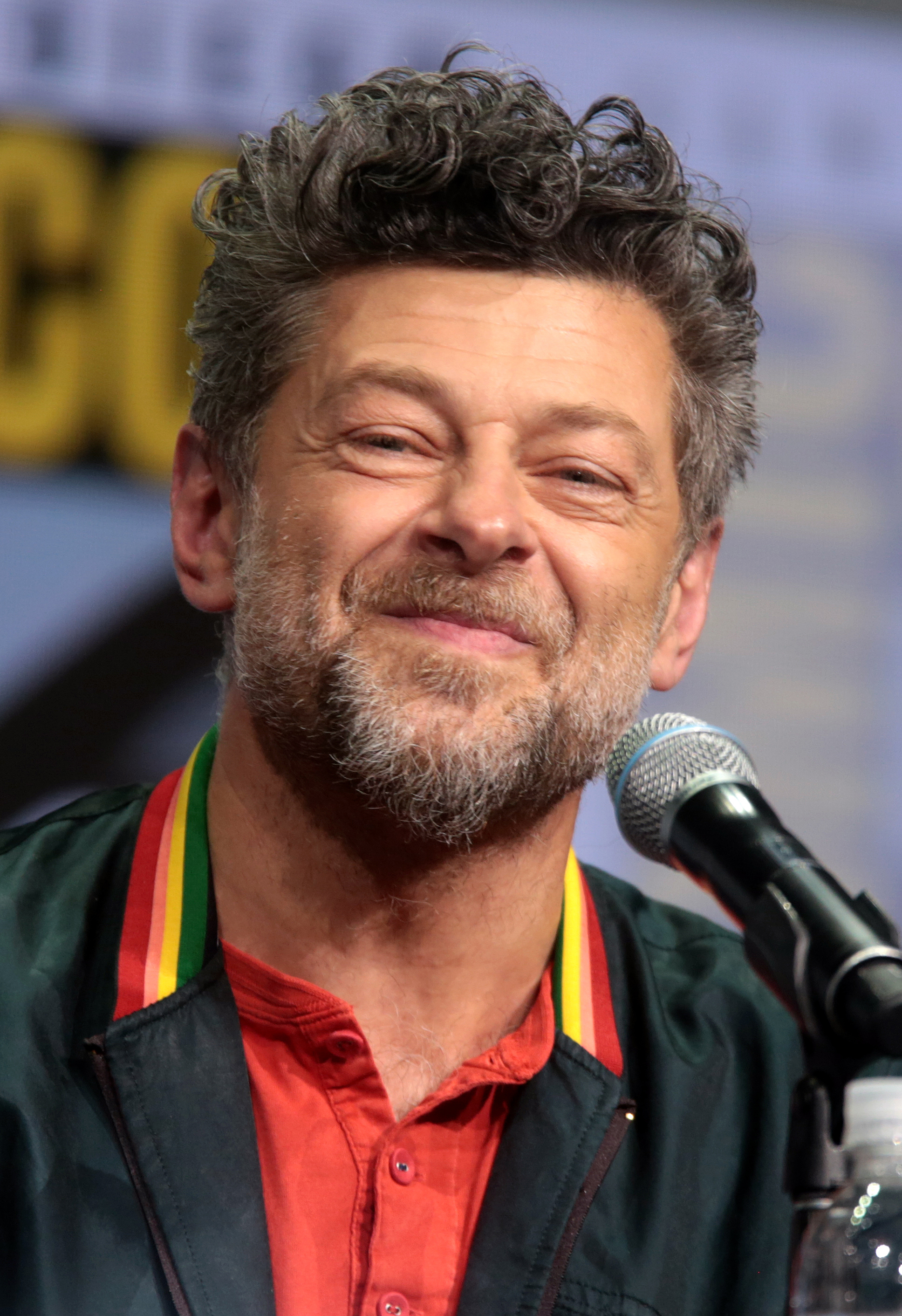
Andy Serkis

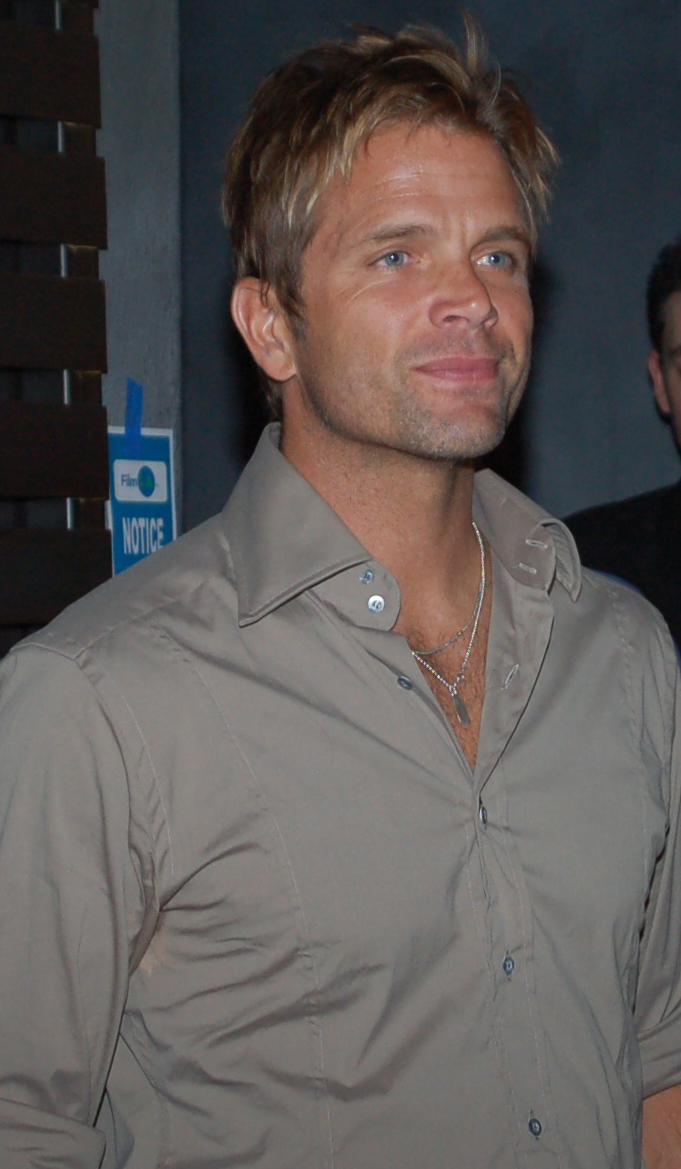
David Chokachi

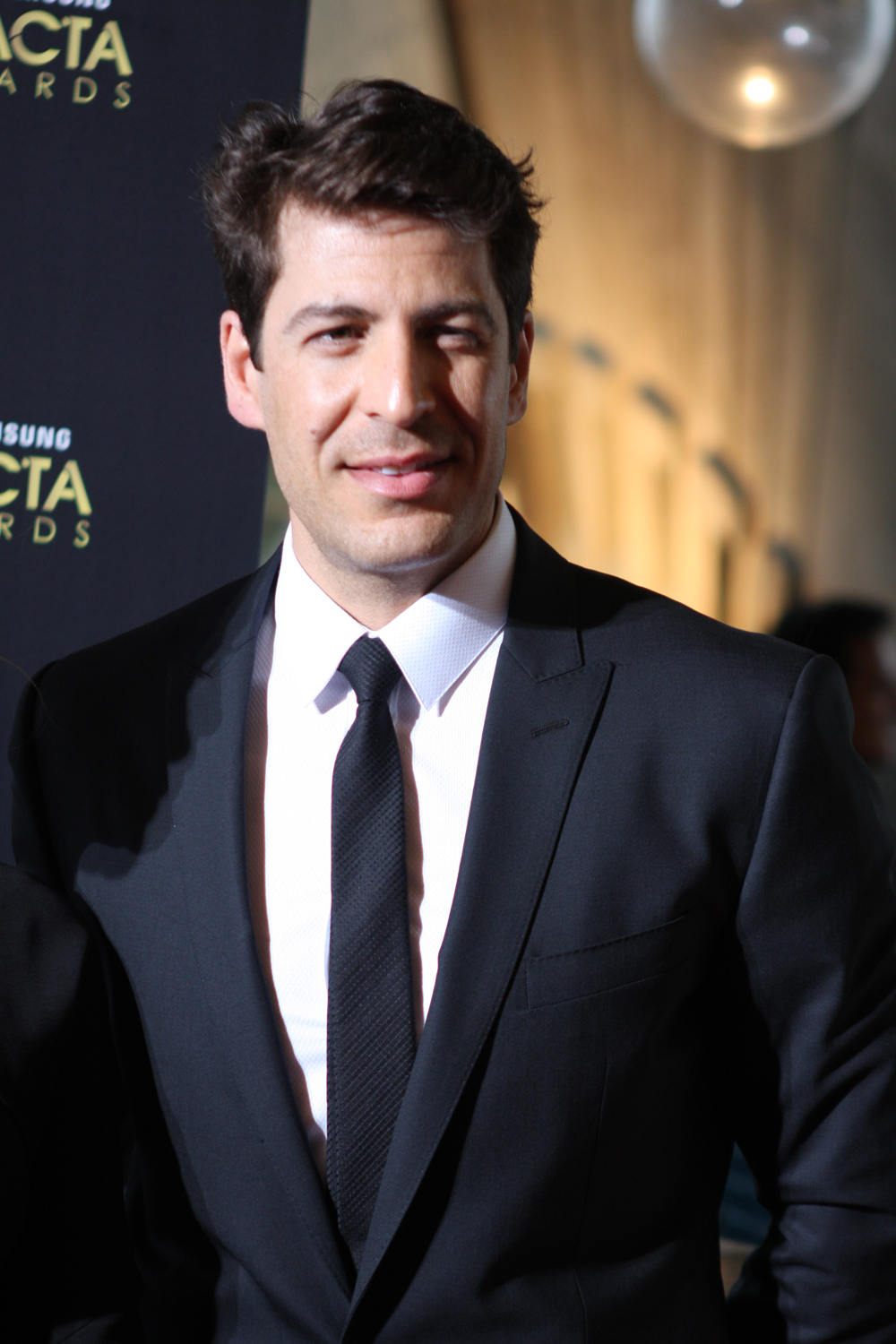
Don Hany

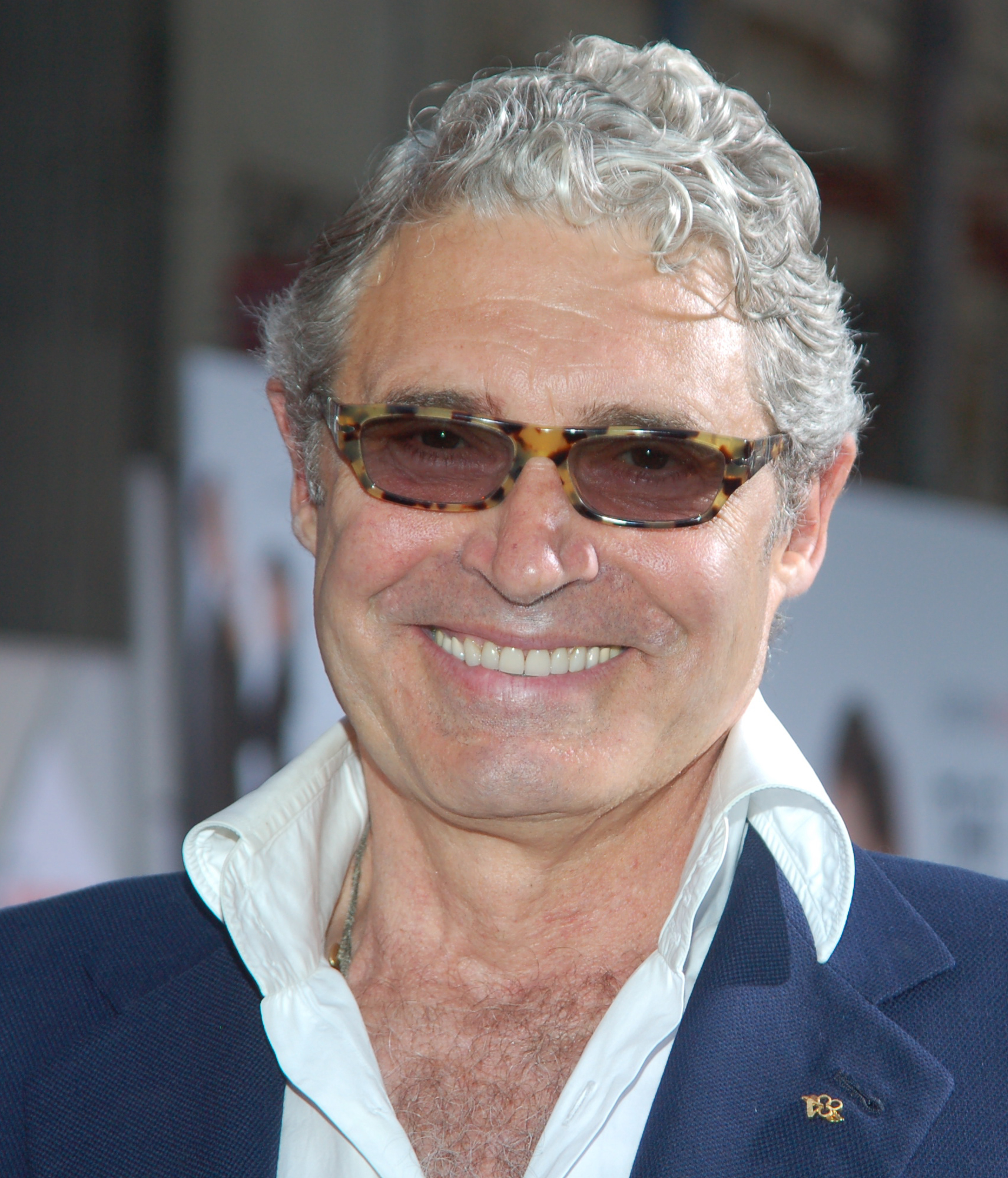
Michael Nouri

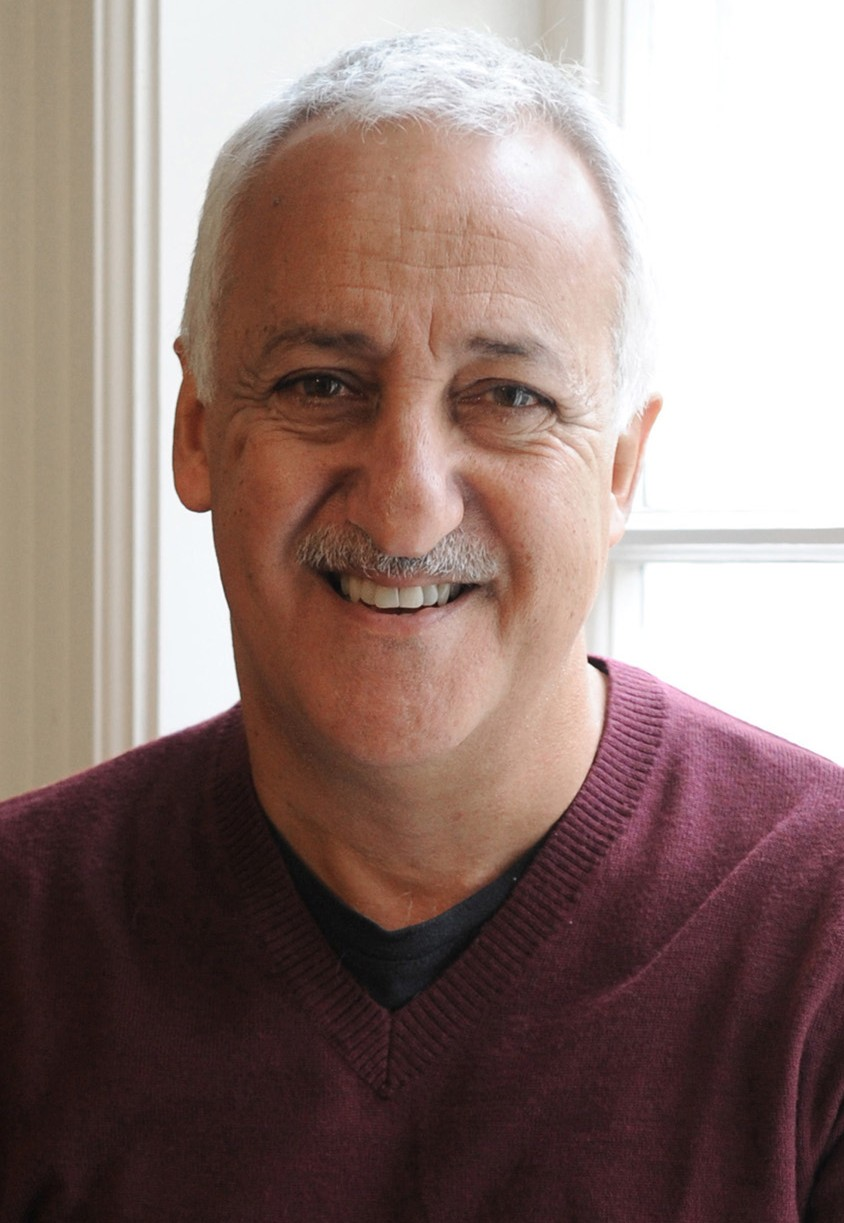
Brian George

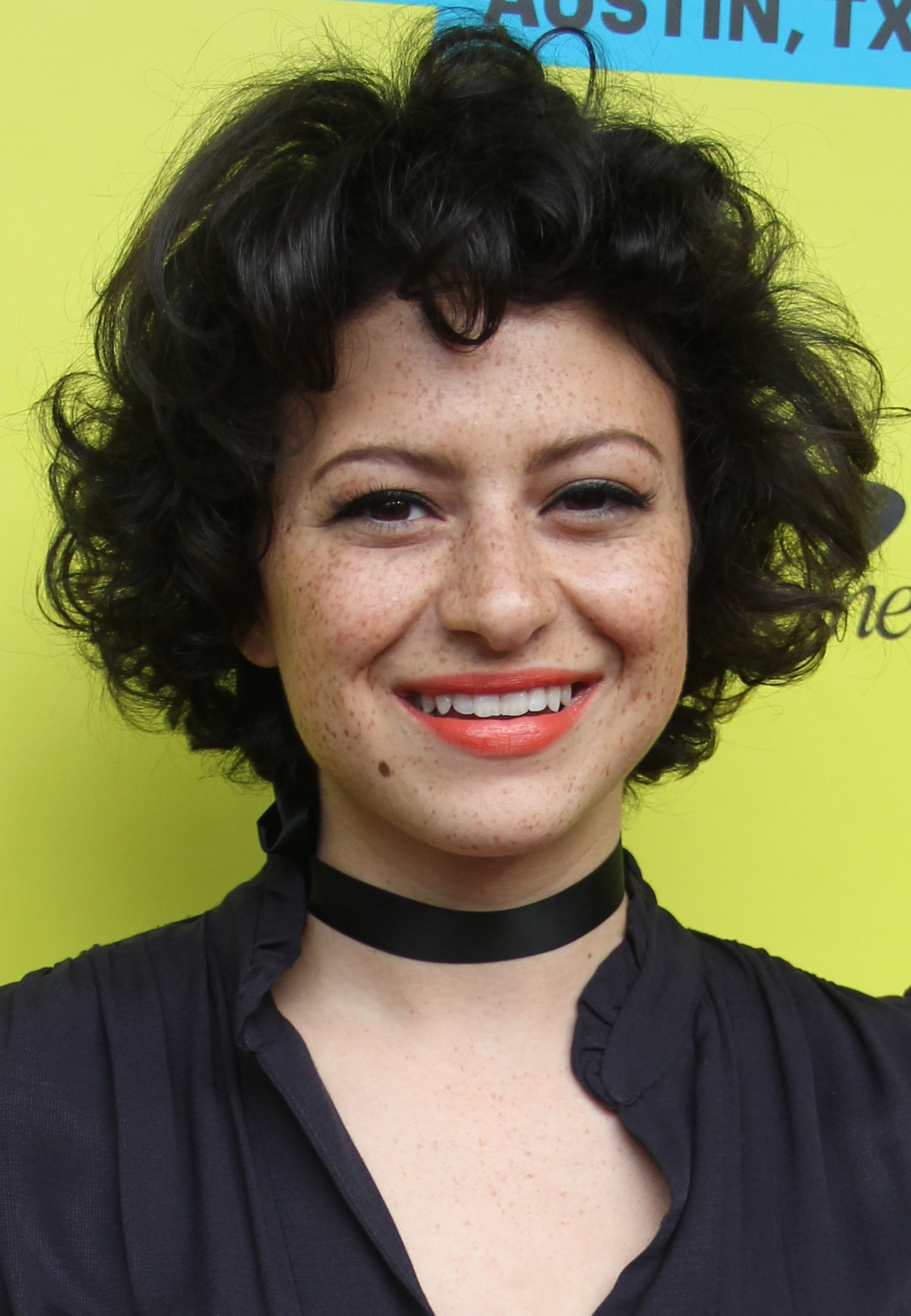
Alia Shawkat

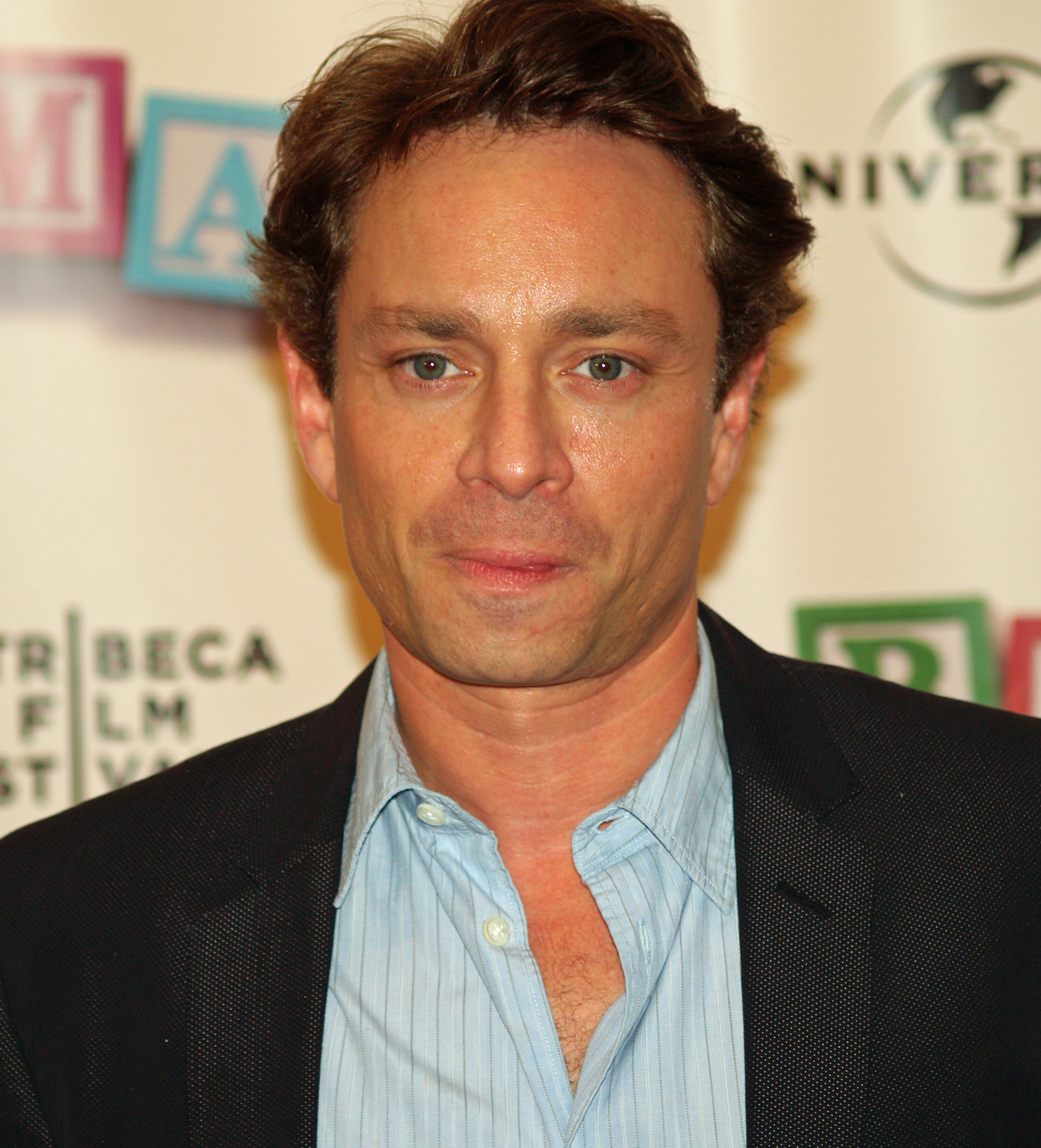
Kattan at the 2008 Tribeca Film Festival.

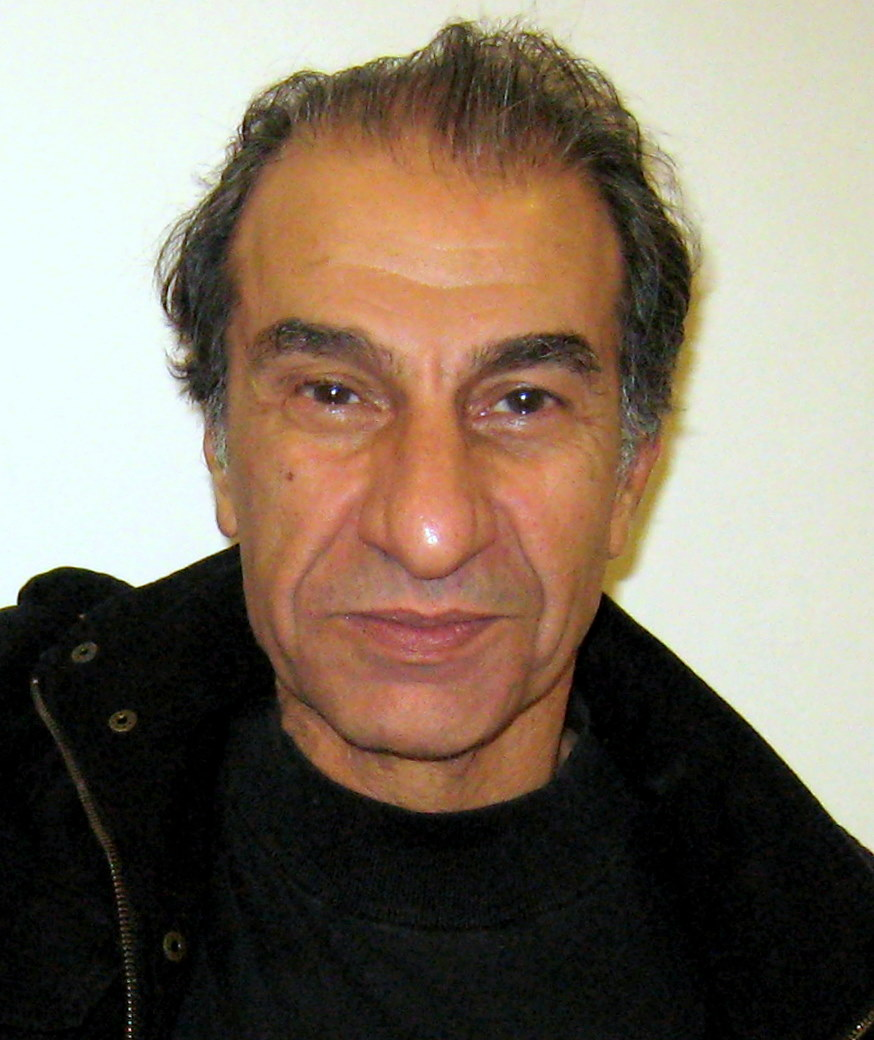
Sasson Gabai

- Ibraham Alzubaidy, actor, director, and writer, born in Kut, Iraq in 1978. He studied at California State University, Northridge, majoring in Cinema and Television Art-Film Directing.
- Andy Serkis (born 20 April 1964), English film actor, director and author. His mother was half Iraqi and half English and taught disabled children. His father was an Iraqi gynaecologist of Armenian ethnicity.
- David Chokachi (born David Al-Chokhachy on January 16, 1968, in Plymouth, Massachusetts), American film and television actor. He's best known for his role in the TV series Witchblade, Baywatch, and Beyond The Break. His father is Iraqi Turkmen and his mother is Finnish
- Michael Nouri, American television and film actor. He may be best known for his role as Nick Hurley, in the 1983 film Flashdance. Nouri was born in Washington, D.C., the son of Gloria (née Montgomery) and Edmond Nouri. His father was born in Baghdad in 1918.
- Ruby Myers Sulochana (सुलोचना) (1907–1983), Indian silent film star of Jewish ancestry, hailing from the community of Baghdadi Jews in India. In her heyday she was one of the highest paid actresses of her time.
- Layth Abdulamir
- Sasson Gabai (born 24 November 1947), Israeli actor. Gabai was born in Baghdad to an Iraqi Jewish family. During his childhood he immigrated together with his family to Israel.
- Uri Gavriel (born April 3, 1955), Israeli theater, film and TV actor. Uri Gavriel was born in 1955 in the Magdiel transit camp in Israel to the Iraqi Jewish immigrants Bertha and Gabriel Gavriel.
- Joe Balass (born 1966 in Baghdad, Iraq), Iraqi Canadian film maker
- Dina Mousawi, actress of British/Iraqi origin
- Maysoon Pachachi (born September 17, 1947), film director, editor and producer of Iraqi origin. She was educated in Iraq, the U.S., Britain and can speak English, Arabic, French and Italian. She is the daughter of Iraqi politician Adnan Pachachi.
- Anja Al-Erhayem, filmmaker (Iraqi father/Danish mother)
- Ja'far 'Abd Al-Hamid, Iraqi-British filmmaker of "Mesocafe".
- Fajer Al-Kaisi, Iraqi-Canadian actor, now resides in the States.
- Dar Salim, Danish actor, born in Baghdad, Iraq in 1977. He played the role of Qotho, one of Khal Drogo's bloodriders, in Game of Thrones.
- Lewis Alsamari, actor starred in the Universal Pictures film United 93
- Usama Alshaibi, director of Muhammad and Jane and Nice Bombs
- Amer Alwan, film director known for Zaman, The Man From The Reeds
- Joe Balass, film maker
- Claudia Basrawi, German actress and writer (German mother and Iraqi father)
- Carole Basri, filmmaker
- Zana Briski, director of Born into Brothels
- Selma Chalabi, film maker
- Brian George, British-Israeli actor, most famous role is as Pakistani restaurateur Babu Bhatt on Seinfeld. (Born to Baghdadi Jewish parents).
- Shosha Goren, actress and comedian
- Ishtar Yasin Gutiérrez, Iraqi Chilean-Costa Rican director, screenwriter, producer and actress. Daughter of Mohsen Sadoon Yasin, an Iraqi theater director, and Elena Gutiérrez, a Chilean-Costa Rican ballet dancer and choreographer.
- Yasmine Hanani, American actress featured in documentary films Voices of Iraq and My Country, My Country
- Don Hany, actor (Won Best Actor for Winning the Peace (2005)
- Parine Jaddo, Iraqi-American filmmaker of Rasta's Paradise
- Nicholas Kadi, actor, known for "Quest For Fire", "Navy Seals" and "George Of The Jungle".
- Chris Kattan, American comedian and actor, best known for his work on the sketch show Saturday Night Live. (Born to an Iraqi Jewish father and Hungarian Buddhist mother).
- Charlotte Lewis, actress most notable for her lead female role in The Golden Child alongside Eddie Murphy
- Anisa Mehdi, Emmy Award-winning film director, journalist and director of Inside Mecca
- Yigal Naor, actor
- Rashed Radwan, Spanish film director
- Heather Raffo, playwright/actress most known for her role in 9 Parts of Desire
- Liat Ron, actress and dancer
- Mohamed Said (actor), Swedish actor
- Osamah Sami, actor
- Alia Shawkat, American actress known as Maeby Funke on Arrested Development
- Nadira (Farhat Ezekiel Nadira (5 December 1932 – 9 February 2006), commonly known as Nadira, actress in Indian Bollywood cinema
- Amy Fadhli (born January 30, 1966, in Galveston, Texas), American fitness model, actress and winner of the Fitness America National Champion 1996. Her father is Iraqi, born in Baghdad, a cardiovascular surgeon, and her mother is Czech, a sculptor and breeder of Arabian horses.
- Randa Chahal Sabag, Lebanese film director, producer and screenwriter born to an Iraqi mother and Lebanese father.
- Abraham Sofaer (October 1, 1896 – January 21, 1988), stage actor of Burmese-Jewish descent who became a familiar supporting player on film and television in his later years. He was born in Rangoon.
- Salim Al-Basri (July 7, 1926, in Baghdad – May 8, 1997), Iraqi film director

== Human rights activists ==
- Amir Ashour, LGBTQIA+ rights activist.
- Widad Akrawi, Danish writer, doctor, advocate for peace, human rights, justice and equality, co-founder of Defend International.
- Zainab Salbi (born 1969), Iraqi American author, women's rights activist, filmmaker, humanitarian and social entrepreneur who is founder and former CEO (1993–2011) of Washington-based Women for Women International.
- Munjed Al Muderis (born 1972), Iraqi born Australian author, Australian ambassador of the red cross, human rights activist and refugee rights activist. Lives in Sydney / Australia.
- Dalal Khario (born circa 1997), Iraqi-German author and women's rights activist.
- Safaa Al Sarai (born 1993), human rights activist who has been called the icon of the Iraqi uprising.
- Worood Zuhair (born 1987), Iraqi feminist and women's rights activist and Biologist.

== Journalists ==
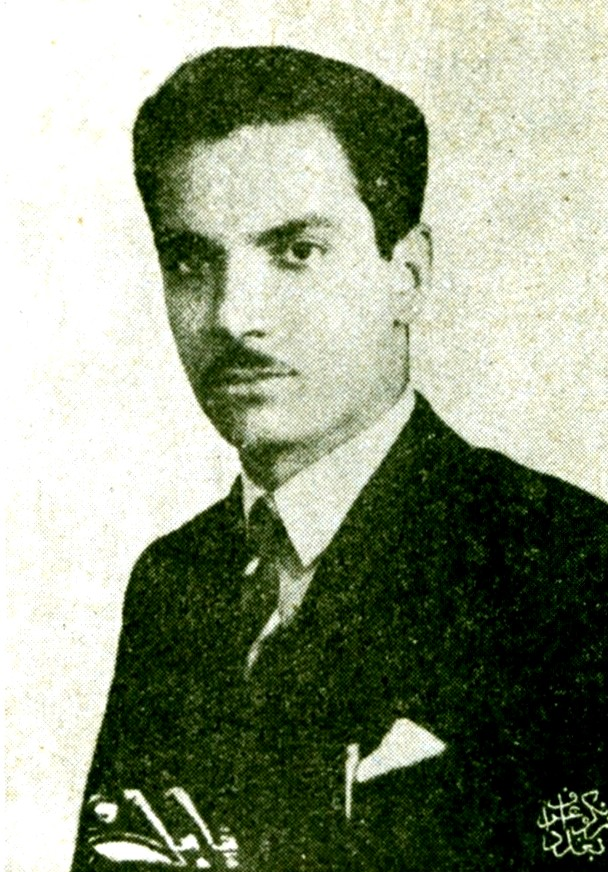
Safa Khulusi

- Alaa Al-Marjani (born 1967), photojournalist from Najaf, worked for Associated Press and is currently working with Reuters.
- Miriam Nerma (1890–1972), Iraqi journalist who wrote about women's rights and society. She is considered by many to be the first woman to write in a mainstream journal. She also started her own Journal "The Arab Girl" in 1937.
- Safa Khulusi (1917–1995), Iraqi historian, novelist, poet, journalist and broadcaster. He is known for mediating between Arabic- and English-language cultures, and for his scholarship of modern Iraqi literature.
- Talal Al-Haj, Iraqi Journalist. He is the current New York/United Nations Bureau Chief for the Al-Arabiya news network.
- Fadhil Al Azzawi, writer, journalist and translator
- Zuhair Al-Jezairy, journalist
- Atwar Bahjat, journalist and reporter murdered in Iraq
- Rauf Hassan, journalist and writer
- Bilal Hussein, photojournalist
- Salam Pax, blogger, translator and journalist
- Taher Thabet, journalist
- Ghaith Abdul-Ahad, unembedded Iraqi journalist

=== Journalists of Iraqi descent ===
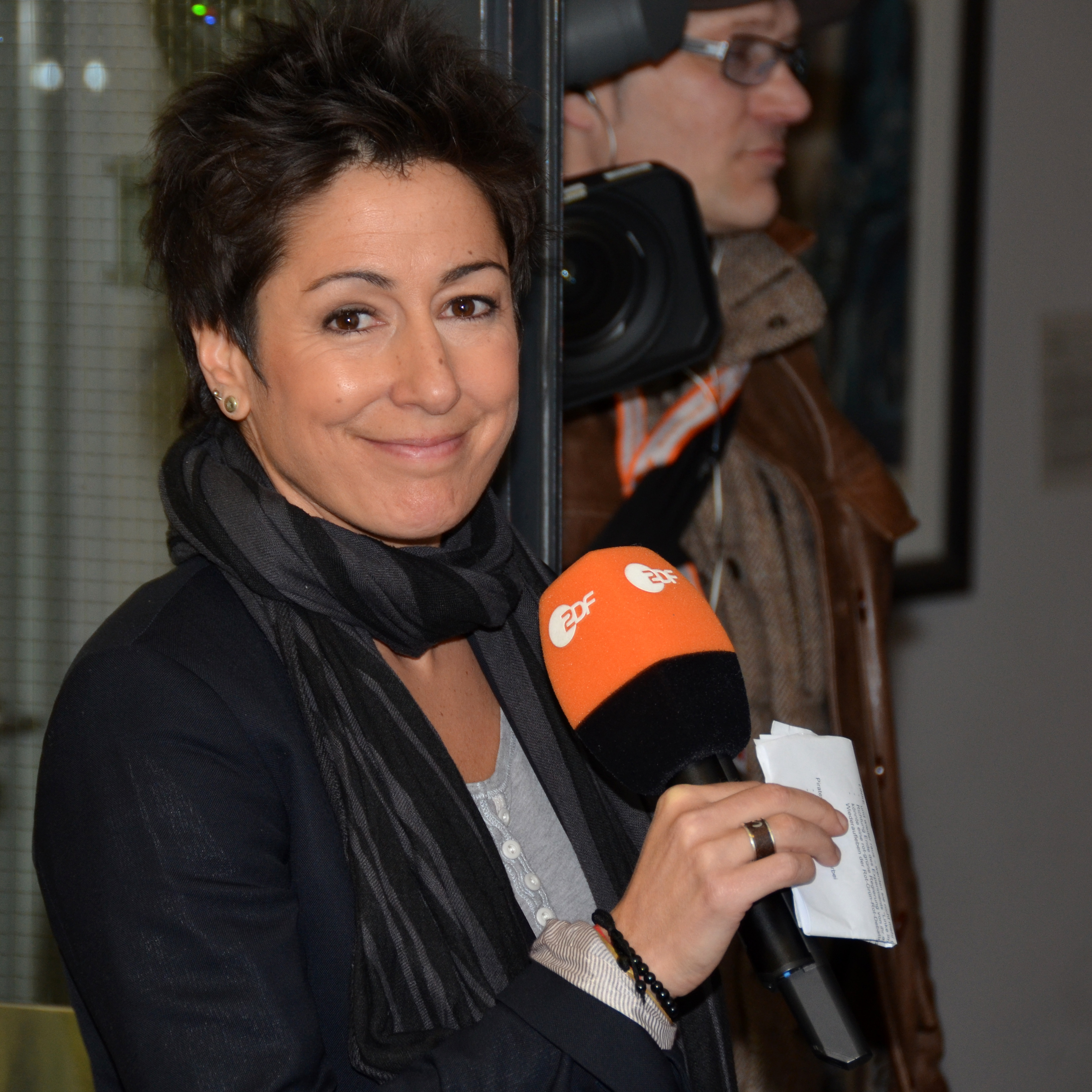
Dunja Hayali

- Lorraine Ali, reporter, editor and culture writer for many publications, including Newsweek. Ali was born to an Iraqi American father who immigrated from Baghdad to Los Angeles in the 1950s. Her mother is of French Canadian descent.
- Leila Barclay, American journalist and storyteller
- Nina Burleigh, American writer and journalist. Burleigh has written about her visits to Iraq, her mother's country of birth, both as a child and later in life as a journalist.
- Dunja Hayali, German journalist and TV presenter
- Salam Karam, Swedish journalist, has reported for the newspaper Svenska Dagbladet and in the radio program Godmorgon, världen!.
- Farah Nosh, photojournalist
- Michelle Nouri, journalist and writer, her publications include "La ragazza di Baghdad" ("The girl in Baghdad")
- Daniel Pearl (1963–2002), American journalist, kidnapped and murdered in Karachi, Pakistan. (Born to an Iraqi Jewish mother).
- Tim Judah, reporter for The Economist and author
- Sharif Hikmat Nashashibi, London-based journalist, analyst on Arab affairs, and co-founder and chairman of Arab Media Watch, a media watchdog organization that monitors and responds to British media coverage of the Arab world. Nashashibi was born in Kuwait to a Palestinian-Jordanian-Lebanese Muslim father and an Iraqi-Syrian Christian mother.

== Kings and rulers ==
- Lugal-zage-si, the last Sumerian king before the fall of Sumer and rise of the Akkadian Empire. He reigned between c. 2358 and 2334 BC.
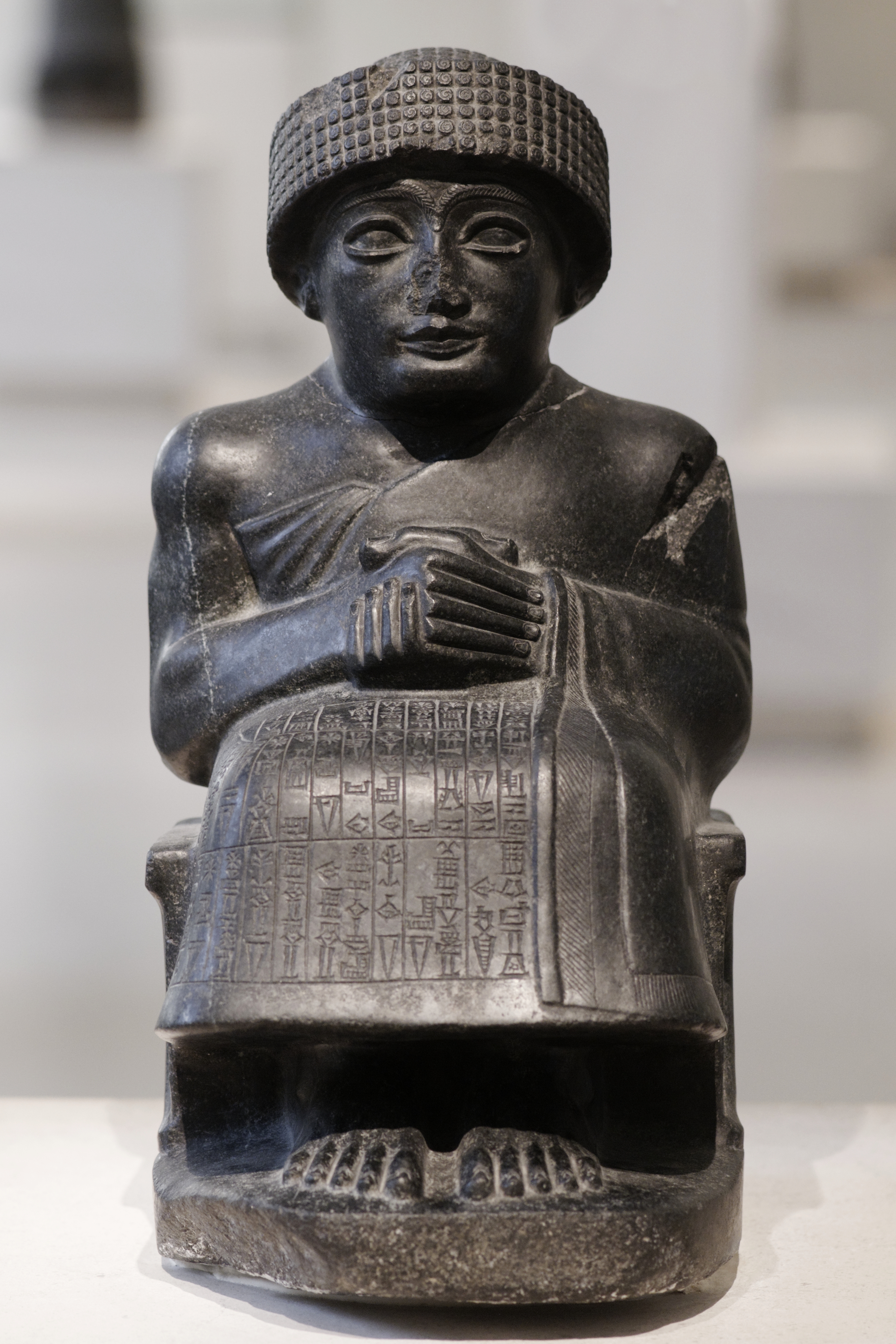
- Statue of Gudea
  Sargon of Akkad, Founder and first ruler of the Akkadian Empire, he reigned around c. 2334 – 2279 BC.
- Naram-Sin: Akkadian king who ruled the Akkadian Empire, between c. 2255–2218 BC.
- Gudea, king of Lagash, who ruled from c. 2080 to 2060 BC or c.2144 to c.2124 BC. His reign ushered in a golden age of Lagash, and artifacts from his era were found in many countries around the middle east.
- Hammurabi Babylonian king who ruled the Old Babylonian Empire from c. 1792 to c. 1750 BC. Best known for the Code of Hammurabi, one of the first well preserved codes of law in history.
- Adad-nirari II, first Assyrian King of the Neo-Assyrian empire. He ruled from 911- 891 BC.
- Tiglath-Pileser III, Assyrian king, credited with expanding the Neo-Assyrian Empire and doubling its size, he ruled from 745 to 727 BC.
- Sargon II, Assyrian king of the Neo-Babylonian Empire from 722- 705 BC. He is the founder of the Sargonid dynasty.
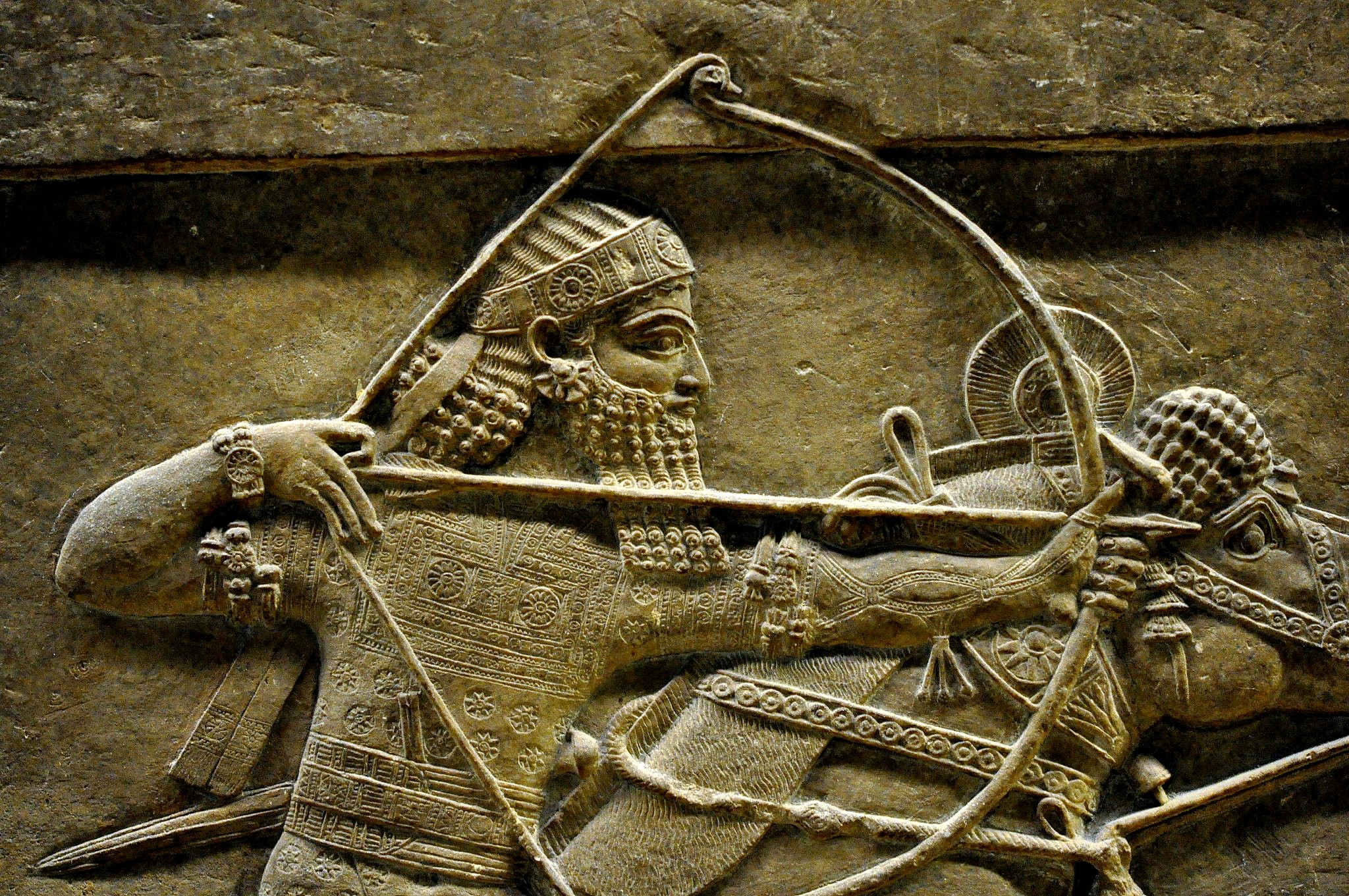
- Ashurbanipal
  Sennacherib, Assyrian king of the Neo-Babylonian Empire from 705- 681 BC. He is known for his mention in the Hebrew Bible, and the destruction of Babylon.
- Esarhaddon, Assyrian king who ruled the Neo-Assyrian Empire from 681 to 669 BC, best known for his conquest in Egypt.
- Ashurbanipal, Assyrian king who ruled the Neo-Assyrian Empire from 669 – 631 BC. He is best known for his patronage of art and literature, building the Library of Ashurbanipal, and the famous Lion Hunt of Ashurbanipal reliefs that adorned his palace in Nineveh.
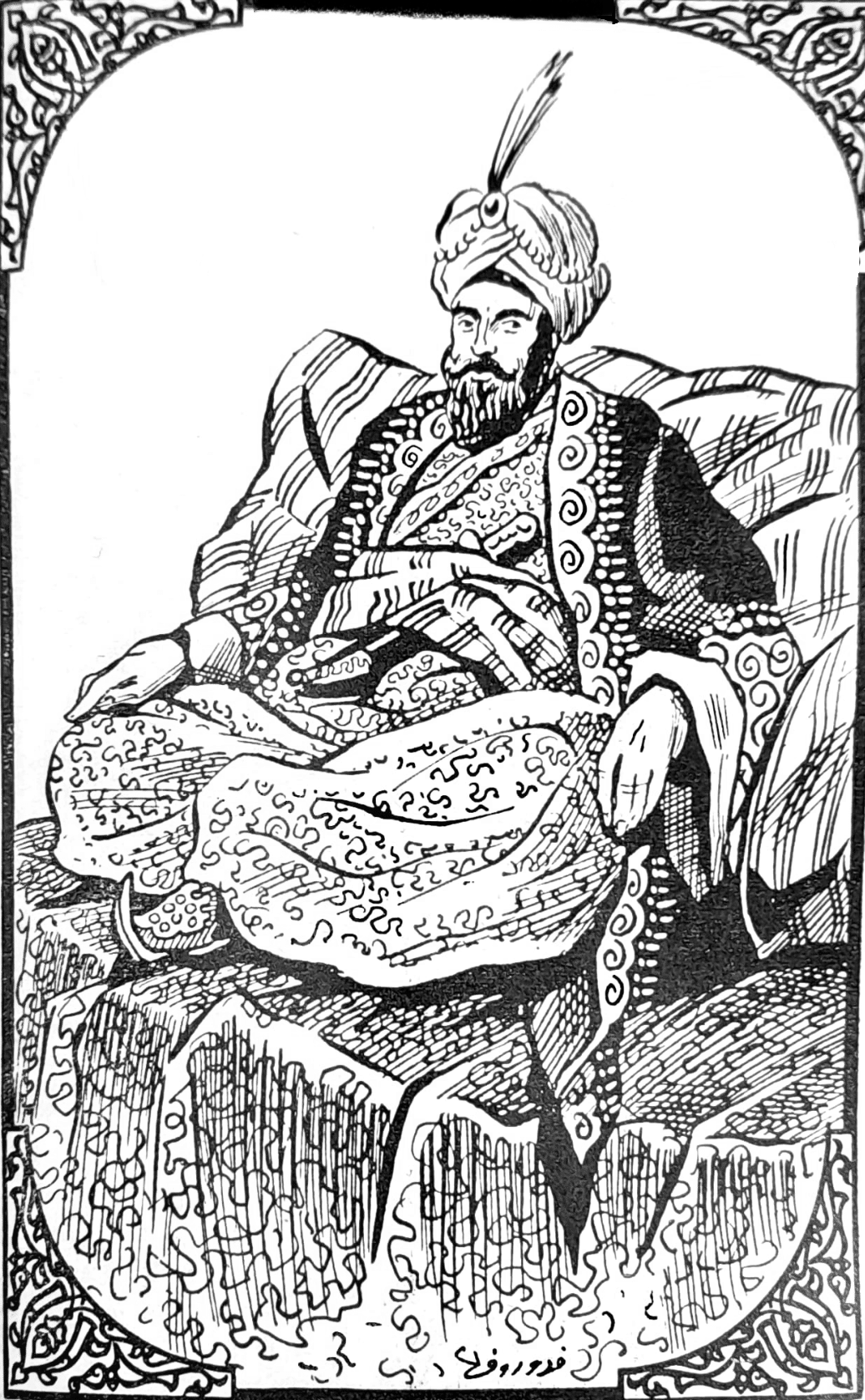
  Harun Al-Rashid
- Nabopolassar: Babylonian king and founder of the Neo-Babylonian Empire from 626- 605 BC.
- Nebuchadrezzar II, second king of the Neo-Babylonian Empire from 605- 562 BC. He is best known for his role in Jewish history and building the Hanging Gardens of Babylon.
- Sanatruq I, a king of the Kingdom of Hatra, he ruled around 140–180 CE.
- Sanatruq II, the last king of the Kingdom of Hatra, he ruled around 205 to 240/41 CE. During his rule, Hatra first became a Roman vassal state then fell to the Sassanians.
- Abū Jaʿfar Al-Mansur, second Abbasid caliph, who moved the Abbasid Capital to Baghdad, and ruled from 754 CE to 775 CE.
- Harun al-Rashid, fifth Abbasid caliph who ruled between 786 and 809 CE. He is best known for ushering in the Islamic Golden Age and building the Bayt al-Hikma.
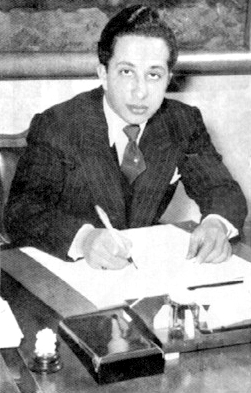
- Faisal II of Iraq
  Al-Musta'sim Billah, last Abbasid caliph to rule Baghdad. He reigned from 1242 to1258 CE, his reign ended with the Mongol sack of Baghdad.
- Faisal I of Iraq (20 May 1885 – 8 September 1933), King of the Arab Kingdom of Syria or Greater Syria in 1920, and King of Iraq from 23 August 1921 to 1933. He was a member of the Hashemite dynasty.
- Ghazi of Iraq (2 May 1912 – 4 April 1939), King of the Hashemite Kingdom of Iraq from 1933 to 1939 having been briefly Crown Prince of the Kingdom of Syria in 1920. He was born in Mecca (in present-day Saudi Arabia), the only son of Faisal I, the first King of Iraq.
- Faisal II of Iraq (2 May 1935 – 14 July 1958), last King of Iraq. He reigned from 4 April 1939 until July 1958, when he was killed during the 14 July Revolution together with numerous members of his family.
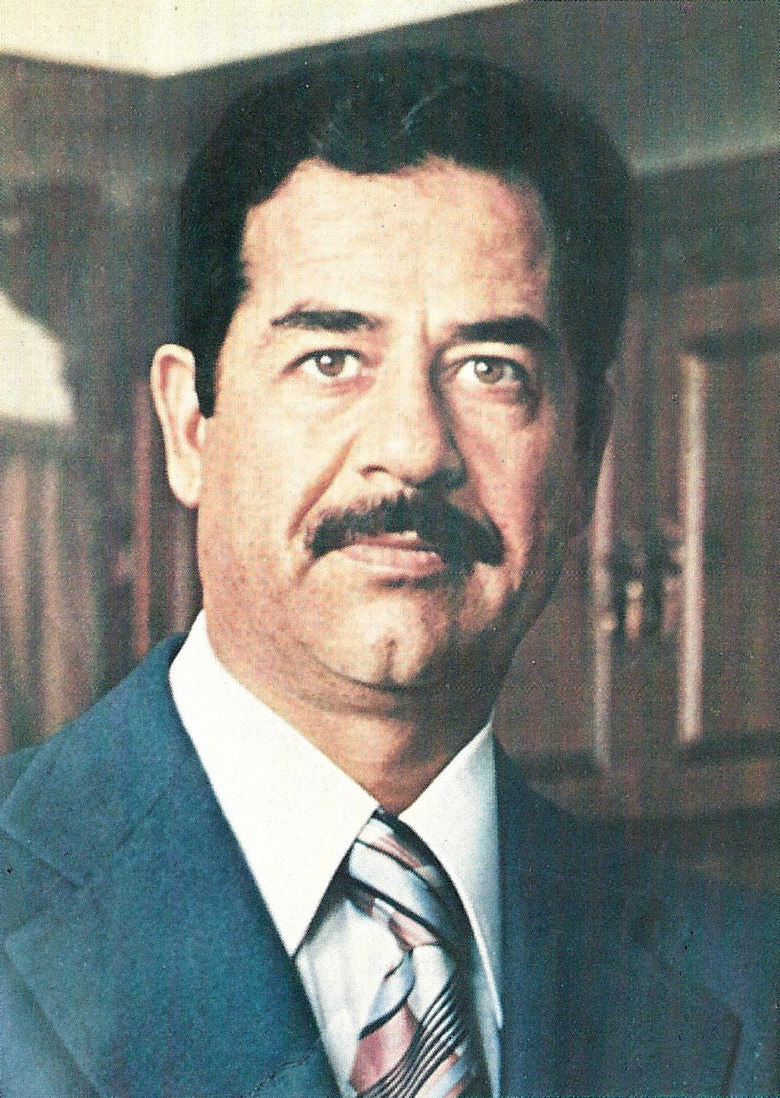
- Saddam Hussain
  Abdul Karim Qasim, Iraqi military officer and leader who came to power in 1958 after overthrowing the Iraqi monarchy, and served as prime minister of Iraq until the 1963 Ramadan Revolution, when he was overthrown and executed.
- Ahmed Hassan al-Bakr, Iraqi politician who served as both president of Iraq, and prime minister between 1968 and 1979. He was a leading member of the Ba'ath Party.
- Saddam Hussein, Iraqi politician who served as both president of Iraq, and prime minister between 1979 and 2003. He was a leader of the Ba'ath Party, he was overthrown in 2003 by the US invasion of Iraq, and executed in 2006.

=== Other royals ===
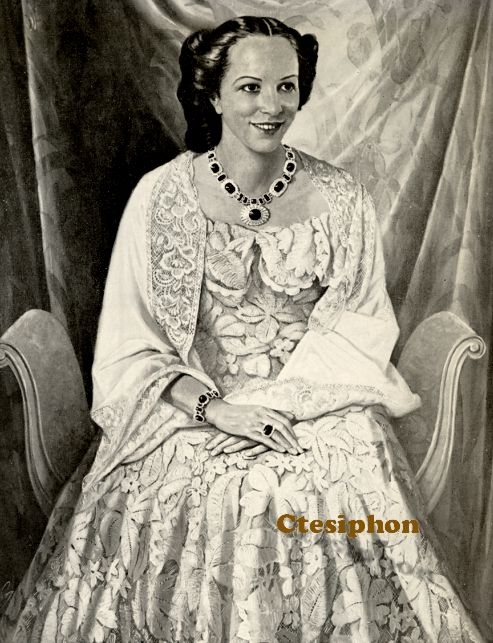
- Aliya bint Ali, queen of Iraq
  Naqiʾa, Assyrian queen, wife of king Sennacherib and mother to king Esarhaddon. She is lived around 728–669 BC and is known as one of the most powerful women of the Neo-Assyrian Empire .
- 'Abd al-Ilah (14 November 1913 – 14 July 1958), cousin and brother-in-law of King Ghazi of the Kingdom of Iraq.
- Huzaima bint Nasser (1884–1935), Arabian princess, Sharifa of Mecca. She married the King Faisal I, son of the Sharif of Mecca and became queen of Iraq from 1921 to 1933.
- Aliya bint Ali (1911–December 21, 1950), Arabian princess and a queen consort of Iraq. She was the spouse of king Ghazi of Iraq and the queen mother of Faisal II of Iraq. She was the last queen of Iraq.

== Military figures ==
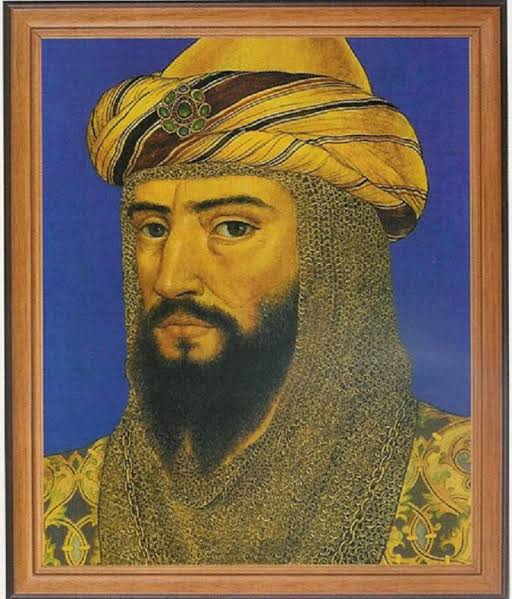
- Saladin
  Saladin Muslim military best known for leading Muslim armies against the crusader army during the Third crusade. He was born in the city of Tikrit, in c. 1137. He started the Ayyubid dynasty and ruled as sultan in both Egypt and Syria.
- Mahmud Shevket Pasha (1856–1913) Ottoman Minister of War from 1911 to 1913 and Grand Vizier in 1913. Born in Baghdad in 1856
- Khalil Dabbagh (1916–1969) Iraqi military officer.
- Talib Shaghati (born: 1950) retired Iraqi military officer.
- Hamid Raja Shalah (born: 1950) retired commander of the Iraqi Air Force .
- Abd al-Sattar al-Aboussi (1930–1970), Iraqi military officer
- Salah al-Din al-Sabbagh (1889–1945), Iraqi Army officer
- Hagop Hagopian, one of the founders and the main leader of the Armenian Secret Army for the Liberation of Armenia (ASALA).
- Toma Tomas, also known by his nom de guerre Abu Joseph, Assyrian politician and the leader of anti-government militias (al-Ansar) in northern Iraq during the 1960s and '70s.
- Sultan Hashim Ahmad al-Tai, Iraqi military commander who served as Iraqi Mister of defense between 1995 and 2003.
- Aras Habib
- Hussein Kamel al-Majid
- Bakr Sidqi
- Eliyahu Basrawi, Jewish doctor and military officer

=== Military figures of Iraqi origin ===
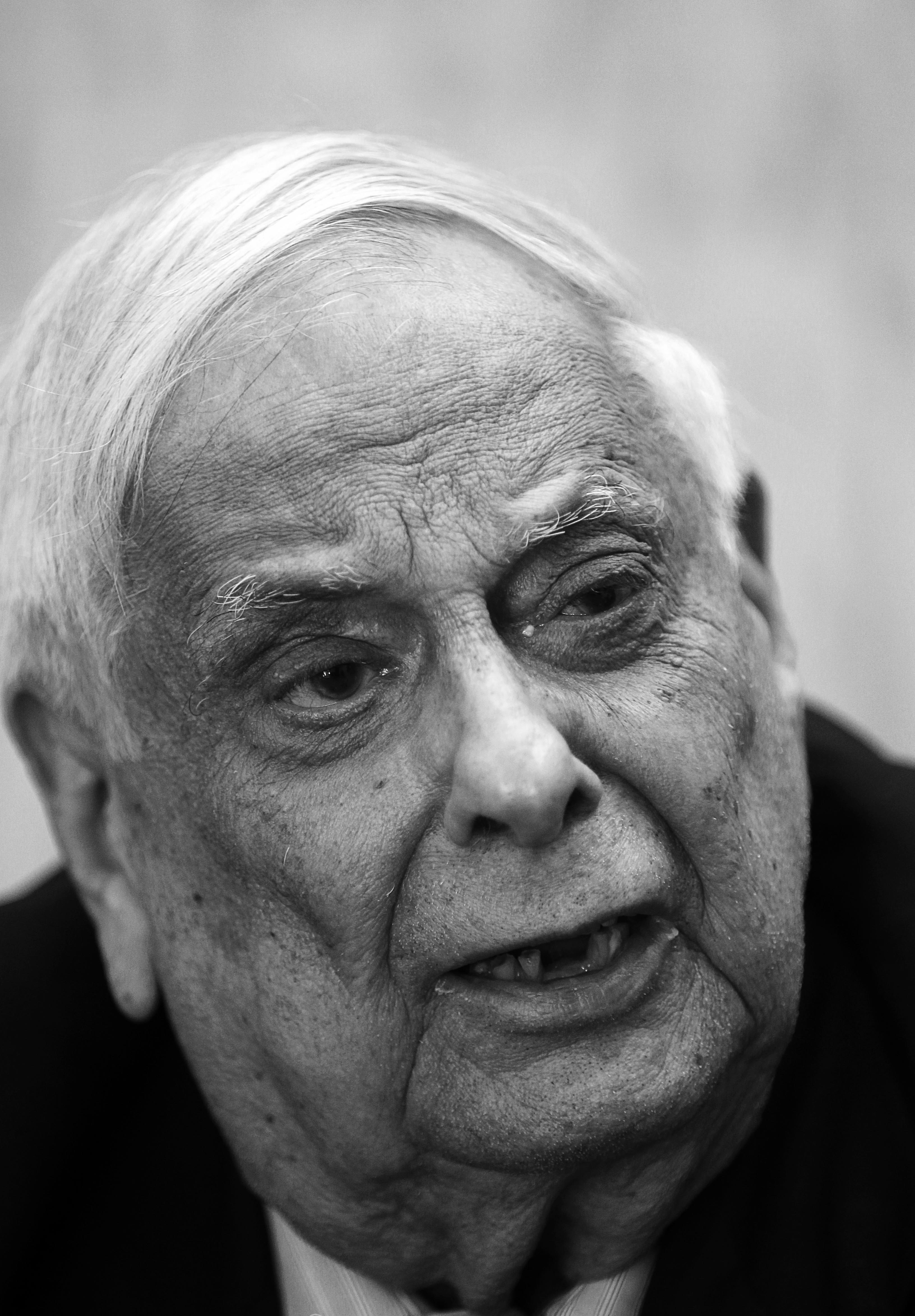
J. F. R. Jacob

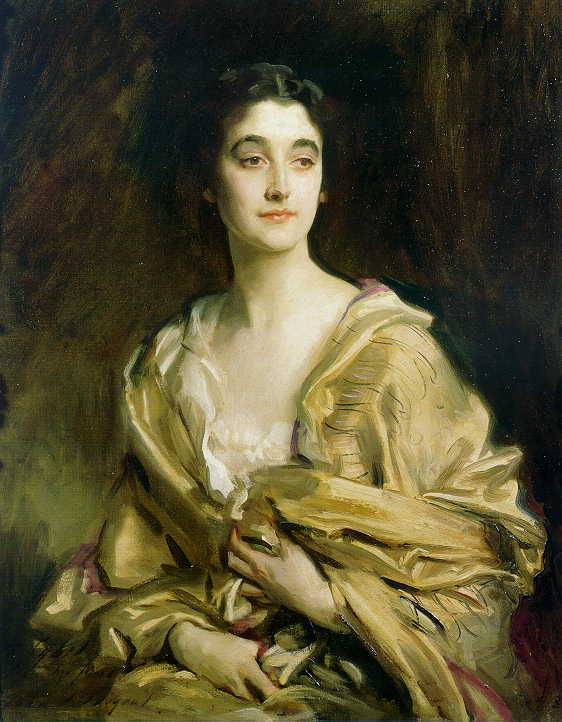
Sybil Sassoon, Marchioness of Cholmondeley

- J. F. R. Jacob (born 1923), retired Indian Army lieutenant general. He is best known for the role he played in India's victory in the Indo-Pakistan War of 1971 and the Liberation of Bangladesh. He also fought in World War II and the Indo-Pakistan War of 1965. He later served as the governor of the Indian states of Goa and Punjab. His family were Baghdadi Jews originally from Iraq who settled in Kolkata in the middle of the 18th century.
- Sybil Sassoon, Marchioness of Cholmondeley (30 January 1894, London – 26 December 1989, Cheshire), Chief Staff Officer to Director WRNS, WRNS HQ, Admiralty (HMS Pembroke III) from 12 November 1939 until 1946. On 9 February 1945 she was appointed as superintendent of the Women's Royal Naval Service (WRNS) and the following year was made CBE. She belonged to the prominent Sassoon and Rothschild families.

== Misc ==
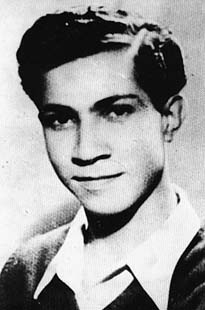
Moshe Barazani

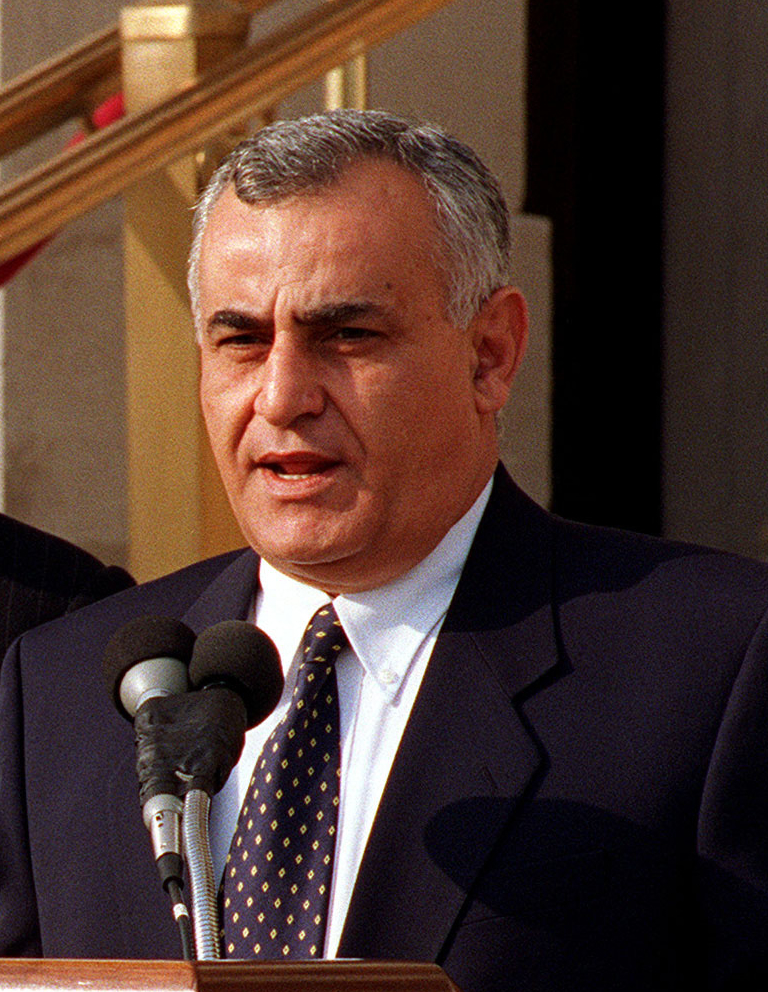
Yitzhak Mordechai

- Maria Theresa Asmar, known as Babylon's Princess in Europe, born in 1804 in Tel Keppe, Iraq, and died in France before the Franco-Prussian War, author of Memoirs of a Babylonian Princess, consisting of two volumes and 720 pages. This book was written in the early 19th century, describing her travels through Turkey, Syria, Lebanon, and Israel and the harem system used in Turkey.
- Dan Halutz, Israeli air force general
- Ibrahim Mohammed Khalil, Al Qaida operative in Germany
- Manisa Tarzanı, Tarzan of Manisa, pseudonym of Ahmet Bedewi (1899 Samarra, Iraq – 31 May 1963 in Manisa, Turkey). Living for 40 years on the mount Spil above Manisa, he is considered the first Turkish environmentalist.
- Moshe Levi (1936 – January 8, 2008), 12th Chief of Staff of the Israel Defense Forces, the first Chief of Staff of Iraqi origin.
- Zee M Kane (born 8 October 1982) to Iraqi father and English mother, Editor-in-Chief of the blog The Next Web, a Technorati Top 50 blog worldwide.
- Murad Meneshian (1936–2016), research chemist, journalist, translator, and researcher.
- Moshe Barazani (June 14, 1926 – April 21, 1947), Iraqi Kurdish Jew and a member of Lehi ("Freedom Fighters of Israel," aka the "Stern Gang").
- Yitzhak Mordechai, Israeli general and later Minister of Defense and Minister of Transport.
- Muayyed Nureddin, geologist
- Ibn Rajab, scholar
- Taban Shoresh, Iraqi Kurd, founder of The Lotus Flower charity
- Nadya Suleman, Nadya Denise Doud-Suleman (born Natalie Denise Suleman July 11, 1975), known as Octomom in the media, is an American woman who came to international attention when she gave birth to octuplets in January 2009. Suleman's father, Edward Doud Suleman, identified himself as a former Iraqi military man and said he would be returning to his native Iraq as a translator and driver in order to financially support his daughter and her fourteen children.

== Models, Miss Iraq and Beauty Pageant of Iraqi Descent ==
- Klodia Hanna, Assyrian model and singer
- Tara Fares, model and First Runner-up of Miss Iraq 2014
- Pramila (Esther Victoria Abraham), Indian actress, winner of the first Miss India contest in 1947
- Somy Ali, former Bollywood actress and now model and journalist (Iraqi mother and Pakistani father)
- Amy Fadhli, fitness model, actress and winner of the "Fitness America National Champion 1996" (Iraqi father and Czech mother)
- Viola Haqi, Dutch-Iraqi model
- Sarah Idan (born 1990), Iraqi Miss Universe contestant and the target of death threats after she took pictures with Israeli contestants.
- Renée Dangoor

== Musicians ==
- Mustafa Al-Abdullah, Iraqi musician and producer
- Dalshad Said, Dohuk-born, Iraqi Kurdish contemporary violinist, currently residing in Austria where he teaches music and violin.

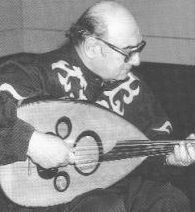
Munir Bashir

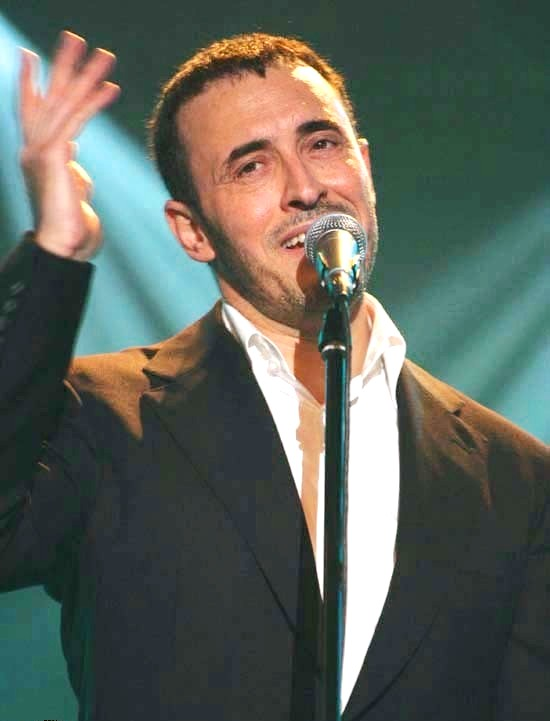
Kathem Al Saher

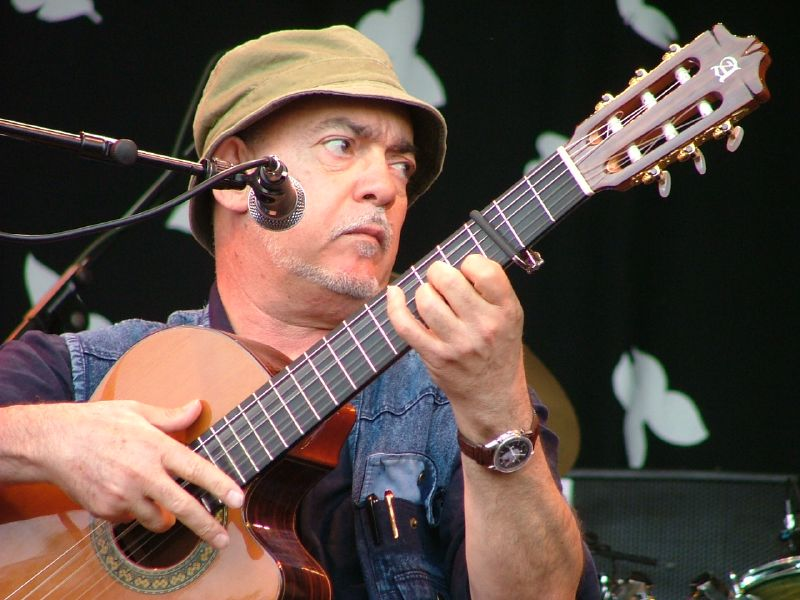
Ilham Al Madfai

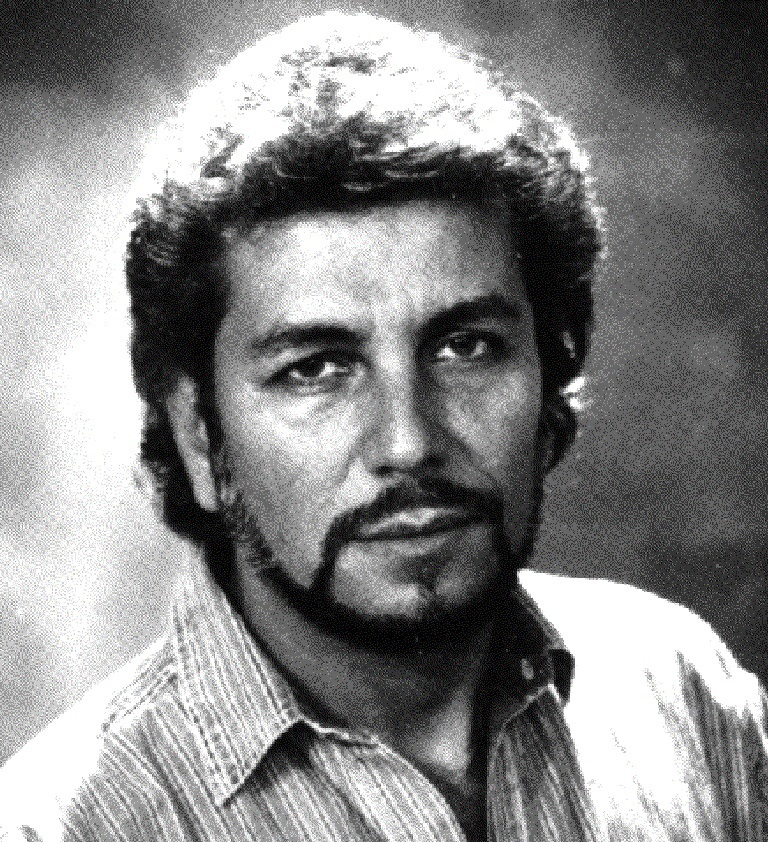
Ashur Bet Sargis

- Anwar Abdul Wahab (1946–), Iraqi singer.
- Ilham al-Madfai, Iraqi guitarist, singer and composer. al-Madfai's synthesis of Western guitar stylings with traditional Iraqi music has made him a popular performer in his native country and throughout the Middle East.
- Rida Al Abdullah, Iraqi singer. Born in 1966 in Baghdad, Iraq.
- Acrassicauda, Iraqi thrash metal band formed in 2001. Members are Faisal Talal, Tony Aziz, Firas Al-Lateef, Marwan Riyadh and James Al Ansari (assyrian)
- Nazem Al-Ghazali, one of the most popular singers in the history of Iraq and his songs are still heard by many in the Arab world.
- Rahim AlHaj, Iraqi American oud musician and composer.
- Basim al-karbalaie
- Hussam Al-Rassam
- Kathem Al Saher, one of the most successful Arab singers in the Arab world
- Ashur Bet Sargis, Assyrian singer
- Jamil Bachir
- Munir Bashir
- Zakaria Abdulla, Iraqi Kurdish pop music star.
- Seta Hagopian, famous Iraqi Armenian singer
- Klodia Hanna, singer and model
- Shatha Hassoun winner of Star Academy 4
- Bashar Lulua, orchestra conductor
- Majid Al Muhandis, Iraqi singer, was born in Baghdad, Iraq, and after his birth moved to live in Kuwait, Jahra Province. He lived there until the Iraqi invasion into Kuwait, and studied engineering, hence the title Majid "Al Muhandis (المهندس)," which means "The Engineer" in Arabic.
- Ahmed Mukhtar
- Beatrice Ohanessian (1927–2008), Iraqi pianist, notable for being Iraq's first concert pianist and first female composer. (Born in Baghdad, of Armenian origin).
- Salima Pasha (1904–1974), well known Iraqi Jewish singer and dubbed as the most famous female singer since the early 1930s. She married fellow Iraqi singer and actor Nazem Al-Ghazali.
- Hanna Petros (1896–1958), Iraqi Assyrian composer and scholar, wrote numerous books and treatises over oriental music, Iraqi Maqams and Syriac hymnody.
- Janan Sawa, Iraqi Assyrian singer
- Linda George, Iraqi Assyrian singer
- Ashur Bet Sargis (Assyrian-Iraqi Singer)
- Naseer Shamma, renowned Iraqi musician and oud player.
- Salman Shukur
- Motez, electronic music producer and DJ
- Sahar Taha, singer and artist
- Zaidoon Treeko (1961–), Mandaean Oud player, composer, and poet
- Unknown to No One, boyband
- Haitham Yousif, popular Iraqi singer
- Mansour Zalzal
- Ziryab
- Tara Jaff, Iraqi Kurdish musician. She founded Zipang, a storytelling group which focuses on stories from ancient Mesopotamia.
- Muhammad al-Qubanchi, famous Iraqi maqamist
- Yousuf Omar, famous Iraqi maqamist
- Maeda Nazhat, Iraqi singer, she was active between 1950s and 1980s through her work in radio, TV and with the Iraqi Heritage Music Orchestra.

=== Musicians of Iraqi descent ===
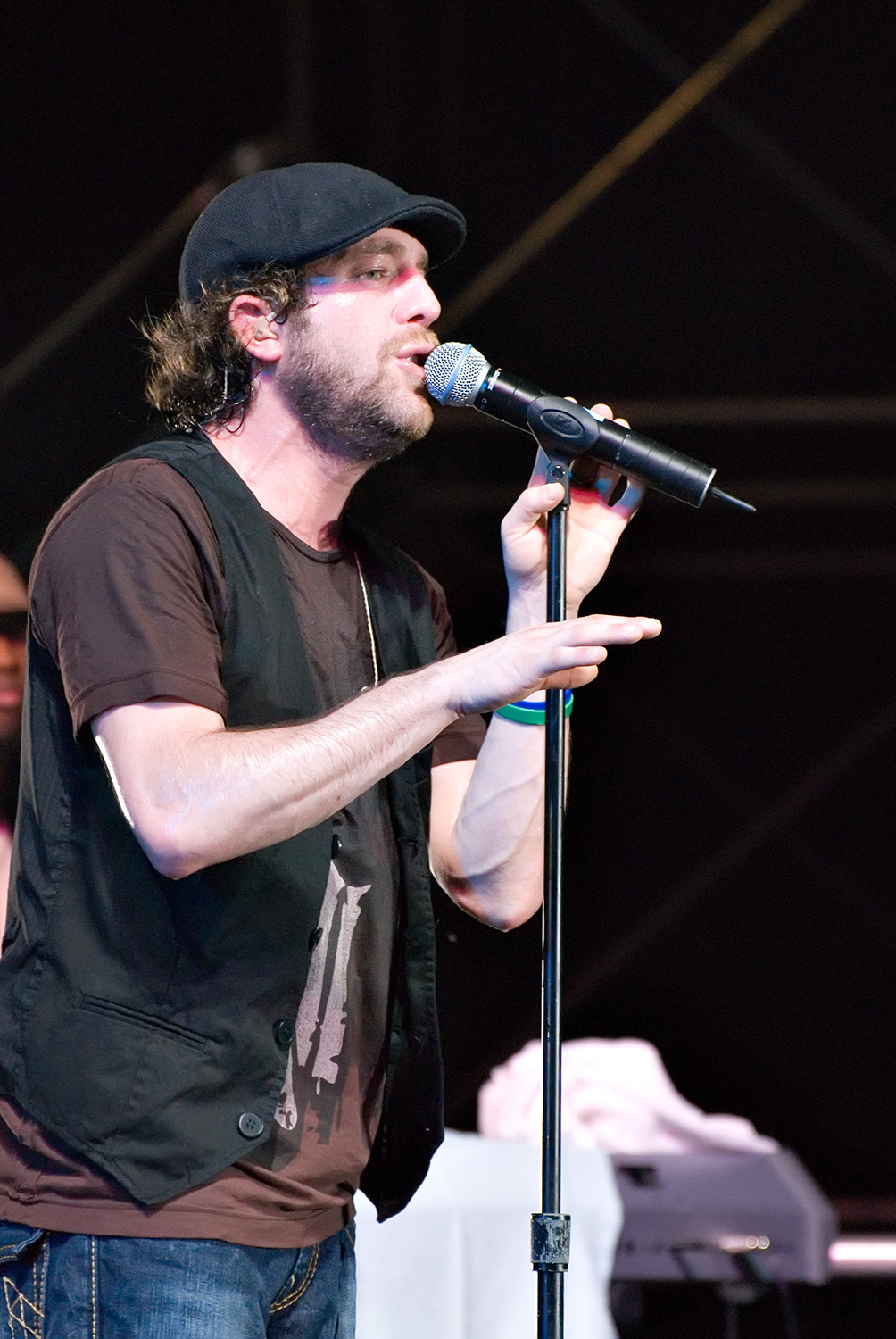
Elliott Yamin

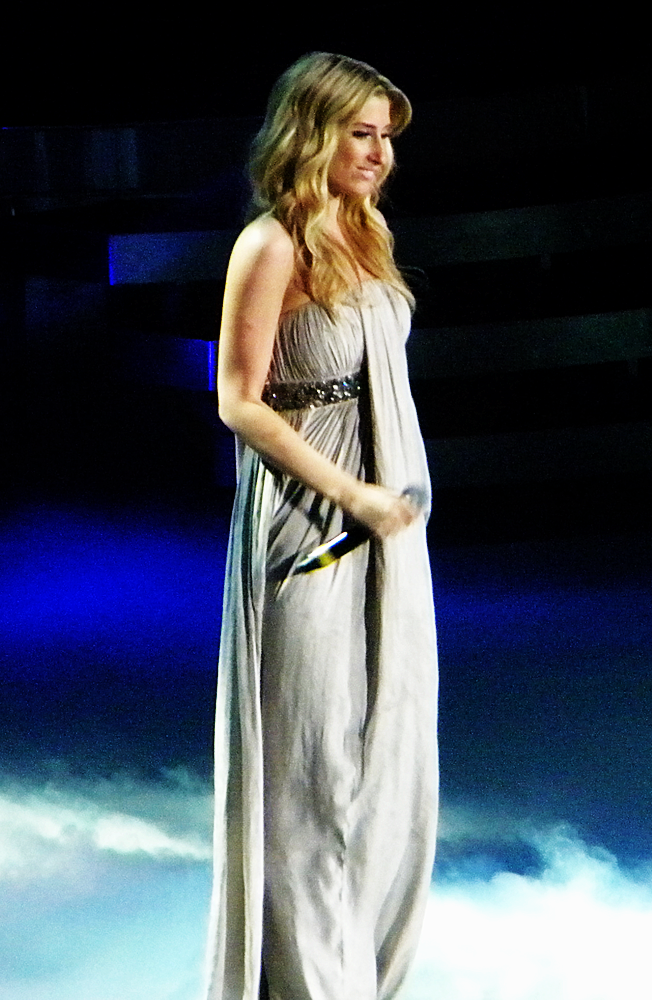
Stacey Solomon

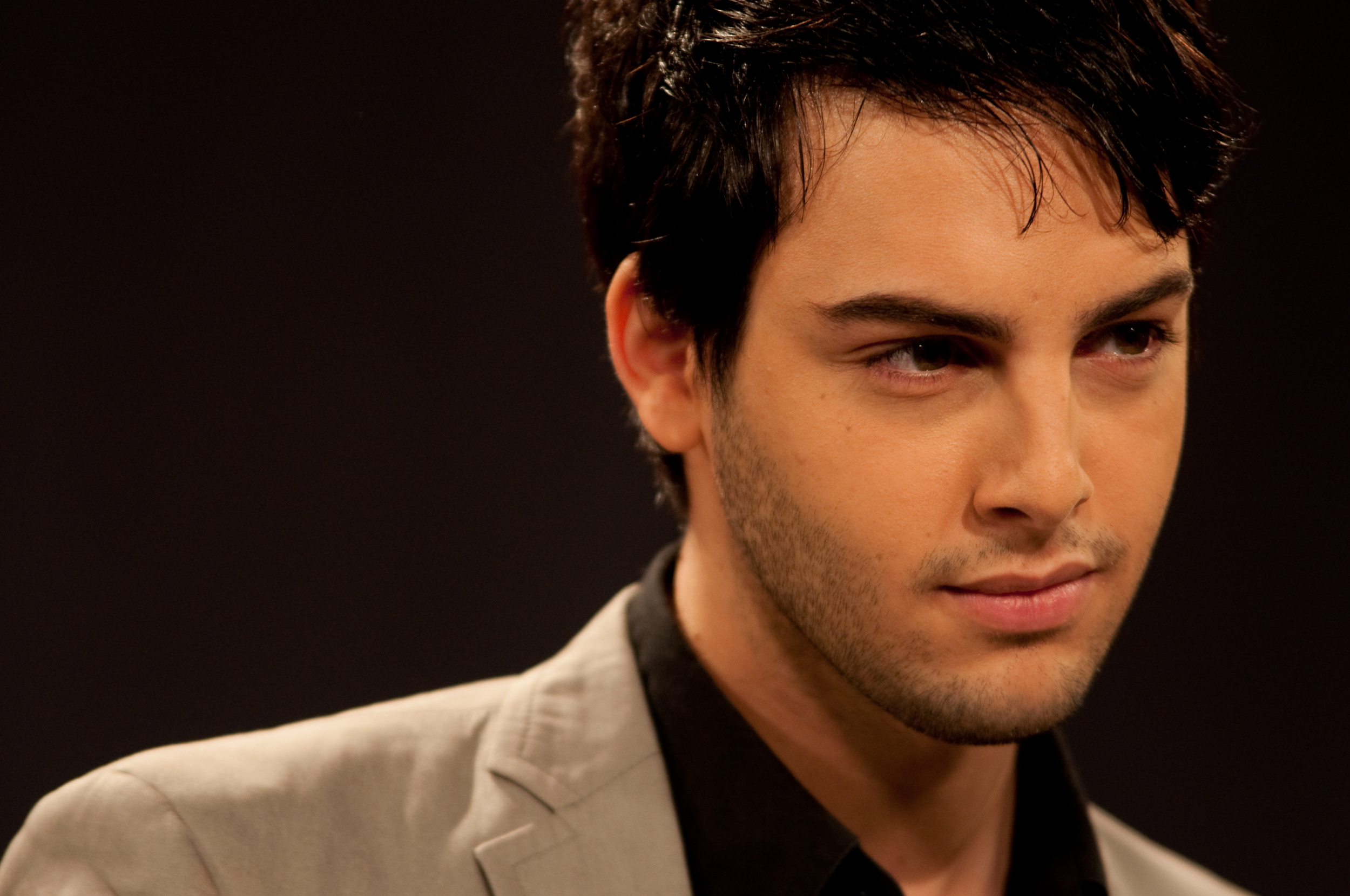
Darin

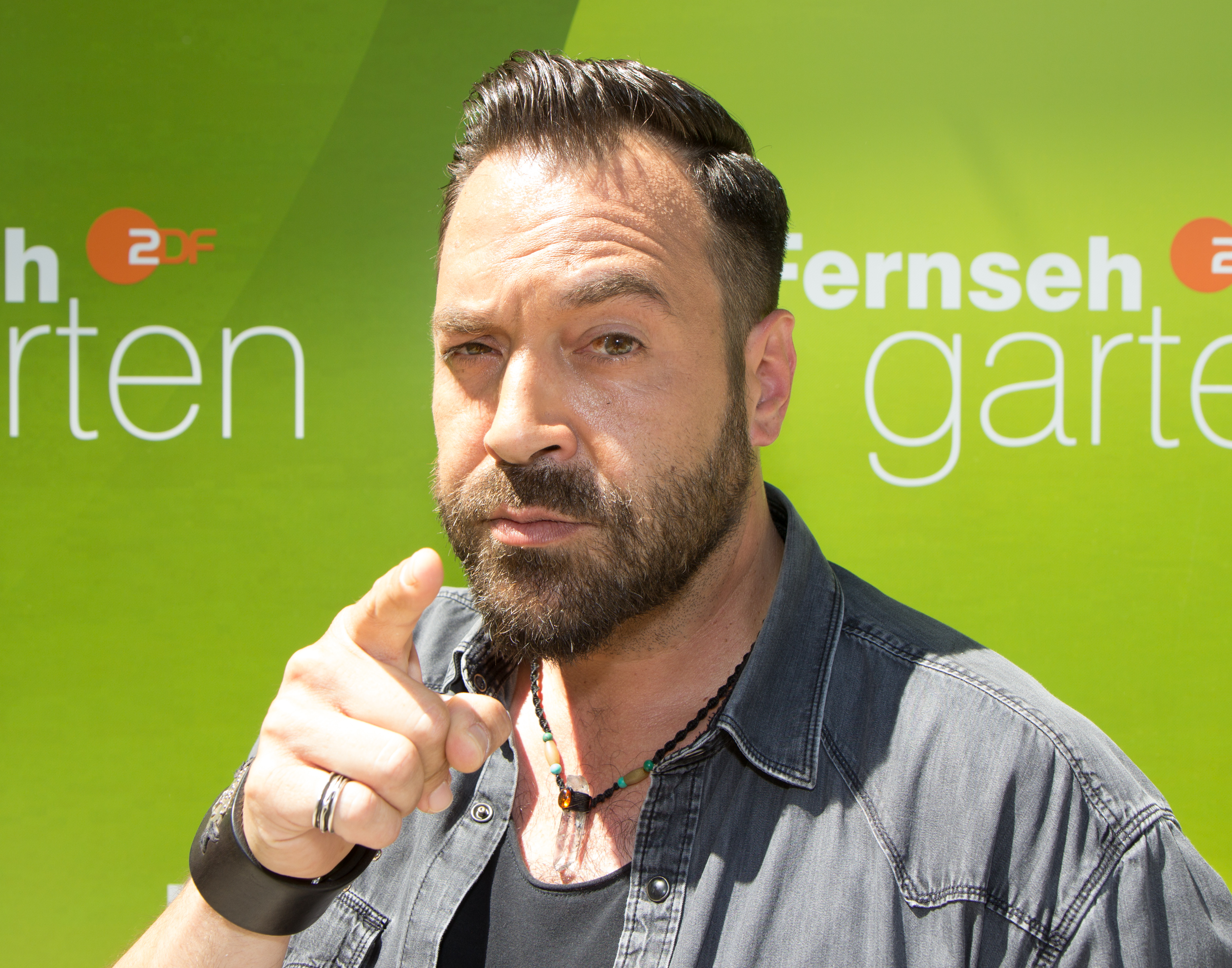
Laith Al-Deen

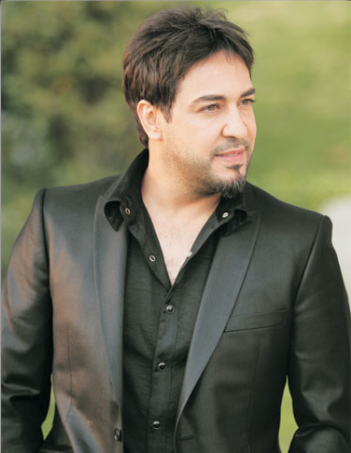
Rida Al Abdullah

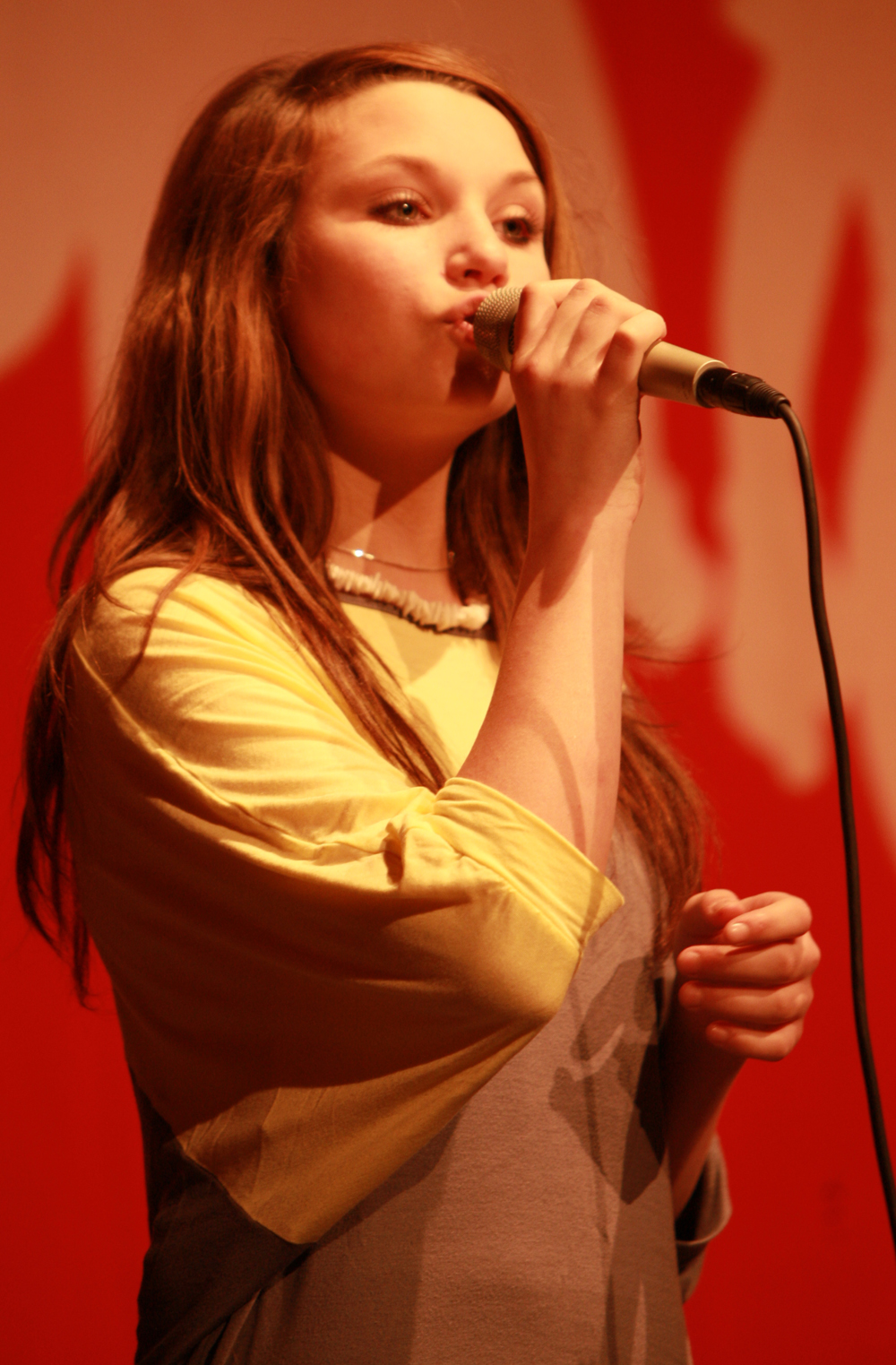
Nora Foss al-Jabri

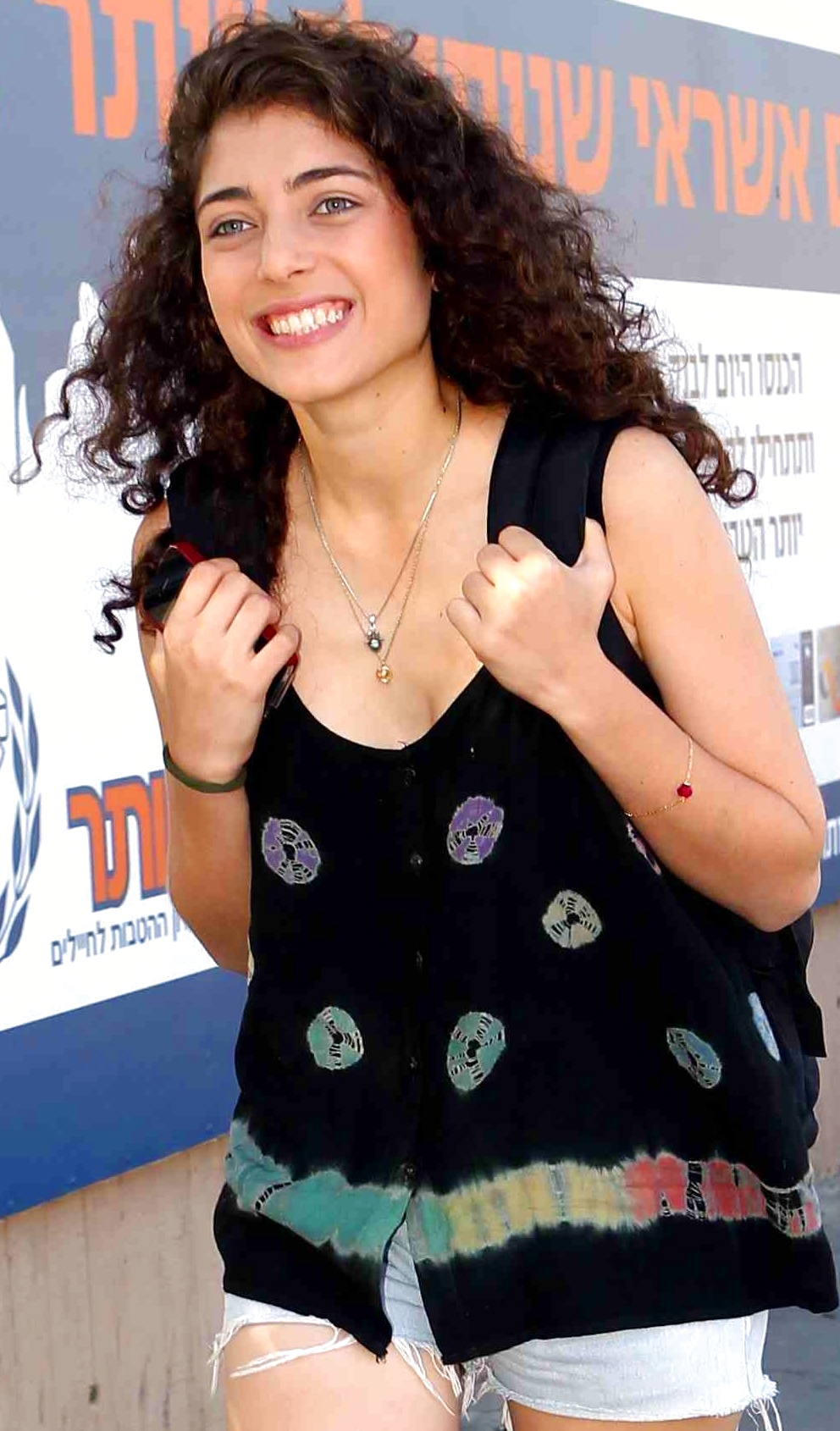
Roni Dalumi

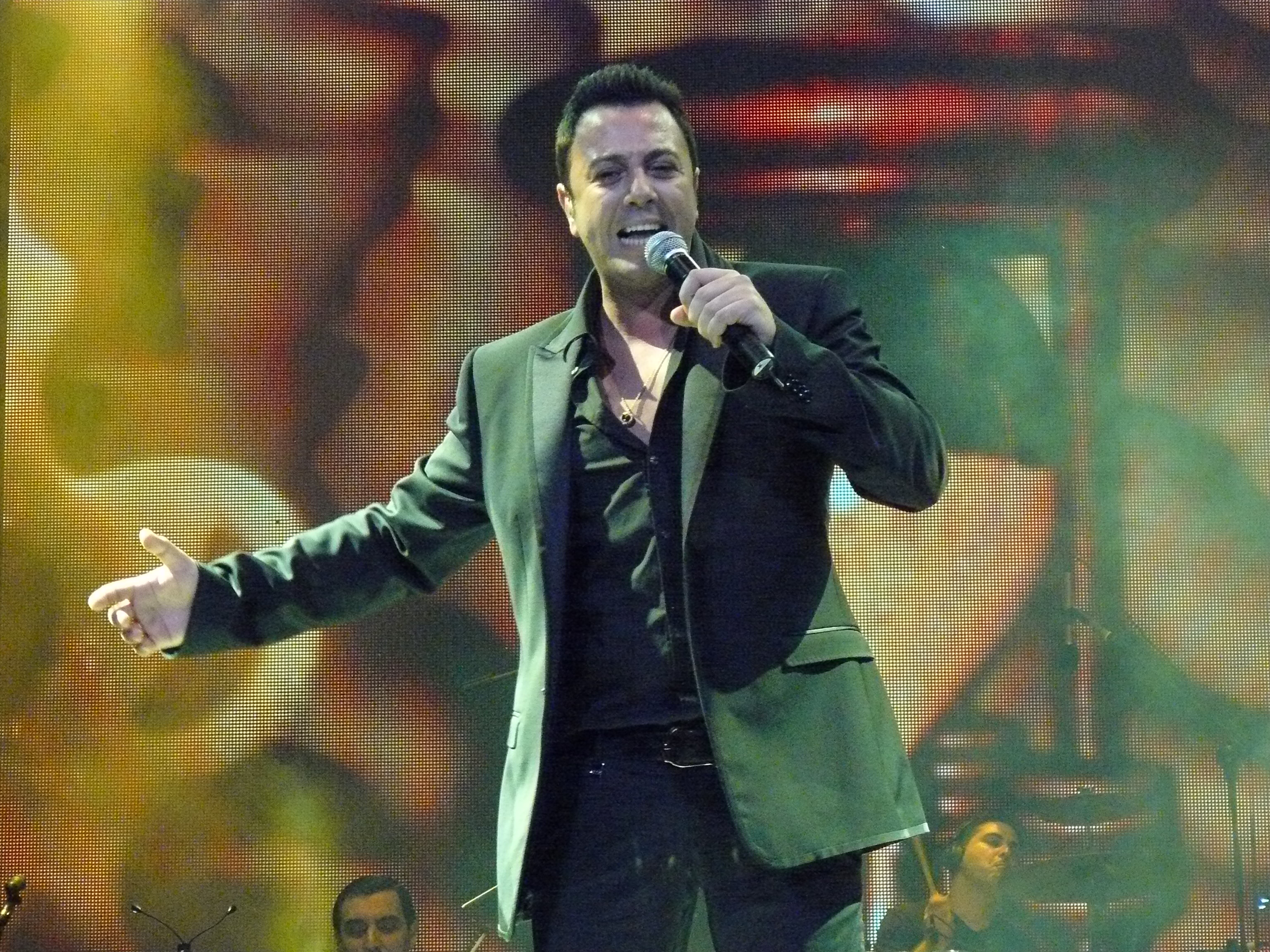
Lior Narkis

- Moshe Peretz (born 10 May 1983), Israeli Mizrahi Pop singer-songwriter and composer. He is also currently serving as a judge for the first season of The X Factor Israel. He was born to a Moroccan father and an Iraqi mother.
- Rami Fortis (born July 7, 1954), or simply Fortis, Israeli rock singer. Born in Tel Aviv. Fortis is of Italian Jewish and Iraqi Jewish origin.
- Lior Narkis (born November 8, 1976, in Holon, Israel), male Israeli singer. He was born to a mixed Iraqi and Serbian Jewish family.
- Yair Dalal, Israeli musician of Iraqi-Jewish descent
- Elliott Yamin, Efraym Elliott Yamin (born July 20, 1978), American singer known for his hit single "Wait for You" and placing third on the fifth season of American Idol. Yamin was born in Los Angeles, California, to father Shaul Yamin, an Israeli Jew of Iraqi Jewish descent, and mother Claudette Goldberg Yamin, an American of Jewish descent.
- Stacey Solomon (born 4 October 1989), English singer, television presenter and reality TV star. Solomon was born in Dagenham, East London, the daughter of Fiona (née Nash), a nurse, and David Solomon, a photographer. Her father is from a Jewish family that had immigrated to England from Iraq and Poland.
- Omar Bashir (musician) (born in 1970), Iraqi Hungarian Musician. His father, Munir Bashir, was considered to be the supreme master of the Arab maqamat scale system
- Robin Ghosh (born 1939 in Baghdad, Iraq), Bangladeshi musician and music composer
- Brian Elias (born 30 August 1948, Bombay, now Mumbai, India), British composer
- Hanan Alattar, American soprano opera singer
- Laith Al-Deen, German pop musician
- Farida Mohammad Ali, singer
- Nora Foss al-Jabri, Norwegian child singer
- Saleh and Daoud Al-Kuwaity
- Inbar Bakal, Israeli singer-songwriter of mixed Iraqi and Yemeni descent
- Bruno Coulais, composer
- Yair Dalal
- Amir ElSaffar
- Munir Bashir, musician
- Juliana Jendo, singer
- Klodia Hanna, singer
- Ashur Bet Sargis, singer
- Lowkey, British-Iraqi rapper
- Narcy, Iraqi-Canadian rapper
- Aida Nadeem, Iraqi-Danish musician
- Esma Redžepova, Romani Macedonian vocalist, songwriter, and humanitarian; her grandfather was an Iraqi Jew
- Shlomo, human beatbox and member of UK-hip hop act, Foreign Beggars
- TIMZ, Iraqi-American rapper
- Naufalle Al Wahab, musician and rapper, founder of the band Aïwa, appeared on The Dictator (soundtrack)
- Wamid Al Wahab, musician, founder of the band Aïwa
- Elliott Yamin
- Daron Malakian (born July 18, 1975), Armenian-American singer-songwriter.
- Roni Dalumi (born September 15, 1991), Israeli singer, won the final of Kochav Nolad 7 contest in August 2009
- Darin or Darin Zanyar (born June 2, 1987, in Stockholm, Sweden), more commonly known as Darin, a Swedish, Kurdish pop singer-songwriter of Iraqi Kurdish descent.
- Loris Ohannes Chobanian (born April 17, 1933, to Armenian parents in Mosul, Iraq), Armenian-American composer of classical music.
- Khyam Allami

== Patriarchs ==
- Ignatius Peter IV (1798–1895) 116th Patriarch of Syriac Orthodox Church from 1872 to 1895
- Ignatius Aphrem I (1887–1957) 120th Patriarch of Syriac Orthodox Church from 1933 to 1957
- Ignatius Yacoub III (1913–1980) 121st Patriarch of Syriac Orthodox Church from 1957 to 1980
- Ignatius Zakka I (1931–2014) 122nd Patriarch of Syriac Orthodox Church from 1980 to 2014
- Ignatius Antony I Samheri (1801–1864) Patriarch of the Syriac Catholic Church from 1853 to 1864

== Physicians and surgeons ==
- Abd al-Latif al-Baghdadi
- Abdulahad AbdulNour, physician, humanitarian, elected to Council of Representatives of Iraq in 1937 and 1947.
- Hanna Khayat
- Munjed Al Muderis, Iraqi born Australian orthopaedic surgeon pioneering robotic limb technology for amputees
- Bukhtishu, Christian physician
- Esagil-kin-apli, Babylonian ummânū, or chief scholar, author of the Diagnostic Handbook, Sakikkū (SA.GIG)
- Ibn Hubal
- Hunayn ibn Ishaq (Hunayn bar Ishaq), Christian physician
- Al-Kindi
- Ibn Kammuna Sa'd ibn Mansur (Izz Al-dawla) Ibn Kammuna (d.1284), 13th Century Jewish physician, philosopher and critic of Islam who lived under the rule of the Mongols in Baghdad
- Eliyahu Basrawi, military doctor

== Politicians ==
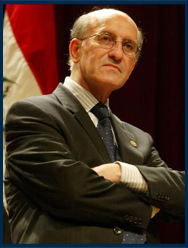
Sinan Al Shabibi

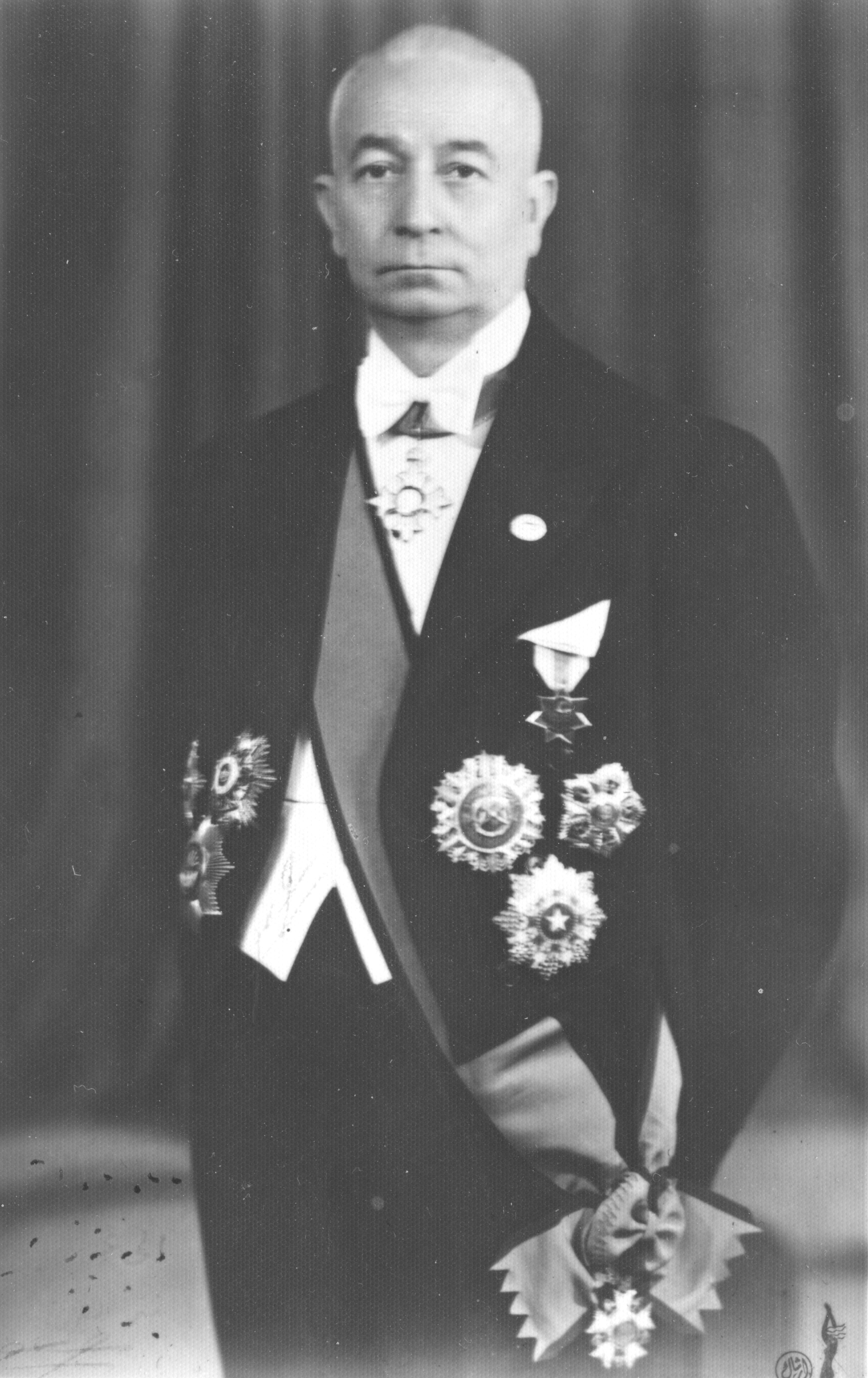
Arshad Al-Umari

- Thabit AbdulNour, Iraqi politician, member of the Council of Representatives of Iraq in 1925 and 1930, diplomat
- Mithal al-Alusi (born 1953), Iraqi politician and parliamentarian.
- Sinan Al Shabibi, Iraqi economist who served as the governor of the Central Bank of Iraq from September 2003 to October 2012.
- Nuri al-Said (1888–July 15, 1958), Iraqi politician during the British Mandate and during the Kingdom of Iraq. He served in various key cabinet positions, and served seven terms as Prime Minister of Iraq.
- Sharif Ali bin al-Hussein, was born in 1956, in Baghdad, Iraq. He is currently the leader of the Iraqi Constitutional Monarchy political party and claims to be the legitimate heir to the position of King of Iraq, based on his relationship to the last monarch, the late King Faisal II.
- Abd al-Rahman al-Bazzaz (1913–1973), politician, reformist, and writer. He was a pan-Arab nationalist and served as the Dean of Baghdad Law College and later as Prime Minister of Iraq.
- Arshad al-Umari, was born in Mosul, Iraq on April 8, 1888. He was the 28th and 41st Prime Minister of Iraq.
- Naji al-Suwaydi (1882–1942), Iraqi politician who served as prime minister from November 1929 to March 1930.
- Talib al-Naqib, known Iraqi politician, who became the first Minister of Interior in Iraq (1920–1921)
- Ahmad Abdul Razak Al Amer (1914–1996), Lawyer, Mayor and member of Parliament (1948–1958)
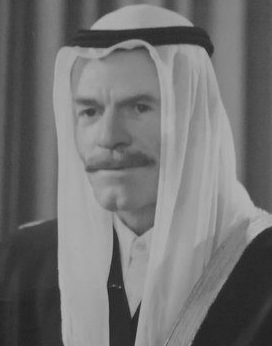
  Izzat Ibrahim al-Douri
- Khudayer Abbas, Iraqi politician who served as Minister of Health in the Interim Iraq Governing Council, which was set up after the 2003 US invasion of Iraq.
- Muhammad Fadhel al-Jamali, Iraqi politician who served as Iraq's prime minister from 1953 to 1954, and foreign minister from 1946 to 1948.
- Izzat Ibrahim al-Douri, Iraqi politician and military general. He served as vice President of Iraq from 1979 to 2003.
- Haidar al-Abbadi, Iraqi politician who served as Prime Minister from 2014 to 2018.
- Adil Abdul-Mahdi, Iraqi politician who served as Prime Minister between 2018 and his resignation in 2020 after a wave of protests. He also served as vice president (2005–2011), Minister of Finance (2004–2005) and Minister of Oil (2014–2016).
- Ali Jawdat al-Aiyubi Iraqi politician who served as Prime Minister from 1934 to 1935, 1949–1950, and in the latter half of 1957.
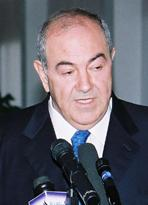
- Iyad Allawi
  Mohammed A. Aldouri, Iraqi diplomat who served as the representative of Iraq to the United Nations from 2001 to 2003.
- Iyad Allawi, Iraqi politician who served as Prime Minister of Iraq in the Iraqi Interim Government from 2004 to 2005 and as vice president from 2014 to 2015 and 2016–2018.
- Alaudin Abdul-Saheb al-Alwan, Iraqi politician who served as Minister of Health in the Iraqi Interim Government.
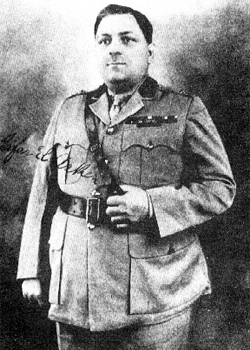
- Jafar al Askari
  Ja'far al-Askari (1885–1936), Iraqi politician who served twice as prime minister of Iraq: from November 22, 1923, to August 3, 1924; and from November 21, 1926, to December 31, 1927.
- Nori al-Badran, Iraqi politician who served as Minister of Interior in the Iraqi Interim Government.
- Ahmed al-Barak, Iraqi politician and lawyer who served as part of the Interim Iraq Governing Council.
- Abd ar-Rahman al-Bazzaz, Iraqi politician and academic who served as prime minister of Iraq between 1965 and 1966. He also served as the dean for Baghdad Law College before his political appointment.
- Naseer al-Chaderchi, Iraqi politician who served as part of the Interim Iraq Governing Council.
- Kamil Mubdir al-Gailani, Minister of Finance in the Interim Iraq Governing Council.
- Ali Faik al-Ghadban, Minister of Youth and sport in the Interim Iraq Governing Council.
- Mohammed Shakir al-Ghanam, Iraqi politician and leading member of the Iraqi Islamic Party.
- Mahdi al-Hafidh, Minister of Planning in the Interim Iraq Governing Council.
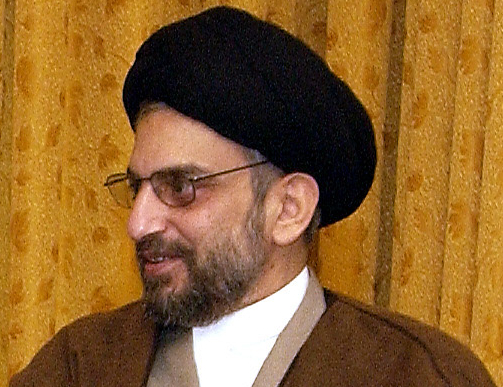
  Abdul Aziz al-Hakim
- Ali Al-Haidri, Iraqi politician who served as the governor of Baghdad between 2004 and his assassination in 2005.
- Abdul Aziz al-Hakim, Iraqi politician and religious leader from the Hakim family, he served as the President of the Interim Iraq Governing Council.
- Abdul Razak al-Hashimi, Iraqi politician and diplomat, he served as Minister of Higher Education, and senior advisor to Saddam Hussein.
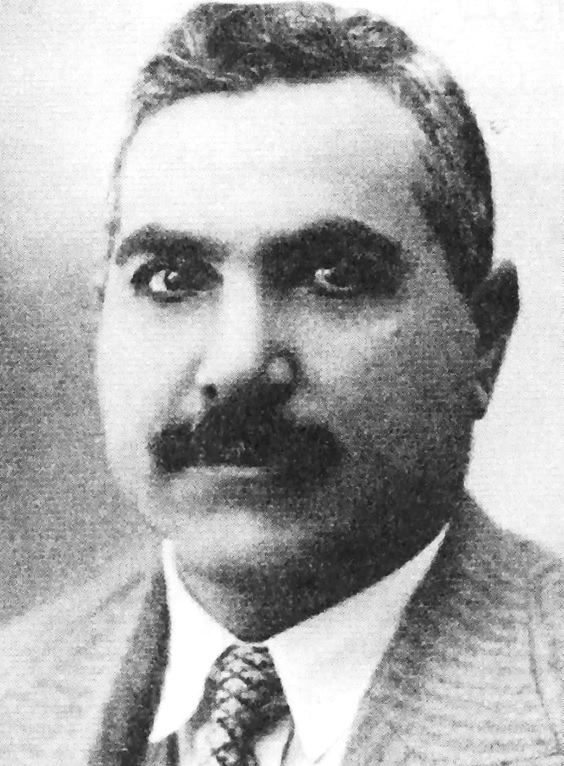
- Yasin al-Hashimi
  Aqila al-Hashimi, Iraqi politician who served in the Interim Iraq Governing Council, she served for few months only and was assassinated in September 2003.
- Yasin al-Hashimi, Iraqi politician and military officer who served as Prime Minister of Iraq twice between 1924–1925 and 1935–1936.
- Taha al-Hashimi, Iraqi politician who served as Prime Minister of Iraq between 3 February 1941 – 2 May 1941.
- Hajim al-Hassani, Iraqi politician who served as the speaker of the Iraqi National Assembly.
- Ibrahim al-Jaafari, Iraqi politician who served as Prime Minister of Iraq in the Iraqi Transitional Government from 2005 – 2006.
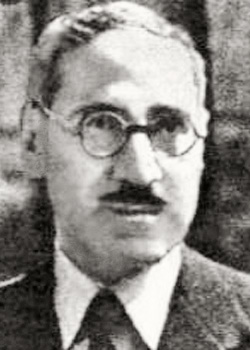
  Rashid Ali al-Gaylani
- Mofeed Mohammed Jawad al-Jazaeri, Minister of Culture in the Interim Iraq Governing Council.
- Rashid Ali al-Gaylani, Iraqi politician who served as Prime Minister of Iraq from March to November 1933, March 1940 – February 1941 and from April to May 1941.
- Abd al-Rahman al-Haydari al-Gillani, Iraqi politician who played a prominent role in both Ottoman and the British eras of Iraqi history, He served as the first prime minister of the kingdom of Iraq from 1920 to 1922.
- Salama al-Khufaji, Iraqi politician and academic who served in the Interim Iraq Governing Council.
- Raja Habib al-Khuzaai, Iraqi politician and doctor who served in the Interim Iraq Governing Council.
- Pascal Esho Warda, Iraqi Assyrian politician who served as Minister of Immigration and Refugees between 2004 – 2005.
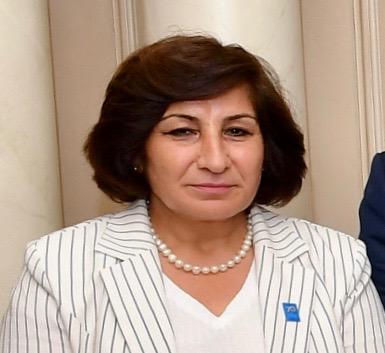
  Pascal Esho Warda
- Huda Salih Mahdi Ammash, Iraqi politician and academic who served as a member of the Revolutionary Command Council. As a senior Baath Party member she was the only women on the Most-wanted Iraqi playing cards deck, though she was released without charges in 2005 after her capture in 2003.
- Ali Abdul-Amir Allawi, Iraqi politician and author who served in several high government positions including Deputy Prime Minister (2020–2022), Finance Minister 2003–2004 and Minister of Defense (April – June 2004).
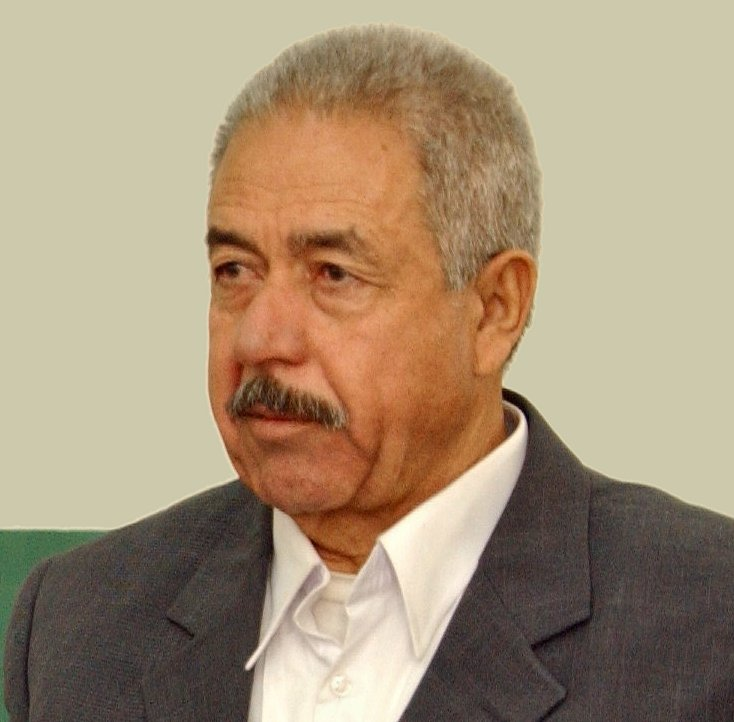
- Ali Hassan al-Majid
  Ali Hassan al-Majid, Iraqi politician and military officer who served in several high government positions including Director of General Security (1984–1987), Minister of Defense (1991–1995) and Minister of interior (March – April 1991)
- Sami Izara al-Majoun, Iraqi politician who served as minister of Labor and Social Affairs in the Interim Iraq Governing Council.
- Nouri al-Maliki, Iraqi politician who served as the Prime Minister of Iraq between 2006–2014 and vice president between 2014 -2018.He is also the head of the Islamic Dawa Party since 2007.
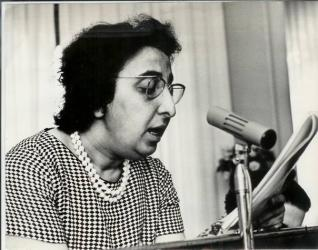
- Naziha al-Dulaimi
  Naziha al-Dulaimi, Iraqi politician and feminist activist who served as Minister of Municipalities in the 1959 cabinet. She best known for being the first Iraqi women to serve as a minister.
- Jamil al-Midfai, Iraqi politician and revolutionary who served as Prime Minister in five separate cabinets between (1933–1953).
- Abdel-Karim Mahoud al-Mohammedawi, Iraqi politician who served as a member of the Interim Iraq Governing Council.
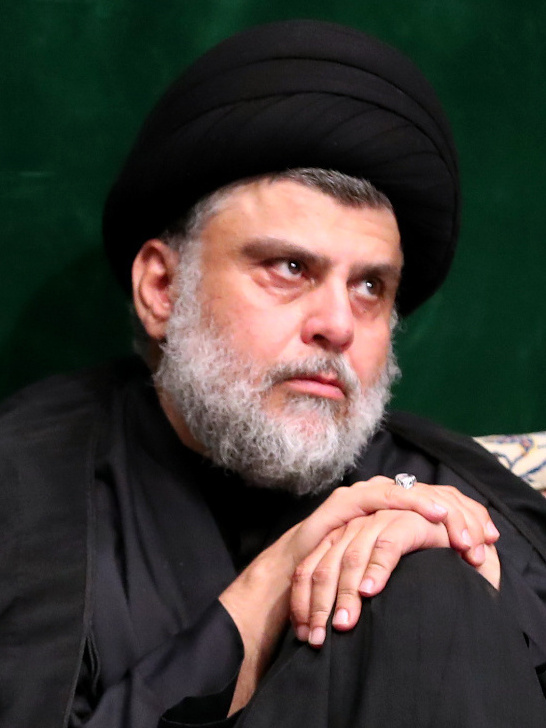
- Muqtada al-Sadr
  Rashid al-Rifai, Iraqi politician and diplomat, who had several posts as minister in different ministries between 1968 and 1975, then served as Iraqi ambassador Belgium, China and Japan.
- Mowaffak al-Rubaie, Iraqi politician and parliamentarian who served as National Security Advisor between 2005 and 2009.
- Muqtada al-Sadr, Iraqi politician and religious leader. He is a member of the prominent Shia cleric al-Sadr family and the leader of the Sadrist Movement, which include a number of parliamentarians and government ministers. Muqtada has also lead several militias throughout the years such as the Mahdi Army and Saraya al-Salam.
- Muhammad Saeed al-Sahhaf, Iraqi politician and diplomat, he served as Minister of Foreign Affairs (1992–2001). And Minister of Information from 2001 until the 2003 invasion of Iraq.
- Ayham al-Samaraie, Iraqi politician who served as Minister of Electricity from between 2003 and 2005.
- Hussain al-Shahristani, Iraqi politician who served as Minister of Oil (2006–2010), Minister of higher Education (2014–2016) and Deputy Prime Minister (2010–2014).
- Hashim Abdul-Rahman al-Shibli, Iraqi politician who served as the Justice Minister from 2006 to 2007.
- Abd al-Muhsin as-Sa'dun (1879–November 13, 1929), Iraqi politician who served as Prime Minister of Iraq on four separate occasions between 1922 and 1929.

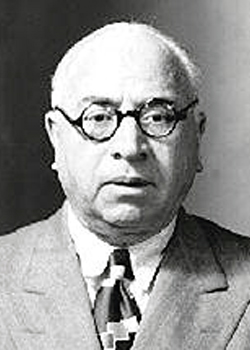
Tawfiq al Suwaidi

- Tawfiq al-Suwaidi (1892–October 15, 1968), Iraqi politician who served as Prime Minister of Iraq on three occasions stretching from 1929 to 1950.
- Rafi' Dahham Al-Tikriti, Chief Iraqi Intelligence Service
- Barzan Ibrahim al-Tikriti, Iraqi politician who served as head of the Iraqi intelligence service (Mukhabarat) in Saddam Hussain's government.
- Sabawi Ibrahim al-Tikriti, Iraqi politician who served as director for Directorate of General Security from 1991 to 1996, and as a presidential advisor to Saddam Hussein.
- Watban Ibrahim al-Tikriti, Iraqi politician who served as Minister of Interior between 1991 and 1995.
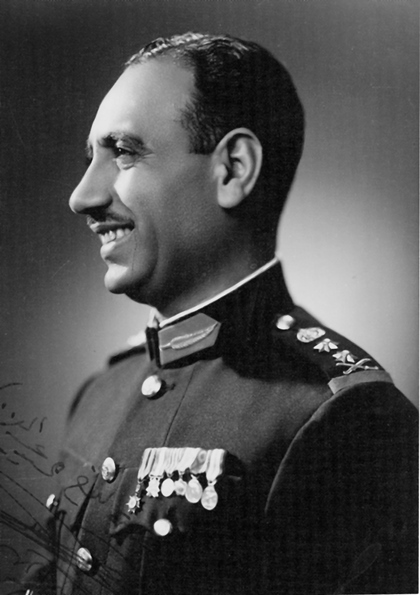
  Abdul Salam Arif
- Mohammed Bahr al-Uloum, Iraqi politician and figure and religious leader who served as the President of the Iraqi Governing Council in 2003.
- Ibrahim Mohamed Bahr al-Uloum, Iraqi politician and academic who served twice as Minister of Oil (2003–2005)
- Ghazi Mashal Ajil al-Yawer, Iraqi politician who served as vice president in the Iraqi Transitional Government in 2006.
- Dara Noor Alzin, Iraqi Kurdish politician and judge who served as the Minister of Justice between 2008 and 2010.
- Abdul Rahman Arif, Iraqi politician and military officer who served as president of Iraq between 1966 and 1968.
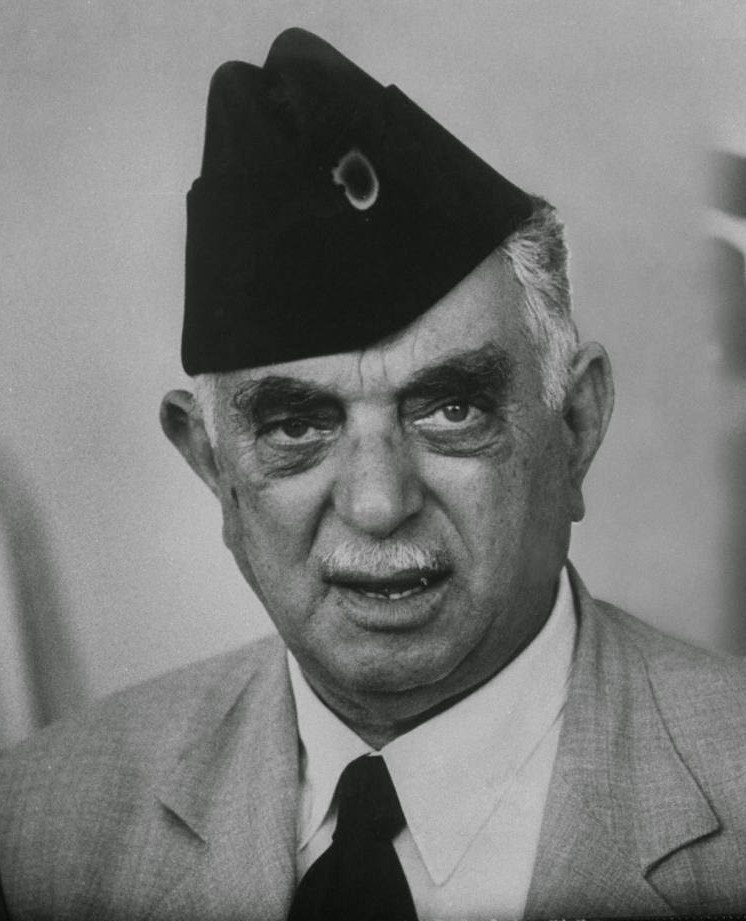
  Nuri al-Said
- Abdul Salam Arif, Iraqi politician and military officer who served as president of Iraq from 1963 until his death in plane crash in 1968.
- Muhammad Najib ar-Ruba'i, Iraqi politician and military officer who served as president of Iraq between 1958 and 1963. He was one of the leaders of the 14 July revolution.
- Nuri as-Said, Iraqi politician who served as prime minister of Iraq for 8 terms between 1930 and his death in 1958. He was captured and executed when the monarchy was overthrown by the 14 July revolution.
- Zeyad Abdul-Razzaq Mohammed Aswad, Iraqi politician and academic who served as minister of Higher Education in the Interim Iraq Governing Council.
- Tariq Aziz, Mikhail Yuhanna baptized Manuel Christo; born 28 April 1936, was the foreign minister (1983–1991) and deputy prime minister (1979–2003) of Iraq and a close advisor of former President Saddam Hussein. He is in fact an ethnic Assyrian, and a member of the Chaldean Catholic Church.
- Salaheddin Bahaaeddin, Iraqi Kurdish politician who served on the Iraqi Governing Council between 2003 and 2004. He is also a co-founder and Secretary-General of the Kurdistan Islamic Union.
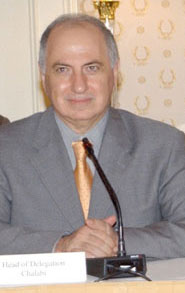
- Ahmed Chalabi
  Massoud Barzani, Iraqi Kurdish politician who served as President of the Kurdistan Region of Iraq from 2005 to 2017.
- Nesreen Mustafa Sidiq Berwari, Iraqi Kurdish politician who served as Minister of Municipalities and Public Works between 2003 and 2006.
- Ahmed Chalabi (1944–2015), Iraqi politician who served as interim oil minister in Iraq in . He is best known as the founder and the Iraqi National Congress which was an Iraqi coalition formed in opposition to the Saddam Hussain government and played a role in shaping US policy toward Iraq between the 1st Gulf War and the 2003 invasion of Iraq.
- Sondul Chapouk, Iraqi Turkmen politician who served as part of the Interim Iraq Governing Council.
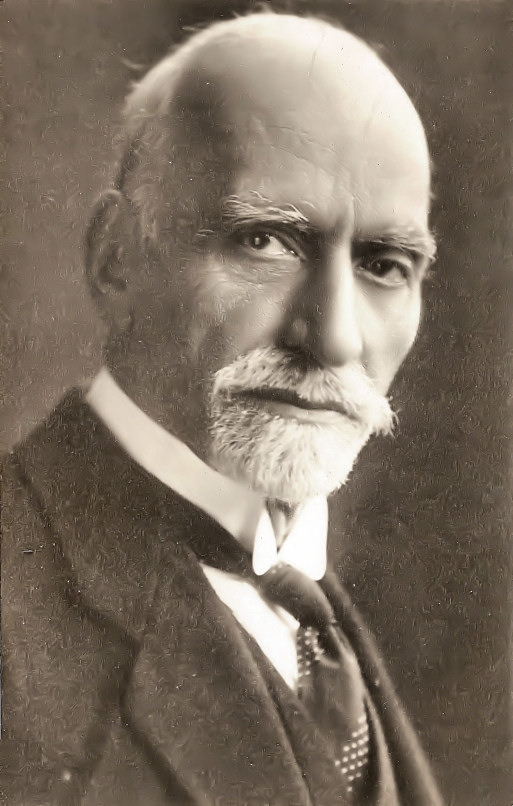
- Sir Sassoon Eskell
  Sassoon Eskell, Iraqi politician and parliamentarian who served as the first Minister of Finance in the Kingdom of Iraq. He is considered one of the most influential politician in the monarchy era of Iraqi history as he established many of the laws and financial structure of that time.
- Ali Fadel, Iraqi politician and athlete who served as Governor of Baghdad between December 2004 and January 2005.
- Mohsen Abdel Hamid, Iraqi politician and religious scholar who served as a member and president (for one month) of the Interim Iraq Governing Council.
- Hatem Kamil, deputy governor of Baghdad who was assassinated in 2004.
- Abdul-Rahman Sidiq Kareem, Iraqi Kurdish politician who served as Minister of Environment in the Interim Iraq Governing Council.
- Lamiya Abed Khadawi, Iraqi politician and parliamentarian. She served on the Iraqi parliament between January 2004 and her assassination on 27 April 2005.
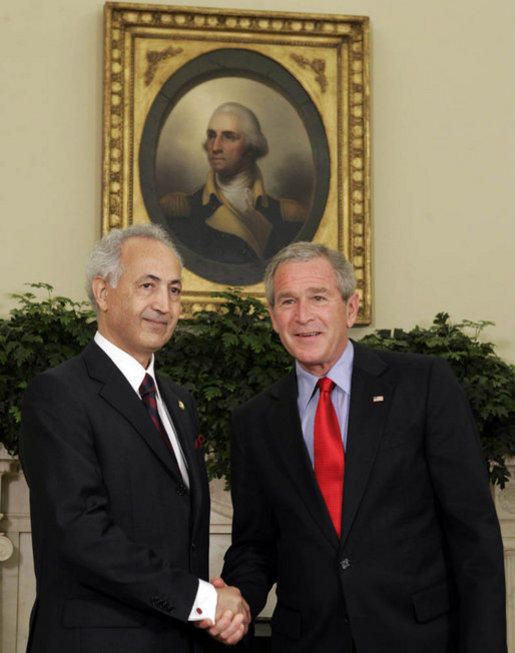
  Samir Shakir Mahmoud with George W. Bush
- Mohammed Jassem Khudair, Iraqi politician who served as Minister of Immigration in the Interim Iraq Governing Council.
- Wael Abdul Latif, Iraqi politician who served as Minister of Provincial Affairs in the Iraqi Interim Government .
- Samir Shakir Mahmoud, Iraqi politician and diplomat who served as member of the Interim Iraq Governing Council (2003–2004), Iraq's representative at the United Nations (2004–2006) and Iraqi ambassador to the United States (2006–2011)
- Abdul-Wahab Mirjan, Iraqi politician who served as Prime Minister of Iraq from December 1957 to March 1958.
- Hamid Majid Mousa, Iraqi politician and diplomat who served as member of the Interim Iraq Governing Council and as Secretary General of the Iraqi Communist Party between 1993 and 2016.
- Rashad Mandan Omar, Iraqi Turkmen politician who served as Minister of Science and Technology in the Interim Iraq Governing Council and the Iraqi Interim Government, from 2003 to 2005.
- Mahmoud Othman, Iraqi politician who served as member of the Interim Iraq Governing Council and was the founder of the Kurdish Socialist Party.
- Adnan Pachachi, Iraqi politician and diplomat who served as minister of foreign affairs (1965–1967). and Iraq's representative at the United Nations (1959–1965 and 1967–1969).
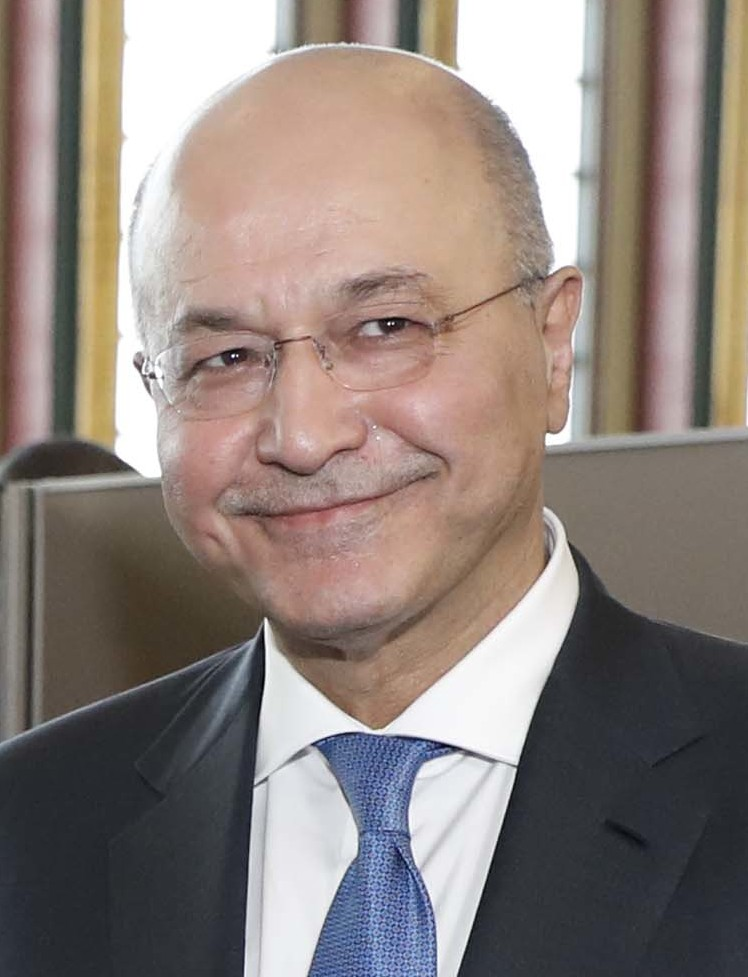
  Barham Salih
- Behnam Zayya Polis, Iraqi Assyrian politician who served as Minister of transport in the Interim Iraq Governing Council.
- Mohammed Tawfik Raheem
- Abdul-Ameer Abboud Rahima, Iraqi politician who served as Minister of Agriculture in the Interim Iraq Governing Council.
- Taha Yassin Ramadan, an Iraqi politician and military officer who served vice president of Iraq from 1991 to 2003. After the 2003 Invasion of Iraq, he was captured, then tried and executed in 2007.
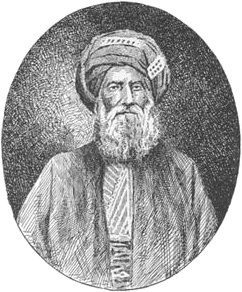
- David Sassoon
  Abdul-Latif Rashid, Iraqi politician who served as Minister of Water Resources between 2003 and 2010, and is currently serving as president of Iraq since 2022.
- Naji Sabri, Iraqi politician who served as the Iraqi Foreign Minister between 2001 and 2003.
- Barham Salih, Iraqi Kurdish politician who served as president of Iraq between 2018 and 2022 and Prime Minister of Kurdistan Region between 2009 and 2012.
- Ezzedine Salim, Iraqi politician and author who served as the President of the Iraqi Governing Council in 2004. He was assassinated shortly after leaving office.
- David Sassoon, Iraqi politician who served as the treasurer of Baghdad in Ottoman era Iraq from1817 to1829.
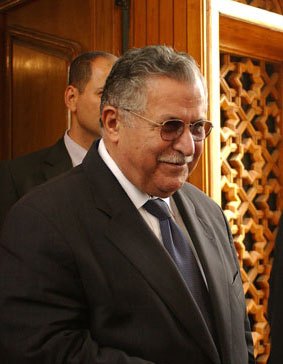
  Jalal Talabani
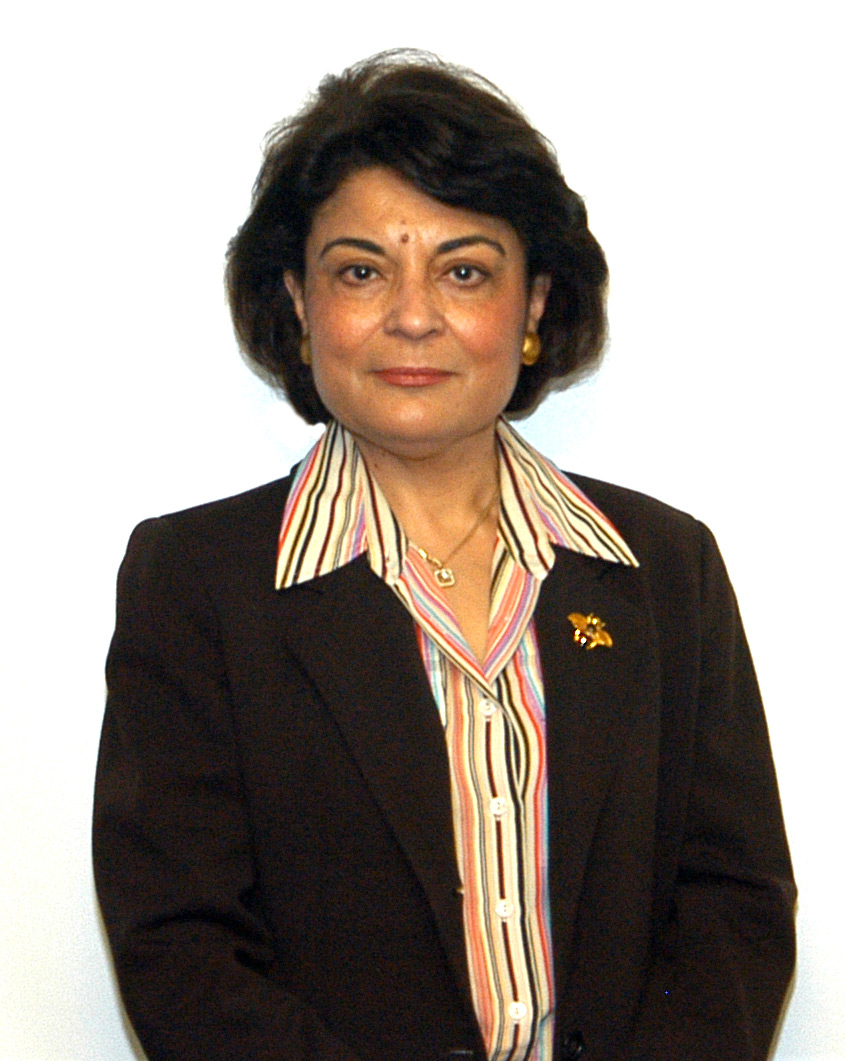
  Rend al-Rahim Francke
- Talib Shabib, Iraqi politician, diplomat and a prominent early member of the Arab Socialist Ba'ath Party.
- Naji Shawkat, Iraqi politician who served as the prime minister of Iraq between 1932 and 1933 under King Faisal I.
- Bayan Baqir Solagh, Iraqi politician who served in several notable government positions including : Minister of Transport (2014–2016), Minister of Finance (2006–2010), Minister of Interior (2005–2006). He also held a command position in the militant group the Badr Brigades.
- Hikmat Sulayman, Iraqi politician who served as the prime minister of Iraq between October 1936 and August 1937 under King Ghazi I.
- Jalal Talabani, Iraqi Kurdish politician who served as president of Iraq between 2005 and 2014. He was also the founder and leader of the Patriotic Union of Kurdistan.
- Abdul-Basit Turki, Iraqi politician who served as Minister of Human Rights in the Interim Iraq Governing Council.
- Haitham Rashid Wihaib
- Hoshyar Zebari, Iraqi Kurdish politician who served in several political positions including Deputy Prime Minister ( September 2014 – October 2014), Minister of Finance ( 2014–2016) and Minister of Foreign Affairs (2003–2014).
- Mohammed Amza Zubeidi, Iraqi politician and military officer who served as the Prime Minister of Iraq between 1991 and 1993.
- Jalal Dabagh, Iraqi Kurdish politician and journalist who lead the Kurdistan region's communist party. He is best known for translating The Communist Manifesto into Kurdish in 1967.
- Aiham Alsammarae, Iraqi politician who served as Minister of Electricity from August 2003 until May 2005.
- Rend al-Rahim Francke (born 1949), Iraqi political activist. She held the position as Iraqi ambassador to the United States. She is considered to be a secularist trying to enable Iraq to transition to a liberal democratic model.
- Hanan al-Fatlawi, Iraqi politician and parliamentarian . She is the founder and leader of the Eradaa Movement.
- Ibrahim Hesqel Salim Asheer (1940), Iraqi chemist and representated Iraq on international trade missions
- Naji Salman Salih (1920–2015), Jewish representative in the government of Saddam Hussein.

=== Politicians of Iraqi descent ===
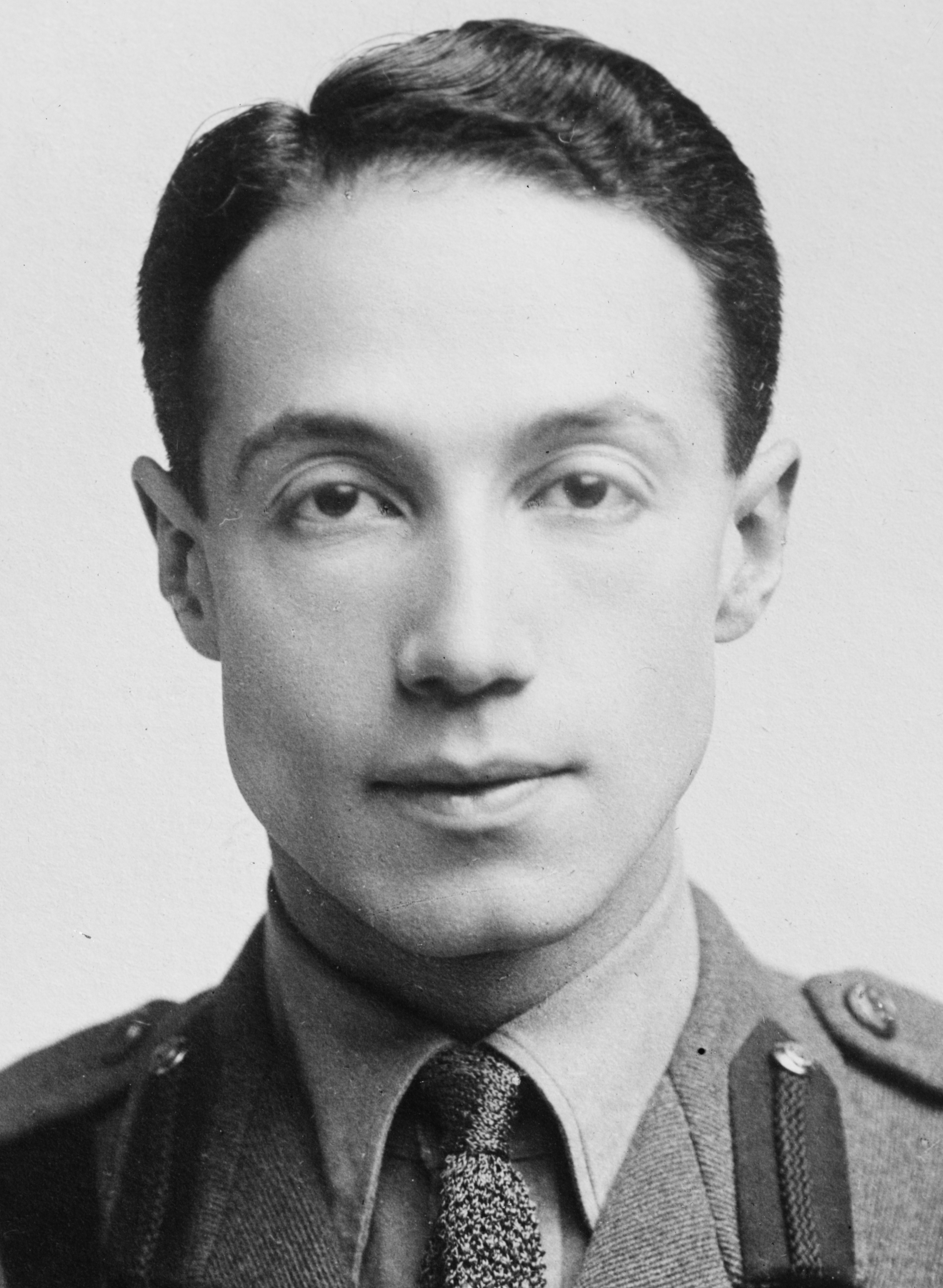
Sir Philip Sassoon, 3rd Baronet

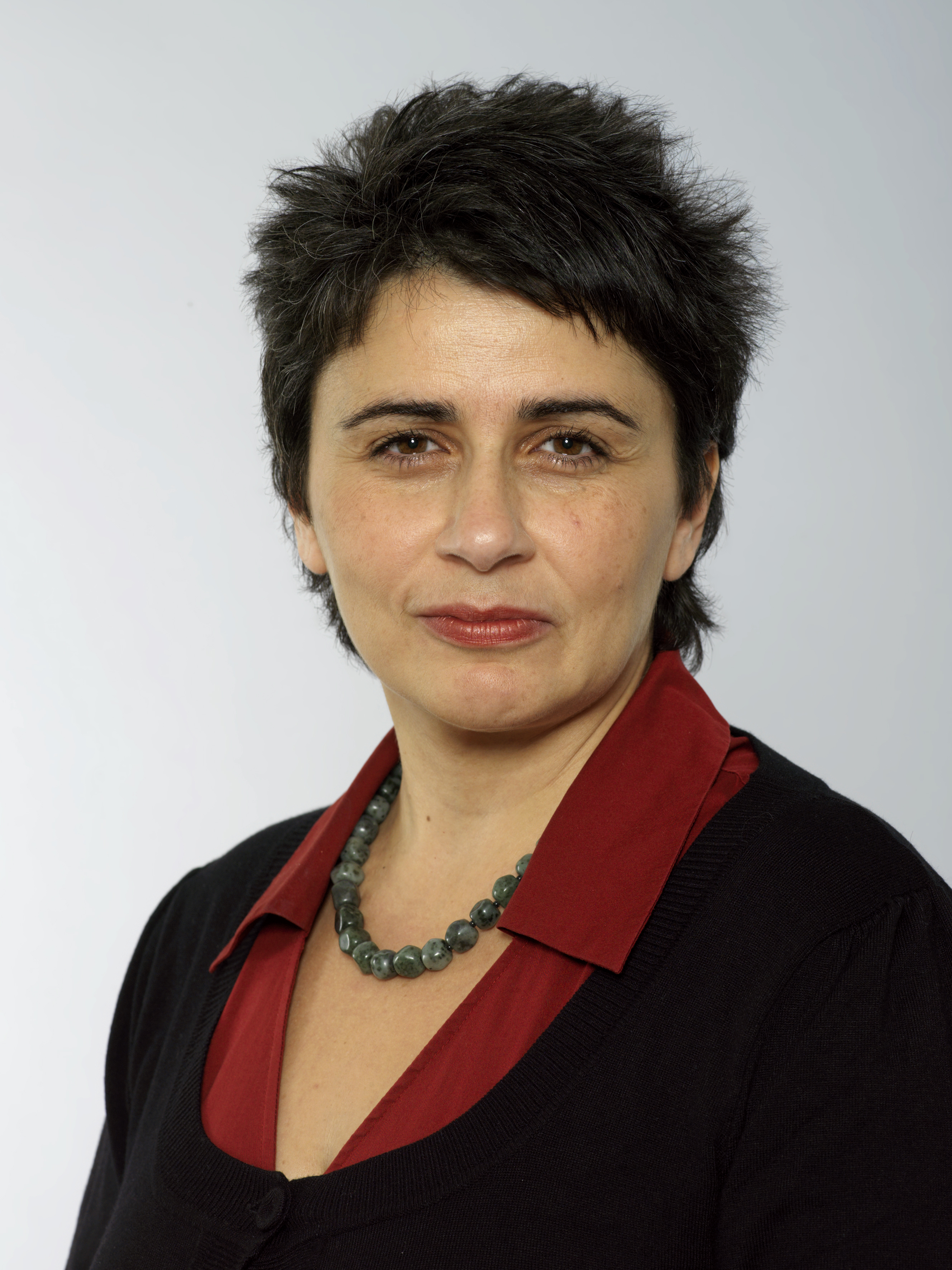
Esabelle Dingizian

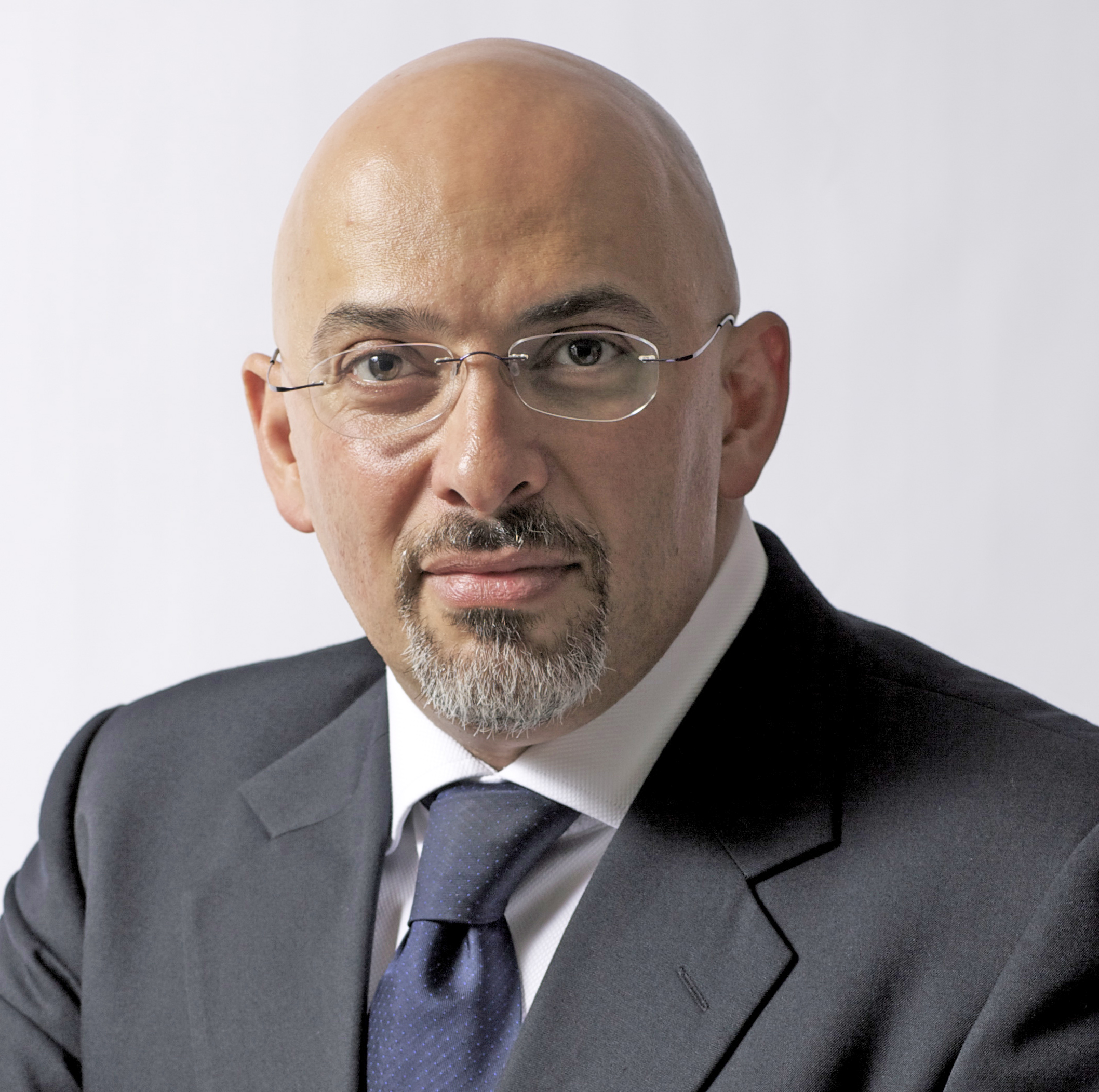
Nadhim Zahawi

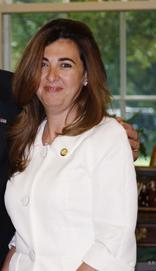
Houda Nonoo

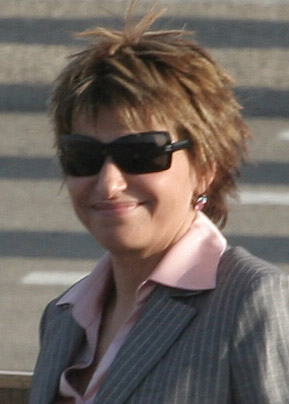
Dalia Itzik

- Faris Al-Rawi (born 2 May 1971), Trinidadian politician and a member of the People's National Movement, also Member of Parliament (MP) for San Fernando West and Attorney General of Trinidad and Tobago since 2015. Born in San Fernando to a Trinidadian mother and Iraqi father.
- Sir Philip Sassoon, 3rd Baronet (4 December 1888 – 3 June 1939), British politician, art collector and social host. Sassoon was a member of the prominent Jewish Sassoon family and Rothschild family. His father was Sir Edward Albert Sassoon, 2nd Baronet. His sister was Sybil Sassoon, who married the Marquess of Cholmondeley. He was a cousin of the war poet Siegfried Sassoon.
- Maurice Saatchi, Baron Saatchi (born 21 June 1946), Iraqi-British politician and founder of the advertising agencies Saatchi and Saatchi and M&C Saatchi.
- Andrew Rohan, MP (born 1948 in Iraq), Australian politician, is a member of the New South Wales Legislative Assembly representing Smithfield for the Liberal Party of Australia since 2011
- Nadhim Zahawi, British Conservative Party politician who has been the Member of Parliament (MP) for Stratford-on-Avon since 2010.
- Aryeh Bibi (born 28 April 1943 in Baghdad, Iraq), Israeli politician who served as a member of the Knesset for Kadima between 2009 and 2013.
- Anood Al-Samerai, British Southwark councillor for the Liberal Democrats. (Born to an Iraqi father and British mother).
- Binyamin Ben-Eliezer, Israeli politician and former soldier, the first Iraqi Jew to lead the Israeli Labor Party.
- José Murat Casab, born to Iraqi immigrants, Mexican politician and a member of the Institutional Revolutionary Party also former Governor of Oaxaca.
- Ra'anan Cohen, former Israeli politician who served as a government minister during the early 2000s.
- Ran Cohen, Israeli politician and Knesset member for Meretz-Yachad. (Born in Baghdad to Iraqi parents)
- Saad Hariri, Lebanese Legislator (2005–), son of Rafik Hariri and an Iraqi mother.
- Dalia Itzik, Israeli politician affiliated with the Kadima party. She took office as the first female speaker of the Knesset on 4 May 2006.
- David Saul Marshall, the leader of the Singapore Labour Front and became the first Chief Minister of Singapore in 1955, born into an Orthodox Jewish family of Iraqi ancestry in Singapore.
- Eliyahu Navi, mayor of Beersheba, Israel, born in Basra.
- Ebrahim Daoud Nonoo, former member of the National Assembly of Bahrain and currently the CEO of the Basma.
- Houda Nonoo, politician and current Bahraini Ambassador to the United States, of Iraqi Jewish origin.
- Anna Eshoo, U.S. Representative for California's 14th congressional district, serving since 1993, a member of the Democratic Party, the only member of Congress of Assyrian descent.
- Esabelle Dingizian (born in Baghdad in 1962), Swedish Green Party politician, member of the Riksdag since 2006.
- Murad Artin (born 6 January 1960 in Iraq), Swedish politician and Left Party member who worked in the Riksdag from 1998 to 2002
- Les Gara, Democratic member of the Alaska House of Representatives, representing the 23rd District since 2003.
- Franso Hariri (1937–February 18, 2001), Assyrian politician, high ranking and long-standing Kurdistan Democratic Party of Iraq member and head of the KDP block of Iraqi Kurdistan National Assembly.
- Fawzi Hariri (1958 Arbil, Iraq), Iraq's Minister of Industry and Minerals, sworn in on May 20, 2006.
- David Marshall (Singaporean politician) (12 March 1908 – 12 December 1995), politician and lawyer from Singapore who served as Singapore's first Chief Minister from 1955 to 1956. Born into an Orthodox Jewish family descended from Indian Baghdadi Jews in Singapore.

== Sports personalities ==
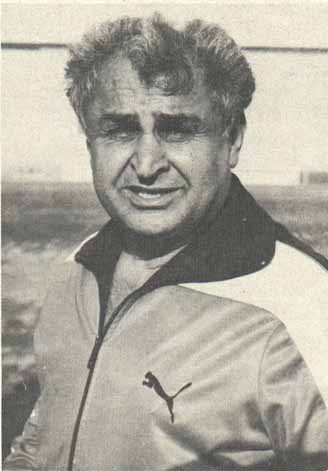
Ammo Baba, born Emmanuel Baba Dawud at a 1979 Military Cup game.

- Amir Albazi, professional mixed martial artist, first Iraqi-born fighter to compete in the UFC
- Ameen Al-Dakhil, professional footballer, first Iraqi-born footballer to play and score in the Premier League
- Ali Al-Hamadi, professional footballer, first footballer in the Iraqi national football team roster to play in the Premier League
- Ali Jasim, professional footballer, first Iraqi home-grown talent to sign a permanent transfer contract to play in one of the Big Five football leagues; namely, the Italian Serie A club Como
- Bassim Abbas, footballer
- Gezi Cohen (born 1938), Israeli Olympic weightlifter
- Fareed Lafta (Arabic:, فريد لفتة), Iraqi pilot and athlete, the first qualified cosmonaut from Iraq, and has appeared in Guinness World Records for participating in the first skydive above Mount Everest.
- Ali Adnan Kadhim, Iraqi footballer who plays as a left back for the Vancouver Whitecaps of Major League Soccer (MLS). Adnan was the 2013 Asian Young Footballer of the Year and often referred to as "Asia's Gareth Bale.”
- Haidar Abdul-Razzaq, footballer
- Yaser Kasim, Yaser was born 10 May 1991 in Baghdad. He is an Iraqi footballer who plays as Midfielder for Swindon Town F.C. in English League One.
- Ahmed Yasin Ghani, Iraqi footballer who plays as a midfielder for Örebro SK.
- Haidar Aboodi, footballer
- Nashat Akram (born 12 September 1984 in Al Hillah, Babylon, Iraq), Iraqi professional footballer who plays for Dalian Aerbin in the Chinese Super League.
- Najah Ali, Iraqi boxer who qualified for the 2004 Olympics in Athens
- Adnan Al-Kaissie, professional wrestler
- Abdul Wahid Aziz, Iraqi weightlifter, who won a bronze medal in the lightweight division at the 1960 Summer Olympics.
- Ammo Baba, former Iraqi international football player and coach of the Iraq national football team.
- Youra Eshaya, footballer
- Faisal Faisal, footballer
- Basil Gorgis, footballer
- Jassim Muhammad Haji, footballer
- Humam Tariq, footballer
- Falah Hassan, footballer
- Louay Salah Hassan, footballer
- Khaldoun Ibrahim, footballer
- Salih Jaber, footballer
- Abbas Obeid Jassim, footballer
- Mahdi Karim, footballer
- Younis Mahmoud, Iraqi football striker and captain of the Iraq national football team. In 2007 he captained the Iraq football team to the Asian Cup glory. He currently plays for Al-Gharafa Sports Club in Qatar.
- Justin Meram, Iraqi national soccer team player
- Ahmad Mnajed, Iraqi national soccer team player, who plays for Al-Ansar in Lebanon.
- Emad Mohammed, footballer
- Karrar Jassim Mohammed, footballer
- Hawar Mulla Mohammed, Iraqi footballer, known to be one of the best players in Iraqi national team, currently plays for Anorthosis FC in Cyprus.
- Sarhang Muhsin, footballer
- Samal Saeed Mujbel, footballer
- Qusay Munir, former Iraqi national football team player. Now manages Al-Diwaniya FC.
- Mohammad Nasser, Iraqi national football team player. Plays for Esteghlal Ahvaz in Iran.
- Yassir Raad, footballer
- Ahmed Radhi (born on April 21, 1964, in Baghdad, Iraq, but originally from Basra), former Iraqi football player and a current politician.
- Ali Rehema, footballer
- Noor Sabri, footballer
- Salih Sadir, footballer
- Hussein Saeed, footballer
- Edison David, born in Iraq, Iraqi Assyrian football player who played for Iraq and Al-Quwa Al-Jawiya in the 1950s and 1960s
- Kadhem Sharif, Iraqi world-class wrestler and weightlifter
- Hana Shezifi (born 1943), Israeli Olympic runner
- Abdul-Razzaq Ahmed Taha, Iraqi chess player and former president of Iraqi Chess Federation.
- Thamer Yousif, footballer
- Saadi Toma (born 25 April 1955 in Baghdad), Iraqi Assyrian former football player and coach.
- Peter Murad, former football player of Al-Minaa, Manchester United and Iraq national team.
- Humam Tariq, Iraq national team footballer

=== Sports personalities of Iraqi descent ===
- Hayder Hassan (born 1982 in Fort Lauderdale, Florida, United States), professional mixed martial artist, first competitor in the UFC of Iraqi descent.
- Justin Meram (born 1988), American/Iraqi soccer player currently playing for the Columbus Crew in Major League Soccer.
- Frans Dhia Putros (born July 14, 1993, in Aarhus, Denmark), Danish/Iraqi professional football player who primarily plays as a right back for FC Fredericia.
- Moshe Agami, former Israeli professional soccer player best known for his time with Maccabi Haifa F.C.
- Andreas Haddad (born Andreas Daniel Gabriel Turander on 5 May 1982), Assyrian Swedish football striker from Sweden who currently plays for Swedish side Hammarby. He has yet to earn a call up to the Swedish national football team and can thus play for Turkey or Iraq should he choose one of them.
- Riyadh Al-Azzawi, Iraqi-British kickboxer and the 2008 World Kickboxing Network World Champion.
- Rabeh Al-Hussaini, Iraqi-Filipino basketball player for Ateneo Blue Eagles.
- Faris Al-Sultan, German professional triathlete and winner of the 2005 Ironman Triathlon. Born in Munich to a German mother and Iraqi father.
- Avram Grant, former football manager of Chelsea F.C. His mother is an Iraqi Jew.
- Shwan Jalal, Iraqi-English football goalkeeper.
- Bovar Karim, Iraqi-Swedish footballer who currently plays for Tromsø IL in Norwegian Premier League.
- Karo Murat, World Rated Boxer of Armenian Iraqi Origin
- Christer Youssef (born 1987), Swedish footballer of Assyrian descent who plays for Assyriska FF as a midfielder
- Joseph Judah (born December 13, 1984), American Canadian fighting in the junior middleweight division.
- Daniel Judah (born in Brooklyn, New York), American southpaw professional cruiserweight and light heavyweight boxer.
- Zab Judah (born October 27, 1977), American professional boxer.
- Zidane Iqbal, professional footballer, first Iraqi to play in the Premier League and Manchester United, as well as the first to play in the UEFA Champions League
- Josiah Judah (born August 21, 1978), professional boxer. His ring nickname is "Gorilla."
- Yoel Judah (born 1956?), eldest member of the Brooklyn-based Judah boxing family.

== Television and radio personalities ==
- Rosil Al Azawi (born January 11, 1987, in Sharjah, UAE), Iraqi television presenter and model based in the United Arab Emirates.
- Jasim Al-Azzawi, Iraqi host, who presents the show Inside Iraq on Al Jazeera English
- Suhair al-Qaisi (born 1985 in Baghdad, Iraq), Iraqi news anchor for the Al Arabiya television station
- Laila Al Shaikhli, television presenter on Al Jazeera English
- Anwar Al-Hamadani, television presenter
- Rola Bahnam, Lebanese TV presenter of an Iraqi descent. She is mostly known for working in Future TV. She was a former member of the Lebanese girl band, The 4 Cats in 1998
- Shaima Zubeir, television presenter
- Sama Dizayee (born 2 June 1988), Iraqi radio and television presenter.
- Sami Yako (born Dec 25th 1948 in Kirkuk, Iraq), lives in London, singer, comedy actor, producer and writer, works at a TV station in United Arab Emirates.

=== Television and radio personalities of Iraqi descent ===
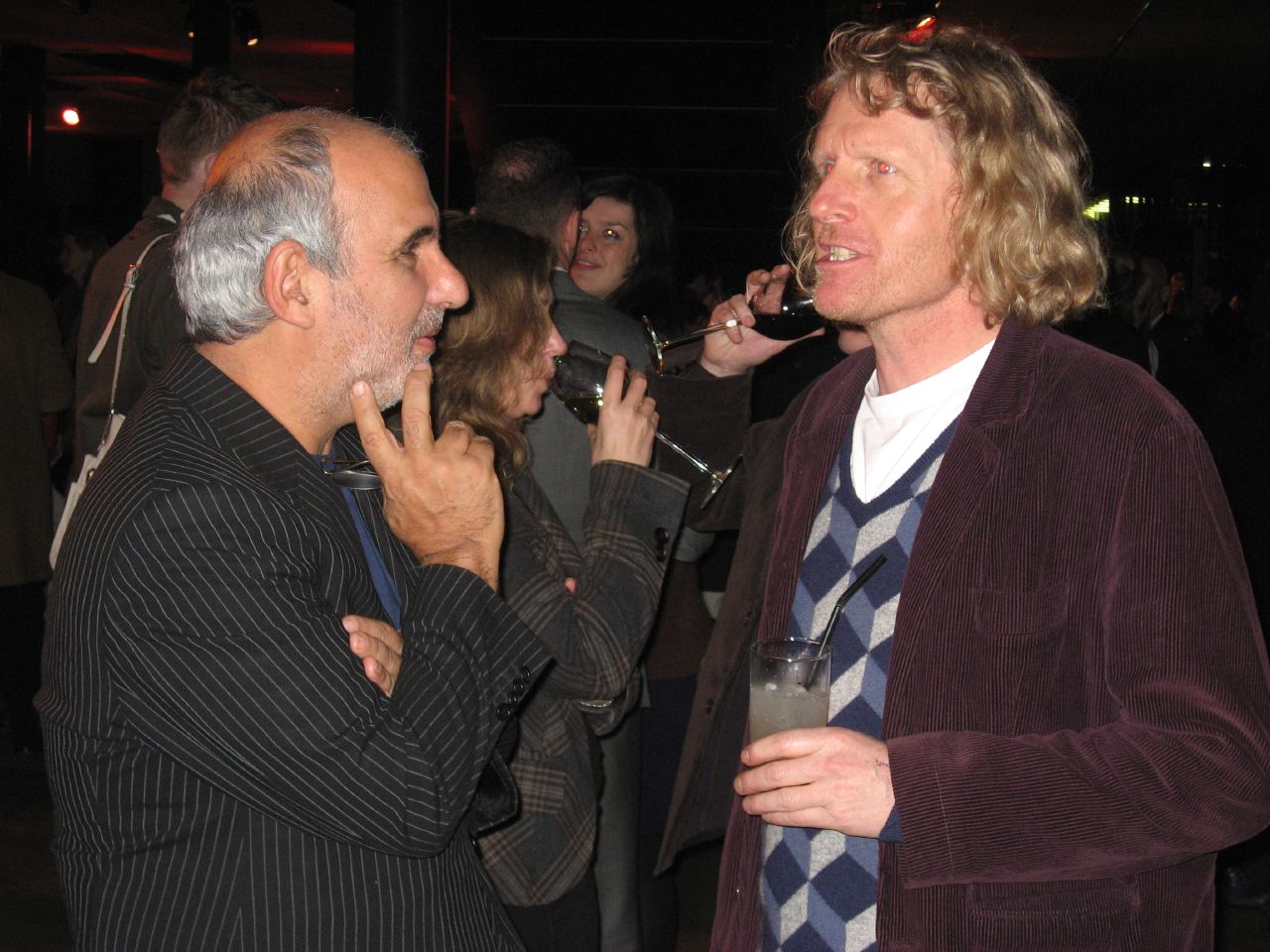
Alan Yentob

- Alan Yentob (born 11 March 1947), British television executive and presenter. He has spent his entire career at the BBC. Alan Yentob was born into an Iraqi Jewish family in London.
- Kenza Braiga, French TV reality show star of Iraqi origin.
- Péri Cochin, television host (French of Lebanese/Iraqi ancestry)
- Eli Yatzpan, Israeli television host and comedian

== Writers and poets ==
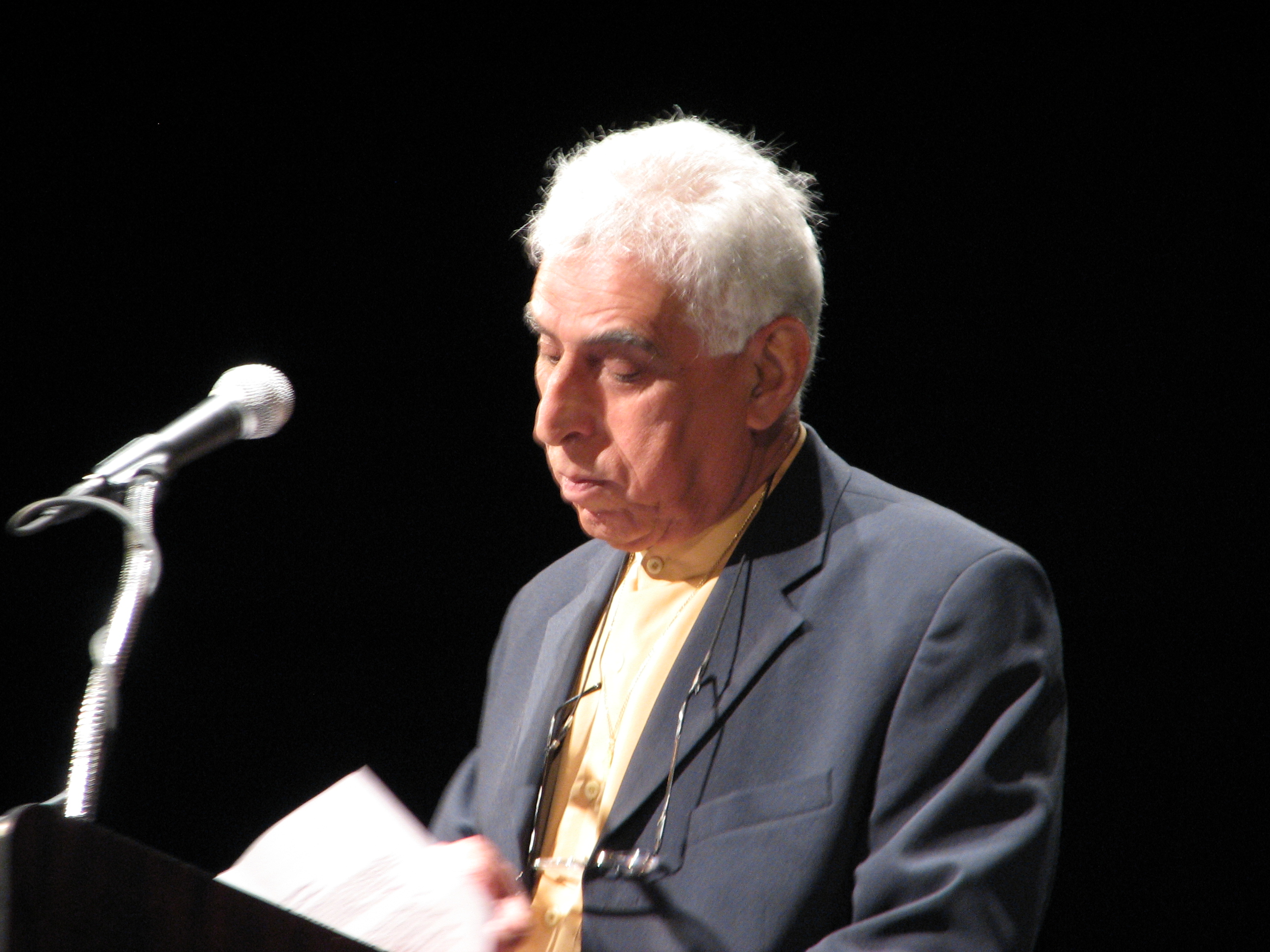
Saadi Youssef

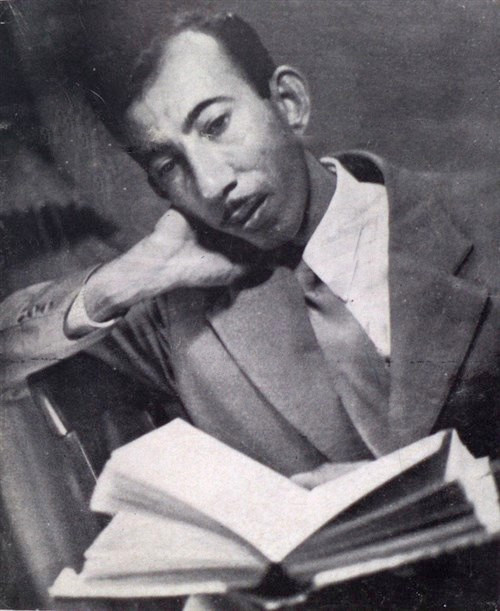
Badr Shakir al-Sayyab

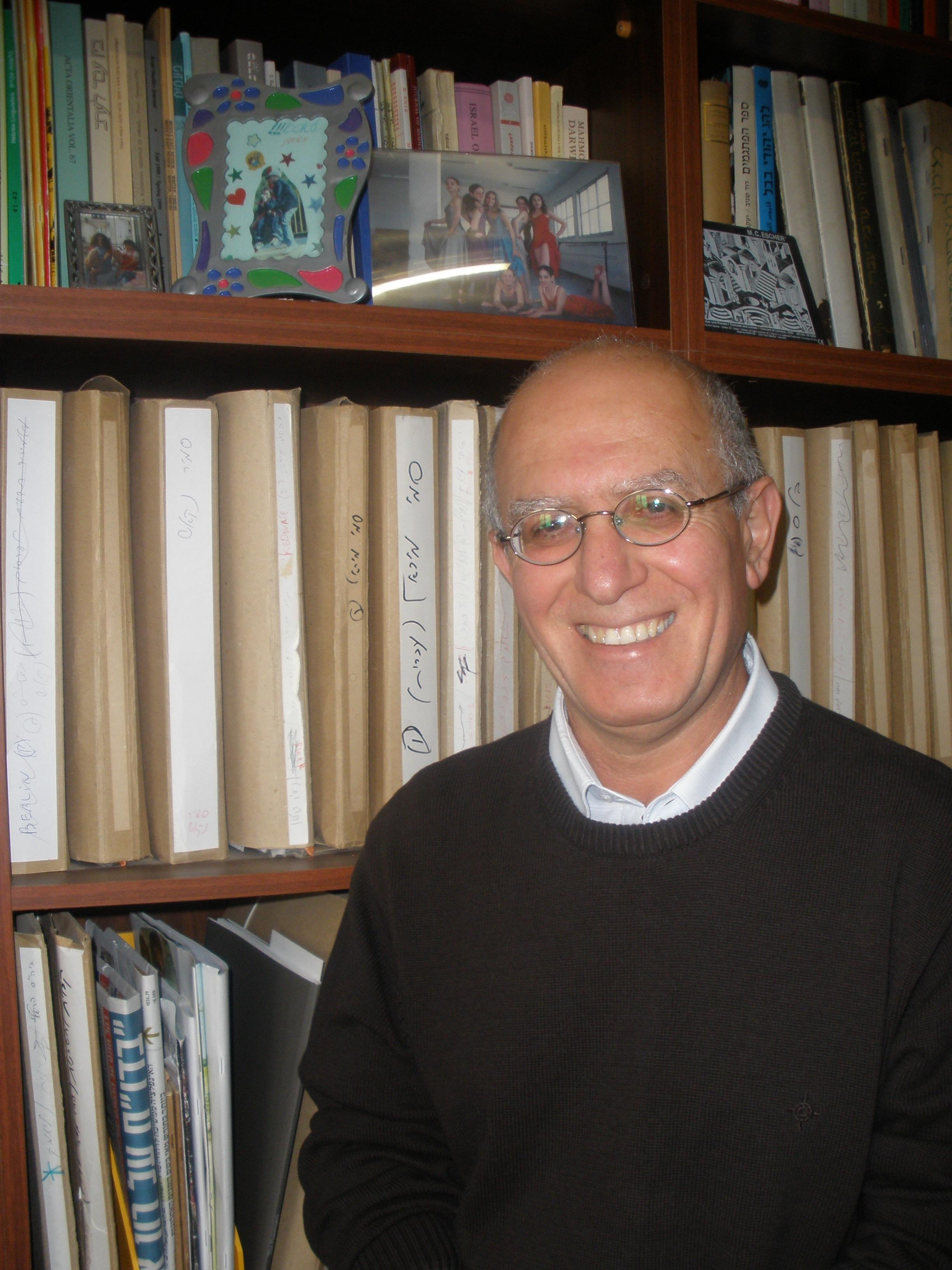
Reuven Snir

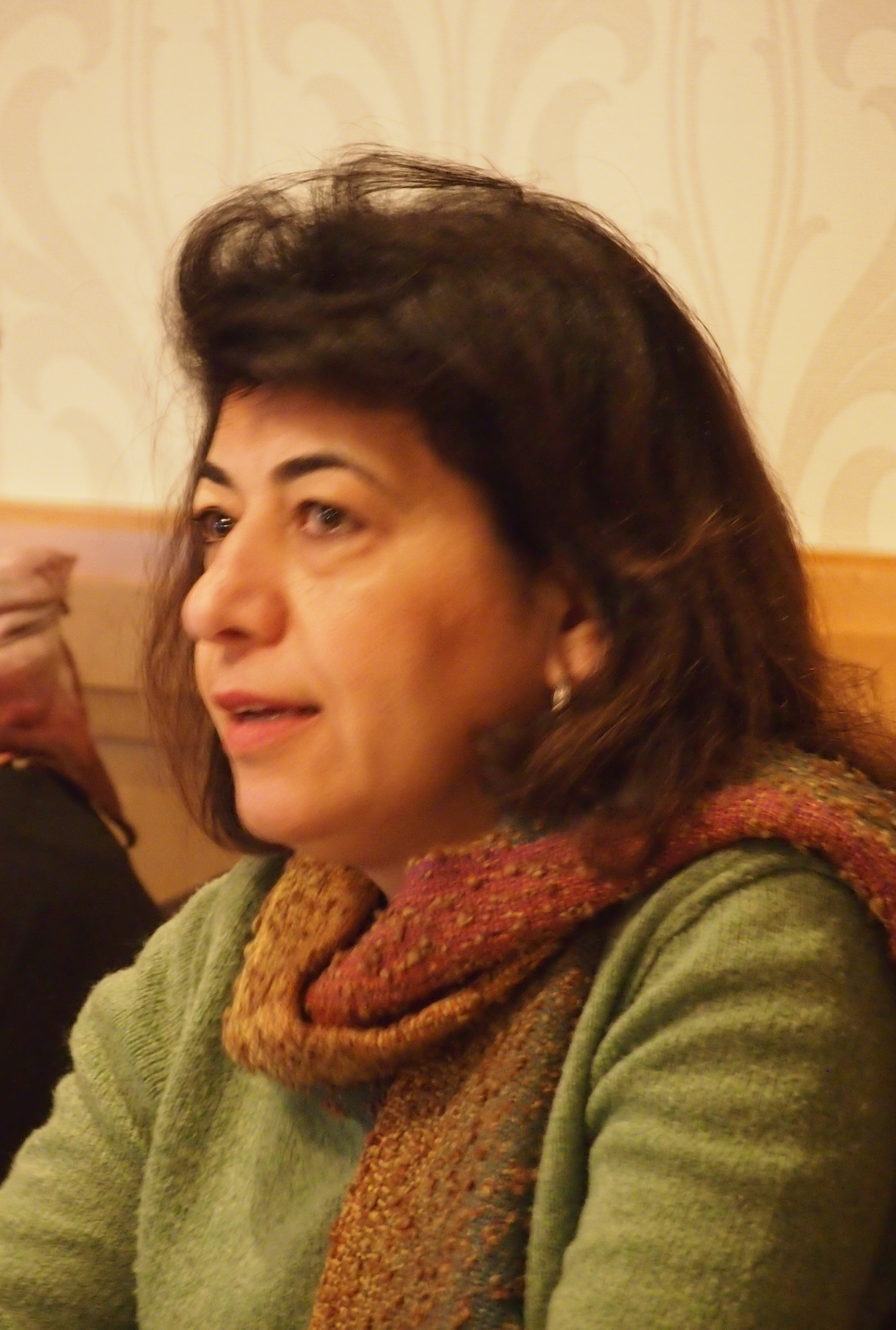
Dunya Mikhail

- Bahira Abdulatif, writer, translator and professor.
- Qusay Abd al-Ra'uf Askar, commonly known as Qusay al-Shaykh Askar (Arabic: قصي الشيخ عسكر) (born 1951)
- Nazik Al-Malaika (August 23, 1923, Baghdad, Iraq – 20 June 2007), Iraqi female poet and is considered by many to be one of the most influential contemporary Iraqi female poets.
- Abd al-Wahhab Al-Bayati (December 19, 1926 – August 3, 1999), Iraqi poet. He was a pioneer in his field and defied conventional form of poetry that had been common for centuries.
- Abdul Razzak Abdul Wahid (1930–2015), Mandaean poet.
- Saadi Yousef (born 1934 near Basra, Iraq), Iraqi author, poet, journalist, publisher, and political activist.
- Abd al-Wahhab Al-Bayati (December 19, 1926 – August 3, 1999), Iraqi poet. He was a pioneer in his field and defied conventional form of poetry that had been common for centuries.
- Ferhad Shakely (born 1951), prominent Kurdish writer, poet and researcher. He is one of the founders of modern Kurdish poetry in the post-Goran period. He was born in 1951 in the province of Kirkuk in Iraq.
- Muhammad Mahdi al-Jawahiri (26 July 1899 – 1 January 1997), famous Iraqi poet.
- Badr Shakir al-Sayyab (December 24, 1926–1964), Iraqi and Arab poet, born in Jekor, a town south of Basra in Iraq. was one of the greatest poets in Arabic literature, whose experiments helped to change the course of modern Arabic poetry.
- Lamia Abbas Amara (1929–2021), Mandaean poet and pioneer of modern Arabic poetry.
- Rabia Basri, Rābiʻa al-ʻAdawiyya al-Qaysiyya (Arabic: رابعة العدوية القيسية) or simply Rābiʿah al-Baṣrī (Arabic: رابعة البصري) (717–801 C.E.) was a female Muslim saint and Sufi mystic.
- Enheduanna, Akkadian princess as well as High Priestess of the Moon god Nanna (Sin). Enheduanna composed 42 hymns addressed to temples across Sumer and Akkad including Eridu, Sippar and Esnunna
- Amira Hess, Israeli poet and artist. She arrived to Israel in 1951 from Baghdad Iraq.
- Haifa Zangana (born 1950 in Baghdad, Iraq), Iraqi novelist, author, artist, and political activist, best known for writing Women on a Journey: Between Baghdad and London.
- Daisy Al-Amir, Iraqi writer, poet and novelist. She is author of The Waiting List: An Iraqi Woman's Tales of Alienation has renowned her as one of the leading female writers of Iraq. She was born in Basra in 1935.
- Sargon Boulus (1944–2007), Iraqi-Assyrian poet and short story writer
- Walid al-Kubaisi, writer
- Thura Al Windawi, author
- Jamil Sidqi al-Zahawi, poet and philosopher
- Inaam Kachachi (born 1942), Iraqi journalist and author
- Al-Hariri of Basra, Iraqi poet, scholar of the Arabic language and high government official of the Seljuk Empire.
- Hafsa Bikri, poet
- Ya'qub Bilbul, writer
- Naeim Giladi, Anti-Zionist, author of an autobiographical article and historical analysis titled The Jews of Iraq. The article later formed the basis for his originally self-published book Ben-Gurion's Scandals: How the Haganah and the Mossad Eliminated Jews.
- Jamal Jumá, poet and researcher
- Betool Khedairi, author
- Farida Khalaf, ISIS escapee and author
- Moshe Levy, author
- Alia Mamdouh, author
- Sami Michael, author
- Dunya Mikhail, poet
- Samir Naqqash, novelist, short-story writer, and playwright
- Abu Nuwas (750–810), born in Ahvaz, of Arab and Persian descent, one of the greatest of classical Arabic and Persian poets.
- David Rabeeya (born 1938), author and professor of Hebrew and Judaic Studies.
- Mahmoud Saeed, novelist
- Samuel Shimon, Iraqi author and journalist, was born into an Assyrian Iraqi family in Habbaniya in 1956. He is a co-founder of Banipal magazine. His autobiographical novel (An Iraqi in Paris), was published in Arabic in 2005, and a limited first edition in English translation was published the same year.
- Rena Kirdar Sindi, author and party hostess (born in Baghdad).
- Reuven Snir, writer
- Haifa Zangana, novelist, author and artist
- Al-Mutanabbi (915–965) famous Abbasid-era poet who was born in Kufa, he came into fame through the court of Sayf al-Dawla. His poetry is widely known and still quoted today in many Arab countries.

=== Writers and poets of Iraqi descent ===
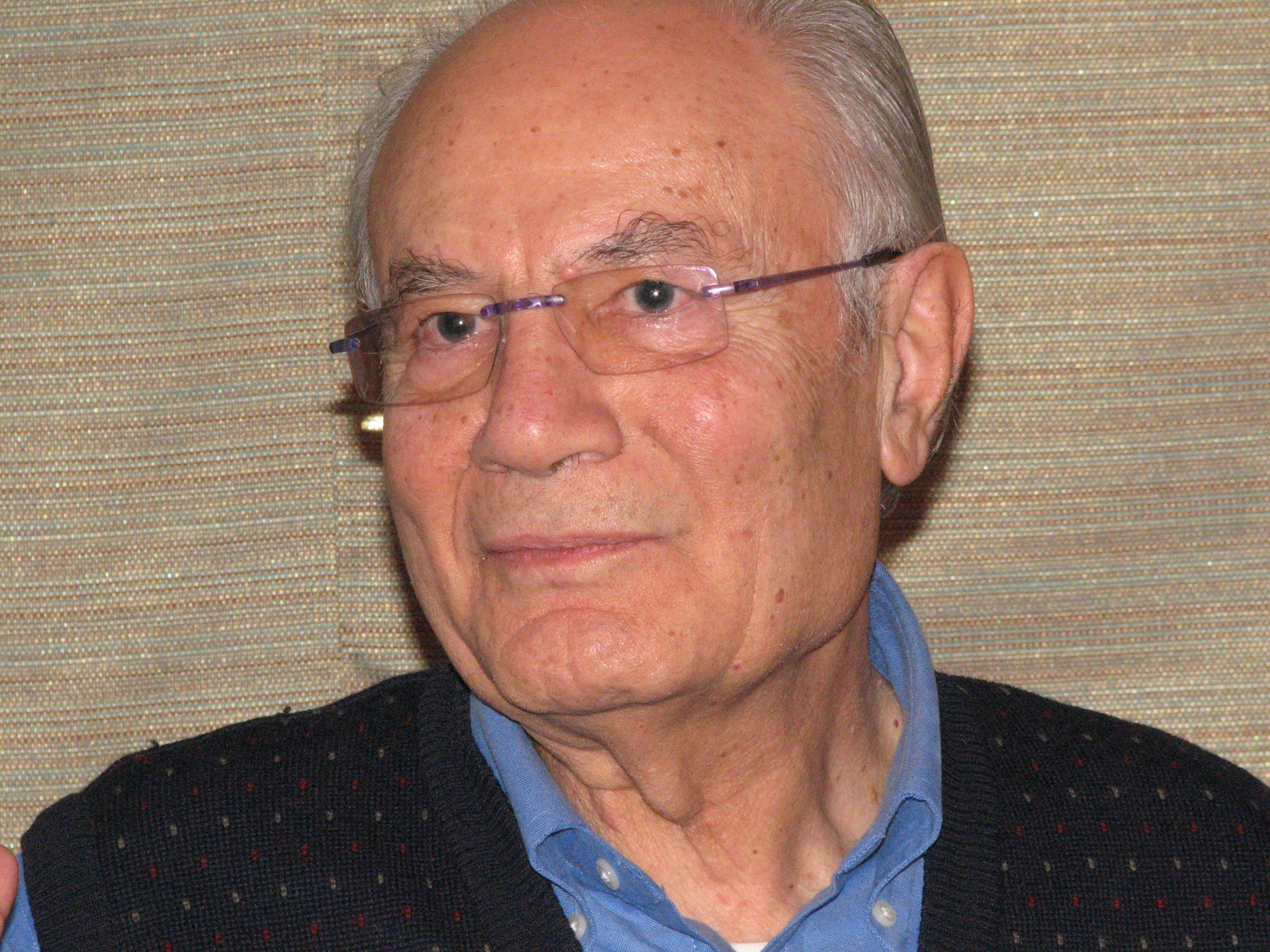
Eli Amir

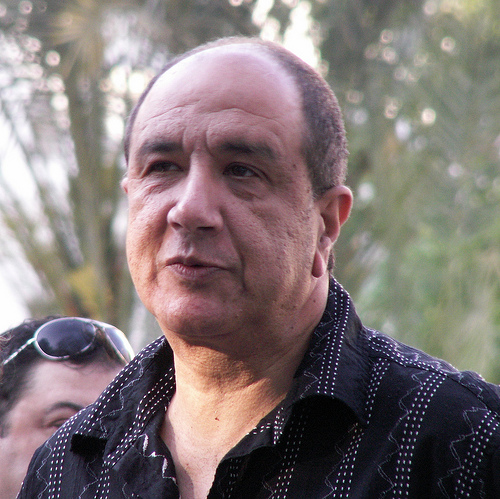
Ronny Someck

- 'Atika Wahbi al-Khazraji (1924–1997), poet.
- Abdul Rahman Munif (1933–2004), one of the most important Arabic novelists of the 20th century, born in Amman to an Iraqi mother and Saudi father.
- Abraham Yahuda (1877–1951), Jewish writer, teacher and linguist, born in Jerusalem to a Jewish family originally from Baghdad.
- Achmed Khammas, German writer of Iraqi and German heritage
- Alia Mamdouh (born 1944 in Baghdad, Iraq), Iraqi novelist, author and journalist living in exile in Paris, France. She won the 2004 Naguib Mahfouz Medal for Literature for her novel The Loved Ones.
- Alise Alousi, Iraqi-American poet
- Alon Ben-Meir, professor, writer, the Middle East Project director at the World Policy Institute
- Amira Hess, Israeli poet and artist
- Ari Ben-Menashe, Israeli author of Profits of War: Inside the Secret U.S.-Israeli Arms Network
- Armand Nassery, author and filmmaker.
- Eli Amir, Israeli writer and activist.
- Ella Habiba Shohat, Professor of Cultural Studies at New York University.
- Greg Patent, author, born in Hong Kong to a Russian father and Iraqi mother
- Jack Marshall (author), poet and author
- Khalid al-Maaly, German-Iraqi writer, poet and publisher
- Hassan Abdulrazzak, Iraqi-British playwright.
- Leilah Nadir, Iraqi-Canadian writer who grew up in England and Canada with an Iraqi father and an English mother.
- Loolwa Khazzoom, Iraqi American Jewish writer who writes about Jewish multiculturalism and the cultural traditions.
- Lorraine Ali, American reporter, editor, culture writer and music critic for Newsweek.
- Lutfiya al-Dulaimi (1939 – 2026) writer, activist.
- M.T. Mehdi (1928–1999), Iraqi-American writer and pro-Palestinian activist.
- Michelle Nouri, Italian journalist and author. She was born in Prague, Czech Republic, in 1973 to an Iraqi father and Czech mother.
- Naïm Kattan, Canadian novelist, essayist and critic.
- Rachel Shabi, author and contributing writer to The Guardian. Shabi was born to Iraqi Jewish parents.
- Rachel Wahba, writer
- Raed Jarrar, writer, architect and human rights activist
- Ronny Someck, Israeli poet
- Sami Michael, Israeli author and the president of The Association for Civil Rights in Israel.
- Shant Kenderian, notable as an Iraqi-born United States citizen who became an American prisoner-of-war after being forced to fight against the United States in the Persian Gulf War
- Siegfried Loraine Sassoon (8 September 1886 – 1 September 1967), eminent English poet, writer, and soldier. Decorated for bravery on the Western Front, he became one of the leading poets of the First World War. His father, Alfred Ezra Sassoon (1861–1895), son of Sassoon David Sassoon, was a member of the wealthy Baghdadi Jewish Sassoon merchant family.
- Sinan Antoon (born 1967) (Arabic: سنان أنطون), Iraqi poet, novelist, scholar, and an associate professor at the Gallatin School of Individualized Study, New York University. He was featured in the 2003 documentary film About Baghdad, which he also co-directed.
- Suzanne Alaywan, poet and painting artist, born in Beirut to a Lebanese father and Iraqi mother
- Zainab Salbi, writer, activist, co-founder and president of Women for Women International
- Zuhur Dixon (1933–2021), poet

=== Religious Leaders and Theological Scholars ===
- Hormisdas Estefan Jabri, (1872–1953) was Archbishop of the Chaldean Catholic Church from 1917 until his death in 1953. Making him the longest serving archbishop of the Chaldean church with 46 years of service.
- Ignatius Peter IV (1798–1894) 116th Patriarch of Syrian Orthodox Church of Antioch and Supreme Head of the Syriac Orthodox Church in the World
- Ignatius Antony I Samheri (1801–1864) Patriarch of the Syriac Catholic Church from 1853 to 1864
- Ignatius Aphrem I Barsoum (1887–1957) 120th Patriarch of Syrian Orthodox Church of Antioch and Supreme Head of the Syriac Orthodox Church in the World
- Ignatius Jacob III (1913–1980) 121st Patriarch of Syrian Orthodox Church of Antioch and Supreme Head of the Syriac Orthodox Church in the World
- Ignatius Zakka I (1931–1914) 122nd Patriarch of Syrian Orthodox Church of Antioch and Supreme Head of the Syriac Orthodox Church in the World
- Abo of Tiflis, Patron Saint of Tbilisi, Georgia
- Andraos Abouna (March 23, 1943 – July 27, 2010), Roman Catholic auxiliary bishop of Hirta and the auxiliary bishop of the Chaldean Catholic Patriarchate of Babylon.
- Shimon Agassi (1852–1914), Hakham and Kabbalist
- Mohammad Hussein Al-Ansari (born 1952), Australian Iraqi religious leader and scholar
- Asenath Barzani (1590–1670), renowned Kurdish Jewish woman who lived in Mosul, Iraq, daughter of the illustrious Rabbi Samuel Barzani, studied Kabbalah.
- Raphael I Bidawid, patriarch of the Chaldean Catholic Church, 1989–2003, Syriac scholar.
- Louis Cheikhô (1859–1927), ethnic Assyrian Orientalist and Theologian, considered as a major contributor and pioneer of the rediscovery of the Eastern Rite Christian heritage.
- Paul II Cheikho, patriarch of the Chaldean Catholic Church from 1958 to 1989, born on November 19, 1906, in Alqosh
- Emmanuel III Delly, Patriarch of Babylon of the Chaldeans and Primate of the Chaldean Catholic Church.
- Mar Dinkha IV, current Catholicos-Patriarch of the Assyrian Church of the East.
- Ganzibra Dakheel Edan (1881–1964), patriarch and international head of the Mandaeans from 1917, until his death in 1964
- Mordechai Eliyahu, former Sephardi Chief Rabbi of Israel
- Yosef Hayyim (1 September 1835 – 30 August 1909), leading hakham, authority on Jewish law (Halakha) and Master Kabbalist. He is best known as author of the work on Halakha Ben Ish Ḥai. Rav Yosef Chaim was born in Baghdad where his father, Hakham Eliyahu Chaim, was the active leader of the Jewish community.
- Rishama Sattar Jabbar Hilo, current patriarch and head of the Mandaeans in Iraq.
- Abraham Hillel, Chief Rabbi of Baghdad
- Jules Mikhael Al-Jamil, Archbishop Jules Mikhael Al-Jamil was born in Bakhdida on November 18, 1938 – dies in Rome, Italy on December 3, 2012). He was the Syriac Catholic titular archbishop of Tagritum and the auxiliary bishop.
- Yitzchak Kaduri, renowned Israeli Orthodox Haredi rabbi and kabbalist
- Anastase-Marie al-Karmali (lit. 'Anastasius-Maria the Carmelite'; 5 Aug 1866 – 7 Jan 1947), Iraqi Catholic priest and Discalced Carmelite friar, lexicologist and lexicographer of the Arabic language, philologist, periodical editor
- Mani, prophet and the founder of Manichaeism, a gnostic religion
- Yitzhak Nissim (1896–1981), former Sephardic Chief rabbi of Israel
- Mohammad Baqir al-Hakim (1939–2003), Islamic scholar and politician
- Fadhil al-Milani (born 1944), religious leader and scholar
- Ali al-Sistani (born 1930), Twelver Shia Grand Ayatollah and marja'. Described as the spiritual leader of Shia Muslims worldwide, and one of the most senior scholars in Shia Islam.
- Ali Hassani Baghdadi (born 1955), twelver Shi'a Marja
- Hussein Al-Sadr (born 1952), Grand Ayatollah and high-ranking Muslim religious scholar
- Abu Hanifa (699–767), Muslim scholar and theologian, best known for the Hanafi school of Sunni Islamic jurisprudence.
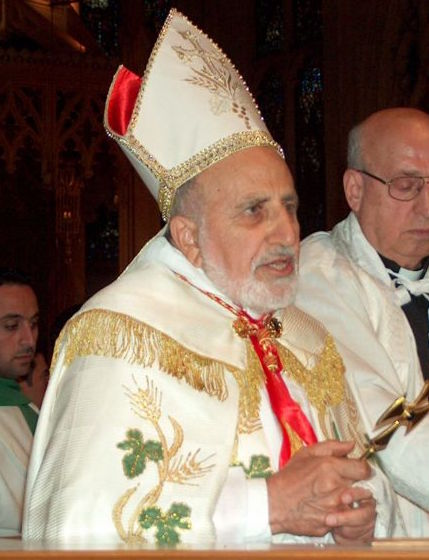
Emmanuel III Delly

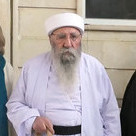
Khurto Hajji Ismail

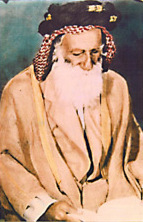
Dakhil Aidan

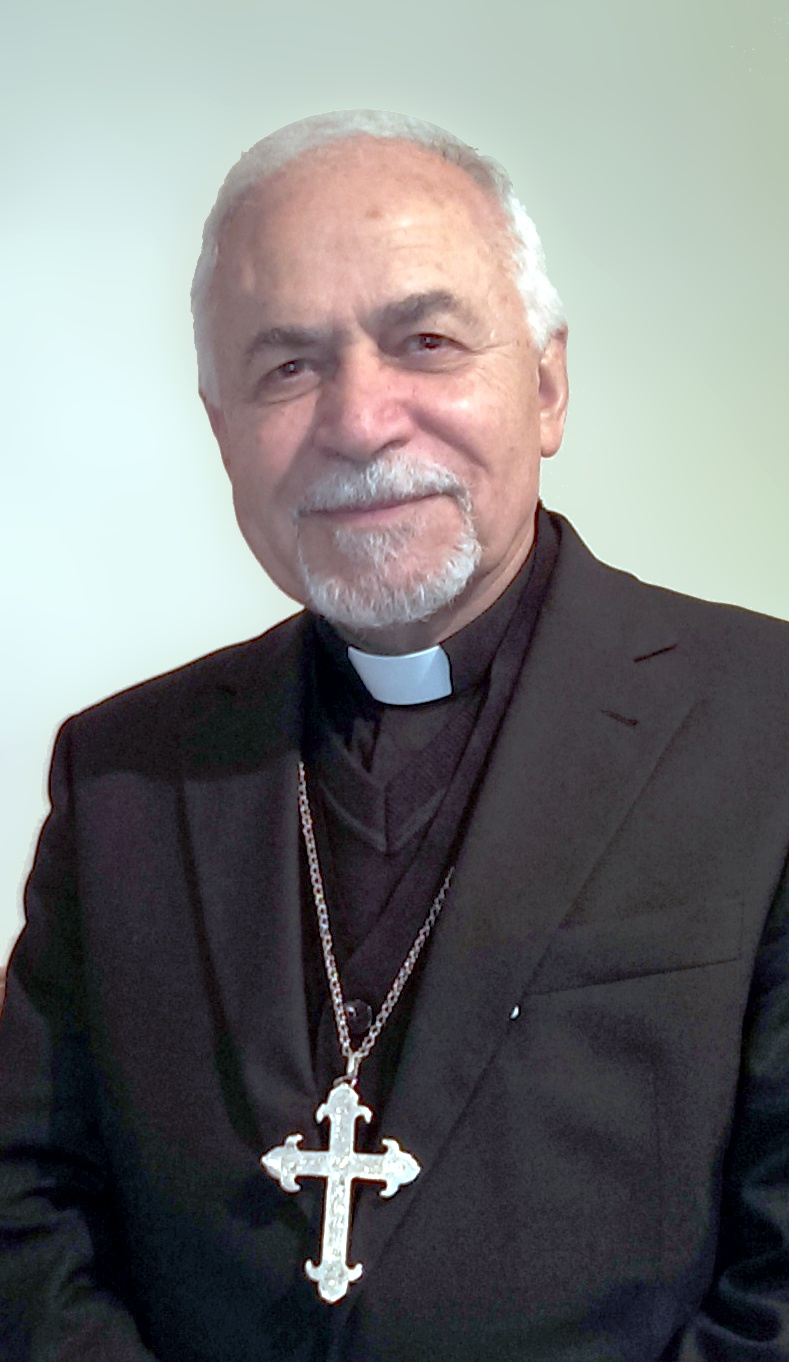
Basile Georges Casmoussa

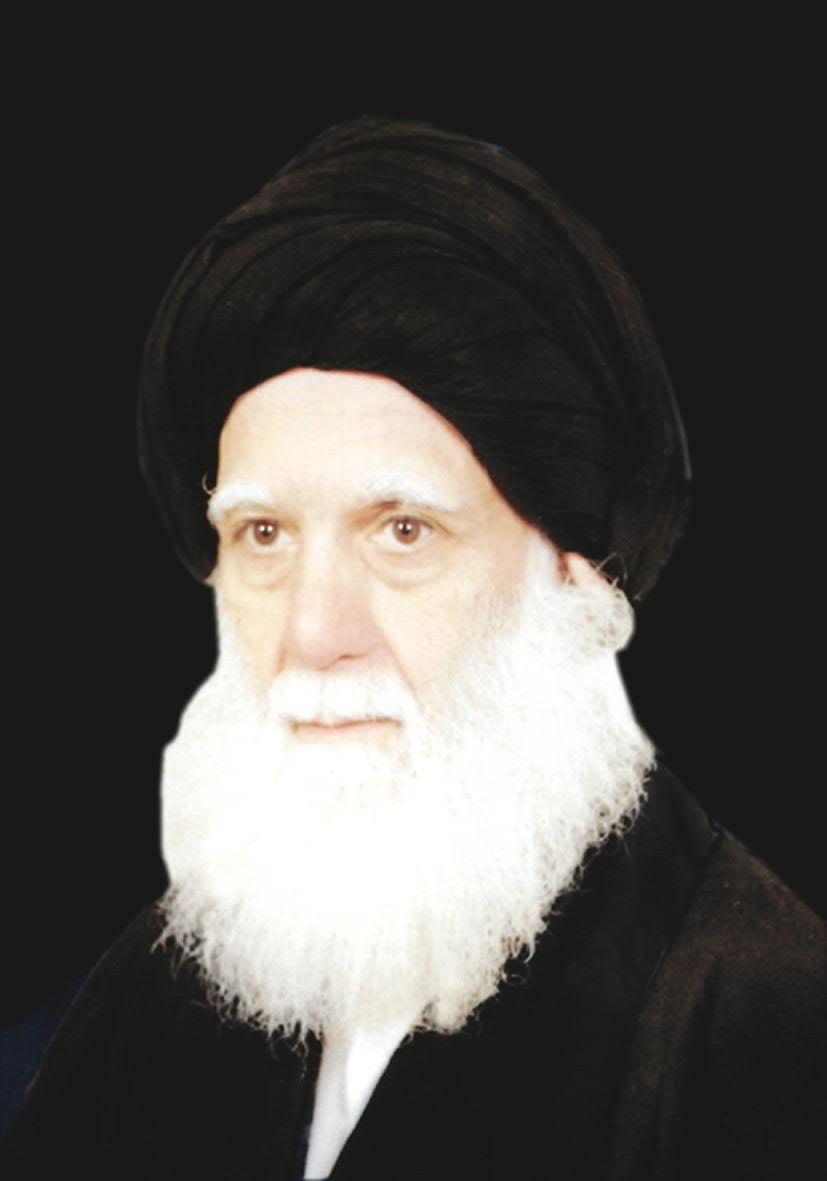
Mohammed al-Sadr

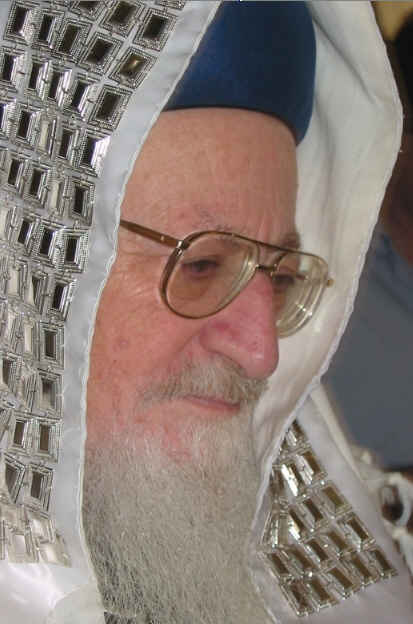
Mordechai Eliyahu

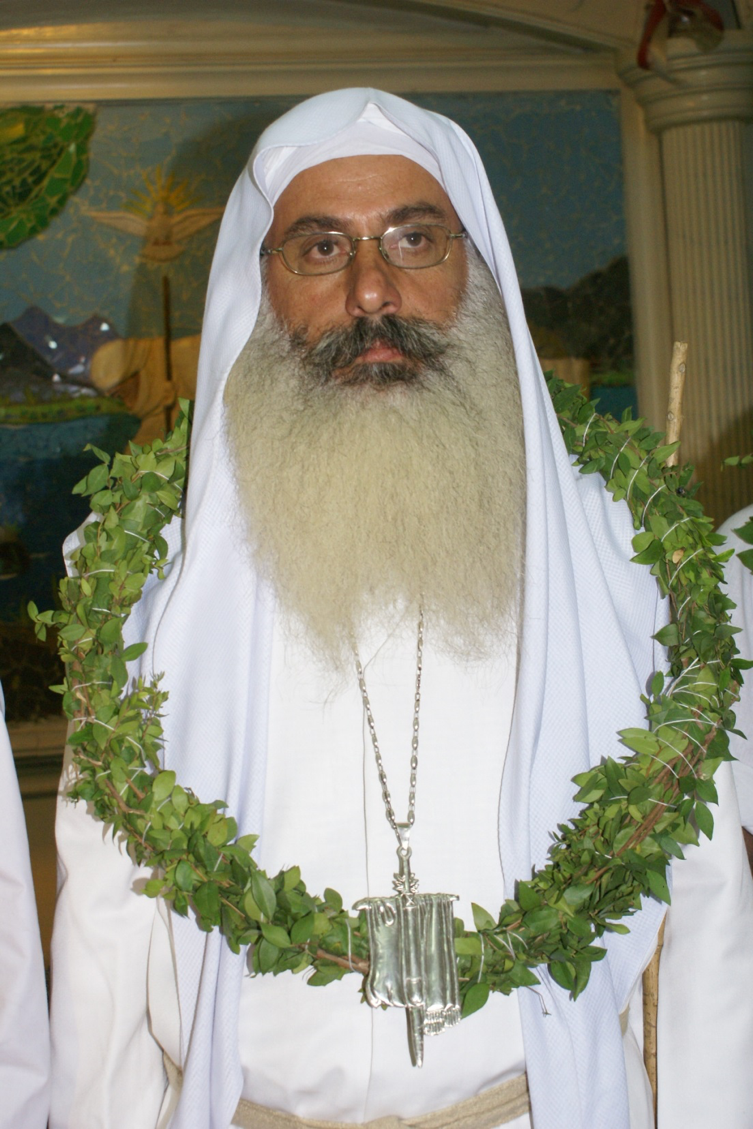
Sattar Jabbar Hilo

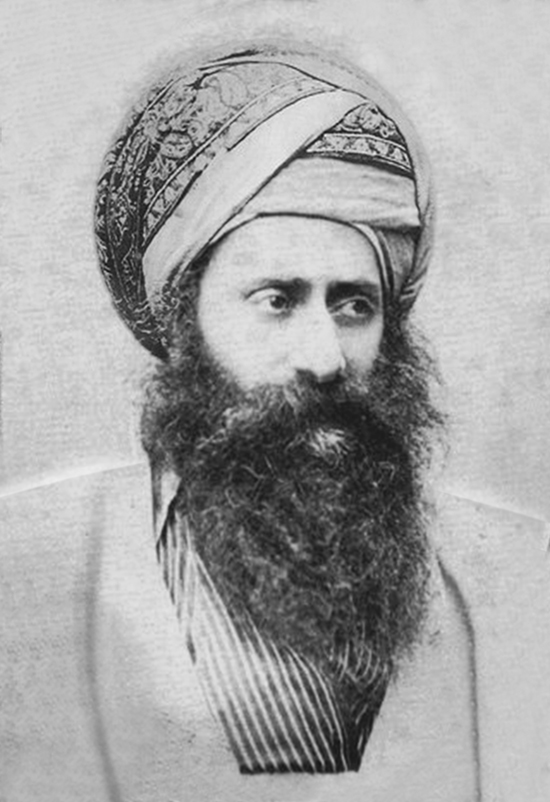
Yosef Hayyim

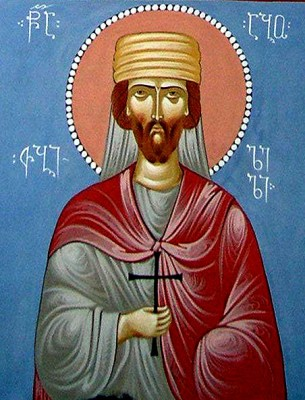
Saint Abo of Tiflis

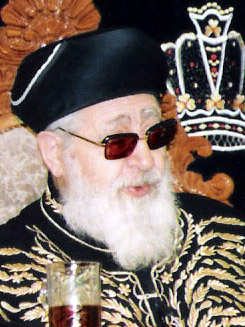
Ovadia Yosef

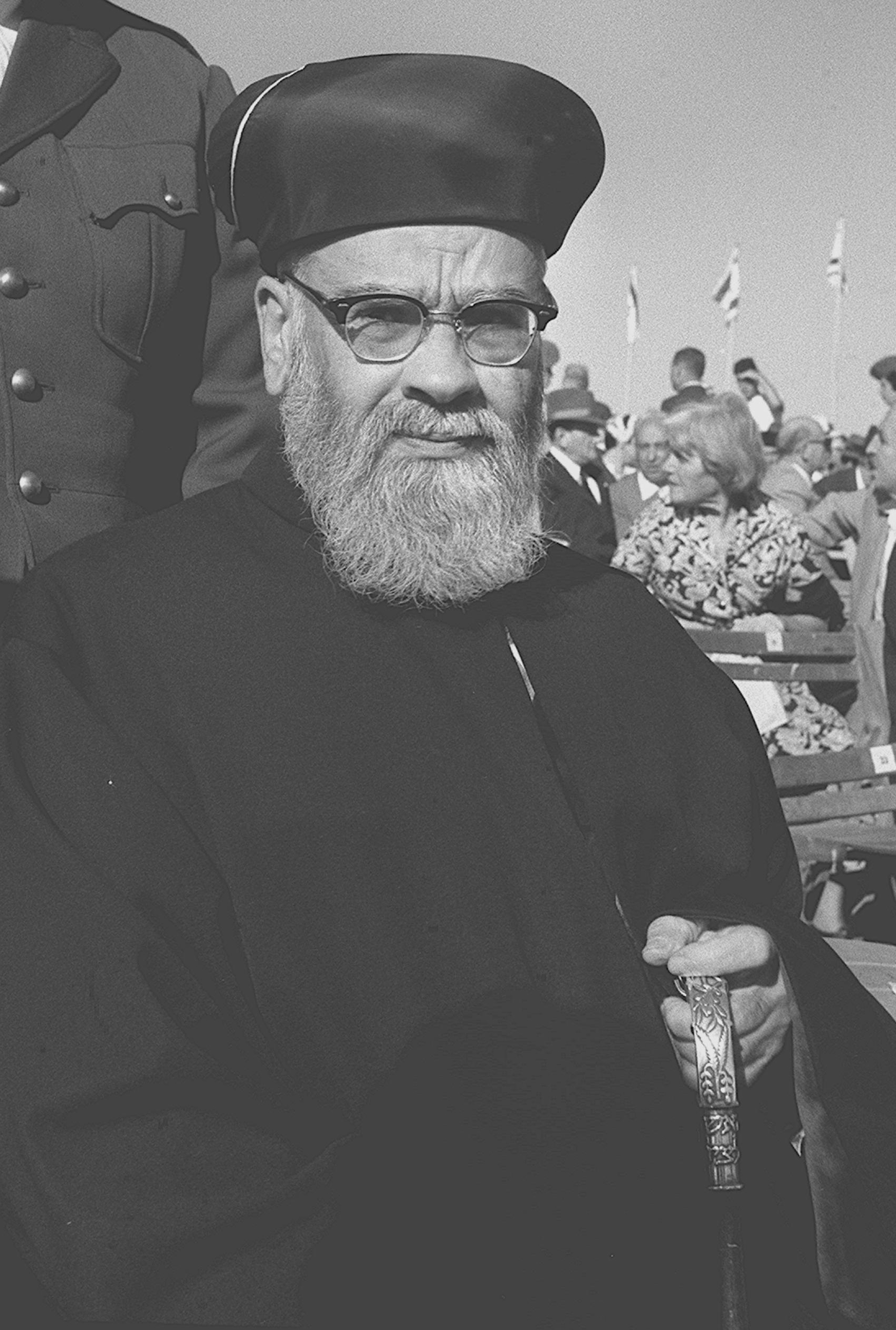
Yitzhak Nissim

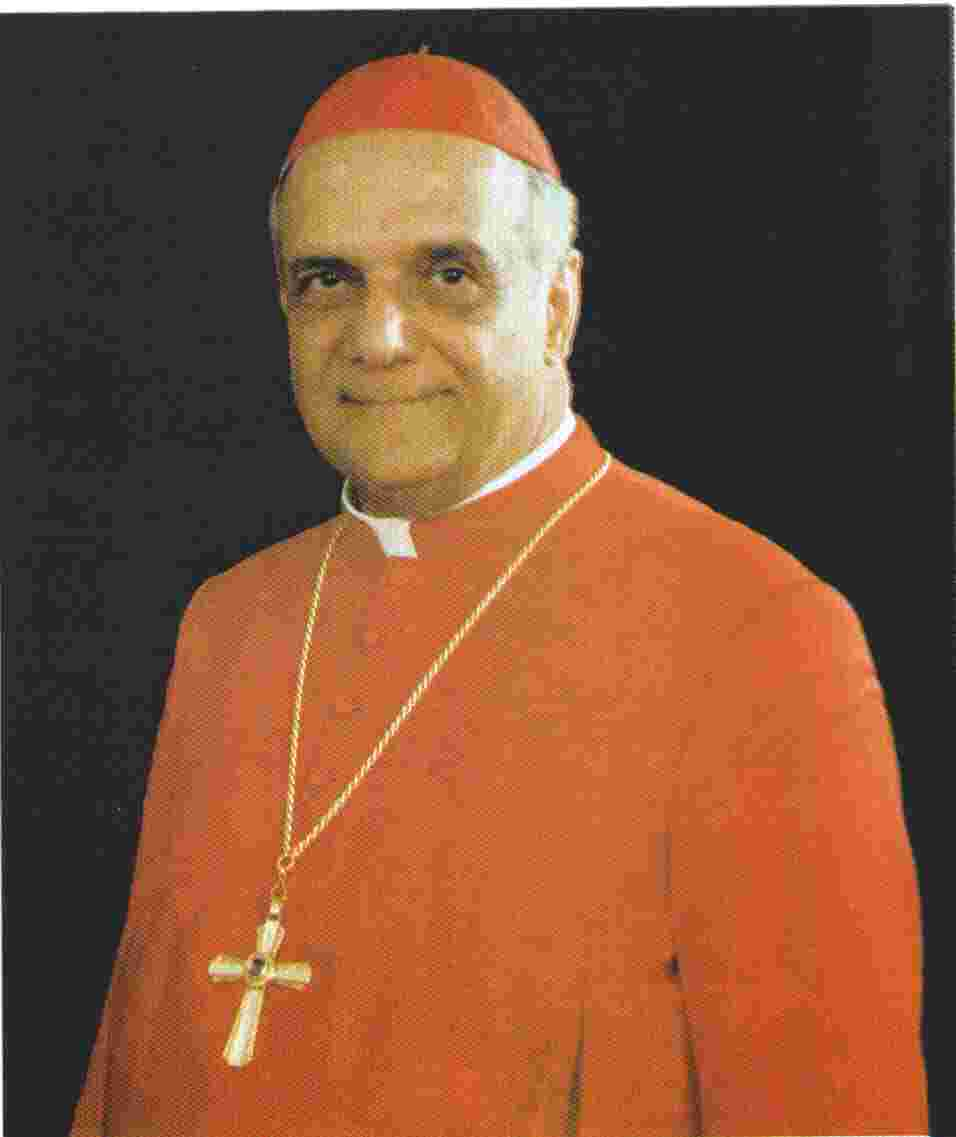
Raphael I Bidawid

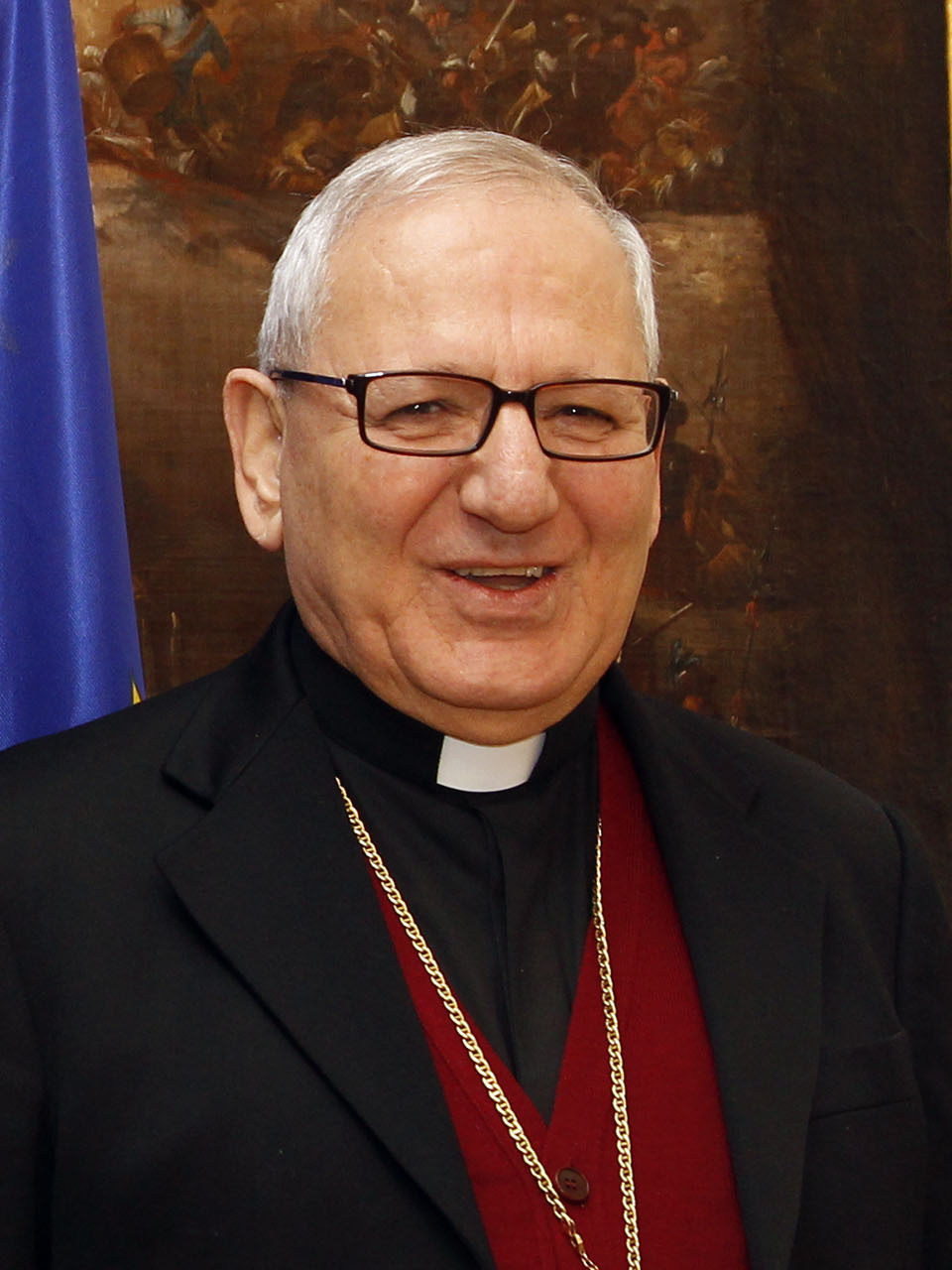
Louis Raphaël I Sako

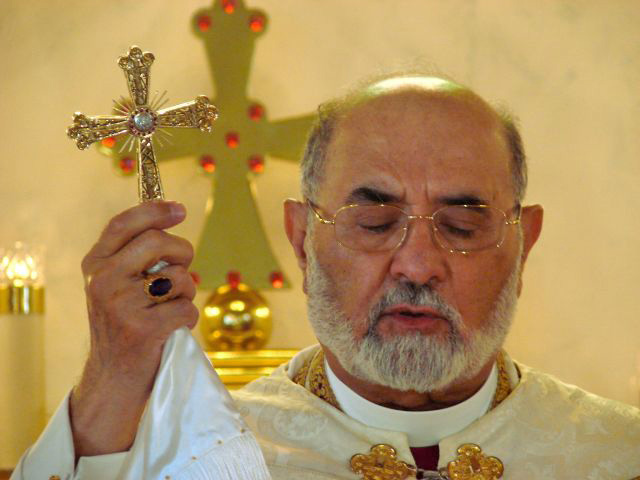
Mar Dinkha IV

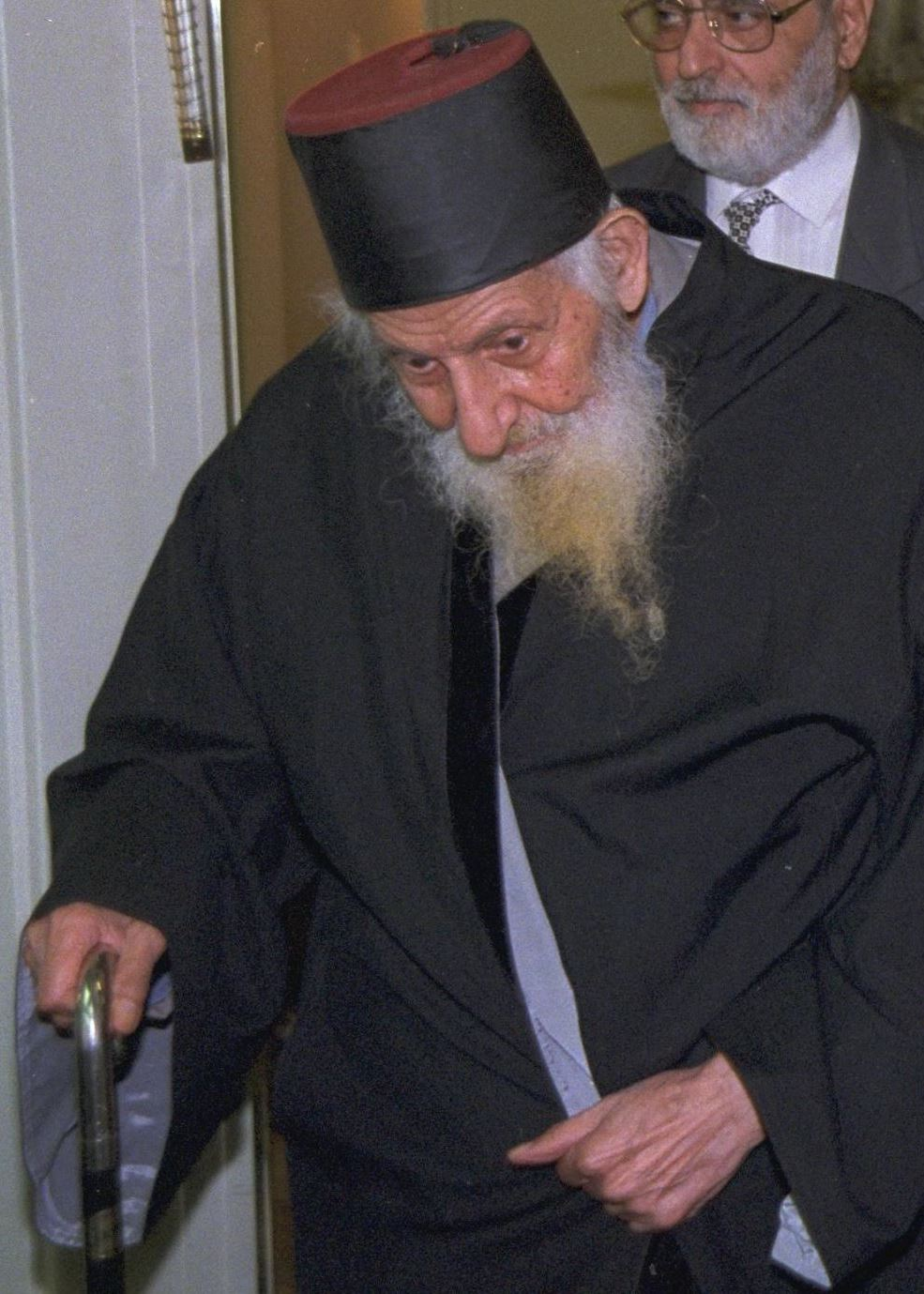
Yitzchak Kaduri

== See also ==
- List of Assyrians
- List of British Iraqis
- List of Iraqi Americans
