= List of Iraqi films =

An A-Z list of films produced in Iraq:

== By year ==
- Son of the East - Directed by - Ibrahim Helmy 1946
- Laila in Baghdad - Directed by - Ahmed Kamal Morsi 1947
- Cairo Baghdad Directed by Ahmed Badr Khan 1947
- Alia and Issam - Directed by - Andre Schouten French 1949
- The fifties
- Fitna and Hassan - Directed by - Haidar Al-Omar 1950
- Laila in Iraq - Directed by - Ahmed Kamel Morsi 1950
- Regret - Directed by - Abdul Khaliq Al-Samarrai 1955
- Rose - Directed by - Yehia Tawfik 1956
- Who is responsible - Directed by - Abdul Jabbar Tawfiq Wali 1954
- Tswahen - Directed by - Hussein Al-Samarrai 1957
- Life taught him manners - Directed by - Muhannad Al-Ansari 1958
- Saeed Effendi - Directed by - Kamran Hosni 1958
- Bride of the Euphrates - Directed by - Abdel Hadi Mubarak 1958
- Dr. Hassan - Directed by - Mohamed Mounir Al Yassin 1958
- The sixties
- The 7 O'Clock Train - Directed by - Hekmat Labib Awadis - 1961
- Anima - Starring - Dahel Hassan - 1962
- The Final Decision - Directed by Safaa Mohamed Ali - Produced by Ibrahim Al-Shaikhli and Starring Jumaa Al-Shabli and Salma Abdel Ahad 1962
- Marriage Project - Directed by Kamran Hosni 1962
- Nebuchadnezzar - Directed by - Kamel Al-Azzawi 1962
- Abu Hila - Directed by - Mohamed Shukry Gamil Youssef Girgis 1962
- Autumn Leaves - Directed by - Hekmat Labib Awadis 1963
- Basra at 11 - Directed by - William Simon 1963
- The Guard directed by Khalil Shawqi 1967
- Al-Jabi 1968 Story, screenplay and dialogue by Jaafar Ali Starring: Asaad Abdul Razzaq
- The seventies
- The Thirsty Directed by Mohamed Shukri Jamil 1972
- The Head movie directed by Faisal Al-Yasiri 1976
- The Marshes Directed by Qasim Hawal 1976
- The River movie directed by Faisal Al-Yasiri 1977
- (The Wall) Directed by (Hussein Al-Salman) 1973
- The Turn Directed by Jafar Ali 1975
- Houses in that Alley Directed by Qasim Hawal 1977
- The Walls, directed by Mohamed Shukri Jamil, 1979
- Another Day Directed by Saheb Haddad 1979
- 80s
- The Sniper directed by Faisal Al-Yasiri 1980
- Long Days Directed by Tawfiq Saleh 1980
- Al-Qadisiyah, directed by Salah Abu Seif, 1981
- Faeq Gets Married, directed by Ibrahim Abdel Jalil, 1984
- The Mission Continues Directed by Mohamed Shukri Jamil 1984
- Hours of Salvation Directed by Tariq Abdul Karim
- The Burning Borders Directed by Saheb Haddad 1985
- It Happened in One Day Directed by Hussein Al Salman 1985
- The executors are directed by Abdel Hadi Al Rawi.
- The Rumble of the Sea directed by Sabih Abdul Karim
- Our sun will never set, directed by Abdul Salam Al-Aazami
- The big issue
- some strength
- The Knight and the Mountain directed by Mohamed Shukry Gamil
- Iraqi Wedding Directed by Mohamed Shukry Jamil
- The Cradle Directed by Laith Abdul Amir 1985
- It Happened in One Day - Directed by Hussein Al Salman 1986
- Six by Six - Directed by Khairiya Al-Mansour - 1988
- Building 13
- 90s
- Strange Cornfields Directed by Qasim Abdul 1991
- 100 on 100 - Directed by - Khairiya Al Mansour 1992
- King Ghazi directed by Mohammed Shukri Jamil 1992
- Iraqi Women: A Voice from Exile Directed by Maysoun Al-Pachachi 1993
- Still Life Directed by Qutaiba Al-Janabi 1997
- The Mute directed by Samir Zidane 1999
- The Poet of the Casbah, directed by Mohamed Tawfik, 1999
- 21st century
- From 2000 to 2010
- Silence of the Noise - Directed by Hussein Al-Salman 2001
- Jabbar, directed by Jamal Amin in 2001
- Spare Parts Movie - Director Gamal Amin - 2005
- Virus movie directed by Gamal Amin 2008
- Life Makers, directed by Gamal Amin, 2002
- Gian, directed by Jano Roshbiani 2002
- Baghdad, an Absent City, directed by Saad Salman 2002
- Forget Baghdad, directed by Samir Gamal El-Din 2002
- Return to Babylon, directed by Abbas Fadhel 2002
- Invalid Directed by Adi Rashid Screenplay by Adi Rashid Haider Helou Faris Haram Directed and Cinematographed by Ziad Turki, 2003
- The Time of the Reed Man, directed by Amer Alwan 2003
- 16 Hours in Baghdad, directed by Tariq Hashim 2004
- We are Iraqis, directed by Abbas Fadhel 2004
- Will to Live, directed by Haider Al-Askari 2005
- Ablution with Blood, directed by Hassan Qasim, 2005, winner of the Creativity Award from the Ministry of Culture for the year 2010.
- Spare Parts, directed by Gamal Amin, 2006
- Dreams, directed by Mohamed Al-Daraji 2007
- www.gilgamesh.21Directed by Tarek Hashem 2007
- Dawn of the World, directed by Abbas Fadel 2008
- The Barber Naeem (2010) directed by Mohamed Naeem
- Thinking of Leaving (2008) by Heba Bassem
- Dr. Nabil (2007) directed by Ahmed Jabbar
- Candle for Al-Shabandar Cafe (2007) directed by Imad Ali
- Dialogue (2005) by Kifaya Saleh
- Towards Paradise Directed by Ayas Jihad 2002
- Amal directed by Ayas Jihad 2007
- Nightmares directed by Ayas Jihad 2009
- Illusion directed by Saad Al-Asami 2009
- Son of Babylon directed by Mohamed Al-Daraji 2009
- (Strangers in Their Own Homeland) Directed by Hashem Al-Aifari (2010)
- Concrete Ayas Jihad 2010
- From 2011 to 2020
- (Smile Again) Directed by Hashem Al-Aifari (2011)
- We do not represent, directed by Amir Ehsan, 2012
- Miserable Memories Directed by Saad Al-Asami 2012
- Interpretations - Directed by Hussein Al Salman 2012
- Applause - Directed by Hussein Al Salman 2012
- Ambulance Driver - Hadi Mahoud 2013
- Mercy of the Bullet - Filmed and directed by Ahmed Al-Hajjaj 2013
- Waiting Decision - Filmed and Directed by Ahmed Al-Hajjaj 2013
- Security Breach movie directed by Hussein Al-Shabani 2012
- The film "Meet the Abuse with Kindness" - directed by Ali Saeed - starring Haider Hussein - 2013
- Death of Citizen S - Directed by Mustafa Al-Ajoudi 2013
- Smiling - Directed by Hussein Al Salman 2015
- Laugh - Directed by Hussein Al Salman 2015

== Alphabetical order ==
0-9

- 2:30 min (2016)
- 1988 (2023)

A

- Ahlaam (2006)
- Alia et Issam (1948)
- Amira wal-nahr, al- (1982)
- Ana Al-Irak (1961)
- Another Day (1978)
- Aouda il al Rif, Al (1963)
- Arouss Al-Phurate (1956)
- Arzu ile Kamber (1952)
- Ashiq, al- (1985)
- Asuar, al- (1979)
- Ayyam al-tawila, al- (1980)
- Alhodood Almultahebah (1986)

B

- Basra sa'a Hidash (1963)
- Babel habibiti (1988)
- Back to Babylon (Retour à Babylone) (2002)
- Boy of Baghdad (2004)
- Bekhal's Tears (2005) Kurdish
- Blood of My Brother: A Story of Death in Iraq, The (2005)
- Bekas (2012) Kurdish
- Baghdad Messi (2024)

C

- Churches in Iraq (1988)
- Clash of Loyalties (1983)
- El clásico (2015)

D

- Dawn of the World (L'Aube du monde) (2008)
- Doktor Hassan, Al (1960)
- Dol (2007) Kurdish
- The Dreams of Sparrows (2005)

E

- Europa (2021)

H

- Heroes Are Born Twice (1977)
- Houses in That Alley (1978)
- Hudud al Multahiba, al- (1986)

I

- In My Mother's Arms (2011)
- Iraq: War, Love, God & Madness (2010)
- Iraq in Fragments (2006)
- Irhamuni (1957)

J

- Jiyan (2002) Kurdish

K

- Kilomètre zéro (2005) Kurdish
- Kitar al Scia Saba (1961)

L

- Lakposhtha hâm parvaz mikonand (2004)
- Layali al-azab (1964)

M

- Marsiyeh barf (2005)
- Mas' Ala Al-Kubra, al- (1983)
- Mashour zowaje (1961)
- Memories on Stone (2014)
- Min al mass'oul (1956)

N

- Nabokodnassar (1960)
- Nadam (1954)
- Nahr, al- (1977)
- Naima (1963)
- Niwemang (2006)

P

- Poet of Cane, The (2000)

Q

- Qadisiya, al- (1981)
- Qannas, al- (1981)

R

- Ras, al- (1976)

S

- Son of Babylon (2010)
- Said effendi (1957)
- Sari's Mother (2006)
- Sea Clamor (1987)

T

- Tiswahun (1955)
- The Situation in Lebanon (1977)

U

- U nergiz biskivin (2006)
- Underexposure (2005)

V

- Voices of Iraq (2004)

W

- We Iraqis (Nous les Irakiens) (2004)
- Warda (1956)
- Warrak al-Kharif (1964)
- Where Is Gilgamesh? (2024) Kurdish
- WMD: Weapon of Mass Destruction (2004)

Y

- Yadul Kadar (1964)

Z

- Zamioun, al- (1973)
- Zaman Al-Hob (1990)
- Zaman, the Man from the Reeds (2004)

== See also ==
- Cinema of Iraq
