= Cinema of Iraq =

- No. of screens: 300 (before 2003)

Produced feature films
- Total: 100+ (2003)

Iraq has one of the most significant and diverse film industries in the Middle East. The Iraqi cinema consists of film production notably in Arabic, Kurdish and Syriac languages. The film industry of Iraq is primarily based in Baghdad, which is home to numerous filmmakers, artists, writers and musicians.

The history of Iraqi cinema dates back to the beginning of the 20th century, where American silent films were played in cinema halls in Baghdad. Under the rule of King Faisal II, an Iraqi cinema production began and developed during the later regime of Saddam Hussein. However, the Iraq War of the early 21st century had a heavy impact on the film industry and brought film production to a near halt. Supporting infrastructure was destroyed and a large number of artists left the country. After the end of the war, a new generation of filmmakers have been exploring opportunities in Iraq. Movies and TV shows produced in Iraq have become popular across the Arab world. The development of film production and cinema-going in Iraq reflects the drastic historical shifts that Iraq has experienced since the 20th century.

== History ==
While Iraq's first film projection took place in 1909, cinema was not truly regarded as a cultural activity or pastime until the 1920s. The first cinemas, like the famous al-Zawra'a Cinema on Baghdad's bustling thoroughfare al-Rasheed Street, played mostly American silent films for British citizens.

In the 1940s under the rule of King Faisal II of Iraq, a real Iraqi cinema began. Supported by British and French financiers, movie production companies established themselves in Baghdad. The Baghdad Studio was established in 1948, but soon came apart when tensions between the Arab and Jewish founders flared up. The country's first feature film, Alia and Essam was produced in 1948. It was directed by French filmmaker André Chotin, and the Iraqi Jewish writer Anwar Shaul wrote the screenplay. For the most part, the films of that early period were purely commercial, fluffy romances with plenty of singing and dancing, often set in small villages. The World of Arts (Dunyat Alfann) studio, which was founded by actors, reached for more serious fare. In 1955, they produced Haidar Al-Omar's Fitna wa Hassan, an Iraqi retelling of Romeo and Juliet that received international attention. But for the most part, the restrictions imposed by the state discouraged any socially relevant films.

In 1959 when King Faisal II's government was overthrown, the General Organization for Cinema and Theater came into existence with the purpose of promoting the political goals of the new regime both in documentaries and features. Typical were documentaries like the 1969 Al Maghishi Project, which showcased the government's irrigation campaigns and the 1967 A Wedding in Heaven, which celebrates the air force and their weapons system.

=== Ba'ath Party rule ===
The 1968 revolution that put the Ba'ath party in power further solidified the government's control of film material, and the state's need to make all films validate its power. During this stage, the Iraqi government, represented by the General Organization for Cinema and Theater, produced several important films.

Saddam Hussein's ascension to power in 1979 pushed the Iraqi cinema in a slightly different direction. The drain on national resources from the 1980 Iran–Iraq War brought film production to a near halt. The few films put into production were mainly intent on glorifying a mythic Iraqi history or celebrating Saddam's rule. In 1981, the government commissioned Egyptian filmmaker Salah Abouseif to make Al-Qadisiya, a period epic recounting the triumph of the Arabs over the Persians in 636 AD. Likewise Mohamed Shukri Jameel's melodramatic The Great Question (al-Mas' Ala Al-Kubra) cast British actor Oliver Reed as the vicious Lt-Col Gerard Leachman who is righteously killed in the 1920 Iraqi revolution.

In 1980 Hussein promoted his own mythology with the autobiographical 6-hour epic The Long Days (al-Ayyam al-tawila), the saga of Hussein's participation in the 1958 failed assassination attempt on Prime Minister Abd al-Karim Qasim, and his subsequent heroic escape back to Tikrit. The film was edited and partially directed by Terence Young, the British director who made his name helming the early James Bond films Dr. No and Thunderball. Hussein is played by Saddam Kamel, a cousin and son-in-law of Saddam's, who eventually ran afoul of the leader and was murdered in 1996.

Prior to 1991, there were nearly 300 cinemas in Iraq. After Iraq started attacks against Kuwait, sanctions against Iraq and later the 2003 invasion made filmmaking an impossibility in the country, although a new generation of filmmakers was coming alive in Baghdad. Among the few films produced by Iraq during that period was the 1993 film King Ghazi, written and scripted by Moaz Yousef, and directed by Mohammed Shukri Jamil. The film dealt with the biography of King Ghazi, who ruled Iraq in the 1930s.

=== 2003 to present ===
The Iraqi Independent Film Center was established in 2003. In 2014 the Ministry of Culture allocated millions of dollars to fund film production, but as of 2021, only one film project has been supported.

== Notable Iraqi Actors ==
- Lewis Alsamari, (1976–), starred in the Universal Pictures film United 93
- Yasmine Hanani, featured in documentary films Voices of Iraq, My Country, My Country and Battle for Haditha
- Don Hany, (1975–), (Won Best Actor for Winning the Peace (2005) and known for his role as Theo Rahme in White Collar Blue
- Heather Raffo (Iraqi-American born in Michigan), Award-winning playwright/actress most known for her role in 9 Parts of Desire
- Basam Ridha

== Notable Iraqi Film directors ==
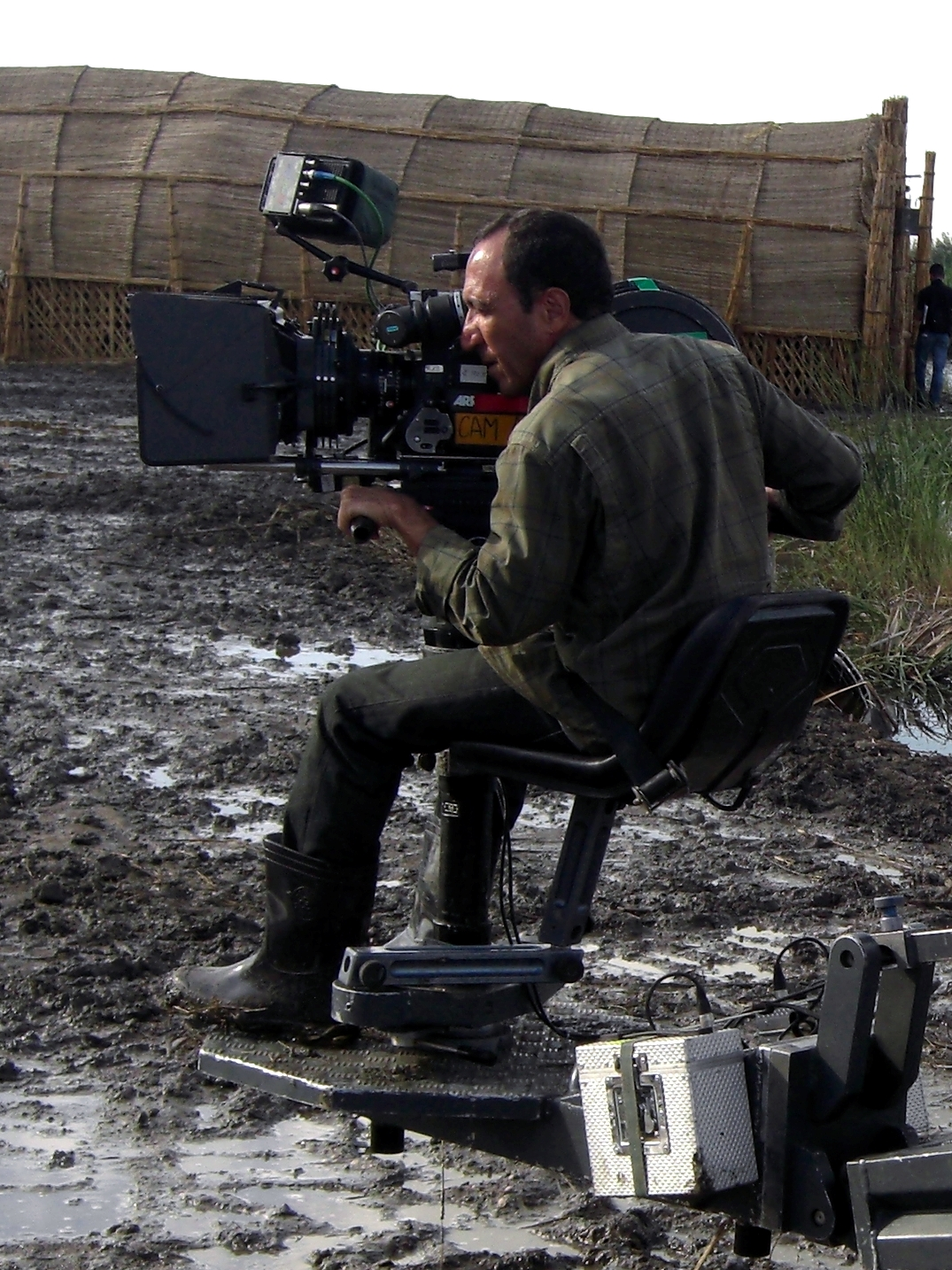
The Iraqi director Abbas Fahdel on the set of Dawn of the World

- Ibraham Alzubaidy
- Abbas Fahdel, director of Dawn of the World
- Usama Alshaibi, director of Muhammad and Jane and Nice Bombs
- Amer Alwan, known for winning an award for Zaman, The Man From The Reeds
- Zana Briski, director of Born into Brothels
- Ishtar Yasin Gutiérrez, Soviet-born Iraqi Chilean-Costa Rican director, screenwriter, producer and actress.
- Anisa Mehdi, Emmy Award-winning film director, journalist and director of Inside Mecca
- Najeen
- Shero Rauf
- Maysoon Pachachi, director of Return to the Land of Wonders
- Rashed Radwan
- Saad Salman, film director known for his documentary Baghdad On/Off
- Baz Shamoun, film director and maker of short documentary Where is Iraq?
- Oday Rasheed, director and writer, Underexposure and Qarantina
- Mohamed Al-Daradji, director of Ahlaam and Son of Babylon
- Mohanad Hayal, director of Haifa Street
- Ali Raheem, director of Balanja

== Films shot in Iraq ==
- The Exorcist (1973) – Hatra was used as the setting for the opening scene.
- Back to Babylon (2002) – A documentary film shot in Babylon, Hilla, Baghdad and Hīt.
- ZAMAN, The Man Who Lives in the Reeds (2003) – A feature film by Amer Alwan.
- The War Tapes (2003)
- About Baghdad (2003) – A documentary film shot in Baghdad.
- Underexposure (2005) – A docufiction, the first feature film after the American occupation began in 2003.
- We Iraqis (2004) – A documentary film shot in Baghdad, Hilla and Hīt.
- Ahlaam (2004) – A feature film by Mohamed Al Daradji.
- Voices of Iraq (2004)
- Gunner Palace (2005)
- Valley of the Wolves: Iraq (2006) – The film is set in northern Iraq during the American occupation.
- Nice Bombs (2006) a documentary by Usama Alshaibi was shot in Baghdad in early 2004.
- Iraq in Fragments (2006) – Documentary film on the Iraq War.
- I Want to Live (2015) – Documentary film on refugees of the Syrian civil war.
- My Country, My Country (2006)
- Searching for Hassan (2007) – A documentary film by Edouard Beau. Shot in Mosul.
- Life In Darkness (2018)

== See also ==
- Arab cinema
- Cinema of the world
- Television in Iraq
