= We Iraqis =

- Directed by: Abbas Fahdel
- Written by: Abbas Fahdel
- Produced by: Agat Films & Cie; France 2
- Cinematography: Abbas Fahdel
- Edited by: Stéphane Foucault; Sophie Imbert
- Distributed by: Doc & Co
- Release date: 2004
- Running time: 52 minutes
- Countries: France; Iraq
- Language: Arabic

We Iraqis (2004) is a documentary film written and directed by the Iraqi-French film director Abbas Fahdel.

The film shows daily life in Baghdad, just before and after the 2003 invasion of Iraq. In this film, Fahdel’s camera shows us Iraqis in another light and the hopes and fears of these men and women who escaped the nightmare of a dictatorship only to be mired in chaos.

- French title: Nous les Irakiens
- Arabic title: نحن العراقيون

The film is a sequel to the documentary Back to Babylon shot by Fahdel in 2002, in which he returns to Baghdad from France after decades in exile.

== Synopsis ==
Opening with a protest in Paris against the impending war in Iraq on February 15, 2003, the film documents Fahdel's observations of Baghdad before the fighting breaks out. He joins his brother's family as they prepare for the outbreak of war. The director returns to France when the war starts and loses contact with his family.

When Fahdel comes back to Baghdad two months later, after the fall of Saddam Hussein's regime, he finds the horrors of the dictatorship replaced by chaos. Amid the destruction, the people show that there is still hope for the future.

The director concludes, "I came to film death, but life got the upper hand."

== Awards ==
- Mention of the Jury, 15th African, Asian and Latin American Film Festival, Milan, Italy, 2005

== Special selections ==
- FIPA (International Festival of Audiovisual Programmes [archive)), Biarritz, 2004
- Amiens International Film Festival, 2004
- Film days in Carthage, Tunisia, 2004
- Biennale des Cinémas Arabes, Paris, 2004
- Biennale des Cinémas Arabes, Marseille, 2004
- Arabisches Film Festival, Tobingen, 2004
- Social Visions 2005 [archive), Cannes Film Festival 2005.
- African Film Festival, Asia and Latin America, Milan, 2005

== See also ==
- Cinema of Iraq
- Iraqi culture
- Iraq War
