= Abbas Fahdel =

Iraqi-France film director and screenwriter

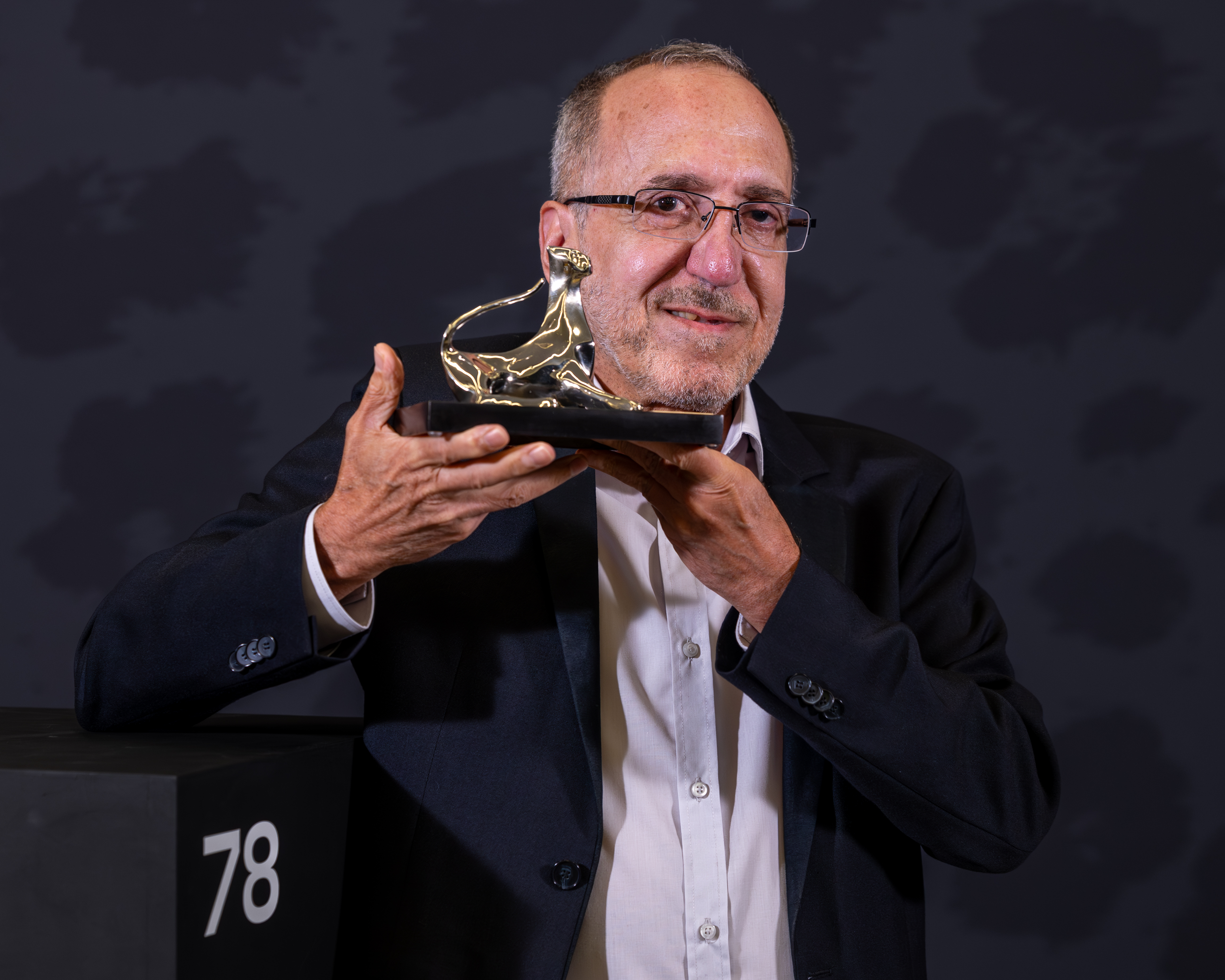
Fahdel in 2025

Abbas Fadhel (Arabic: عباس فاضل) is an Iraqi-French film director, screenwriter and film critic, born in Babylon, Iraq. Most known for his 2015 film Homeland: Iraq Year Zero.

== Career ==
Based in France since the age of 18 years, he studied cinema at the Sorbonne University until Ph.D.

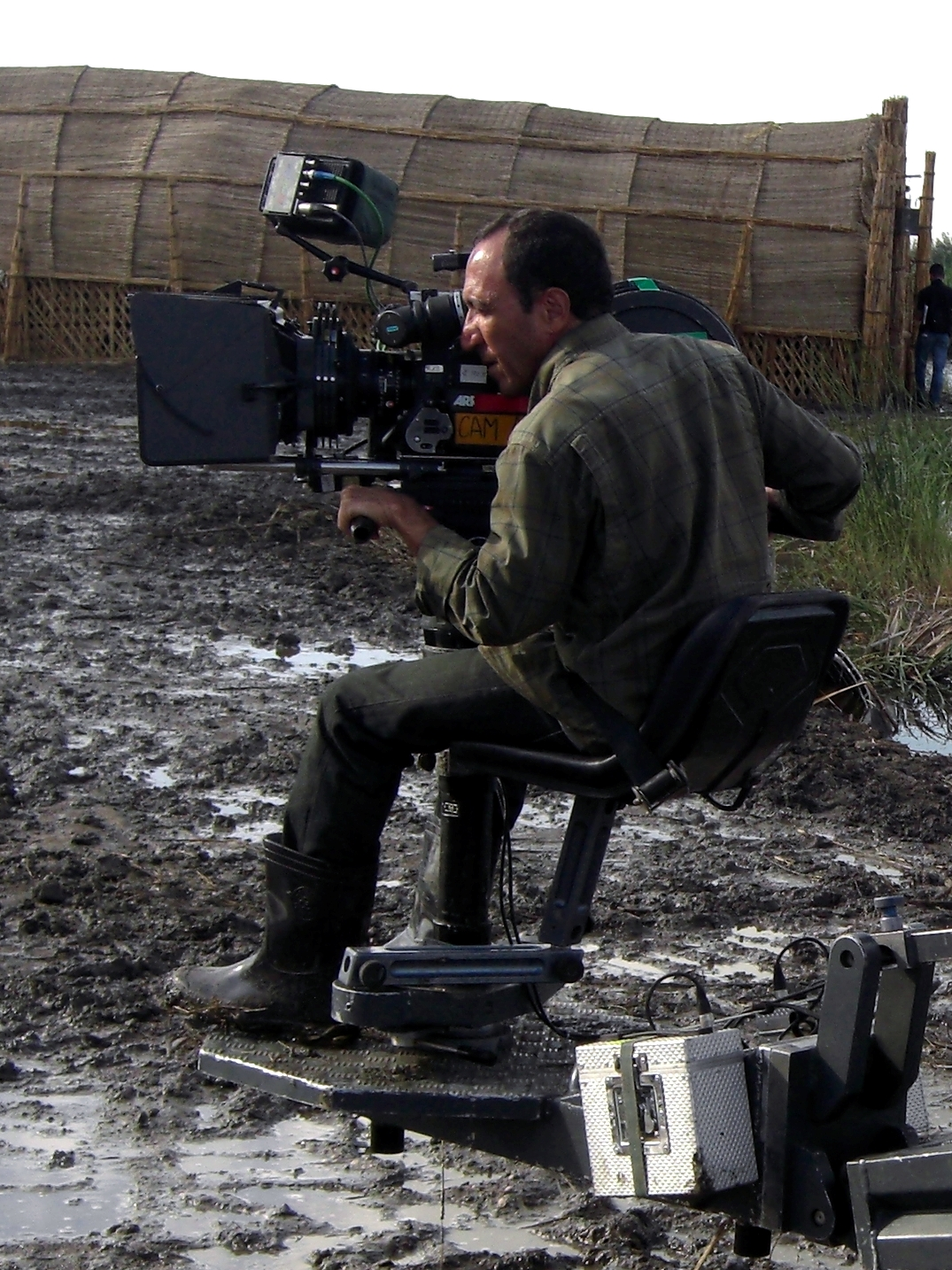
Abbas Fadhel on the set of Dawn of the World

In January 2002, he returned to Iraq with a French passport and filmed a documentary film, Back to Babylon, in which he asked himself: "What have my childhood friends become? How have their lives changed? What would my life have been like if I hadn't chosen to build my destiny elsewhere?" The country's dramatic situation is the background of this introspective investigation.

One year later, in February 2003, when a new war seems imminent, Abbas Fadhel returned to Iraq with the intention of filming his family and friends, and the superstitious hope of protecting them against the dangers threatening them. When the war started, he returned to France and lost all contact with his family. Two months later, he again returned to Iraq and discovered a country shaken by violence, the nightmare of dictatorship replaced by chaos, but a country where, nonetheless, everything remains possible: the best or the worse. This historical moment is the theme of his second documentary film, We Iraqis.

In 2008, he directed the feature film Dawn of the World, a war-drama in which he gives an unexpected account of the multiple impacts of the Gulf Wars and how they have dramatically damaged an area known to be the geographic location of the biblical Garden of Eden.

In 2015, Fadhel premiered Homeland: Iraq Year Zero, a monumental documentary of 334 minutes tackling life in Iraq before the American Invasion of Iraq and during the subsequent Iraq War.

== Filmography ==
Year	English Title	Original Title	Notes
2002	Back to Babylon	العودة إلى بابل	Documentary film
2004	We Iraqis	نحن العراقيون	Jury Mention at the 15th African, Asian and Latin American Film Festival, Milan, Italy, 2005
2008	Dawn of the World	فجر العالم	Premiere at the Busan International Film Festival
2015	Homeland: Iraq Year Zero	وطن: العراق السنة صفر	Premiere ar the Visions du réel, 2015
2018	Yara	يارا	
2019	Bitter Bread	حقّ الخُبزات	
2022	Tales of the Purple House	حكايات البيت الأرجواني	
2025	Tales of the Wounded Land		Pardo for Best Direction at the 78th Locarno Film Festival

=== Short films ===
- Things in the shadow
- Weegee's World
- Sunday at a suburban café

== Awards ==
- Sesterce d'Or (Best Feature Film Award - International Competition), Festival Visions du réel, 2015, for Homeland (Iraq Year Zero).
- Doc Alliance Selection Award, Locarno International Film Festival, 2015, for Homeland (Iraq Year Zero).
- White Goose Award (Best Feature Film Award - International Competition), DMZ International Documentary Film Festival, 2015, for Homeland (Iraq Year Zero).
- Award of Excellence (International Competition), and Citizens' Prize) at Yamagata International Documentary Film Festival, 2015, for Homeland (Iraq Year Zero).
- Best Film award, Gulf Film Festival, 2009, for Dawn of the World.
- Audience Award and NETPAC Award, Vesoul International Film Festival of Asian Cinema, 2009, for Dawn of the World.
- Best Film award, 20th Fameck Arab Film Festival, 2009, for Dawn of the World.
- Great Prize of the Jury, Rabat International Film Festival, 2009, for Dawn of the World.
- Great Prize for the best scriptwriter (Grand Prix du Meilleur Scénariste, SOPADIN), for Dawn of the World.
- Best Screenplay Award (Trophée du Premier Scénario, Centre National de la Cinématographie), for Dawn of the World.
- Best Screenplay Award, 9th Beirut International Film Festival, 2009, for Dawn of the World.
- Prize of the Jury, 15th African, Asian and Latin American Film Festival, Milano, Italy, 2005, for We Iraqis.
- The Shield of the Ministry of Culture, Iraq, 2010.
- Honorary Diploma of the Ministry of Culture, Iraq, 2010.

== See also ==
- Cinema of Iraq
- Iraqi culture
