= Homeland: Iraq Year Zero =

- Directed by: Abbas Fahdel
- Cinematography: Abbas Fahdel
- Edited by: Abbas Fahdel
- Release date: April 23, 2015 (Visions du réel)
- Running time: 334 minutes
- Country: Iraq
- Language: Arabic

Homeland: Iraq Year Zero is a 2015 documentary film written and directed by the Iraqi-French film director Abbas Fahdel.

== Synopsis ==
Chronicles of everyday life in Iraq before and after the U.S. invasion.

== Awards ==
- Sesterce d'Or (Best Feature Film Award - International Competition), Festival Visions du réel, 2015
- Doc Alliance Selection Award, Locarno International Film Festival, 2015
- White Goose Award (Best Feature Film Award - International Competition), DMZ International Documentary Film Festival, 2015.
- Award of Excellence (International Competition), and Citizens' Prize, Yamagata International Documentary Film Festival, 2015.
- Grand Prize and People's Choice Award, RIDM (Rencontres Internationales du Documentaire de Montréal), 2015.
- Silver Tanit, Carthage Film Festival, 2015.
- Jury Prize, Milano Filmmaker Festival, 2015.
- Public Award, Festival Internacional de Cine UNAM (FICUNAM), Mexico, 2016.

== See also ==
- Cinema of Iraq
- Iraqi culture
