= Mohammed Hussein Abdul Rahim =

- محمد حسين عبد الرحيم
- Born: 25 February 1955 (age 70); Baghdad, Iraq
- Citizenship: Palestine
- Occupation(s): actor, radio announcer
- Years active: 1979- present
- Known for: Days off ('ayam al'iijaza); Beware of these; Babylon My Beloved!; Thread and sparrow (alkhayt waleasfur); Building No. 13; Night wolves(Theyab Al-Lail)
- Website: https://www.imdb.com/name/nm11609407/

Muhammad Hussein Abdul Rahim (Arabic: محمد حسين عبد الرحيم; born 25 February 1955) is an Iraqi comedian and icon the Iraqi people used to watch on the screen since 1979. He is one of a generation took place after a fabulous names of comedians arose with the beginning of the television broadcast and the TV drama in Iraq during the 1950s and 1960s. Iraqi television was the first Arab-language television broadcast in the Middle East.

== Early life ==
Abdul Rahim is a comedian who started his artistic career during high school days as a participant in student singing festivals, until he took place in student plays, as it was his first time on stage, after that, in collage, and while he was studying at the Faculty of Literature, where He majored in the English language, the committees from other colleges such as science and engineering competed to make him participate in their theatrical and artistic activities. After graduating from university he decided to work in the field of acting and went to the radio and television department, There were 3 test subjects, and he did not know that it was a test for a news anchor, but he managed to pass the test with distinction that attracted the attention and was assigned to Radio Baghdad, to be the first radio program he presented, it called "what the listeners ask". After that, and step by step, from radio to TV to the cinema, he became very popular on any shows he performs.

== First Palestinian to obtain the Iraqi passport ==
Actor Muhammad Hussein Abdul Rahim is the first Palestinian to obtain an Iraqi passport. Prime Minister Mustafa Al-Kadhimi ordered to give Iraqi nationality to the actor but he could not pass this order.

The Council of Ministers approves granting Iraqi passports to the actor's family (all Palestinians, born and residing in Iraq), because it is not possible to grant them Iraqi nationality, based on Article 6 Second of the Iraqi Nationality Law No. 26 of 2006.

The law on residency of foreigners in Iraq that a Palestinian who has resided for a period of 10 years obtains all the rights and duties of a citizen with the exception of obtaining citizenship and participating in elections by voting and candidacy, in order to guarantee the right to return to his homeland.

The appeal of the actor, to grant him Iraqi nationality, came through a phone call made during the visit of the Secretary-General of the Armed Forces to his home in Baghdad. According to a video clip, Mustafa Al-Kadhimi spoke to Abdul Rahim via a phone call, to check on his health and express support and help for him, after that, the actor directed a request to grant him Iraqi nationality after about 47 years of his presence in Iraq, The actor is from Palestinian origin, but he was born and lived in Iraq his entire life.

== Filmography ==
Muhammad Hussein Abdul Rahim played many successful roles at the level of cinema, theater, television, and even radio. As much as he is a star and comedian loved by people, this comic artist succeeded in winning the love of people with his tragic roles in a way that made them think that this actor has nothing to do with comedy.

=== cinema ===
- Building No. 13 (1987)
- Babylon My Beloved! (1988)
- Two sides in the picture (1989)
- Tomorrow's place(1991)

=== TV ===
- Memory terminals (1979)
- Days off ('ayam al'iijaza) (Two Seasons: 1992, 2019)
- Night wolves(Theyab Al-Lail) (1992)
- The best words

=== Theater ===
- Beware of these
- Thread and sparrow (alkhayt waleasfur) (1983)
- The outskirts of the city (1994)

== See also ==
- Cinema of Iraq
- Iraqi National Theatre
