= Return to the Land of Wonders =

- Directed by: Maysoon Pachachi
- Produced by: Maysoon Pachachi
- Narrated by: Maysoon Pachachi
- Cinematography: Maysoon Pachachi
- Edited by: Anne Even; Maysoon Pachachi; Gary Sims
- Distributed by: Arab Film Distribution
- Release date: 27 April 2004 (U.S.)
- Running time: 88 minutes
- Country: Iraq
- Languages: Arabic; English
- Budget: $5,000
- Box office: $1,338

Return to the Land of Wonders is a documentary film made almost single-handedly by Maysoon Pachachi in 2003–04.

Pachachi went returned to Iraq after an absence of 30 years when her father, Adnan Pachachi, was appointed to the Iraqi Governing Council in the aftermath of the invasion of Iraq. She brought a video camera with her to document conditions in Iraq and her father's participation in the drafting of Iraq's interim constitution.

== Reception ==
On Metacritic, Return to the Land of Wonders holds a 60 out of a 100 rating based on 5 critics, indicating "mixed or average reviews". Bill Gibron of PopMatters gave the film a rating 6 out of 10, while the New York Magazine called it "Absorbing. . . depicts the Iraq situation with a rarely seen degree of complexity".
