= Back to Babylon (film) =

- Directed by: Abbas Fahdel
- Produced by: Blanche Guichou
- Cinematography: Abbas Fahdel; Amer Alwan
- Edited by: Sylvie Gadmer
- Music by: Sami Kaftan
- Distributed by: Doc & Co
- Release date: 2002
- Running time: 52 minutes
- Countries: France; Iraq
- Language: Arabic

Back to Babylon (Arabic: العودة إلى بابل, French: Retour à Babylone) is a documentary film directed by the Iraqi-French film director Abbas Fahdel.

== Synopsis ==
Back in his home town of Babylon after a long exile, the Iraqi-born director Abbas Fahdel asks himself: "What has become of my friends? What has life here made of them? What would life here have made of me had I not decided to follow the course of destiny elsewhere?" In his search and inquiries, his encounters with the friends of his youth, it is the situation today in Iraq that is revealed through the camera's eye: the ravages of Saddam Hussein's dictatorship, the after-effects of the Iran-Iraq war, the Gulf War and the embargo imposed by the United Nations.

== See also ==
- Cinema of Iraq
- Iraqi culture
