= Daisy Al-Amir =

Iraqi writer, poet and novelist

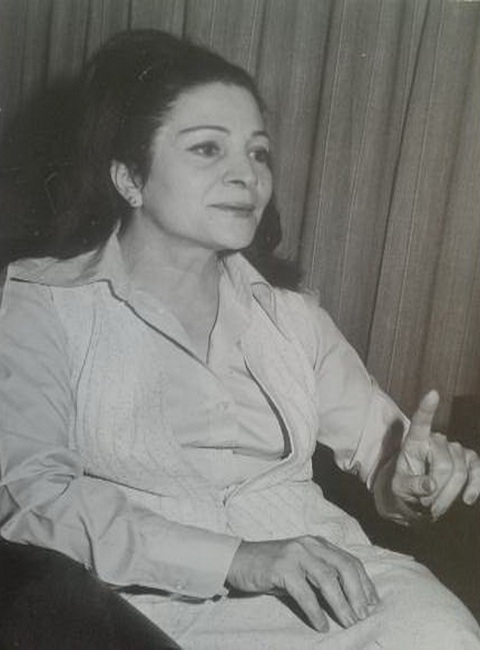
Daisy Al-Amir, late 1970s.

Daisy Al-Amir (Arabic: ديزي الأمير), often referred to as simply Dayzi Amir, is an Iraqi writer, poet and novelist. She is author of The Waiting List: An Iraqi Woman's Tales of Alienation has renowned her as one of the leading female writers of Iraq.

== Biography ==
Daisy Al-Amir was born in Alexandria, Egypt in 1935 to an Iraqi father and a Lebanese mother. Her family did not stay in Egypt for very long, moving to her father’s homeland Iraq when she was only a few weeks old. After earning her Bachelor’s Degree from the Teachers’ Training College of Baghdad, Daisy al-Amir went to Cambridge to study and write her thesis on Arabic Literature. Her father refused to pay tuition, however, and on her trip home, she stopped in Beirut where she found a job as a secretary in the Iraqi embassy. She chose to remain in Beirut. She was eventually promoted to the job of Assistant Press Attaché. In 1975, when the civil war broke out in Lebanon, she was appointed director of the Iraqi Cultural Center. She returned to Iraq in 1982 after the Israeli invasion of Lebanon. Her stories reflect women’s experiences during turbulent times in the Middle East including during the Lebanese civil war, and during the rise to power of Saddam Hussein in Iraq. Daisy al-Amir is the author of five published works including: Al Balad al-Baid Alladhi Tuhibbuhu (The Distant Country that You Love), 1964, Thumma Tauda al-Mawja (Then the Wave Returns), 1969, Fi Dawwamat al-Hubb wa al-Karahiya (In the Vortex of Love and Hate), 1979 and Wu'ud li-l-bay' (Promises for Sale, 1981) about the Lebanese civil war, and Ala la’ihat al-intizar, (The Waiting List: An Iraqi Woman’s Tales of Alienation), 1994.

Here the alienation is that of a cultural refugee, a divorced woman who is educated, affluent, and alone.

Al-Amir's prose is influenced by a long tradition of Iraqi poetry.

== Bibliography ==
- The Waiting List: An Iraqi Woman's Tales of Alienation ISBN 978-0-292-79067-4
- An Andalusian Tale
- The Distant Country that You Love
- Then the Wave Returns
- In the Vortex of Love and Hate
- Promises for Sale
