= Dawn of the World =

- Directed by: Abbas Fahdel
- Written by: Abbas Fahdel
- Produced by: Ghumlun Productions
- Starring: Hafsia Herzi; Hiam Abbass; Karim Saleh
- Cinematography: Gilles Porte
- Edited by: Sylvie Gadmer
- Music by: Jürgen Knieper
- Production companies: 27 Films Production; ADR Productions
- Distributed by: Rézo Films; Prime Pictures
- Release date: 5 October 2008 (Pusan International Film Festival)
- Running time: 95 minutes
- Countries: France; Germany; Iraq
- Language: Arabic
- Budget: €1.4 million

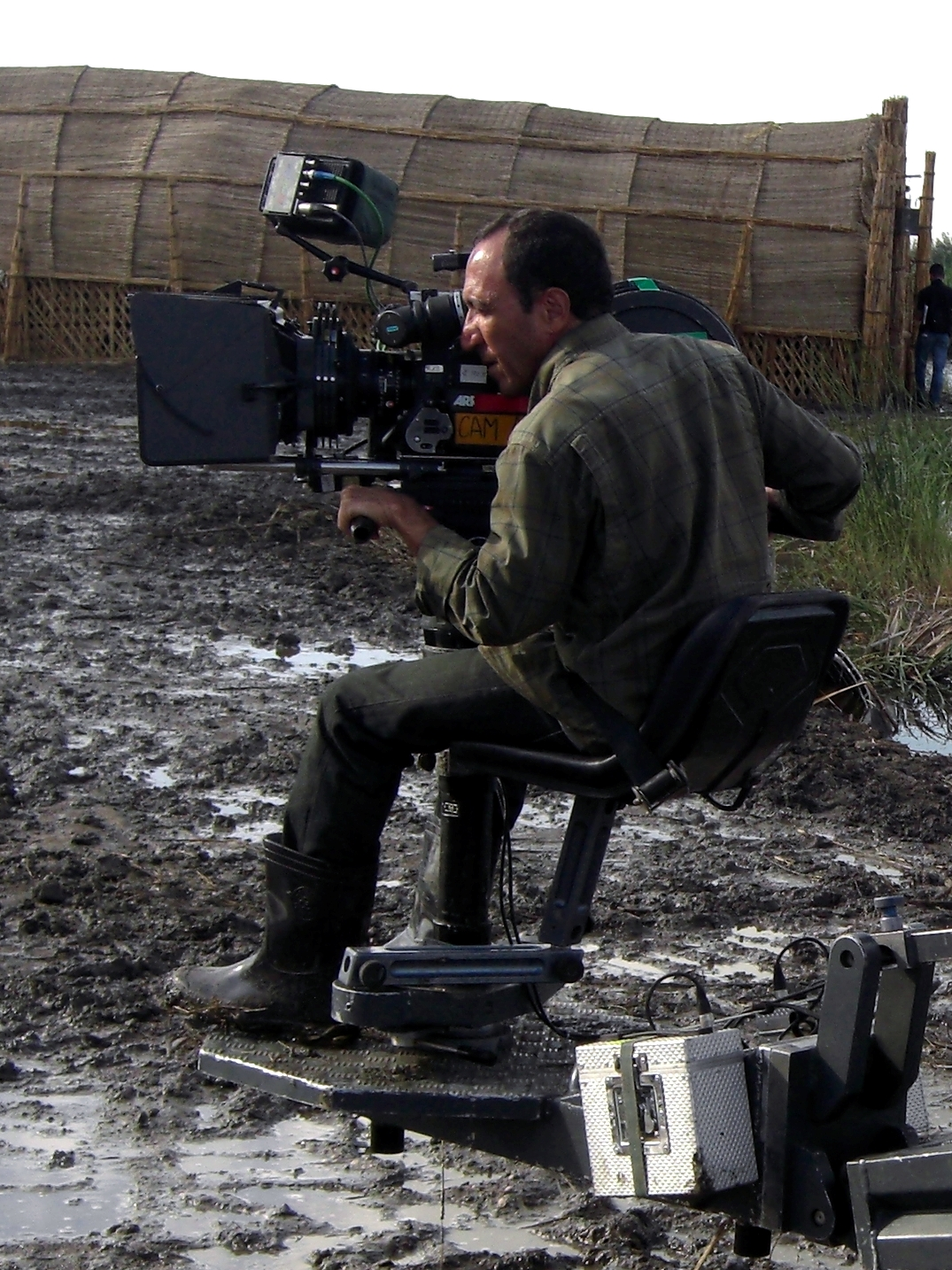
The director Abbas Fahdel on the set of Dawn of the World

Dawn of the World is a feature film written and directed by the Iraqi-French film director Abbas Fahdel.

Starring Venice Film Festival revelation Hafsia Herzi (The Secret of the Grain) and Hiam Abbass (The Lemon Tree, The Visitor), Dawn of the World gives an unexpected account of the multiple impacts of the Iran–Iraq War, the Gulf War and the 1991 uprisings in Iraq. The film shows how these conflicts have damaged an area claimed to be the geographic location of the Garden of Eden.

- French title: L'Aube du monde
- Arabic title: فجر العالم

== Plot ==
The Mesopotamian Marshes, at the delta of the Euphrates and Tigris rivers, lie in the south of Iraq. This is where Mastour and Zahra, two young Marsh Arabs, grow up. Shortly after their marriage, Mastour and Zahra are forced to separate when the Gulf War breaks out. On the battlefield, Mastour befriends Riad, a young soldier from Baghdad. Mortally wounded, Mastour makes Riad promise to protect Zahra when the war is over. When Riad arrives in the village, he falls deeply in love with Zahra. But unable to bear the loss of her husband, Zahra shuts herself off. In this completely foreign environment that is hostile to this newcomer, and as a new conflict is on the verge of inflaming the whole area, Riad will do the impossible to find his place.

== Screenplay ==
Before being brought to the screen, the screenplay of Dawn of the World won the Grand Prix for the Best Screenwriter(Grand Prix du Meilleur Scénariste) in France.

Drafted by the éQuinoxe screenwriters' workshops, the screenplay was read and discussed over a week, in Paris, by a group of directors and screenwriters.

== Music ==
The original music is composed by German Jürgen Knieper.

The soundtrack includes Massive Attack's song Hymn of the Big Wheel (album Blue Lines) and two songs of the Palestinian singer Rim Banna: Jammal and Ya Lel Ma Atwalak (album Lullabies from the Axis of Evil).

== Cast ==
- Hafsia Herzi as Zahra
- Karim Saleh as Riad
- Hiam Abbass as Mastour's mother
- Waleed Abou El Magd as Mastour
- Sayed Ragab as Hadji Noh

== Awards ==
- Great Prize of the Jury, Rabat International Film Festival, 2009.
- Best Film Award, Gulf Film Festival, 2009.
- Audience Award and NETPAC Award, Vesoul International Film Festival of Asian Cinema, 2009.
- Best Film Award, 20th Fameck Arab Film Festival, 2009.
- Best Screenplay Award, 9th Beirut International Film Festival, 2009
- Grand Prix for the best scriptwriter (Grand Prix du Meilleur Scénariste, SOPADIN), France.
- Best screenplay Award (Trophée du Premier Scénario, Centre National de la Cinématographie), France.
- The Shield of the Ministry of Culture, Iraq, 2010.
- Honorary Diploma of the Ministry of Culture, Iraq, 2010.
- Best Actor Award (Karim Saleh), Rotterdam Arab Film Festival, 2010.

== See also ==
- Cinema of Iraq
- Iraqi culture
