= Oday Rasheed =

Iraqi-American film director and writer (born 1973)

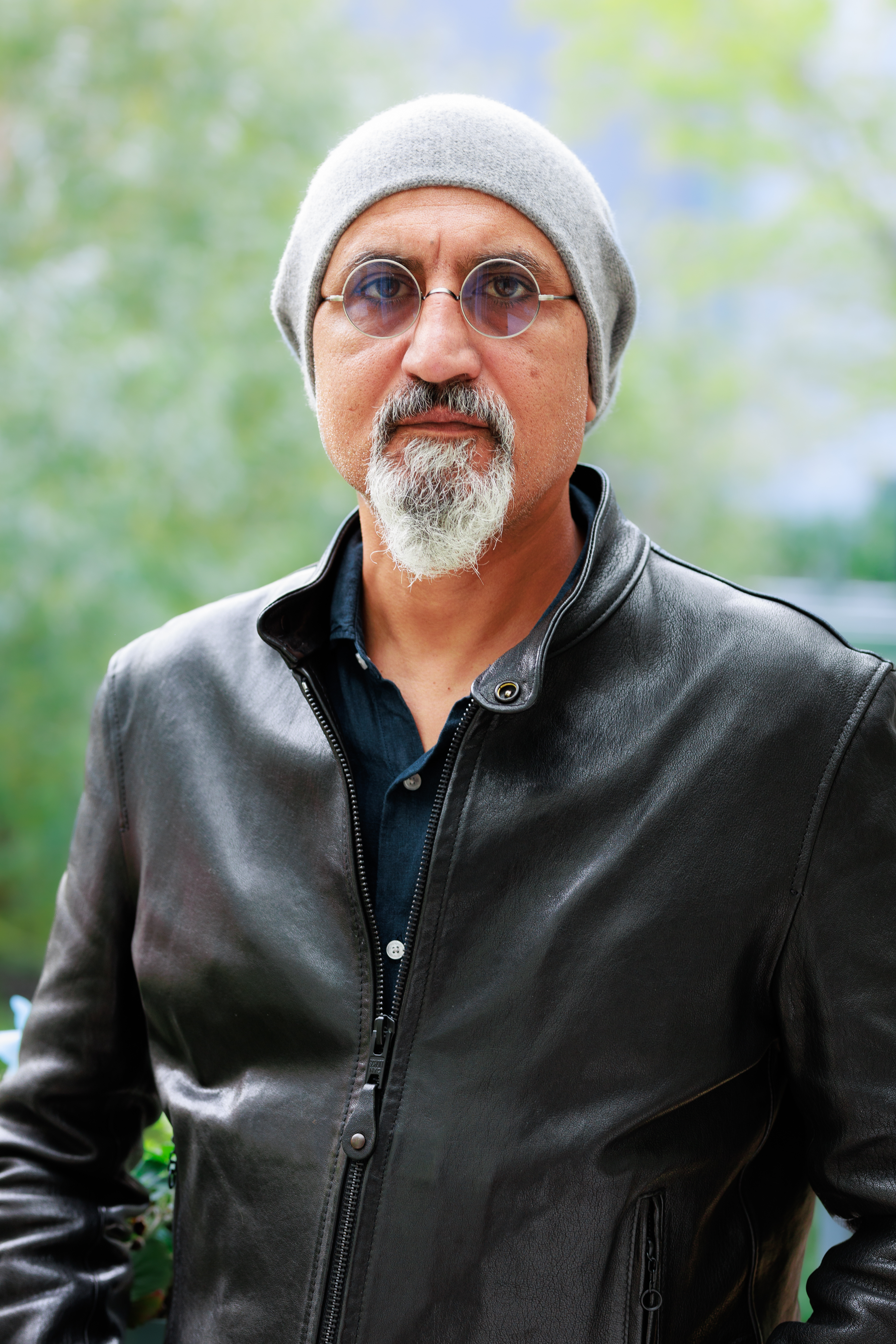

Oday Rasheed ( Arabic:عدي رشيد born June 17, 1973) is an Arab-American film director, screenwriter and producer born and raised in Baghdad, Iraq. Rasheed immigrated to New York City in 2012. He has been living and working in Los Angeles since 2022.

Rasheed's film debut Underexposure (2005) was “billed as the first feature shot in occupied Baghdad” after the U.S. Invasion of Iraq in 2003 where "Oday Rasheed has taken the term 'guerilla filmmaking' to a whole new level," according to Variety Magazine.

== Life ==
Oday Rasheed was born in Baghdad, Iraq. After graduating from high school, he attended but did not graduate from the Institute for Electrical Science, the Institute for Applicable Art and the Faculty for Fine Arts in Baghdad. He went on to work for local newspapers writing film reviews and articles on cinema.

In the early 1990s, Rasheed co-founded an experimental art and theater group, later known as Najeen (survivors). The troupe put on performances merging scenes from writers such as Henry Miller and the beat poets Lawrence Ferlinghetti and Allen Ginsberg. In the later 1990s, Rasheed went on to produce experimental short films.

Oday Rasheed has been particularly concerned about the future of Iraqi cinema and the lack of opportunities available to young filmmakers in his country. As a result he has been engaged in workshops for young filmmakers and in 2008, he co-founded the Iraqi Independent Film Center for young artists.

Rasheed immigrated to the United States in 2012, where he was also an artist in residence at the San Francisco Film Society. He has lectured on film studies at universities across the world from Cinémathèque Française in Paris, Georgetown University, New York University and University of California in the United States, as well as at the Japan Foundation Forum, The Council of Foreign Affairs in NY and others.

== Films ==
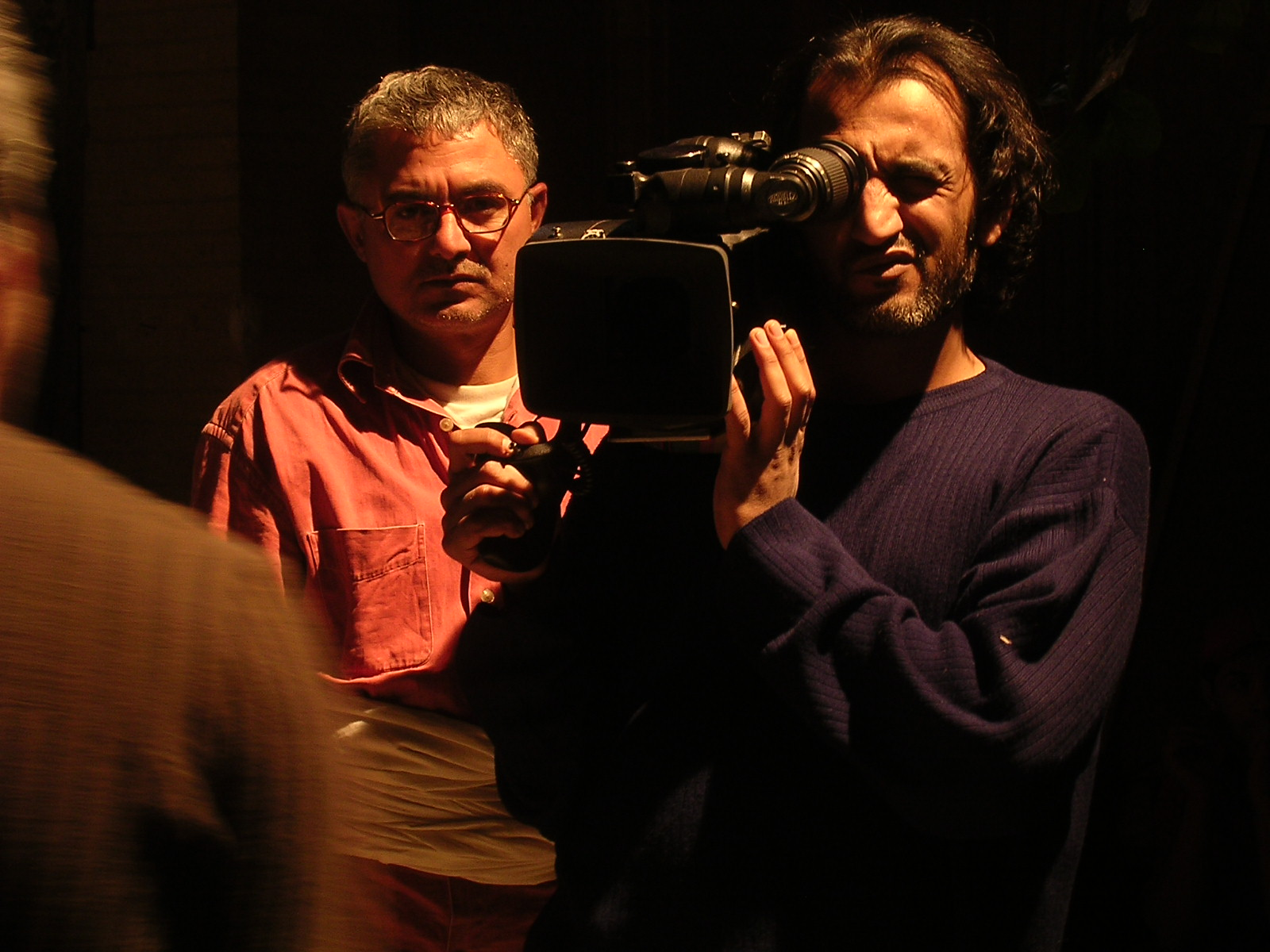
Director Oday Rasheed and DP Ziad Turkey while filming Underexposure in Baghdad 2004

=== Underexposure ===
Underexposure, a docufiction produced by Majed Rasheed and Furat Al-Jamil and filmed by cinematographer Ziad Turkey on expired 35mm Kodak film stock, was met with global critical acclaim. Underexposure was the first movie to be filmed in Iraq after the fall of Saddam Hussein and the first Iraqi film in over a decade to not be censored by the Baath party. “Oday sees this as a critical time, in terms of reintroducing culture to their country. And he and his comrades are going at it with whatever they have.”

Filming was finished in April 2004 and Underexposure was released in June 2005 after post-production was completed in Berlin, Germany, with co-producers Tom Tykwer and Maria Köpf of X Filme Creative Pool.

Underexposure was shown in over 28 film festivals around the world, with the world premiere at International Film Festival Rotterdam (Netherlands 2005). Rasheed received numerous awards for his work on Underexposure, including Best Film in the Singapore International Film Festival in 2005.

In 2020, Underexposure was featured as part of the “Theatre of Operations – The Gulf War 1991-2011” Exhibit at the Museum of Modern Art.

=== Qarantina ===
According to the Los Angeles Times, Rasheed is “trying to find beauty in the darkness of Iraq” while filming his second feature, Qarantina (2010). Qarantina examines the realities of postwar Iraq through the unlikely interactions of a killer and a family that make their residence in an abandoned building. The assassin watches coldly as the family struggles with an abusive father and unmarried pregnant daughter. According to Rasheed, "Qarantina is my second visual expression of my impressions of my country – my hometown, Baghdad – and its reality since 2003. At least to me, it is a portrayal of inhumane and unnatural events in a society struggling with post-war trauma."

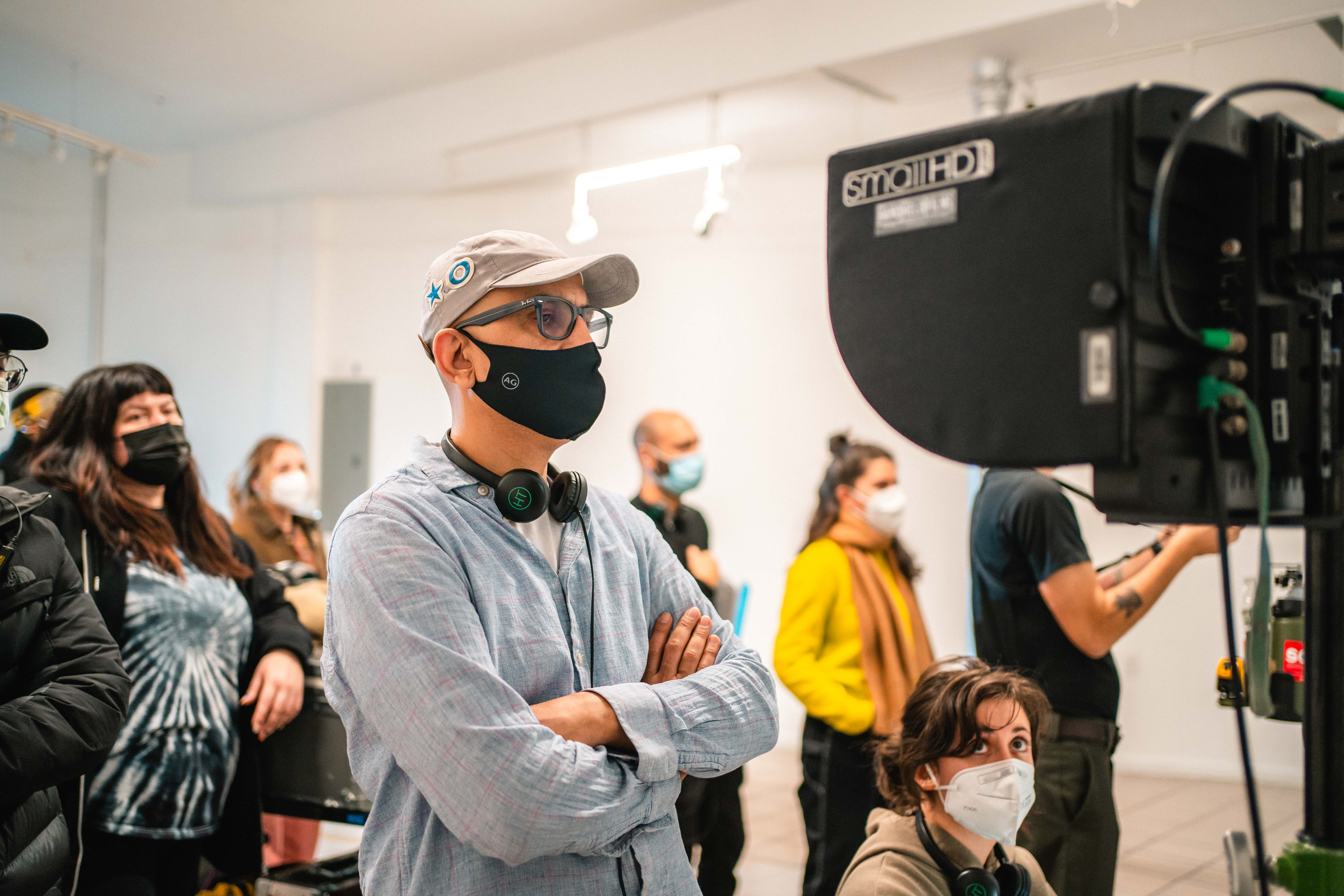
Oday Rasheed filming If You See Something, Brooklyn, December 2021 photographed by Yuuki Shimizu

The international release of Qarantina was at the International Film Festival Rotterdam (2011). The U.S. premiere was at the Museum of Modern Art, NY, part of ten films in The Global Lens 2012. It was also shown at Abu Dhabi Film Festival (2010), Seattle Film Festival (2011), Munich Film Festival (2011), Gulf Film Festival (2011). It won the Special Juries Prize at the Oran International Arabic Film Festival (2010).

=== If You See Something ===
In December 2021, Rasheed began filming his first English-language movie, If You See Something. The film follows an Iraqi immigrant seeking political asylum and an ambitious American woman, who start to build their life together in New York. When a crisis strikes, they are forced to navigate its impact on their relationship.

If You See Something is produced by Brian Newman, Frank Hall Green, Stephanie Roush & Emily McCann Lesser. The cast includes Jess Jacobs, Reed Birney, Adam Bakri, Lucy Owen, Krystina Alabado, Nasser Faris. If You See Something is in the final stages of post-production.

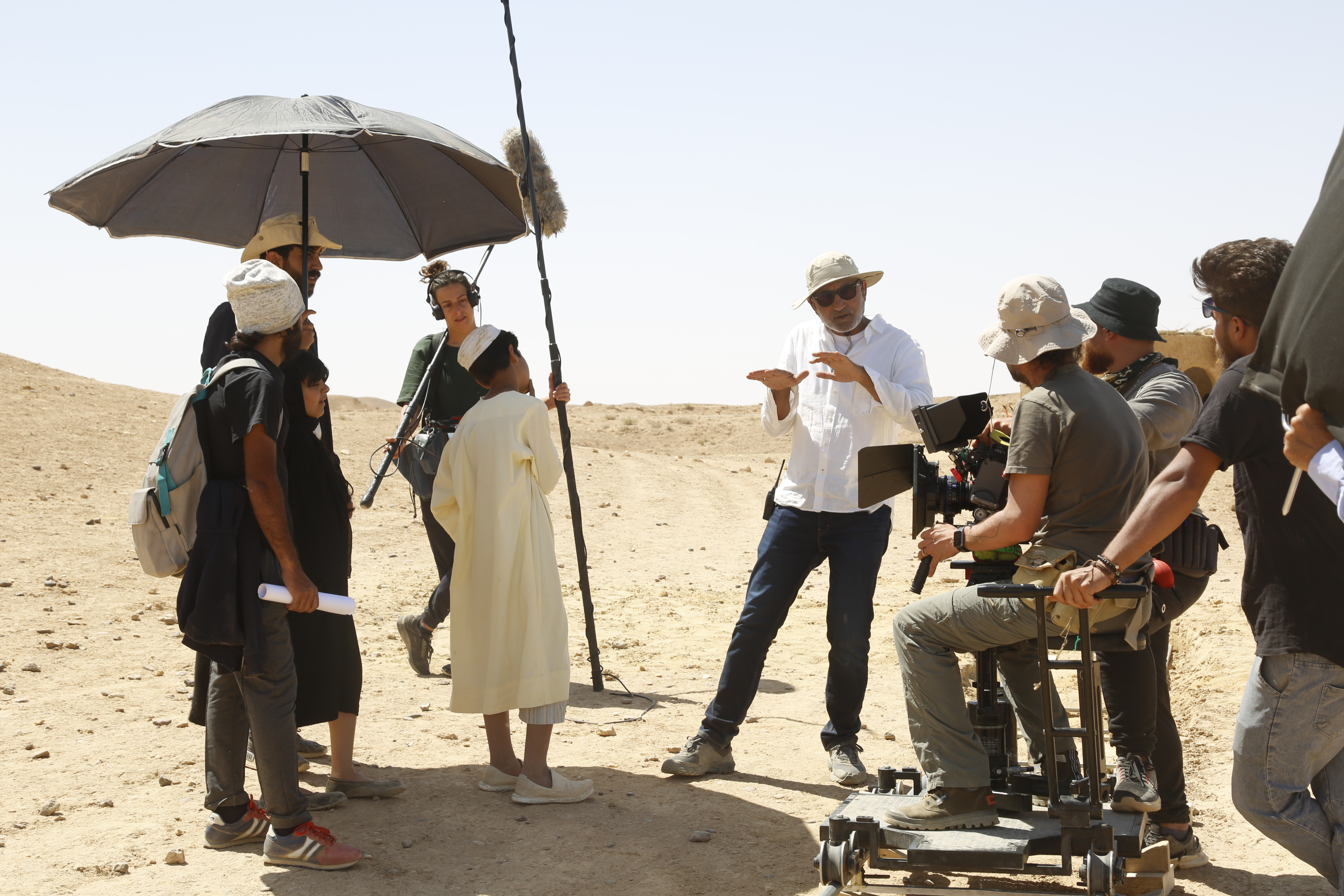
Oday Rasheed filming Songs of Adam in Iraq, April 2022, photographed by Mohammed Al-Saraf

=== Songs of Adam ===
Rasheed returned to Iraq to film Songs of Adam in the Anbar Province. It follows Adam, a 12 years old Iraqi farm boy, who tries to stop time in him, while continuing to observe its rowdy passage in the lives of others. It takes place in a remote village, on the banks of the Euphrates River in Western Mesopotamia over a period of 80 years.

The production of Songs of Adam began mid-March 2022 and concluded on May 26, 2022. It is produced by Majed Rasheed with KiAn Films and Ally Tubis, edited by editing supervisor, Hervé de Luze and editor, Muha Nad Rasheed. It had a MENA premier at the Red Sea International Film Festival 2024, winning the Yusr Best Screenplay Award.

== Themes ==
The main themes present in Oday Rasheed’s work are: surviving war mentally and emotionally, confronting the patriarchal society in Iraq, immigration, and the poetic aspect and limitless ability for the human being.

The Hollywood Reporter writes: "In Qarantina, his slow-moving, beautiful lensed second feature set in contemporary Baghdad, Iraqi director Oday Rasheed again describes life in the depressing, angst-ridden city where tanks, bombs and gunfire have become part of the urban landscape."

Ned Parker and Salar Jaff write for the Los Angeles Times: "The [main] character has been plucked from the wreckage of Baghdad’s eight years of occupation and civil war — conjured by writer and director Oday Rasheed in a haunting new film called Qarantina.... In Qarantina, a woman speaks in the dark to the hit man. He looks back at her, tired. Her words could be said by Rasheed, by those who watch his film, perhaps even by the hit man. They are the words of people who feel trapped by forces beyond their control, but who still dare to hope: I want to live. I want to work. I want a friend."

Naomi Wolf for Al Jazeera writes: "One of Iraq’s only working filmmakers, Oday Rasheed – whose brilliant film Underexposure (2005) followed a group of characters in Baghdad after the United States-led invasion in 2003… His embrace of the right to his truth, which is the artist’s task, is nonetheless remarkable, given that he is working in an environment in which part of the creative process involves trying to stay alive."

== Awards ==
- Yusr Best Screenplay Award, Red Sea International Film Festival (Songs of Adam)
- Special Jury Award, Oran International Film Festival, Algeria 2010 (Qarantina)
- Best Script, Oran International Film Festival, Algeria 2006 (Underexposure)
- Golden Hawk (Best Feature Film), 5th Arab Film Festival, The Netherlands, 2005 (Underexposure)
- Best Film Award, 18th Singapore International Film Festival 2005 (Underexposure)
