= Najeen =

Najeen is a loose collective of Iraqi actors, artists and filmmakers that formed in 1991 in the wake of the Persian Gulf War. Before the Iraq War began in 2003, the group produced their projects mostly underground to avoid coming under the eye of the Baath Party's Ministry of Culture, whose approval was necessary for public works of art. After the American invasion of Iraq and the fall of the Baath Party, Najeen produced a short series of highly visible art projects.

== Postwar works ==
=== They Passed By Here ===
"They Passed By Here", a play written, directed and performed by members of Najeen debuted nn Sunday, May 4, 2003, at 3:00 pm. It was directed by Basim Al-Hajar and took place the Al Rasheed theater, which was Iraq's most famous playhouse and was largely destroyed in the American bombing campaign in March and April 2003.

=== Sculpture in Fardus Square ===
On May 29, 2003, Najeen unveiled an untitled sculpture in the center of Fardus Square, which is where the famous sculpture of Saddam was toppled by a mix of American troops and Iraqi citizens. The sculpture's construction was led by Basim Hamad and took place over the course of several weeks on location over several weeks in May.

=== Underexposure ===
Led by director Oday Rasheed, members of Najeen produced Underexposure the first film shot in postwar Baghdad.
