= If You See Something =

2024 American drama film

- Directed by: Oday Rasheed
- Written by: Avram Noble Ludwig; Jess Jacobs
- Produced by: Jess Jacobs; Stephanie Roush; Brian Newman; Frank Hall Green; Caitlin Zvoleff; Andre Basso; Joseph Stephans
- Starring: Adam Bakri; Jess Jacobs; Tarek Bishara; Lucy Owen; Hadi Tabbal; Krystina Alabado; Hend Ayoub; Reggie Gowland; Nasser Farris; Reed Birney
- Cinematography: Daniel Vecchione
- Edited by: Soojin Chung
- Music by: Bryan Keller
- Production companies: Greenmachine Film; 9th Street Films
- Distributed by: Joint Venture
- Release dates: October 16, 2024 (Woodstock); October 31, 2025 (United States)
- Running time: 97 minutes
- Country: United States
- Languages: English; Arabic

If You See Something is a 2024 American drama film directed by Oday Rasheed, from a screenplay by Avram Noble Ludwig and Jess Jacobs. It stars Adam Bakri, Jess Jacobs, Tarek Bishara, Lucy Owen, Hadi Tabbal, Krystina Alabado, Hend Ayoub, Reggie Gowland, Nasser Farris and Reed Birney. Doug Liman serves as an executive producer.

It had its world premiere at the Woodstock Film Festival on October 16, 2024, and is scheduled to be released on October 31, 2025, by Joint Venture.

== Premise ==
Explores the romance between an American woman and Iraqi doctor who seeks political asylum in the United States, and how both their relationship and asylum are threatened when a crisis strikes in Baghdad.

== Cast ==
- Adam Bakri as Ali
- Jess Jacobs as Katie
- Tarek Bishara as Raad
- Lucy Owen as Margot
- Hadi Tabbal as Dawod
- Krystina Alabado as Lena
- Hend Ayoub as Maya
- Reggie Gowland as Charlie
- Nasser Faris as Omar
- Reed Birney as Ward

== Production ==
Doug Liman serves as an executive producer.

== Release ==
It had its world premiere at the Woodstock Film Festival on October 16, 2024. In June 2025, Joint Venture acquired distribution rights to the film.
