= Basam Ridha =

Advisor to Iraqi PM Nouri Maliki

Basam Ridha Al-Husaini (Arabic: بسام رضا الحسيني) (born in Iraq c. 1964) is an advisor to Iraqi Prime Minister Nouri Maliki charged with overseeing judicial matters. He also was an advisor to his predecessor, Prime Minister Ibrahim al-Jaafari. Prior to returning to Iraq, he worked in the United States as an engineer and actor, appearing in small roles.

His family were Shiites who refused to join Saddam Hussein's Baath Party, and as a result his older brothers Bashir and Kadhim were arrested. Their fates were unknown until after the fall of Hussein's regime; his family found records of their execution. Ridha fled to the US in 1982, bribing officials for a passport and dropping his last name. He graduated with a BA in mechanical engineering in 1987 from Louisiana State University. After moving to Los Angeles, he worked as a state engineer and then started a home inspection business.

Following the fall of Saddam Hussein, Ridha returned to work for the new Iraqi government. In charge of overseeing executions, he was on vacation in Dubai and was not present for the Execution of Saddam Hussein, since the US handed him over earlier than expected.
