= 2:30 min =

- Directed by: Hayder Faris
- Written by: Hayder Faris
- Produced by: Iraqi Canadian Society of Ontario
- Starring: Jabbar Al Janabi, Maytham Salih, Mariam Al Ani, Farouk Sabri
- Cinematography: Tariq Al Juboori
- Release date: September 2016
- Running time: 8 minutes
- Country: Iraq
- Languages: Arabic, English

2:30 min is an Iraqi experimental film by Iraqi film director Hayder Faris. The film won "Best Experimental Film" award at Canada Independent Film Festival, which was held on 26 January 2018 in Montreal, Canada.

The 8 minutes film written and directed by Hayder Faris and produced by the Iraqi Canadian Society of Ontario is about the last two-and-a-half minutes of the victims' life of the 2016 Karrada bombing in Baghdad, which occurred on 3 July 2016. The cast included Jabbar Al Janabi, Maytham Salih, Mariam Al Ani, Farouk Sabri, as well as other Iraqi performers and personnel living in Canada. The film uses colour and slow motion scenes, and close shoot-ups to display fear and panic features in those final minutes. The film was shot in Scarborough a district of Toronto, that has a big population of Arab descent, as the director tries to create an environment that has the most resemblance to the streets and storefronts of Al-Karrada area in Baghdad.
