= Krystina Alabado =

American actress and singer

- Alabado in 2026
- Born: Krystina Helena Alabado; August 7, 1989 (age 37); Phoenix, Arizona, U.S.
- Education: Arizona State University
- Occupations: Actress, singer
- Years active: 2009–present
- Spouse: Robert Lenzi (m. 2017)
- Website: krystinaalabado.com

Krystina Helena Alabado (born August 7, 1989) is an American actress and singer. She is known for her acting on Broadway. Alabado made her broadway debut February 28, 2011 playing a replacement ensemble role in American Idiot. She originated the role of Vanden in the 2016 Broadway production of American Psycho and starred as Gretchen Wieners in Mean Girls on Broadway from March 2019 until the show's final performance on March 11, 2020. Since 2024, she has voiced Cherri Bomb in the adult animated musical series Hazbin Hotel.

== Early life ==
Alabado attended Hamilton High School in Chandler, Arizona, and studied musical theatre for one year at Arizona State University. Alabado's parents are immigrants from Mexico and Lebanon.

== Career ==
At the age of 18, Alabado joined the national tour of Spring Awakening as part of the ensemble. She moved to New York City in 2009, and made her Broadway debut in 2011 as a replacement ensemble member and understudy in American Idiot, later reprising her role in the show's first national tour. In 2013, she joined the national tour of Evita (based on the 2012 Broadway revival) playing Juan Perón's mistress. In 2016, she appeared in the short-lived Broadway production of American Psycho. Alabado performed in the ensemble and as the minor character Vanden, a nightclub singer. She also understudied the principal role of Jean.

In March 2019, Alabado joined the cast of Mean Girls as Gretchen Wieners, replacing Ashley Park, who originated the role. In an interview in October 2019, she revealed that she had previously auditioned for the show while it was still in development, but did not get cast.

In November 2019, Alabado, along with Evita Tour co-star Desi Oakley, founded Pop Rock Broadway, a Broadway training program for young actors in NYC expanding into the world of Pop, Rock, and Contemporary Musical Theatre.

In March 2020, Alabado started a YouTube channel to explain to her followers different aspects of how Broadway works and interview her fellow castmates during the COVID-19 pandemic that temporarily closed Broadway. After the pandemic ended, Krystina continued to upload similar videos about her experience as an actor. In 2024, she began making videos to display fanart she received during conventions.

In 2024, Alabado voiced Cherri Bomb in Hazbin Hotel. According to costar Amir Talai, the lines were recorded sometime in 2021. According to creator of the show, Vivienne Medrano, Alabado sang “Bad Reputation” by Joan Jett & the Blackhearts for her audition. Alabado is best known for this role and regularly attends conventions. In 2026, she, along with Alex Brightman, performed a song "Nobody's Bay Bay" for the sister show of the same creator, Helluva Boss, as the first released song for the season 3 released September 16th.

== Theatre credits ==
Year	Title	Role	Theatre	Director(s)	Ref.
2009	Spring Awakening	Ensemble (u/s Wendla/Ilse)	U.S. National Tour	Michael Mayer	
2011	Camp Wanatachi	Titi O’Malley	La MaMa Experimental Theatre Club	Matt Cowart	
2011	**American Idiot**	**Ensemble (Whatsername/The Extraordinary Girl, u/s)** (replacement)	**St. James Theatre**	Michael Mayer	
2011–12	American Idiot	Ensemble	North American Tour	Michael Mayer	
2012	Pregnancy Pact	Sansanee	Weston Playhouse Theatre Company	Joe Calarco	
2013–14	Evita	Mistress	U.S. National Tour	Michael Grandage	
2015–16	Lazarus	Teenage Girl #1	New York Theatre Workshop	Ivo van Hove	
2016	**American Psycho**	**Vanden/Club Singer/Ensemble (Jean u/s)**	**Gerald Schoenfeld Theatre**	Rupert Goold	
2016	Miss You Like Hell	Olivia	La Jolla Playhouse	Lear deBessonet	Source
2017	The Mad Ones	Samantha Brown	59E59 Theaters	Stephen Brackett	
2018	This Ain't No Disco	Meesh	Atlantic Theater Company	Darko Tresnjak	
2019–2020	**Mean Girls**	**Gretchen Wieners** (replacement)	**August Wilson Theatre**	Casey Nicholaw	
2020	A Killer Party	Lily Wright		Marc Bruni (playwright by Kait Kerrigan)	
2021	Goosebumps the Musical: Phantom of the Auditorium	Brooke Rodgers	Original Studio Cast Recording	Danny Abosch and John Maclay	N/A
2021	Mystic Pizza	Daisy Arujo	Ogunquit Playhouse	Casey Hushion	
2023	Sunday in the Park with George	Dot/Marie	Pasadena Playhouse	Sarna Lapine	
2025	Regency Girls	Dabney	Old Globe Theatre	Josh Rhodes	

• Credits in bold indicate Broadway production(s)

== Filmography ==
=== Film ===
Year	Title	Role	Notes	Ref.
2017	First Reformed	Choir Member		
2022	Better Nate Than Ever	Assistant Casting Director		
2024	Mikey’s Army	Autumn Jones	Short film	
2024	If You See Something	Lena		
2025	Snow White	Good Queen	Singing voice	

=== Television ===
Year	Title	Role	Notes	Ref.
2015	Tyrant	Jill	Episode: "A Viper in the Palace"	
2018	Voltron: Legendary Defender	Veronica (voice)	Recurring role (seasons 7–8), 13 episodes	
2019	God Friended Me	Olivia	Episode: "Miracle on 123rd Street"	
2022	Sesame Street: Mecha Builders	Billie, Barta (voice)	2 episodes	
2022–2023	Pantheon	Hannah (voice)	Recurring role (season 1)	
2023	Monster High	Nefera De Nile (voice)	Recurring role	
2024–present	Hazbin Hotel	Cherri Bomb, additional voices	8 episodes	
2026	The Walking Dead: Dead City	Yvette DeLeon	4 episodes	
2026	Helluva Boss	Song vocalist	Episode: "Return to Loo Loo Land"	

== Awards and nominations ==
Year	Award	Category	Nominated work	Result	Ref.
2019	Broadway.com Audience Awards	Favorite Replacement - Female	Mean Girls	Nominated	
