= Maysoon Pachachi =

Maysoon Pachachi (born 17 September 1947) is a film director, editor and producer of Iraqi origin. She was educated in Iraq, the U.S., Britain and can speak English, Arabic, French and Italian. She studied Philosophy at University College London (BA Hons) and Film under Thorold Dickinson at the Slade School of Art, where visiting lecturers included Jean Renoir and Gillo Pontecorvo. She has made documentaries in Iraq, Iran, Palestine, Egypt, Syria and Lebanon. Aside from making films, Maysoon has also taught film directing and editing in Britain, Iraq and Palestine (in Jerusalem, Gaza and at Birzeit University). She now lives in Britain where she co-founded Act Together: Women Against Sanctions and War on Iraq, a group of UK-based Iraqi and non-Iraqi women formed in 2000 to campaign against the economic sanctions on Iraq. They also campaigned against the invasion of Iraq. Now the group's focus is on the occupation and the support of independent grassroots women's initiatives in Iraq. She has also written articles on her work in Iraq and Palestine for the New Statesman and The Guardian among other publications.

Following the start of the Iraq War in 2004, she co-founded with her colleague, Kasim Abid, also a London-based Iraqi filmmaker, the Independent Film & Television College, a non-governmental free-of-charge film-training centre in Baghdad. Eight films produced by the college's students won prizes at Arab and international festivals. She currently serves as the chair on the board of trustees for the Shubbak festival of contemporary Arab culture.

She is the daughter of Iraqi politician Adnan Pachachi.

== Filmography ==
- Voices from Gaza (1989)
- Iraqi Women: Voices from Exile (1994)
- Iranian Journey (2000)
- Living with the Past: People and Monuments in Medieval Cairo (2001)
- Bitter Water (2003)
- Return to the Land of Wonders (2004)
- Life After the Fall (2008)
- Our Feelings took the Pictures: Open Shutters Iraq (2008)

Also worked on television series "Minder" (1980s)
