= Underexposure (film) =

- Directed by: Oday Rasheed
- Written by: Oday Rasheed; Faris Harram
- Cinematography: Ziad Turkey
- Release date: 4 August 2005
- Running time: 74 minutes
- Country: Iraq
- Language: Arabic

Underexposure is a 2005 Iraqi film, in the docufiction style, written and directed by Oday Rasheed, produced by Enlil Film and Arts. The story follows a fictional Iraqi film crew, inspired by the actual crew, that struggles with making a film during the 2003 invasion of Iraq and subsequent American occupation. It was the first feature film to be shot in Iraq after the beginning of the Iraq War.

== Plot summary ==
The title Underexposure is not only a reference to the expired film stock on which the movie was filmed, but a commentary on the lives of a generation of Iraqis who grew up during the Iraq embargo, isolated from the world. In Underexposure, a fictional film crew copes with the frustration and fear of the Iraq War in Baghdad by making a movie. Friends, lovers, strangers, and family members are woven together by the complexities of their new reality. Along the way friends die and they encounter resistance from people who do not want to be filmed. Ultimately the burgeoning efforts to make the best of their gruesome reality end in tragedy.

== Production ==
Underexposure was shot on expired Kodak film that was bought back from looters in the early days of the American occupation. Underexposure was produced by Enlil Film and Arts, with Producer and Production Designer Majed Rasheed and Executive Producer Furat Al Jamil. Filming began in November 2003 with money that the crew raised by selling their own possessions. Underexposure was the first movie to be filmed in Iraq after the fall of Saddam Hussein and the first Iraqi film in over a decade to not be censored by the Ba'ath party. Filming was finished in April 2004 and the film was released in June 2005 after post-production was completed in Berlin, Germany, with co-producers Tom Tykwer and Maria Köpf of X Filme Creative Pool.

== Cast ==
- Samar Qahtan as Hassan, director
- Myriam Abbas as Maysoon, Hassan's wife (also: Meriam Abbas)
- Hussein Abdul-Kareem as Boy
- Yousef al-Any as Abu Shaker (also: Yousif Al-Ani)
- Basim Hajar as Mataz
- Basim Hamad as Soldier
- Hayder Helo as Nasser
- Majed Rasheed as Ziyad
- Muhanad Rasheed as Sound technician
- Awatif Salman as Futha

== Crew ==
- Oday Rasheed Director / Scriptwriter
- Majed Rasheed Producer / Production Designer
- Furat Al Jamil Executive Producer
- Gabriel Yared Original soundtrack composition
- Ziad Turkey Director of Photography / Director / Photographer
- Hayder Helo Scriptwriter / Assistant Director / Theatrical Director / Actor
- Murad Atshan Assistant Director / Scriptwriter
- Faris Harram Scriptwriter / Poet
- Osama Rasheed Assistant Director / Graphics Designer
- Fady Fadhil Assistant Cameraman / Graphics Designer
- Muhanad Rasheed Assistant Cameraman / Graphics Designer / Theatrical Dancer
- Dhurgham Abdul-Wahid Art Director Luay Fadhil Assistant Art Director
- Adel Khalid Production Assistant
- Hussein Atshan Production Assistant
- Salam Al-Sukeiny Press Officer
- Yasar Qadir Assistant Press Officer
- Iman Qasim Sound Engineer
- Basim Fahim Camera Mover
- Ammar Al-Asmar Assistant Sound Engineer
- Abbas Al-Dayekh Assistant Camera Mover

== Critical reception ==
Underexposure was shown in film festivals around the world, including The Rotterdam International Film Festival (Netherlands 2005, World Premiere), the Febio Festival (Czech Republic 2005), Arab Film Festival Japan (2005), Singapore International Film Festival (2005), Arab Film Festival (Netherlands 2005), Durban International Film Festival (South Africa 2005), Munich Film Festival (Germany 2005), Osians Cinefan Asian Film Festival (India 2005), Alexandria International Film Festival (Egypt 2005), La Mostra de Valencia (Spain 2005). Additionally, Oday Rasheed received numerous awards for his work on Underexposure.

Awards:

- Best Film Award, 18th Singapore International Film Festival 2005 (Underexposure)
- Golden Hawk (Best Feature Film), 5th Arab Film Festival, The Netherlands, 2005 (Underexposure)
- Best Script, Wahran International Film Festival, Algeria 2007 (Underexposure)

== See also ==
- Docufiction
- List of docufiction films
