= Amer Alwan =

Iraqi French film director and actor (1957–2023)

- Born: 1 July 1957; Iraq
- Died: 4 July 2023 (aged 66); Eaubonne, France
- Burial place: Saint-Ouen Cemetery, Paris, France
- Occupations: Film director, actor

Amer Alwan (1 July 1957 – 4 July 2023) was an Iraqi French film director and actor.

== Filming his movie Zaman, the Man From the Reeds ==
Alwan was forced to shoot his movie Zaman, the Man From the Reeds on videotape. Since Iraq was under severe economic sanctions, the United Nations and United States would not allow Iraq to import 35 and 16 millimeter film stocks, because they believed that the materials contained some chemicals that could have been used to produce weapons of mass destruction. So, he then transferred it to 35-millimeter film when he went back to Paris, where he lived since 1980. He also had issues dealing with the Iraqi government censors. The film was shown at several film festivals in Europe and Latin America, as well as the United States.

== Death ==
Alwan died after battling cancer in Eaubonne, France, on 4 July 2023, at the age of 66.

== Filmography ==
- 2003 – Zaman, the Man From the Reeds (Zaman, l'homme des roseaux)

== Awards ==
- San Sebastián International Film Festival Future Talent Award for Zaman, the Man From the Reeds
