= Iraqi National Theatre =

Theater in Iraq

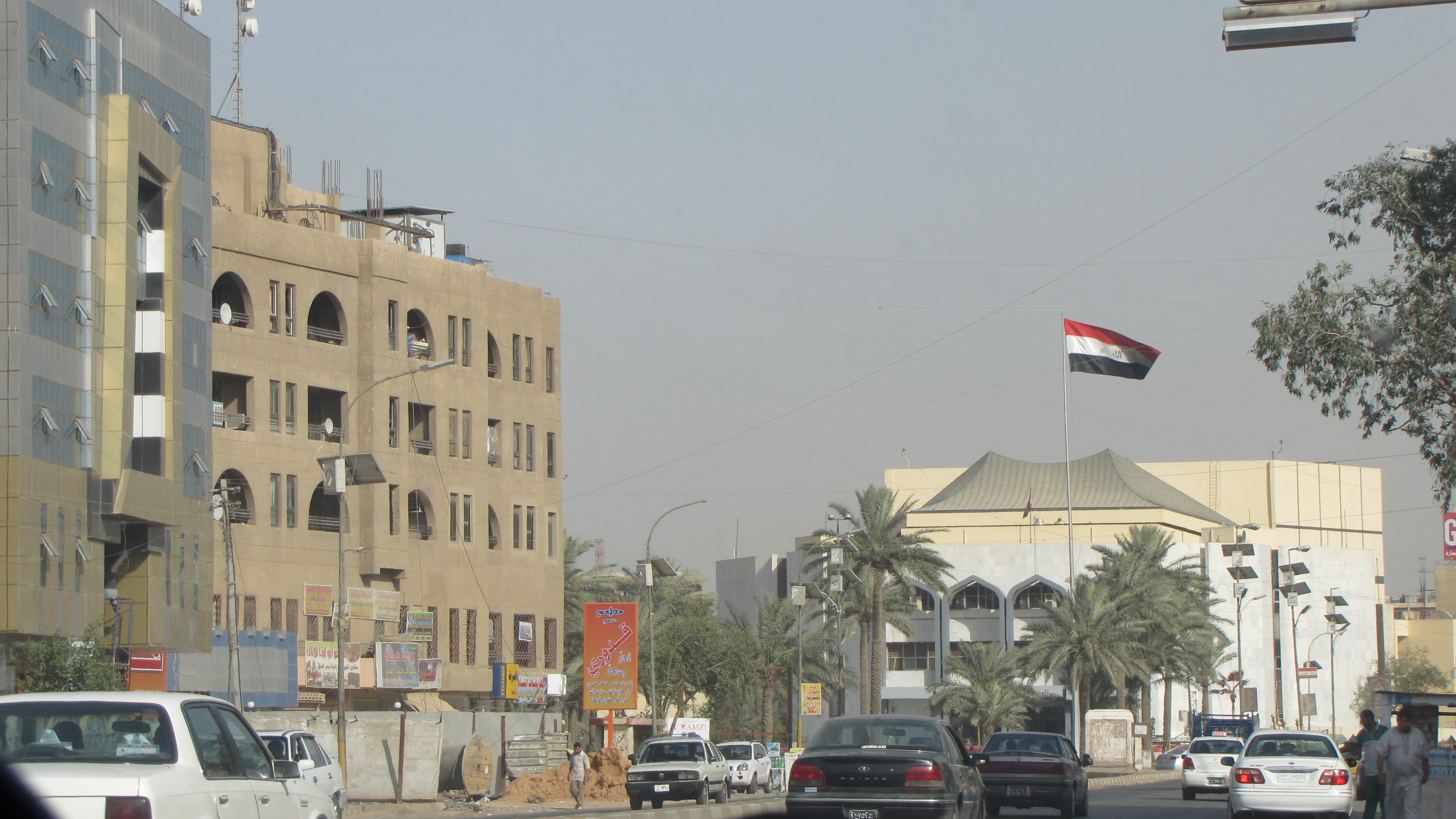
- Interactive map of Iraqi National Theatre
- Location: Baghdad, Iraq
- Coordinates: 33°18′13″N 44°25′56″E
- Capacity: 1000

Construction
- Built: 1980s

The National Theatre in Iraq was opened during the Saddam Hussein era and closed during the 2003 Iraq War. According to the Telegraph, the theatre re-opened in 2009 with reinforced blast walls to protect against terrorist attacks. According to Al Arabiya News, the theatre has 1000 seats and cost 10,000 Iraqi Dinars to attend.
