= African, Asian and Latin American Film Festival =

Annual film festival in Milan, Italy

- Location: Milan
- Founded: 1991
- Artistic director: Annamaria Gallone; Alessandra Speciale
- Website: www.fescaaal.org

African, Asian and Latin American Film Festival (Italian: Festival del Cinema Africano, d’Asia e America Latina, FESCAAAL) is an annual film festival in Milan, Italy.

== Profile ==
The festival was organized by the Centro Orientamento Educativo (COE) Association as a cultural event aimed to promote cinema and cultures of countries in Africa, Asia and Latin America.

The line-up of the very first 1991 edition featured a retrospective on Senegalese cinema and a section on children's rights.

The festival takes place in Milan every spring at different venues around the city. Apart from screenings, FESCAAL hosts various cultural events and round tables, such as Africa Talks, dedicated to environmental discussions.

The MiWorld Youth Film Festival (MiWY) was established in 2020. As part of FESCAAL, MiWY targets schoolchildren and promotes cross-cultural and cinematic discovery.

== Sections ==
- Lungometraggi Finestre sul Mondo competition (Feature-Length Window Into the World);
- Cortometraggi Africani competition (African Shorts);
- Extra competition for films made by Italian directors;
- E tutti ridono (Everyone Smiles);
- Fuori Concorso (Out of competition);
- Flash section includes all other films in the line-up.
