= Culture of Iraq =

The culture of Iraq (Arabic: ثقافة العراق) or the culture of Mesopotamia is one of the world's oldest cultural histories and is considered one of the most influential cultures in the world. The region between the Tigris and Euphrates rivers, historically known as Mesopotamia, is often referred to as the cradle of civilisation. Mesopotamian legacy went on to influence and shape the civilizations of the Old World in different ways such as inventing writing, mathematics, law, astrology and many more fields. Iraq is home to diverse ethnic groups who have contributed to the wide spectrum of Iraqi culture. The country is known for its poets, architects, painters and sculptors who are among the best in the region, some of them being world-class. The country has one of the longest written traditions in the world including architecture, literature, music, dance, painting, weaving, pottery, calligraphy, stonemasonry, and metalworking.

Additionally, Iraq embraces and celebrates the achievements of both its pre-Islamic past, as well as in Islamic times during the Islamic Golden Age when Baghdad was the capital of the Abbasid Caliphate.

== Languages ==
The main languages spoken in Iraq are Mesopotamian Arabic and Kurdish, followed by the Iraqi Turkmen/Turkoman dialect of Turkish, and the Neo-Aramaic languages (specifically Sureth). Arabic and Kurdish are written with versions of the Arabic script. Since 2005, the Turkmen/Turkoman have switched from the Arabic script to the Turkish alphabet.

In addition, the Neo-Aramaic languages use the Syriac script. Other smaller minority languages include Mandaic, English, Shabaki and Armenian.

According to the Constitution of Iraq (Article 4):

The Arabic language and the Kurdish language are the two official languages of Iraq. The right of Iraqis to educate their children in their mother tongue, such as Turkmen, Syriac, and Armenian shall be guaranteed in government educational institutions in accordance with educational guidelines, or in any other language in private educational institutions.

=== Ancient ===
Sumerian (𒅴𒂠 EME.G̃IR_{15} "native tongue") was the language of ancient Sumer and a language isolate that was spoken in Mesopotamia. The Sumerian language is the earliest known written language. The "proto-literate" period of Sumerian writing spans c. 3300 to 3000 BC. In this period, records are purely logographic, with phonological content. The oldest document of the proto-literate period is the Kish tablet. Falkenstein (1936) lists 939 signs used in the proto-literate period (late Uruk, 34th to 31st centuries). During the 3rd millennium BC, an intimate cultural symbiosis developed between the Sumerians and the Semitic-speaking Akkadians, which included widespread bilingualism. The influence of Sumerian and the East Semitic language Akkadian on each other is evident in all areas, from lexical borrowing on a substantial scale to syntactic, morphological, and phonological convergence. This has prompted scholars to refer to Sumerian and Akkadian in the third millennium BC as a Sprachbund.

== Art ==
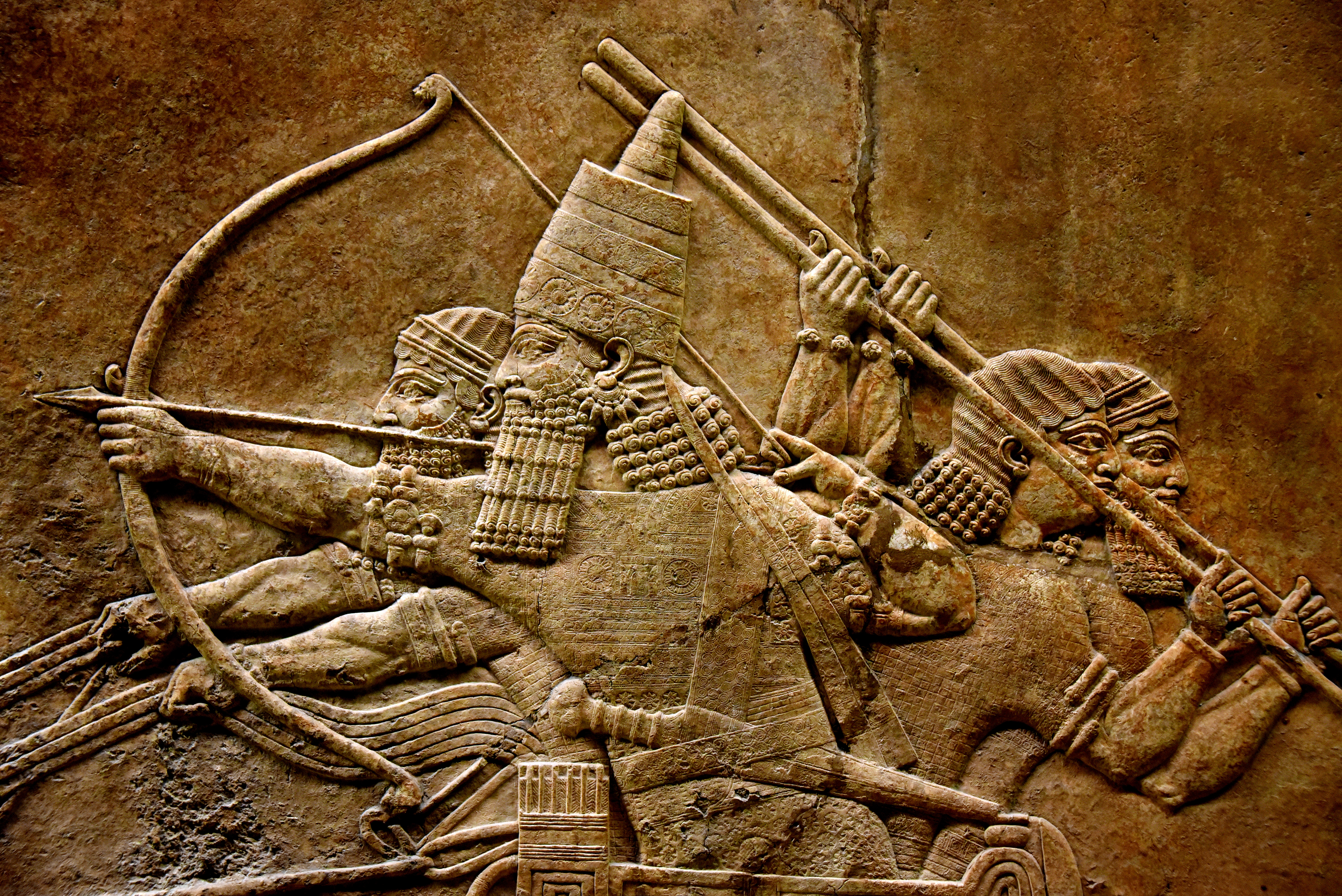
7th-century BC relief depicting Ashurbanipal (r. 669–631 BC) and three royal attendants in a chariot

Iraqi art typically refers to artworks produced in the geographical region of the modern Iraqi territory and includes some works produced in ancient Mesopotamia. Most surviving works from this time are made from durable materials, including stone cylinder seals, moulded pottery, and small figurines. Frequent subjects of ancient Mesopotamian art included deities (sometimes shown with worshipers) and animals portrayed in detailed scenes. Of the few paintings that have survived, most appear to suggest that painting was reserved for sculptures and geometric or plant-based decorative motifs.

During the Abbasid period, pottery became highly sophisticated. Additionally, calligraphy began to be used to decorate the surfaces of objects and illuminated manuscripts, with Quranic texts in particular becoming more complex and stylised. The first Islamic art school was established in the 12th century, allowing artisans and crafts guilds to flourish. From the late 12th century, Islamic art was influenced by a stylistic movement commonly known as the Baghdad School. Yahya Al-Wasiti, who lived in Baghdad at this time, is a famous painter and calligrapher regarded as a preeminent artist of the Baghdad School. His most well-known works include the illustrations for the book of the Maqamat (Assemblies) in 1237, a series of anecdotes of social satire written by al-Hariri.

== Literature ==
=== Pre-Islamic ===
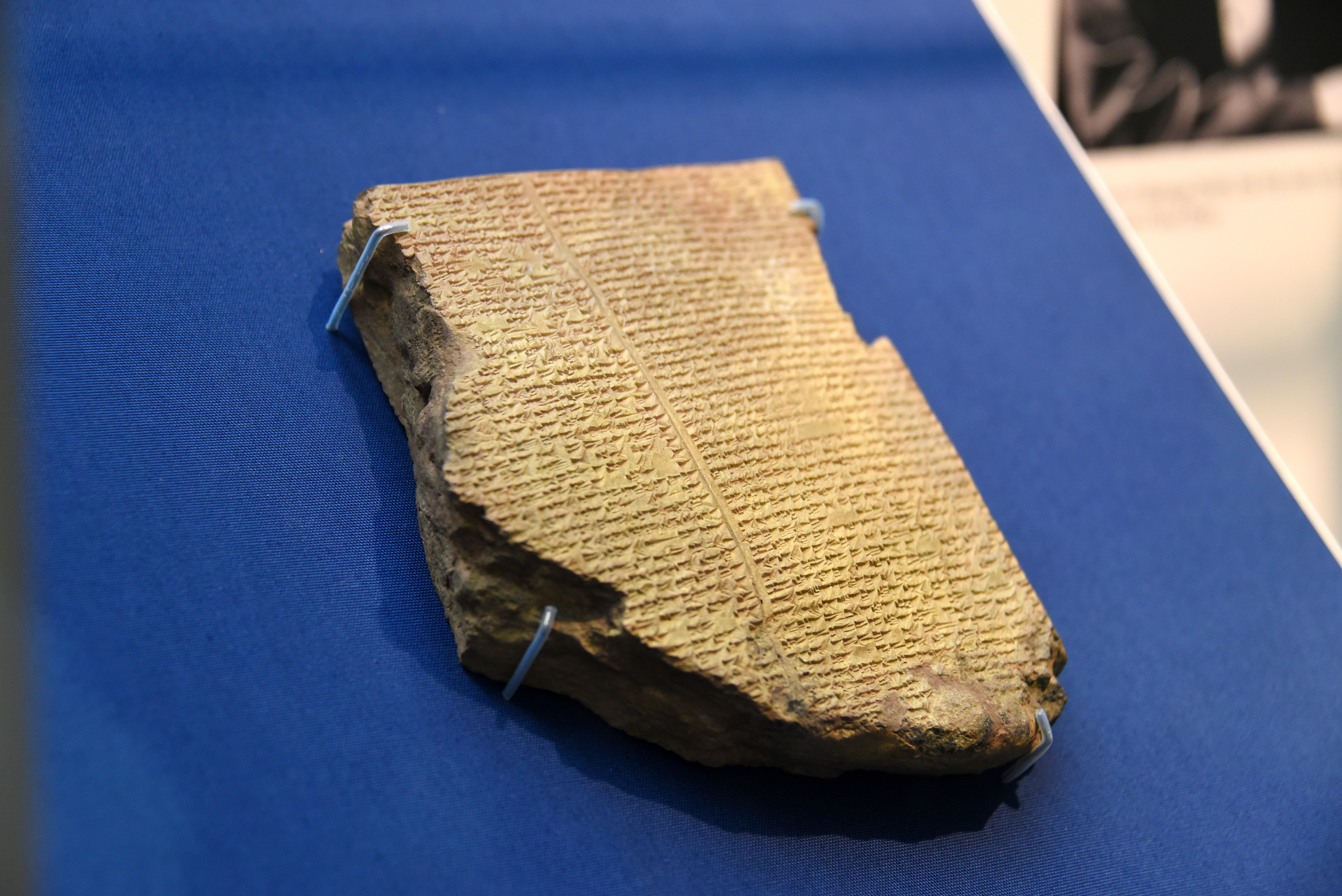
Flood Tablet of the Epic of Gilgamesh

Sumerian literature constitutes the earliest known corpus of recorded literature, including the religious writings and other traditional stories maintained by the Sumerian civilization and largely preserved by the later Akkadian and Babylonian empires. These records were written in the Sumerian language during the Middle Bronze Age.

The Sumerians invented one of the first writing systems, developing Sumerian cuneiform writing out of earlier proto-writing systems by about the 30th century BC. The Sumerian language remained in official and literary use in the Akkadian and Babylonian empires, even after the spoken language disappeared from the population; literacy was widespread, and the Sumerian texts that students copied heavily influenced later Babylonian literature.

==== Poetry ====
Poetry is the most dominant form of literature in Iraq and the country is known for having notable poets.

An ancient Mesopotamian poem gives the first known story of the invention of writing:

Because the messenger's mouth was heavy and he couldn't repeat [the message], the Lord of Kulaba patted some clay and put words on it, like a tablet. Until then, there had been no putting words on clay.

— Sumerian epic poem Enmerkar and the Lord of Aratta. Circa 1800 BC

Gilgamesh (Sumerian: 𒀭𒄑𒉋𒂵𒈨𒌋𒌋𒌋, romanized: Gilgameš; originally Sumerian: 𒀭𒉋𒂵𒈩, romanized: Bilgamesh) was a major hero in ancient Mesopotamian mythology and the protagonist of the Epic of Gilgamesh.

The Epic of Gilgamesh (/ˈɡɪlɡəmɛʃ/) is an epic poem from ancient Mesopotamia, regarded as the earliest surviving notable literature. The literary history of Gilgamesh begins with five Sumerian poems about Bilgamesh (Sumerian for "Gilgamesh"), king of Uruk, dating from the Third Dynasty of Ur (c. 2100 BCE). These independent stories were later used as source material for a combined epic in Akkadian. The first surviving version of this combined epic, known as the "Old Babylonian" version dates to the 18th century BCE and is titled after its incipit, Shūtur eli sharrī ("Surpassing All Other Kings"). Only a few tablets have survived. The later Standard Babylonian version compiled by Sîn-lēqi-unninni dates from the 13th to the 10th centuries BCE and bears the incipit Sha naqba īmuru("He who Saw the Abyss", in modern terms: "He who Sees the Unknown"). Approximately two-thirds of this longer, twelve-tablet version have been recovered. Some of the best copies were discovered in the library ruins of the 7th-century BC Assyrian king Ashurbanipal.

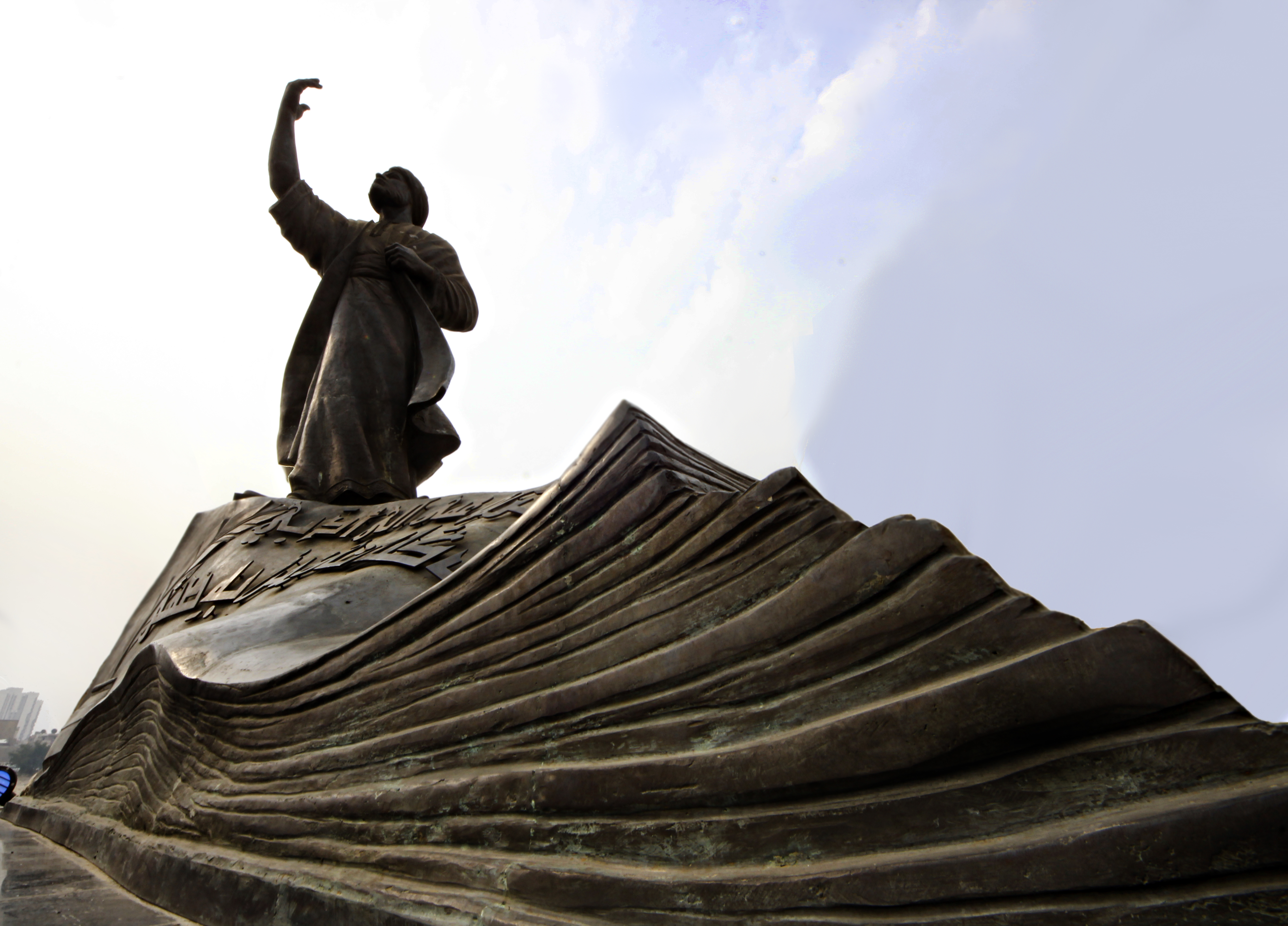
Al-Mutanabi, regarded as one of the greatest, most prominent and influential poets in the Arabic language; much of his work has been translated into over 20 languages worldwide.

=== Post-Islamic ===
During the Abbasid Caliphate, the well established tradition of poetry continued to be the most dominant form of literature. In addition, Abbasid literature was characterized by the emergence of many new genres and of a scholarly and sophisticated critical consciousness.

Baghdad evolved into a significant cultural, commercial, and intellectual center of the Muslim world. This, in addition to housing several key academic institutions, including the House of Wisdom, as well as hosting a multiethnic and multireligious environment, garnered the city a worldwide reputation as the "Centre of Learning".

=== Contemporary ===
Some of the most important figures of 20th century Iraqi literature include Safa Khulusi, Maruf Rusafi, Daisy Al-Amir, Jamil Zahawi, Jawahiri, and Khazal al Majidi.

== Architecture ==
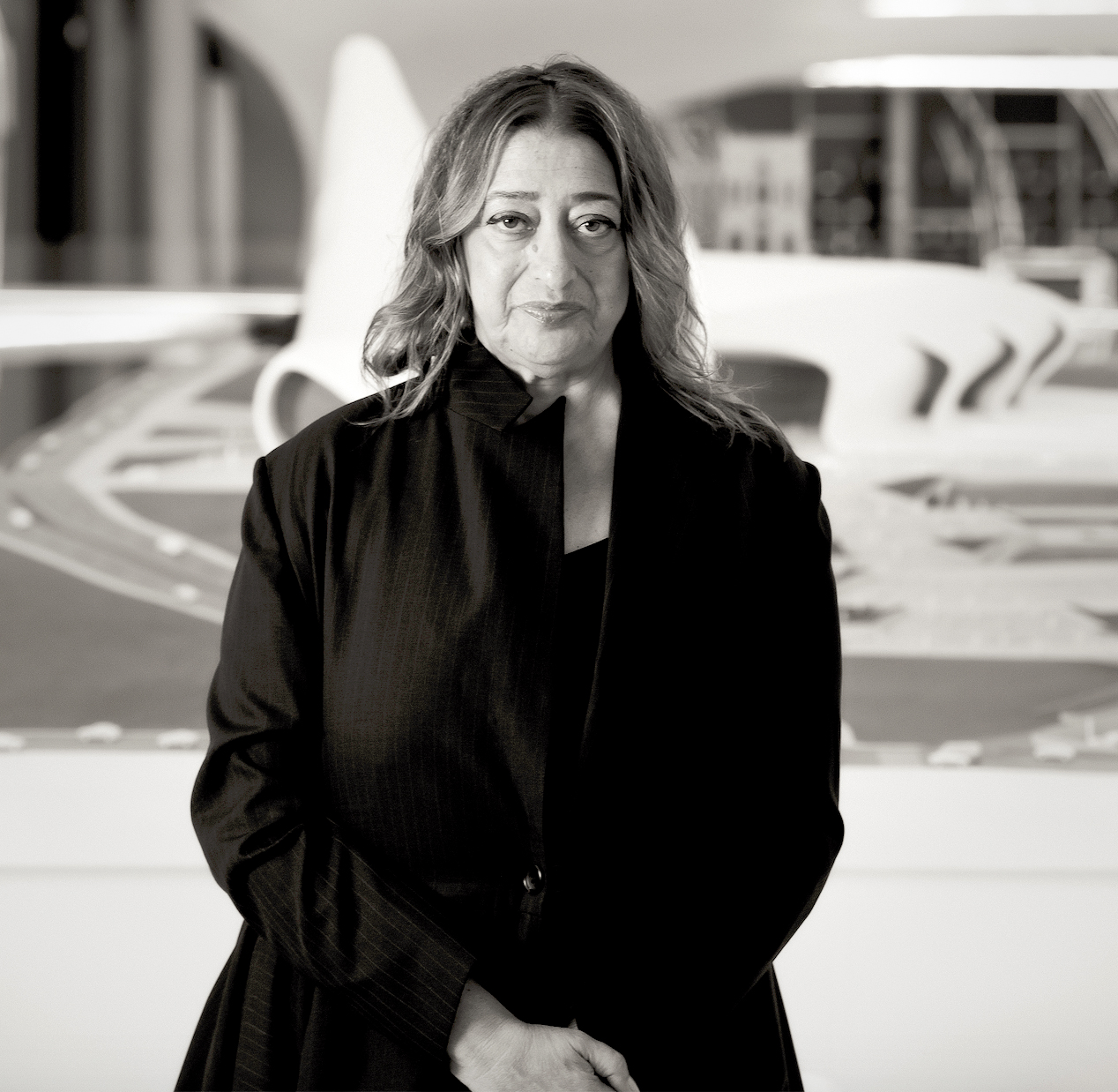
Zaha Hadid was an Iraqi architect, artist and designer, recognised as a major figure in architecture of the late 20th and early 21st centuries. She is known for being influenced by Sumerian ancient cities.

The ancient architecture of Mesopotamia encompassed several distinct cultures and spanned a period from the 10th millennium BC, when the first permanent structures were built in the 6th century BC. Among the Mesopotamian architectural accomplishments are the development of urban planning, the courtyard house, and ziggurats. No architectural profession existed in Mesopotamia; however, scribes drafted and managed construction for the government, nobility, or royalty. The local architecture of Iraq was often based on vernacular architecture inherited from one generation to the next. Since the Iraqi society is composed of multicultural social groups with different architectural heritage, old Iraqi cities have several types architecture and urban forms.

Iraq is known for having world-class architects, such as Zaha Hadid, Rifat Chadirji and Hisham N. Ashkouri among others.

== Cinema ==
While the first Iraqi film projection took place in 1909, cinema was not truly regarded as a cultural activity or pastime until the 1920s. The first cinemas, like the famous al-Zawra cinema on Baghdad's bustling thoroughfare al-Rashid, played mostly American silent films for British citizens. In the 1940s under the rule of King Faisal II of Iraq, a real Iraqi cinema began. Supported by British and French financiers, movie production companies established themselves in Baghdad. The Baghdad Studio was established in 1948, but soon came apart when tensions between the Arab and Jewish founders flared up. For the most part, the product was purely commercial, fluffy romances with plenty of singing and dancing often set in small villages. The World of Arts (Dunyat Alfann) studio, which was founded by actors, reached for more serious fare. In 1955, they produced Haidar Al-Omar's Fitna wa Hassan, an Iraqi retelling of Romeo and Juliet, that received international attention. But for the most part, the strong-fist rule of the state discouraged any socially relevant films. In 1959 when King Faisel II's government was overthrown, the Cinema and Theater General organization came into existence with the purpose of promoting the political goals of the new regime both in documentaries and features. Typical were documentaries like the 1969 Al Maghishi Project, which showcased the government's irrigation campaigns and the 1967 A Wedding in Heaven, which celebrates the air force and their weapons system. The 1968 revolution that put the Ba'ath party in power further solidified the government's control of film material, and the state's need to make all films validate its power.

Saddam Hussein's ascension to power in 1979 pushed the Iraqi cinema in a slightly different direction. The drain on national resources from the 1980 Iraq-Iran war brought film production to a near halt. The few films put into production were mainly intent on glorifying a mythic Iraqi history or celebrating Hussein's rule. In 1981, the government commissioned Egyptian filmmaker Salah Abouseif to make Al-Qadisiya, a period epic recounting the triumph of the Arabs over the Persians in 636 AD. Likewise Mohamed Shukri Jameel's melodramatic The Great Question (al-Mas' Ala Al-Kubra) cast British actor Oliver Reed as the vicious Lt-Col Gerard Leachman who is righteously killed in the 1920 Iraqi revolution. In 1980 Hussein promoted his own mythology with the autobiographical 6-hour epic The Long Days (al-Ayyam al-tawila), the saga of Hussein's participation in the 1958 failed assassination attempt on Prime Minister Abd al-Karim Qasim, and his subsequent heroic escape back to Tikrit. The film was edited and partially directed by Terence Young, the British director who made his name helming the early James Bond films Dr. No and Thunderball (film). Hussein is played by Saddam Kamel, a cousin and son-in-law of Hussein's, who eventually ran afoul of the dictator and was murdered in 1996. After Iraq invaded Kuwait, sanctions against Iraq made filmmaking an impossibility in the country, although a new generation of filmmakers is coming alive in Baghdad.

== Music ==
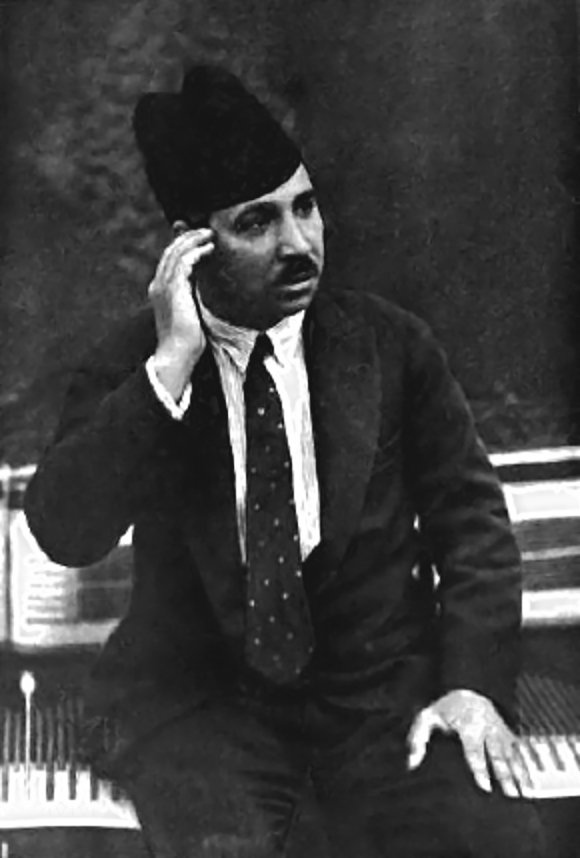
Muhammad al-Qubbanchi performing Maqam

Iraq is known primarily for its rich maqam heritage, which has been passed down orally by the masters of the maqam in an unbroken chain of transmission leading up to the present. The maqam al-Iraqi is considered to be the most noble and perfect form of maqam. Al-maqam al-Iraqi is the collection of sung poems written either in one of the sixteen meters of classical Arabic or in Iraqi dialect (Zuhayri).

This form of art is recognised by UNESCO as "an intangible heritage of humanity".

== Sport ==
Football is the most popular sport in Iraq. The Iraqi Football Association (Arabic: الاتحاد العراقي لكرة القدم) is the governing body of football in Iraq, controlling the Iraq national football team and the Iraq Super League (also known as Dawri Al-Nokba). It was founded in 1948, and has been a member of FIFA since 1950, and the Asian Football Confederation since 1971.

The Iraq national football team were the 2007 AFC Asian Cup Champions after defeating Saudi Arabia in the final, held in Jakarta, Indonesia. In 2006, Iraq reached the football final of the 2006 Asian Games in Doha, Qatar, after defeating former FIFA World Cup semi-finalists South Korea and eventually finished as runners-up, winning silver. The football tournament at the 2004 Summer Olympics in Athens, Greece, saw Iraq finish in fourth place, with the Italy national football team claiming bronze from a single goal.

Basketball, swimming, weightlifting, bodybuilding, boxing, kickboxing, and tennis are also popular sports. Notable sports clubs in Iraq include Al-Shorta, Al-Quwa Al-Jawiya, Al-Zawraa, Erbil SC, Duhok SC, Al Talaba and Najaf FC.

== Cuisine ==
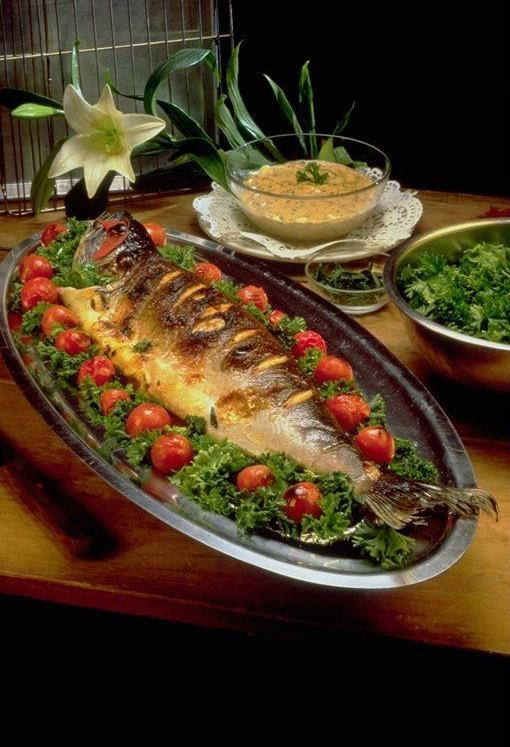
Masghouf fish, one of Iraq's national dishes, a Mesopotamian cuisine dating back to ancient times, typically fish caught from the rivers of Euphrates and Tigris, and grilled near the river bed

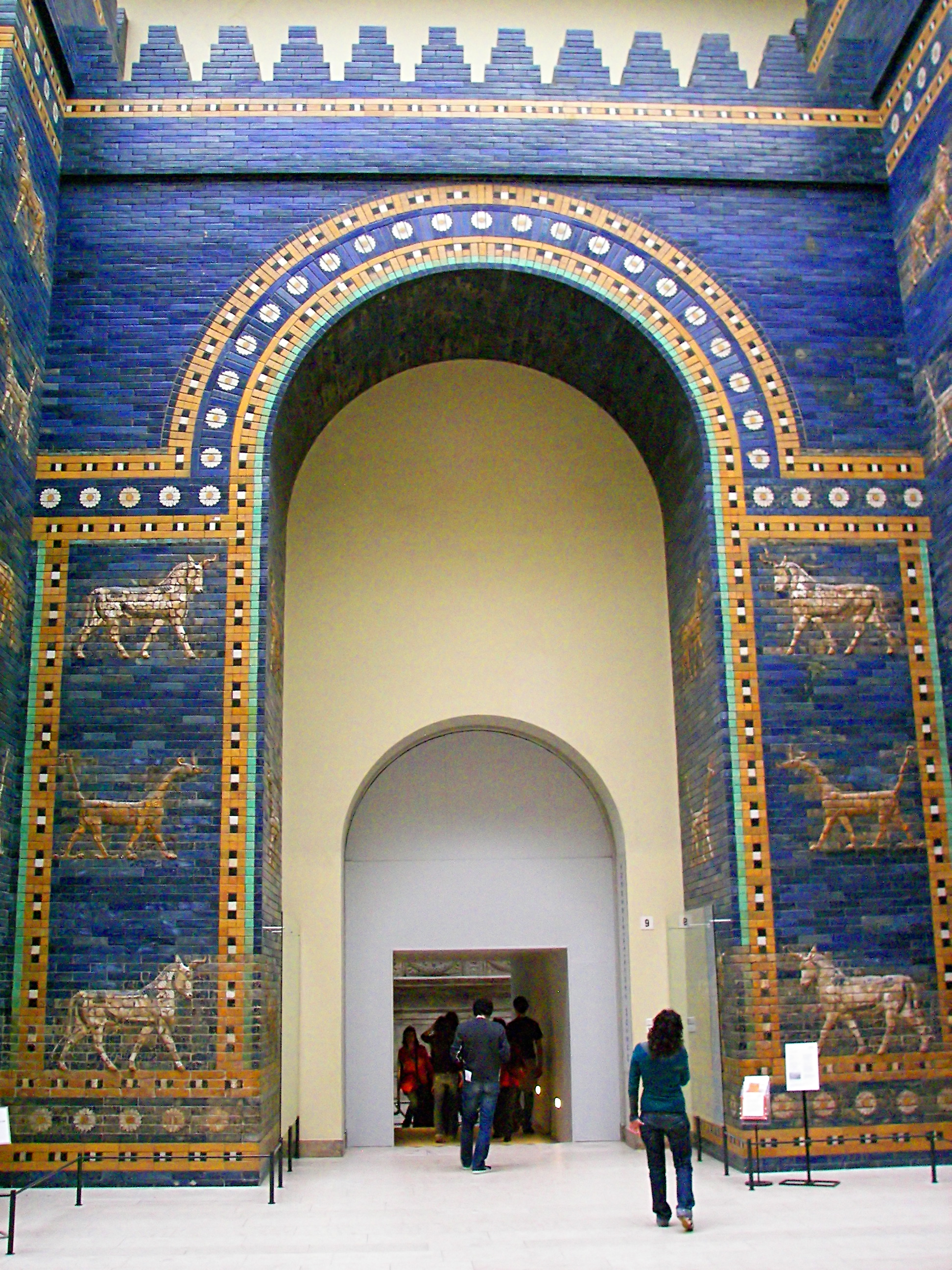
The Lion of Babylon of The Ishtar Gate has remained a prominent symbol of Iraqi culture throughout history.

Iraqi cuisine or Mesopotamian cuisine has a long history going back approximately 10,000 years to the Sumerians, Babylonians, Assyrians, and Ancient Persians. Tablets found in ancient ruins in Iraq show recipes prepared in the temples during religious festivals - the first cookbooks in the world.

During the Islamic Golden Age, the Iraqi culinary arts reached its zenith. In the 10th century, Ibn Sayyar al-Warraq authored the oldest surviving Arabic cookbook, titled the Kitab al-Tabikh (The Book of Dishes). Today, the cuisine of Iraq reflects the inheritance of techniques established during the Islamic Golden Age, as well as strong influences from the culinary traditions of neighbouring Persia, Turkey, and the Syria region.

Popular Iraqi dishes include Kebab (often marinated with garlic, lemon, and spices, then grilled), Gauss (grilled meat sandwich wrap, similar to Döner kebab), Bamieh (lamb, okra, and tomato stew), Quzi (lamb with rice, almonds, raisins, and spices), salads in pita, Kubbah (minced meat ground with bulghur wheat, or rice and spices), Masgûf (grilled fish with pepper and tamarind), and Maqluba (a rice, lamb, tomato, and aubergine dish). Stuffed vegetable dishes such as Dolma and Mahshi are also popular. Machbous is also a popular dish in the south and south east of Iraq.

Contemporary Iraq reflects the same natural division as ancient Mesopotamia, which consisted of Assyria in the arid northern uplands and Babylonia in the southern alluvial plain. Al-Jazira (the ancient Assyria) grows wheat and crops requiring winter chill such as apples and stone fruits. Al-Irāq (Iraq proper, the ancient Babylonia) grows rice and barley, citrus fruits, and is responsible for Iraq's position as the world's largest producer of dates.

== Contemporary culture ==
=== Cultural heritage ===
Iraq has a wide and varied heritage and is home to many religious groups (Muslims, Christians, Jews, Mandaaeans, and Yazidis) and ethnic groups (Arabs, Kurds, and Turkmen). Many present day street markets reflect the local culture and economy, such as the famous al-Safafeer market in Baghdad. This market was established during the Abbasid Caliphate and is one of the oldest in the city. Today, it remains famous for various copper collectables and exhibits.

Tea houses are scattered throughout Iraq. During the afternoon, it is a common practice for shopkeepers to retreat into the back with close friends to sip tea over gossip, an Iraqi siesta.

=== Cultural institutions ===
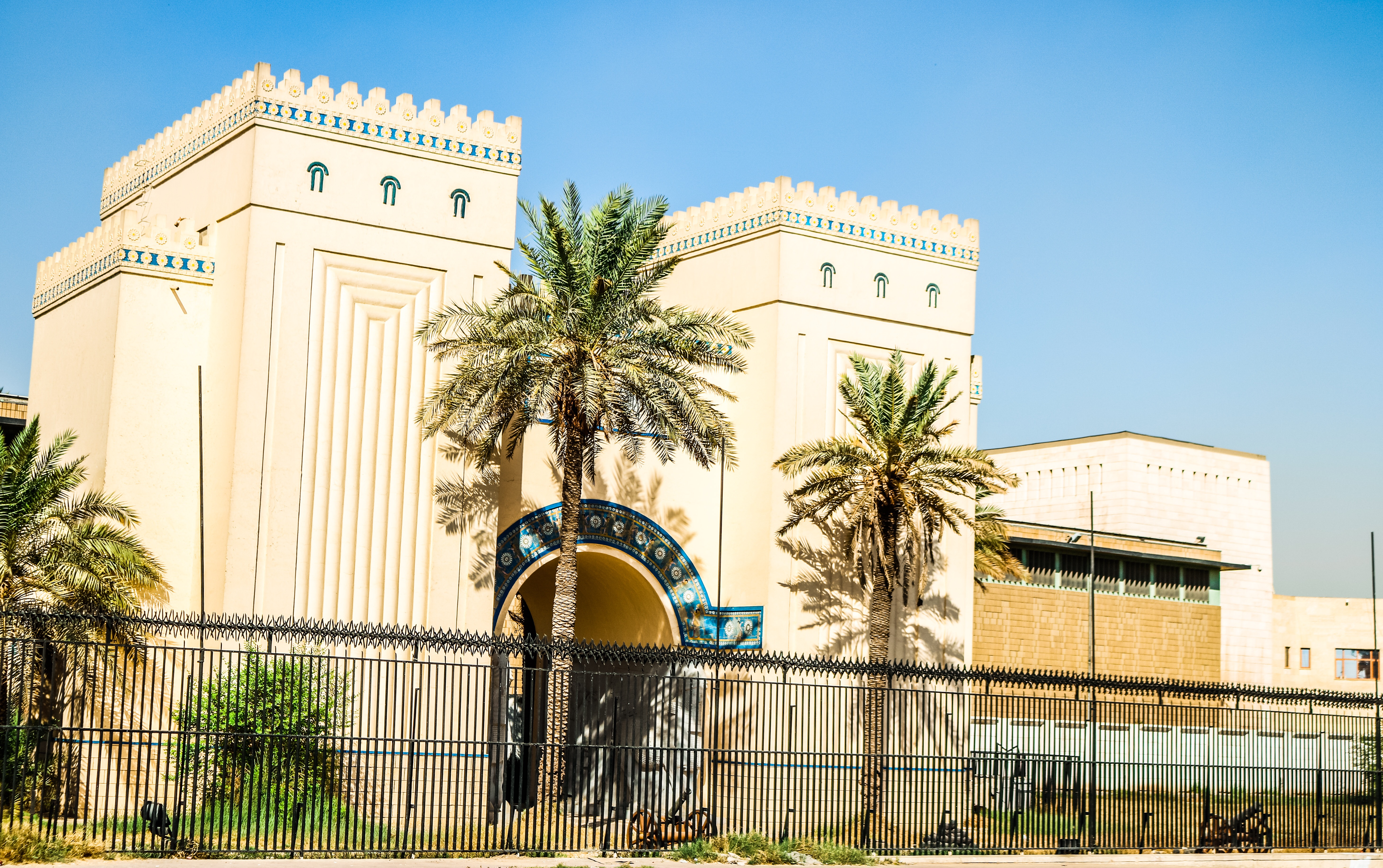
Iraq Museum

Some important cultural institutions in the capital include the Iraqi National Orchestra (rehearsals and performances were briefly interrupted during the Occupation of Iraq, but have since returned to normal) and the National Theatre of Iraq (the theatre was looted during the 2003 Invasion of Iraq, but efforts are underway to restore the theatre). The live theatre scene received a boost during the 1990s, when UN sanctions limited the import of foreign films. As many as 30 movie theatres were reported to have been converted to live stages, producing a wide range of comedies and dramatic productions.

Institutions offering cultural education in Baghdad include the Academy of Music, Institute of Fine Arts, and the Music and Ballet school Baghdad. Baghdad also features a number of museums including the National Museum of Iraq - which houses the world's largest and finest collection of artifacts and relics of ancient Iraqi civilizations; some of which were stolen during the Iraq War.

=== Festivals ===
The Babylon International Festival is a showcase and celebration of traditional Babylonian dance, music, and visual arts. The festival was first established in 1987 and celebrated several times before being discontinued in 2002 amidst political turmoil associated with the Iraq War. The festival returned in 2021 and has since taken place annually. The festival is an international event, drawing visitors and performance artists from around the world.

In 2022, the city of Mosul with support from UNESCO hosted The Mosul Traditional Music Festival. Organizers of the event expressed intent to hold this festival annually.

== Dresses ==
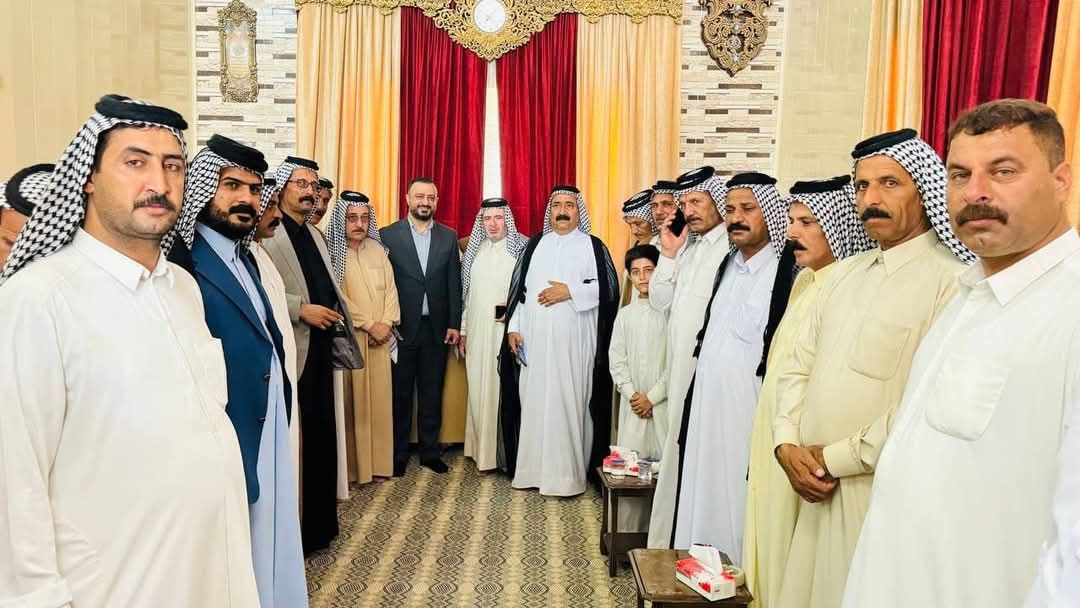

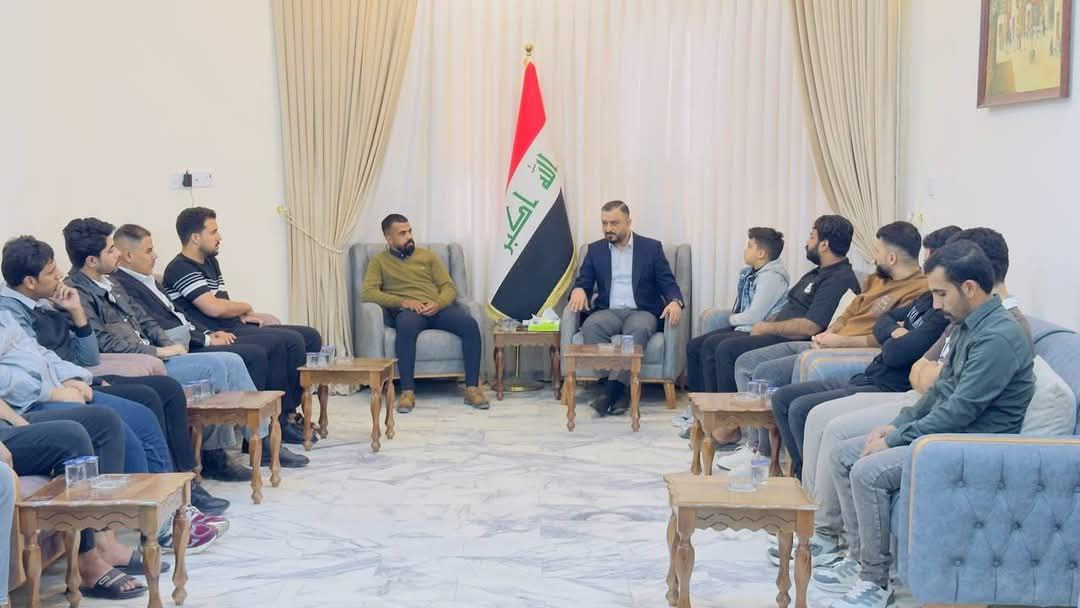

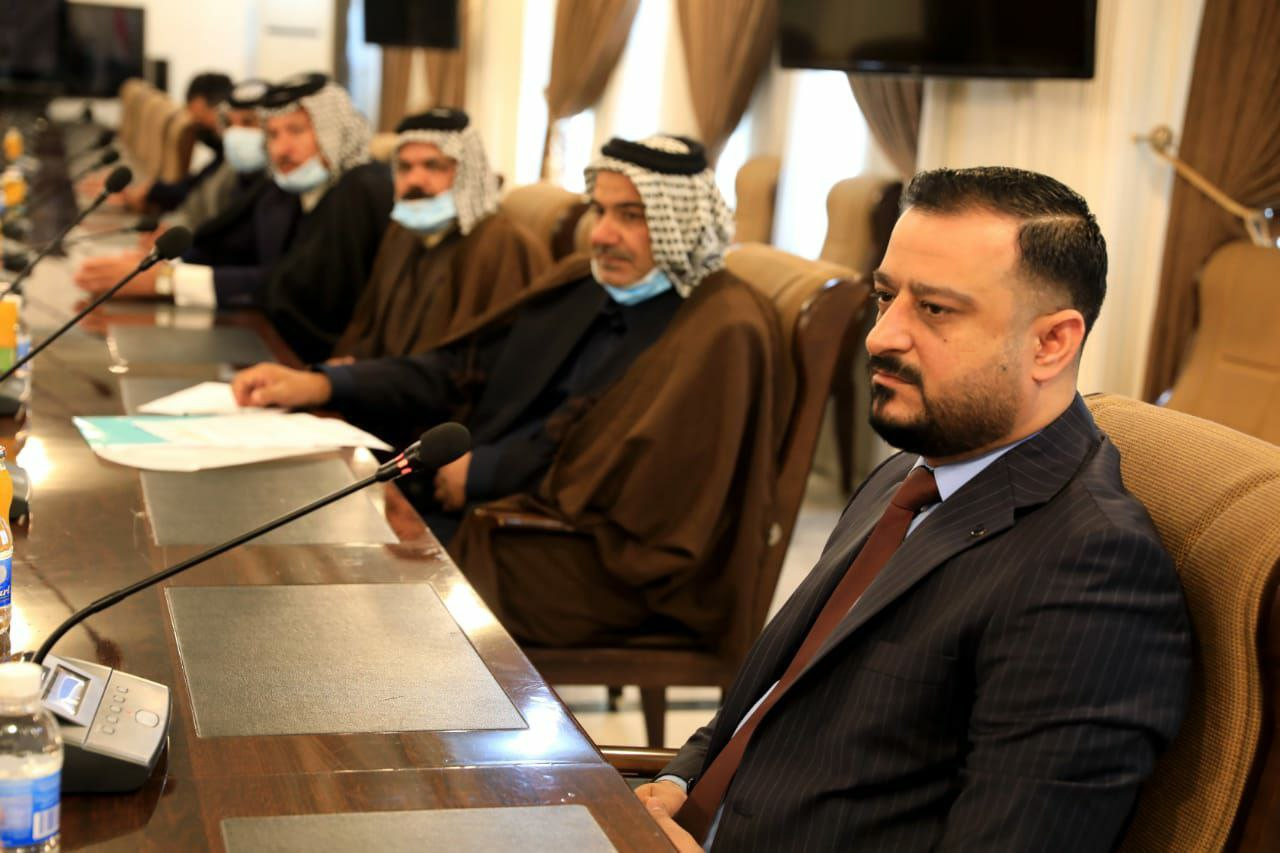

== See also ==
- Iraqi art
- Arabic miniature
- List of World Heritage Sites in Iraq
- Mesopotamia
- List of museums in Iraq
- History of Iraq
- History of Baghdad
- Akkadian Empire
- Assyria
- Babylonia
- Sumer
- Abbasid Caliphate
- Mesopotamian cuisine
