= Albasheer Show =

Iraqi news satire series

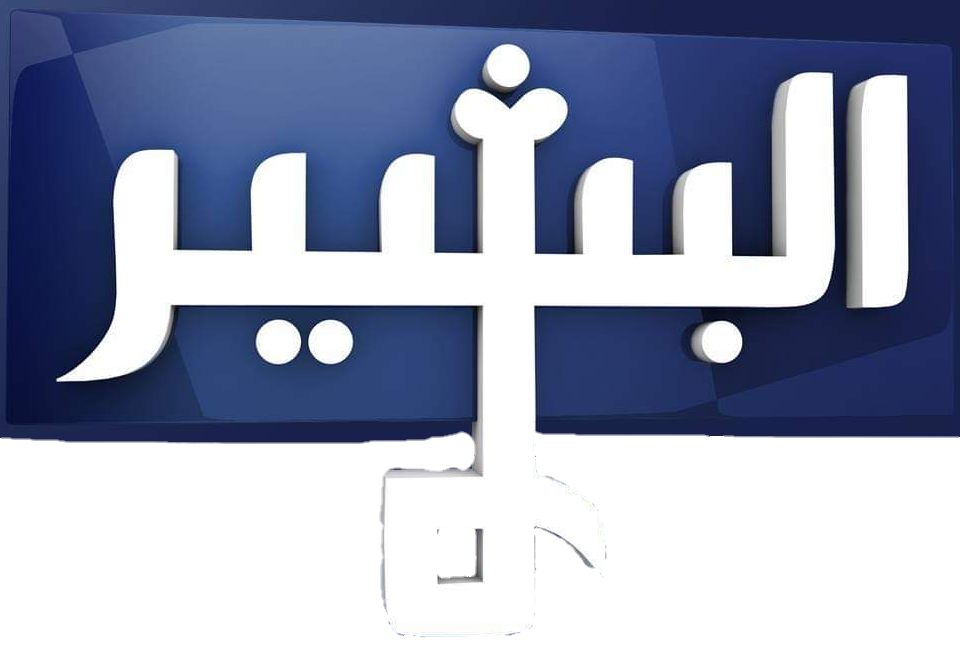
- البشير شو
- Genre: Comedy, news satire, talk show
- Created by: Ahmed Albasheer
- Written by: Ahmed Albasheer
- Directed by: Andrée (earlier)
- Presented by: Ahmad Albasheer
- Starring: Thaer Shuaib; Laith Jarala
- Country of origin: Iraq
- Original language: Arabic
- No. of seasons: 6
- No. of episodes: 142

Production
- Executive producers: Al-Hamza Mohammed; Othman Albasheer
- Producer: Othman Albasheer
- Production location: USA
- Running time: 35–55 minutes

Original release
- Network: Al-Shahid Al-Mustaqil; Al-Sumaria; NRT Arabia; DW Arabia
- Release: August 30, 2014 – present

Albasheer Show (Arabic: البشير شو) is an Iraqi satirical news programme, created and hosted by Ahmed Albasheer. It currently airs weekly on DW's Arabic language channel, with episodes also posted onto YouTube. The show first premiered on 30 August 2014 and until 2017 aired intermittently on various Iraqi television channels. Pressure from the Iraqi Communications and Media Commission has meant that the show is no longer broadcast in Iraq, although citizens are able to access the programme online. By 2015 the show had a recorded audience of 19 million, over half of Iraq's total population, and the show and its host has been called among the most influential in the country, with it being cited as playing a major role in the 2019–2021 Iraqi protests.

== Development and content ==
Albasheer was born in Ramadi, Iraq, and worked for eight years as a political commentator on Iraq's state-owned television channels. In 2011, after being injured in a suicide bombing in which his friend was killed, Albasheer left Iraq and moved to Amman, Jordan, where he set up his own production company, Lagash, in 2012.

The show has been likened to other satirical news programmes including The Daily Show in the United States and Al Bernameg in Egypt. Albasheer Show draws its satire from new stories, political figures, and media organisations, and often criticises the ongoing issues of corruption, sectarianism, extremism and terrorism in Iraq. Typical episodes open with a monologue from Albasheer, followed by exchanges between him and one or more correspondents, who adopt absurd or exaggerated takes on current events, against Albasheer's straight man persona. The final segment is often devoted to an interview with a prominent personality; this has included actors, musicians, writers, and political figures.

Albasheer, whose father and brother were killed during the Iraq War, and who was himself kidnapped and tortured in 2005, has stated his experiences heavily influenced the shape and content of the show, commenting "instead of getting revenge with a weapon, I try to fix the situation so nobody has to go through the things I went through. Instead of turning violent ... I see this as the best way to respond to all the killing".

== List of episodes ==
=== Season 1 ===
No.	Title	Native title	Original air date	Guest(s)
1	Sectarian Chicken	دجاج طائفي	August 30, 2014	N/A
2	Presidential Circumsition	تطهير رئاسي	September 5, 2014	N/A
3	Tallit	الطيلسان	September 29, 2014	N/A
4	Fake Protests	مظاهرات وهمية	October 7, 2014	N/A
5	Indonesian Eid	العيد الاندنوسي	October 11, 2014	N/A
6	How To Fight ISIS	كيف نحارب داعش	October 17, 2014	N/A
7	Know Your Ministers	تعرف على وزراءك	October 24, 2014	N/A
8	The President's Alert	انذار الرئيس	November 7, 2014	N/A
9	Khreetinious	خريطينيوس	November 14, 2014	N/A
10	Tolerance	التسامح	November 21, 2014	N/A
11	Us And The Emirates	نحن والامارات	November 28, 2014	N/A
12	Alien Invasion	الغزو الفضائي	December 5, 2014	N/A
13	We Are The Ones Who Nobody Can Touch Us	احنا المحد يندك بينا	December 15, 2014	N/A
14	The Airplane Flies	الطيارة تطير	December 19, 2014	N/A
15	Suspicious Puberty	مراهقة مريبة	December 22, 2014	N/A
16	Conspiracies	مؤامرات	December 26, 2014	N/A
17	Predictions	تنبؤات	December 29, 2014	N/A
18	Predictions 2	تنبؤات 2	January 3, 2015	Akhlad Raouf, Hassan Al-Falluji (UTN1)
19	Top 3	توب 3	January 5, 2015	N/A
20	Dangerous Discoveries	اكتشافات خطيرة	January 9, 2015	N/A
21	Their Signs	ابراجهم	January 13, 2015	N/A
22	Young Men For Sale	شباب للبيع	January 16, 2015	N/A
23	Haibat Haibeet	هيباط هيبيط	January 19, 2015	N/A
24	A Stick In The Envier's Eye	الحسود بعينه عود	January 23, 2015	N/A
25	The Budget's Solutions	حلول الموازنة	January 27, 2015	N/A
26	Budget / Displaced	الموازنة / النازحين	February 1, 2015	N/A

=== Season 1.5 (Season 2) ===
No.	Title	Native title	Original air date	Guest(s)
1	Extortionater of Them	يا باهضهم	June 10, 2015	Mark Critch
2	Liberation of Mosul	تحرير الموصل	June 20, 2015	Khudhair Hadi
3	Episode 3	الحلقة 3	October 11, 2015	Curtis Cook
4	Episode 4	الحلقة 4	October 20, 2015	N/A
5	Our Leaders	قادتنا	January 15, 2016	Haider Al-Mulla

=== Season 3.2 (Season 3) ===
No.	Title	Native title	Original air date	Guest(s)
1	Technocrat	تكنوقراط	April 15, 2016	Ali Al-Essawi
2	Mu'tasamada	معتصمادا	April 22, 2016	N/A
3	Silencing The Mouths	تكميم الافواه	April 29, 2016	N/A
4	The Extorted Parliament	البرلمان المغتصب	May 6, 2016	Maamoun Al-Nattah
5	Media By The Ammo Sabah Way	الاعلام على طريقة عمو صباح	May 13, 2016	N/A
6	What's The Topic	شنو الموضوع	May 20, 2016	Aliya Nussayyif
7	Cut The Sound	اكطع الصوت	May 27, 2016	N/A
8	Mithreedious	مثريديوس	June 3, 2016	N/A
9	Metaphysics	ميتافيزيقية	June 10, 2016	Shujaa Al-Khafaji
10	Th Red Wall	الحائط الاحمر	June 24, 2016	Eva Kaili
11	Us And Bahrain	احنة والبحرين	July 1, 2016	N/A
12	Karrada And The Detergent Detector	الكرادة وكاشف الزاهي	July 8, 2016	Salim al-Jabouri
13	K-9 Took The Blame	كي ناين شال القضية	July 15, 2016	N/A
14	The Legendary Hotness	الحر الاسطوري	July 22, 2016	N/A
15	Massoum Where Is The Halqoom	معصوم وين الحلقوم	July 29, 2016	Fareed Lafta
16	Abu Al-Kubba	ابو الكبة	August 5, 2016	N/A
17	Repentance Only	توبة الا نصوحة	August 12, 2016	N/A
18	Reputation And Oil	سمعة و نفط	August 19, 2016	N/A
19	Five Clinks	خمسة كلينكس	August 27, 2016	N/A
20	Hoshiar Park	هوشيار بارك	September 2, 2016	N/A
21	Houthis Is Here	الحوثيين يمنا	September 9, 2016	Claudia Roth
22	Al Maliki Show	المالكي شو	September 16, 2016	N/A
23	Albasheer Show Emmy	ايمي البشير شو	September 23, 2016	N/A
24	Affectionate Father	الاب الحنون	September 30, 2016	Zainab Salbi
25	The Owner Of The Long Tunnel	صاحب النفق الطويل	October 7, 2016	N/A
26	Take That, It's The Last One	هاك الاخيرة	October 14, 2016	N/A
27	Best Clips Of Season Three	افضل مقاطع موسم 3.2	October 21, 2016	N/A
28	From Inside Albasheer Show	من داخل البشير شو	October 28, 2016	N/A

=== Season 4 ===
No.	Title	Native title	Original air date	Guest(s)
1	The Mission Is Not Impossible	المهمة مو مستحيلة	April 21, 2017	Dr. Sabah Al-Tameemi
2	Umm Ahmed Is Our Cause	ام احمد قضيتنا	April 28, 2017	Awad Al-Awadi
3	Tomato Commission	مفوضية الطماطة	May 5, 2017	N/A
4	The Land Is Sold	مبيوعة الكاع	May 12, 2017	Ibrahim Al-Effendi
5	The Iraqi Experience	التجربة العراقية	May 19, 2017	N/A
6	Angels And Clans	ملائكة و عشائر	May 26, 2017	N/A
7	Number Seven Is The Reason	رقم سبعة السبب	July 7, 2017	N/A
8	The Hidden Shield	الدرع الخفي	June 2, 2017	Raad And Methak
9	Ramadan Competitions	مسابقات رمضان	June 9, 2017	Joe Raad
10	Detachable Void	انفصال باطل	June 16, 2017	N/A
11	The Poorest Party On The Planet	افقر حزب بالكرة الارضية	June 23, 2017	N/A
12	Hot Clips	مقاطع ساخنة	July 14, 2017	Larry Charles
13	The Shaded Train	القطار المظلل	July 21, 2017	Sarwa Abdel Wahed
14	The Sad Week	الاسبوع الحزين	July 28, 2017	N/A
15	Under The Razor	تحت موس الحلاق	August 4, 2017	Maysoon Al-Damluji
16	Wak Iqbal	وك اقبال	August 11, 2017	Joseph Saliwa
17	Anbar And Basra	الانبار و البصرة	August 18, 2017	N/A
18	The Rice	التمن	August 25, 2017	Rehab Al-Abouda and Razan Sheikh Delir
19	Buses	الباصات	September 8, 2017	N/A
20	Albasheer Show Emmy 2	ايمي البشير شو 2	September 15, 2017	N/A
21	Kurdistan Referendum	استفتاء كردستان	September 22, 2017	N/A
22	The Big Plot	المؤامرة الكبرى	September 29, 2017	N/A
23	Religious Or Civil Parties	الاحزاب الدينية او المدنية	October 6, 2017	Mohamed Masoud Jomaa
24	Friday The 13th	الجمعة الـ13	October 13, 2017	N/A
25	The Time That We Messed It	زمان لعبنا به	October 20, 2017	Hussam Al-Rassam
26	Our Stages	مراحلنا	October 27, 2017	N/A
27	The Most Beautiful Clips Of The Season	أجمل مقاطع الموسم 4	November 3, 2017	N/A

=== Season 5 ===
No.	Title	Native title	Original air date	Guest(s)
1	Am Back For Them	راجعلهم	March 30, 2018	N/A
2	Electoral Circumcision	طهور انتخابي	April 6, 2018	N/A
3	Service	خدمة	April 13, 2018	Falah Almashal
4	We Can Do This	احنا كدها	April 20, 2018	Laith Aldilamy
5	What Have You Done To Us ?	شسويتولنا	April 27, 2018	Dr.Ali Alrufaie
6	The Person That's Been Chosen Doesn't Chosen Again	المجرب لا يجرب	May 4, 2018	Hamad Al-Mosawi
7	That's Enough	كافي	May 11, 2018	Shorouq Alabaiji
8	Tuk Tuk	تك تك	May 18, 2018	N/A
9	Gloating	شماتة	May 25, 2018	N/A
10	Cook	طبخة	June 1, 2018	Ali Almansory
11	Iraq To Where ?	العراق الى اين	June 29, 2018	N/A
12	The Clean Episode	الحلقة النظيفة	July 6, 2018	N/A
13	Heat	حرارة	July 13, 2018	N/A
14	Country Demonstrations	مظاهرات وطن	July 20, 2018	N/A
15	How We Demonstration ?	كيف نتظاهر	July 27, 2018	N/A
16	Corrupt Ministry	وزارة مضروبة	August 3, 2018	N/A
17	The Miracle Child	الطفل المعجزة	August 10, 2018	Husam Alhaj
18	We And Iran	احنا و ايران	August 17, 2018	N/A
19	Wonders And Marvels	عجائب و غرائب	August 24, 2018	Bassem Khashan and Fares Haram
20	Contamination	تلوث	August 31, 2018	Mohamad Alfaras
21	Ferris Wheel	دولاب الهواء	September 7, 2018	N/A
22	Soleimani And McGurk	سليماني و ماكغورك	September 14, 2018	N/A
23	The Young President	الشاب الرئيس	September 21, 2018	N/A
24	My Resignation	استقالتي	September 28, 2018	N/A
25	Wiiiii	ويييييي	October 5, 2018	N/A
26	The Last Meeting	اللقاء الاخير	October 12, 2018	N/A
27	Everything Behind The Scene	الكواليس كالوس كالوس	October 19, 2018	N/A
28	The Season Clips	مقاطع الموسم	October 26, 2018	N/A

=== Season 6 ===
No.	Title	Native title	Original air date	Guest(s)
1	The Republic	الجمهورية	July 19, 2019	N/A
2	Punishments	العقوبات	July 26, 2019	N/A
3	Government Of WhatsApp	حكومة الواتساب	August 2, 2019	N/A
4	The Dreams	الاحلام	August 9, 2019	N/A
5	The Court	المحكمة	August 16, 2019	N/A
6	Achievements	الإنجازات	August 30, 2019	Zahra Habib Ben Mime
7	The Guessing	الحزورة	September 6, 2019	N/A
8	Crimes	جرائم	September 13, 2019	N/A
9	The Speed Era	عصر السرعة	September 20, 2019	N/A
10	Iraq Is Rising	العراق ينتفض	October 4, 2019	N/A
11	Dictatorship	الدكتاتورية	October 11, 2019	N/A
12	The Arguments Of Adel	تركيعات دلدل	October 18, 2019	N/A
13	The Final Report	التقرير النهائي	October 25, 2019	N/A
14	awakening of people	صحوة شعب	November 1, 2019	N/A
15	Scapegoat	كبش الفداء	November 8, 2019	N/A
16	Not That Much	مو هلثوخون	November 15, 2019	Olena Sotnyk
17	Pistachio Government	حكومة فستق	November 22, 2019	N/A
18	We Are Where We Are	نحن حيث نحن	December 6, 2019	N/A
19	Punishments 2	العقوبات الجزء الثاني	December 13, 2019	N/A
20	Treasury Demonstrations	مظاهرات الخزانة	December 20, 2019	N/A
21	The Cassettee Revolution	ثورة الكاسيت	December 27, 2019	N/A
22	We annoyed them	ازعجناهم	January 3, 2020	N/A
23	The Great Generation	جيل الطيبين	January 10, 2020	Bilal Wahab
24	Duldul and China	دلدل والصين	January 17, 2020	N/A
25	Psychological Problems	مشاكل نفسية	January 24, 2020	Joey Hood
26	Hear and Obedience	سمعاً و طاعة	January 31, 2020	N/A
27	The Republic Scenes	مشاهد الجمهورية	February 7, 2020	N/A
28	Behind The Scenes	كواليس الجمهورية	February 14, 2020	N/A

== Critical reception ==
The popularity of Albasheer Show amongst Iraqi audiences has been attributed to both Albasheer's comedy, which includes utilising dark sarcasm, local stereotyping and sexual innuendos, alongside his relatability due to public recognition of losses he experienced, like many Iraqi citizens, during the Iraq War. Albasheer's outspoken nature, and in particular his holding the Iraqi government to account, has been cited as empowering many Iraqis to speak out in protest, and he and the show have been cited as major influences over ongoing protests in Iraq.

The show's content has led to threats being made to Albasheer, who no longer lives in Iraq. One consistent target for mockery on the show has been the Islamic State, which controlled the city of Mosul between 2014 and 2017, who made several death threats against Albasheer as a result. Attempts have also been made by various groups to ban the broadcast of the show; the Iraqi Communications and Media Commission successfully stopped Iraqi television channels from broadcasting the show, while in Albasheer's hometown of Ramadi, the show was criticised as being an "apostate" programme, meaning anyone found watching it could be flogged.

The government of Iraq has been critical of the content of Albasheer Show and launched a criminal prosecution against Albasheer for producing the programme, which led to him being imprisoned for four days and delaying the premiere of the third season. While the show continues to be broadcast into Iraq, multiple attempts have been made to attempt to block the programme, although more recently some Iraqi politicians have appeared as guests on the programme.
