= Ahmed Albasheer =

Iraqi comedian (born 1984)

- أحمد البشير
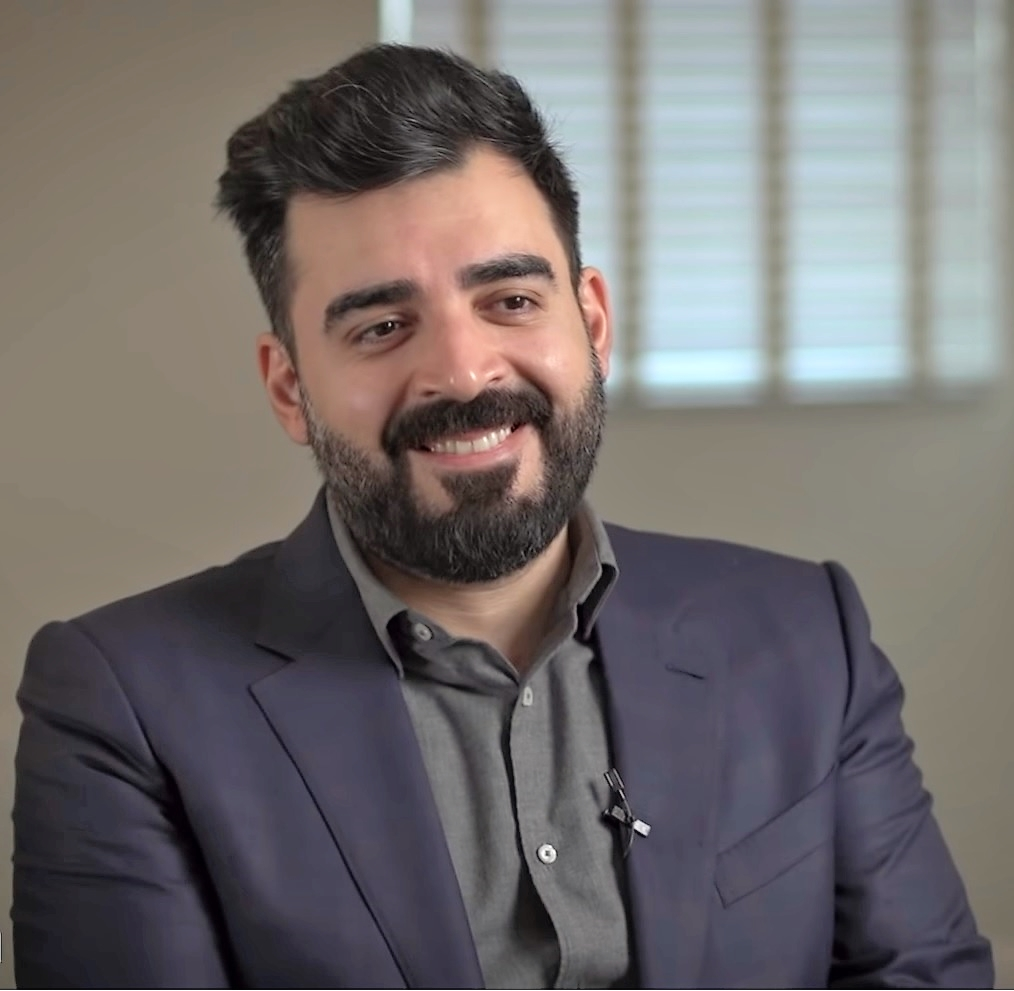
- Albasheer on Reason TV in 2021
- Born: Ahmed Abdul Hadi Abdul Salam; 17 October 1984 (age 41); Baghdad, Iraq
- Education: Nahrain University
- Occupations: Comedian, stand-up comedian, humor TV shows presenter, director, journalist
- Years active: 2012–present
- Known for: Albasheer Show
- Relatives: Othman Albasheer (brother)

Ahmed Albasheer (Arabic: أحمد البشير; born 17 October 1984) is an Iraqi comedian, journalist, and director, best known as the creator and host of the weekly political satire show Albasheer Show. He was named one of the twenty most influential people in the Arab world by the Global Influence Research Centre.

== Early life ==
Albasheer was born and raised in Ramadi, Iraq, He lost several family members during the Iraq War, including his brother and father, and was himself kidnapped and tortured by a militia in 2005. Albasheer trained as a journalist at Nahrain University in Baghdad and went on to work for state-owned Iraqi television.

== Career ==
Until 2011, Albasheer worked for eight years as a political correspondent for Iraq's state-run news channels.

In 2012, after moving to Jordan, Albasheer established his own media production company, Lagash, which in 2014 began broadcasting his eponymous show, Albasheer Show. Heavily influenced by Jon Stewart, who hosted the American political satire show The Daily Show from 1999 until 2015, the show satirised Iraqi politics, including ongoing corruption, sectarianism, extremism and terrorism. By 2015, the show had attained an audience of 19 million, over half of Iraq's total population. The show has changed channels multiple times since its premiere due to threats from the Iraqi Communications and Media Commission, and is currently broadcast from outside of Iraq on Deutsche Welle's Arabic channel, in addition to on YouTube, where the show has amassed over five million subscribers as of 2021. Albasheer Show has been cited as playing an integral role in the anti-government 2019–2021 Iraqi protests.

In 2019, Albasheer received a Maurice R. Greenberg World Fellowship at Yale University.

He appeared in the Netflix documentary series Larry Charles’ Dangerous World of Comedy in 2019.

In 2020, Albasheer featured in the critically acclaimed documentary series Once Upon a Time in Iraq.

=== 2026 Presidential Election ===
On 31 December 2025, Ahmed Albasheer announced his candidacy for the Iraqi presidency in the 2026 elections. He described in his candidacy statement that he ran due to “ Given the political and economic challenges facing our beloved country, and stemming from our commitment to our national duty towards Iraq…”. Later, his candidacy was rejected due to him, in exile, not able to attend the physical examination required.

== Personal life ==
In 2011, after being injured in a suicide bombing, Albasheer moved to Amman, Jordan, where he resided until 2019.
