= Civil Society for Reform =

Civil Society for Reform التجمع المدني للإصلاح
- Chairman: Salim al-Jabouri
- Founders: Salim al-Jabouri
- Founded: 2017; 8 years ago
- Headquarters: Baghdad
- Religion: Islam
- National affiliation: State of Law Coalition
- Colours: blue, red

The Civil Society for Reform, (Arabic: التجمع المدني للإصلاح), is an Iraqi political party recently established by the Speaker of the Iraqi Council of Representatives Salim al-Jabouri.

== History ==
This political party was founded on August 15, 2017 by the Speaker of the Iraqi Council of Representatives Salim al-Jabouri. al-Abadi intends to enter into the Iraqi elections with Iyad Allawi in the "National Coalition", which will be held in May 2018.
