= Al-Qamamin =

Qamamine is a village in Akkar Governorate, Lebanon. It is located at an altitude of 800 meters above sea level and includes a guesthouse the surrounding natural area. The area is mountainous and popular for trekking. The Qabeit al-Qamamin bridge is in the area and connects to the village of Qabeit.
