= Syrians in Lebanon =

Syrians in Lebanon السوريون في لبنان
Total population
- 1,011,366 registered (December 2016); 929,624 registered (July 2019); 774,697 (June 2024); 273,094 (January 2026)

Regions with significant populations
- Beirut (Greater Beirut), Tripoli, Sidon, Baalbek

Languages
- Arabic, Kurdish, Turkish, Syriac

Religion
- Islam and Christianity

Syrians in Lebanon (Arabic: السوريون في لبنان) refers to the Syrian migrant workers and, more recently, to the Syrian refugees who fled to Lebanon during the Syrian Civil War. The relationship between Lebanon and Syria includes Lebanese president's-requested aid during Lebanon's Civil War which led to a 29-year occupation of Lebanon by Syria ending in 2005. Following the outbreak of the Syrian Civil War, refugees began entering Lebanon in 2011.

In 2011–2016 over 1.5 million refugees from Syria settled in the neighboring country of Lebanon.

Lebanon's initial response towards the influx of refugees has been criticized as negative, with the Lebanese government leaving them undocumented and limited[8] and attacks on Syrian refugees by Lebanese citizens which go unaddressed by authorities.[9] Despite the strained relationship between the Syrians and Lebanese,[6] taking into consideration only Syrian refugees, Lebanon has historically had one of the highest numbers of refugees per capita in the world, with estimates of roughly one refugee per four nationals at peak levels.[10] The power dynamic and position of Syria and Lebanon changed drastically in such a short amount of time, it is inevitable that sentiments and prejudices prevailed despite progressions and changes in circumstance.[11] In 2024, Lebanese leaders discussed Syrian migrant issues, considering repatriation and limiting numbers due to the escalating crisis.

Following regional developments beginning in late 2024, the Syrian refugee population in Lebanon declined significantly as large-scale returns to Syria accelerated, reducing overall figures from prior peak estimates of around 1.5 million and marking a shift in the country’s refugee dynamics.

Cumulatively, reporting from UN agencies, media sources, and Lebanese authorities indicates that several hundred thousand Syrians have left Lebanon since late 2024 through a combination of conflict-driven displacement, organized voluntary return programs, and continued cross-border movements, with some estimates placing totals in the upper hundreds of thousands.

== Background ==
While both Lebanon and Syria were under Ottoman rule until 1918, what was then known as Mount Lebanon became home to Maronite Christian and Druze minorities who immigrated from all over the region, including modern day Syria. These religious differences, as well as the relative isolation due to the mountainous terrain, accompanied with the fact that Mount Lebanon maintained a self-governing status in the Ottoman Empire, were some of the main factors that led to the division of the two countries under the French Mandate from 1923, following a period of uncertainty in the region.

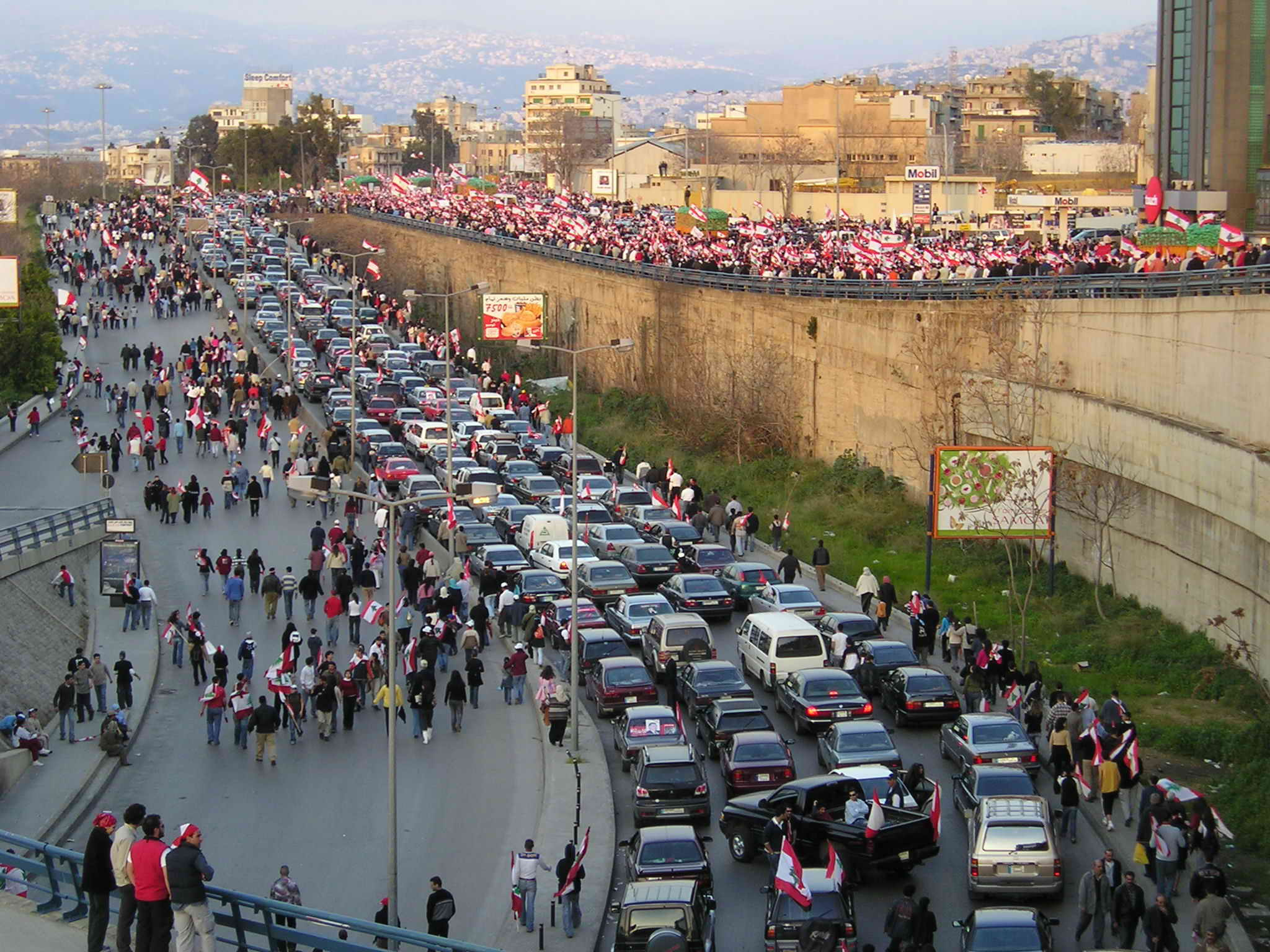
Demonstrations in Lebanon (2005) after the assassination of the former Lebanese Prime Minister Rafik Hariri on February pressuring Syria to leave Lebanon.

After both Lebanon and Syria gained independence from the French in the 1940s, they maintained their own autonomy (although Syria did not officially recognize Lebanon's independence until 2008) until 1976 when Syria occupied Lebanon as part of the Arab Deterrent Force under the premise of resolving the dispute of the Lebanese civil war. Although Taif Accord was signed in 1989, putting an official end to the civil war, Syrian forces remained in Lebanon. Syria's role in Lebanon changed over the years of the civil war from an intervention to an occupation. After the Taif Accord was signed, Syrian forces remained in Lebanon under the justification of Israel's failure to withdraw, as per the accord. AN estimated 35,000 (by the year 2000) Syrian troops remained in Lebanon. The Syrian occupation of Lebanon lasted until 2005. During the Syrian occupation, the government under Hafez al-Assad, extending to Bashar al-Assad after 2000, the Syrian government carried out infringements of human rights, including the detention of Lebanese citizens in Syrian-occupied Lebanon without trial and torturing them without rights for legal council. In light of those who went missing during, what the Human Rights Watch described as, a "terror campaign" of censorship and fear inflicted on the Lebanese citizens, a negative sentiment to develop within the Lebanese population against Syria.

Following the end of the Syrian occupation, many Syrians have immigrated to Lebanon in search of work and better living standards. Movement between the two countries was relatively easy as an ID card was enough to cross the border.

As a result of the civil war in Syria commencing in 2011 between the government of President Bashar al‑Assad and rebel groups, refugees began entering Lebanon in large numbers, and quickly. This sudden influx of refugees has resulted in the overpopulation of existing camps and cities as well a drain on resources. This sudden and urgent circumstance led to tension between Lebanese citizens and Syrian refugees. The Lebanese government did not make an attempt to account for these refugees; it instead blocked aid to them in a passive dissent to their immigration. Border crossing restrictions were issued for Syrians crossing into Lebanon, which only led to the movement of asylum seekers shifting to illegal smuggling.

== Statistics ==
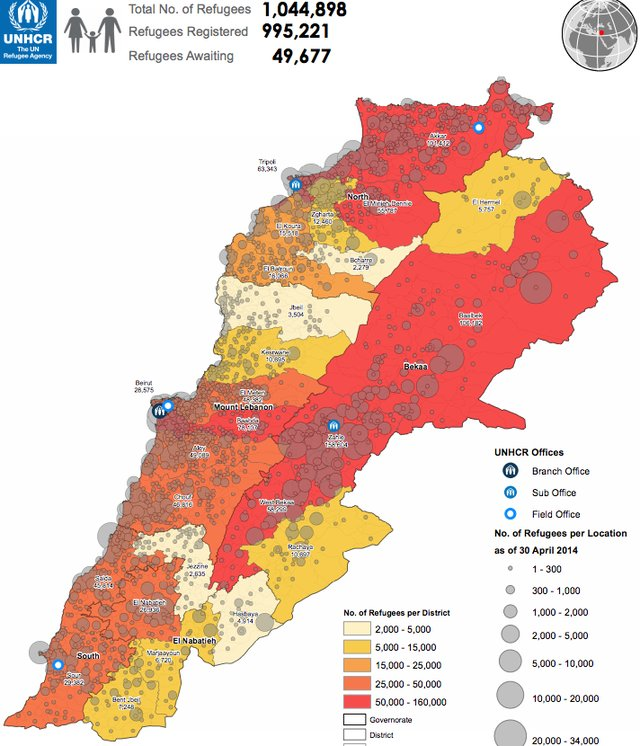
Distribution of Syrian refugees in Lebanon as of April 30, 2014

According to the UNHCR, there were over one million Syrian refugees who had been registered in Lebanon in 2016. Nevertheless, this figure is likely largely underestimated since the UNHCR has stopped registering new Syrian refugees since May 2015, and it doesn't include individuals awaiting registration. Hence, precise figures of the number of Syrian people in Lebanon don't exist currently. 2016 estimates were as high as 1,500,000 people.

As of 30 June 2024, the official distribution of registered refugees is as follows:

UNHCR Official Population Distribution
Location	Population	% of total Population
Bekaa	292,348	37.7%
North Lebanon	219,556	28.3%
Beirut	175,815	22.7%
South Lebanon	86,978	11.2%

Of the registered refugees, 53.1% are under the age of 18.

Along with Syrians, the influx of refugees due to the conflict includes 35,000 Lebanese returnees and 31,502 Palestinian refugees from Syria.

Given the estimated population of Lebanon at 5.9 million, the 1.5 million Syrian refugees make Lebanon the country with the highest number of refugees per capita – with one refugee for every four nationals. Syrian refugee statistics documented by the UNHCR were ordered to cease in 2015 by the Lebanese government, the reason behind this is uncertain.

Most Syrian refugees rent apartments, partly due to the absence of formal refugee camps. More than 80% of them rent accommodation in 1700 locations countrywide at an average price of $200 a month. The rest of them – whose percentage keeps increasing due to the deepening vulnerability – had to settle in unfinished buildings, garages, abandoned sheds, work sites and tents in informal settlements.

=== Chronology of the registration of Syrian refugees post 2011 ===
The exact number of refugees is difficult to pin down, but national politicians have used the refugee question for electoral purposes, in particular in the context of the campaign for the general elections scheduled in 2018.

- January 2014 – Prime Minister Najib Mikati declare that 900,000 “conflict refugees” came to Lebanon, “approaching a quarter of the population.”
- April 2014 – UNHCR states that Syrian refugees in Lebanon have passed the 1-million mark.
- May 2015 – UNHCR stops the registration of new refugees and asylum seekers. The peak number of 1.2 million then decreased to 1 million by 2017, as a share of officially registered refugees were resettled, departed or died.
- September 2015 – ⁣Gebran Bassil, Minister of Foreign Affairs of Lebanon, referred to refugees as a burden, arguing that the one-million figure doesn’t account for all concerned: "it's 1.5 [million Syrians] plus 500,000 Palestinians so 45–50% of the population."
- October 2017: Esther Pinzari, UNHCR protection officer, explained Syrian refugees total 1 million in Lebanon. The Lebanese government, in the meantime, puts the number over 1.5 million, claiming that even that number is an understatement.
- October 2024: According to Lebanese government statistics, more than 400,000 people - a vast majority of them Syrian - had crossed from Lebanon into Syria to escape escalating Israeli bombardment. On October 25, UNHCR released a report stating, a total of approximately 440,000 people (Lebanese, Syrians and third-country nationals) are estimated to have crossed from Lebanon to Syria since the escalation of hostilities in Lebanon. It is estimated that 71 percent are Syrians and 29 percent are Lebanese and other country nationals.
- November 2024
  - On November 2, UNHCR released their daily report stating, a total of approximately 473,000 people (Lebanese, Syrians and third-country nationals) are estimated to have crossed from Lebanon to Syria since the escalation of hostilities in Lebanon. It is estimated that 71 percent are Syrians and 29 percent are Lebanese and other country nationals.
  - On November 9, UNHCR released their daily report stating, a total of approximately 528,000 people (Lebanese, Syrians and third-country nationals) are estimated to have crossed from Lebanon to Syria since the escalation of hostilities in Lebanon. It is estimated that 70 percent are Syrians and 30 percent are Lebanese and other country nationals.
  - On November 20, UNHCR released their daily report stating, a total of approximately 557,000 people (Lebanese, Syrians and third-country nationals) are estimated to have crossed from Lebanon to Syria since the escalation of hostilities in Lebanon. It is estimated that 70 percent are Syrians and 30 percent are Lebanese and other country nationals.

Recent returns (2024–present)

- Following the fall of the Syrian government in December 2024, returns of Syrian refugees from Lebanon increased significantly. According to the United Nations High Commissioner for Refugees (UNHCR), approximately 379,000 to 400,000 Syrians returned from Lebanon in 2025.
- Lebanese authorities reported higher figures, stating that more than 500,000 Syrians had left Lebanon in 2025, including through organized return initiatives coordinated with government agencies.
- In 2026, cross-border movements from Lebanon into Syria increased sharply amid renewed regional hostilities. UNHCR reported that more than 200,000 people entered Syria from Lebanon between 2 and 27 March 2026, through three official crossing points, according to Syrian authorities. By 19 May 2026, UNHCR reported that 367,291 Syrians had crossed from Lebanon into Syria since 2 March.
- By 10 August 2026, the International Organization for Migration (IOM) reported that 123,620 people arriving from Lebanon had been identified across 1,163 locations in Syria, including 123,145 Syrian nationals and 475 Lebanese nationals. IOM stated that the number had peaked at 153,087 on 27 April, after which approximately 29,467 Syrian and Lebanese nationals returned to Lebanon. Separately, IOM recorded 655,720 movements into Syria through four monitored border crossings between 2 March and 10 August, approximately 98% of which involved Syrian nationals; these figures represented border-crossing movements rather than unique individuals.

=== Naturalization and Syrians ===
Excessive restrictions were placed on Lebanese citizenship due to the importance of the country's demographic balance in its political operations. However, Armenian and Assyrian refugees came to Lebanon in 1915 from present-day southeastern Turkey, following the Armenian and Assyrian genocide. And when Lebanon was formed after Ottoman rule subsided, these Armenians and Assyrians were given citizenship to Lebanon. Also, under the Syrian-occupied Lebanon in 1994, the government naturalized over 154,931 foreign residents, of Palestinian (mostly Palestinian Christians) and Syrian (mostly Syrian Sunnis and Christians) descent. The purpose of these naturalization was to sway the elections to a pro-Syrian government. This allegation is based on how these new citizens were bused in to vote and displayed higher voting rates than the nationals did.

On June 1, 2018, the notoriously anti-naturalization Lebanese president, Michel Aoun signed a naturalization decree granting citizenship to a reported 300 individuals. These individuals come for various backgrounds and religions, however all of them are in one way wealthy and have ties to Syrian president, Bashar al-Assad.

The final offesive of the rebels Hayat Tahrir Al-Sham that managed to overthrow Assad's regime in Syria, caused a new move of refugees towards the Lebanese border. Lebanon harried to close its borders except the Masnaa Border Crossing. It was reported on December 12 that 1,422 refugees entered Lebanon while 881 left the country via the border crossing, 70 were captured after enterring via smuggling routes.

== Ethnic groups ==
Although the majority of Syrians in Lebanon are Arabs (including Palestinians residing in Syria), there exists various ethnic and religious minorities, namely Syrian Armenians, Syrian Turkmen and Syrian Kurds.

=== Palestinians ===
This group consists of descendants of the Palestinian refugees who reached Syria after the 1948 Palestinian expulsion and flight, and then moved from Syria to Lebanon because of the Syrian civil war that started in 2011. The Palestinians refugees from Syria have been met with favor from existing palestinian communities in Lebanon. In January 2015, more Palestinians refugees were recorded to be in Syria than in Lebanon, including the already existing refugees preceding 2011, although in light of the European Migrant Crisis, the numbers have allegedly dropped with many fleeing to Europe and a few to Lebanon.

=== Turkmen ===
In October 2015, the Syrian independent newspaper Zaman Al Wasl reported that 125,000 to 150,000 Syrian Turkmen refugees arrived in Lebanon, now outnumbering the Turkish minority of Lebanon. Many of them settled in the small village of Kaweishra known for its Turkish identity. The Turkish government has previously sent out food aid specifically for Turkmen refugees in Lebanon.

In 2018 the number of Syrian Turkmen in Lebanon had increased to approximately 200,000.

=== Kurds ===
Following the unification of Syria and Egypt in 1958 which resulted in strong Arab nationalism, oppressive measures were taken against Kurds in Syria. This led to a wave of Syrian Kurds resettling into Lebanon. More recently, due to the influx of refugees from the Syrian civil war, a large number of Kurds sought asylum in Lebanon where there was already a significant and well-integrated Kurdish population, despite being underrepresented. Estimates vary on the exact number of Kurdish asylum seekers due to the fact that they are legally registered no differently than Arab Syrians, though some sources estimate the number to be as high as 500,000, almost half of all documented Syrian refugees.

=== Armenians ===
Due to the strong support of Armenian institutions and communities in Lebanon, Syrian Armenians have had a relatively smooth integration in Lebanese society. This includes the fact that almost all Syrian-Armenian children are able to study for free in Armenian schools in Lebanon and have an integrated and parliament-represented foundation to rely on. Most sources estimate the number of the displaced population at around 10,000 people.

== Difficulties ==
=== Immigration policies ===
The Lebanese government has historically maintained an open-door policy towards Syrian refugees despite the absence of formal obligation. The UNHCR states that the Lebanese government has never signed the 1951 Refugee Convention which secures a refugee who belongs "to the frontiers of territories where his life or freedom would be threatened on account of his race, religion, nationality, membership of a particular social group or political opinion." Therefore, there exists no international laws which Lebanon must abide by in dealing with the refugees. Adhering to the convention would mean that Lebanon was obligated to provide asylum to refugees and grant refugees the right to access courts, elementary education, and travel documents. Moreover, the refugees are entitles to receive the same public services and treatment in the labor market that Lebanese citizens do. Therefore, when faced with a large quantity of Syrian refugees entering Lebanon, the government had the ability to carry out its goals, which were to return those refugees back to Syria and discourage permanent residence.

Although Syrian refugees began entering Lebanon in 2011, it was not until 2014 that the government began introducing policies regarding Syrian refugee immigration. During the three year open-border policy, an estimated 1.5 million Syrians fled to Lebanon without defined policy or legal framework, leaving many of them with limited options . It is arguable that the establishment of policies regarding Syrians immigrating to Lebanon in 2014 was directly aimed at reducing the number of Syrians migrating to Lebanon, and driving them to return to Syria due to the difficult circumstances. In 2018 Syrian President Bashar al-Assad and Lebanese President Michel Aoun united with the intention "to accelerate [Syrian Refugees] return home".

=== Hostility and prejudice ===
The 29-year Syrian occupation of Lebanon created negative sentiment in the Lebanese people towards Syrians. According to the Human Rights Watch (HRW), the Syrian armed forces detained, without trial, thousands of Lebanese citizens, many of whom not only remained arrested, but were transported to Syrian prisons in violation of international law. Coupled with the kidnapping and assassination of critics to the Syrian regime, what HRW described as a terror campaign, resulted in the Lebanese press censoring any sentiments against Syrian policies in Lebanon. In July 1991 forty supporters of Michel Aoun were arrested in Kesrouan for handing out leaflets that criticized President Hrawi, another fifty-eight were arrested after holding demonstrations in Ashqout to name a few instances. The families of the detained reported that as well as denying legal council and family visitation rights, Syrian forces tortured those imprisoned. This mistreatment of citizens by the Syrian forces only ended as recently as 2005, allowing almost 6 years only before a forced integration of Syrians equivalent to one fourth of the population. The resentment towards Syria is disputed amongst political parties, often debating whether diplomatic and commercial relations between Lebanon and Syria should even be considered.

Negative sentiment from the Lebanese public is not limited to the negative history. In June 2016 a series of deadly suicide bombings occurred in al-Qaa saw causing 5 deaths. This was responded to with raids of refugee camps resulting in 100 arrests, after-which only three people were persecuted, two of which were Syrians with links to the Islamic State of Iraq and the Levant (ISIS). This was a factor leading up to the implementation of curfews in refugee camps. The response to these attacks was negativity to Syrian refugees despite the fact that public deceleration that those charged with the bombing were not refugees. In July of the same year, at least 200 people gathered in Beirut to march against racism towards Syrian refugees. From the ministry of foreign affairs to the interior ministry under the banner "all against racism" demonstrators were met by negative comments by Lebanese citizens due to them supporting Syrian refugees. The willingness to believe that the Syrian refugees bring

There is also a fear of a spillover of the Syrian Civil war into Lebanon which makes citizens unwilling to act as hosts. As early as 2012, the religious fractions that drove the civil war in Syria began to spark assault rifle shootings in open roads and demonstrations including burning tires against the governments willingness to appease Damascus.

The precedent of refugees in Lebanon are the Palestinians. The Palestine Liberation Organization (PLO) was a significant presence in Lebanon and operated in Palestinian refugee camps. From 1968 onward, they carried out military operations against Israel, who would retaliate by conducting raids against Lebanese villages, bringing chaos and destruction to Lebanon. In 1970, following their expulsion from Jordan, the PLO's presence in Lebanon increased and the control they had over parts of the country became more significant. Clashes with the Lebanese army and Christian militias occurred, leading to the involvement of other Lebanese parties and foreign powers that supported the Palestinians, ultimately escalating into the civil war that Syria used to occupy Lebanon. In light of the events, it is not unreasonable for citizens and politicians to be weary of what refugees bring with them, providing a camp could lead to an outcome such as that of Palestinian camps, which are still not under Lebanese jurisdiction to this day.

Despite the reasoning and rationality for any prejudice, the outcome has been alleged and documented mistreatment of Syrian refugees by authorities, through unwarranted arrest, and civilians.

== Refugees in Lebanon ==
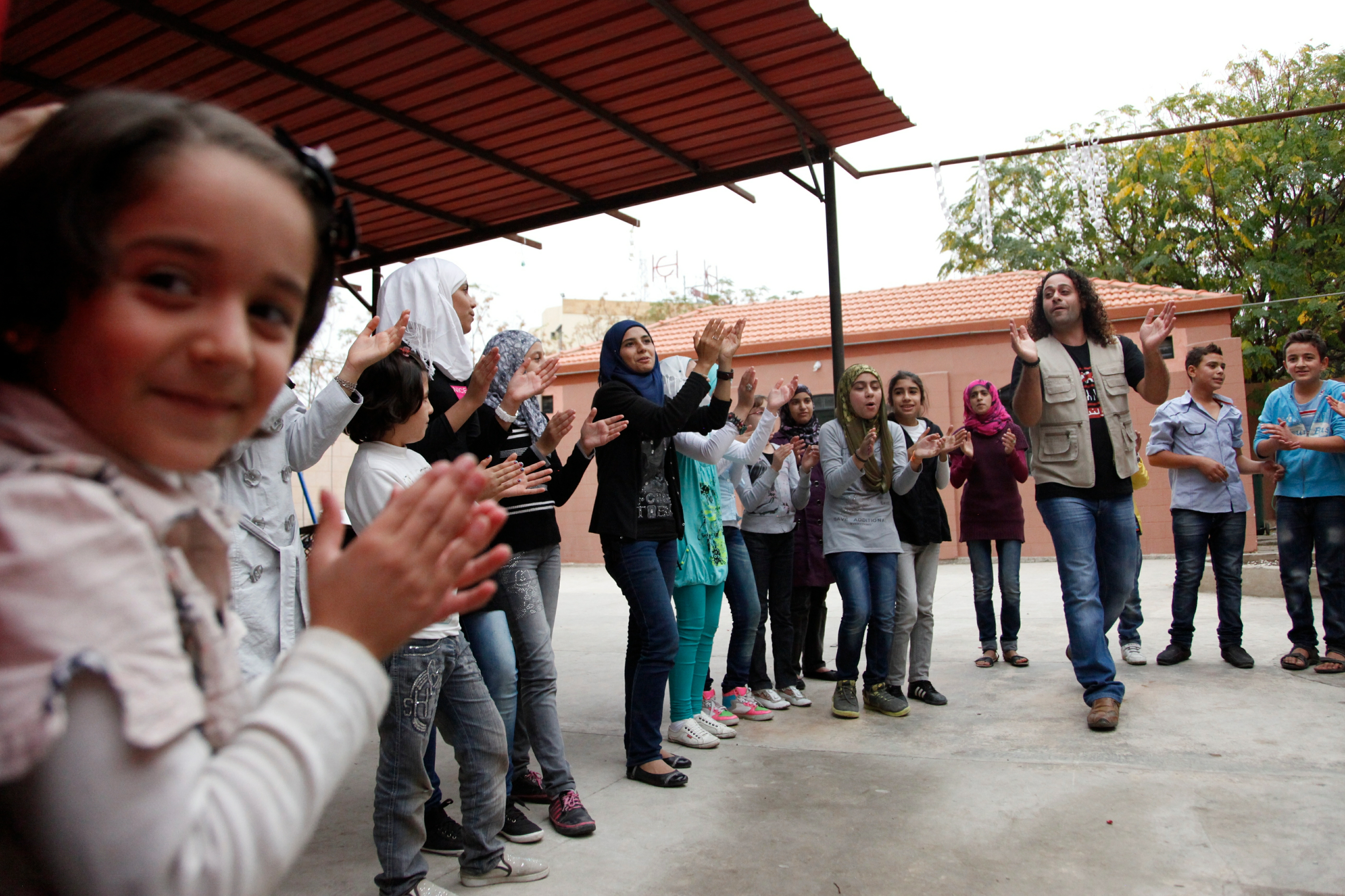
Syrian children in Lebanon (2013)

=== Refugees in Lebanon ===
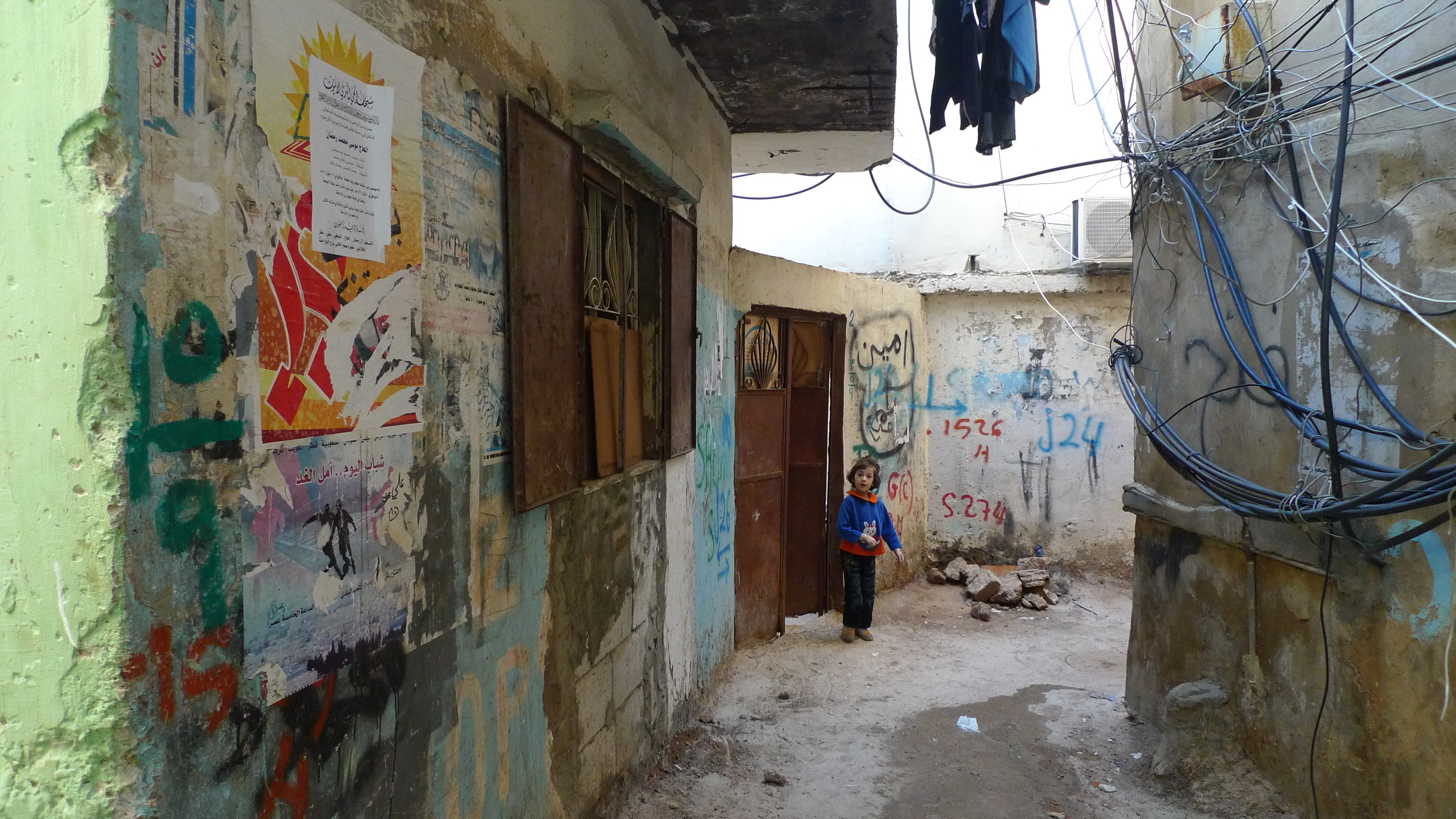
A child in the refugee camp of Bourj el-Barajneh (2011)

Fleeing to Lebanon in 1948 following the Arab-Israel War and having nowhere to return to till present day, as of January 2015, there were 452,669 registered Palestinian refugees in Lebanon. 2010 saw a sudden migration of Palestinian Refugees to Europe from Lebanon, contributing to the European migrant crisis. Palestinian refugees fleeing from Lebanon to European countries has been argued to be a consequence of the migration of Syrian refugees in such large bulk reducing the standard of life and overshadowing them in funding. Palestinian refugees were not welcomed easily, the 1951 Refugee convention was not signed, at least in part, to avoid responsibility of Palestinian refugees in Lebanon, and for Lebanon to maintain the autonomy to decide the actions the government wishes to take regarding displaced persons.

Armenian and Assyrian refugees came to Lebanon in 1915 from present-day southeastern Turkey, following the Armenian and Assyrian genocide. At the time, Mount Lebanon was a Mutasarrifate within the Ottoman Empire that held a unique self-governing status. The Armenian and Assyrian refugees found it as a safe haven given its semi-autonomous state and because of the religious beliefs that they shared with the majority. When Lebanon was formed after Ottoman rule subsided, these Armenians and Assyrians were given citizenship to Lebanon, they are represented in the parliament and have integrated into society in Lebanon.

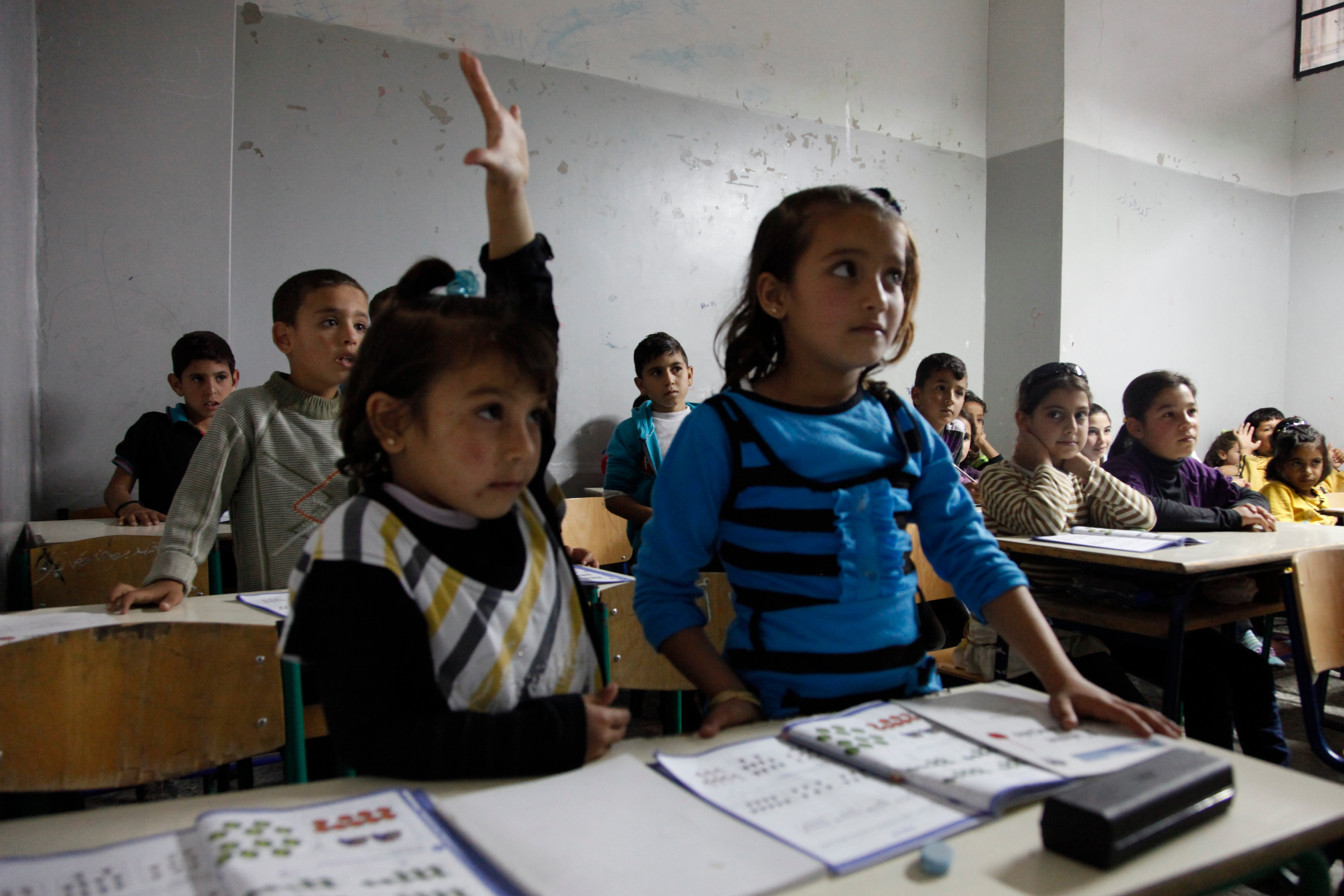
Syrian refugee children in a Lebanese school classroom (2013)

=== Syrian refugees in Lebanon ===
As the numbers of Syrians in Lebanon have grown, so have tensions; the attitude towards reception of Syrians in Lebanon quickly became opposed to. The influx of Syrians into Lebanon has resulted in economic, political, social and religious tensions in Lebanon. Curfews have been put into place in some cities and villages to ensure public safety following attacks on police and members of the military by religious Syrian extremist groups. Many Lebanese citizens fear that there is a possibility of Syrian Civil War spillover in Lebanon, especially after Syrian Sunni Muslim extremist groups executed of Lebanese soldiers in August 2014 as part of the Battle of Arsal.

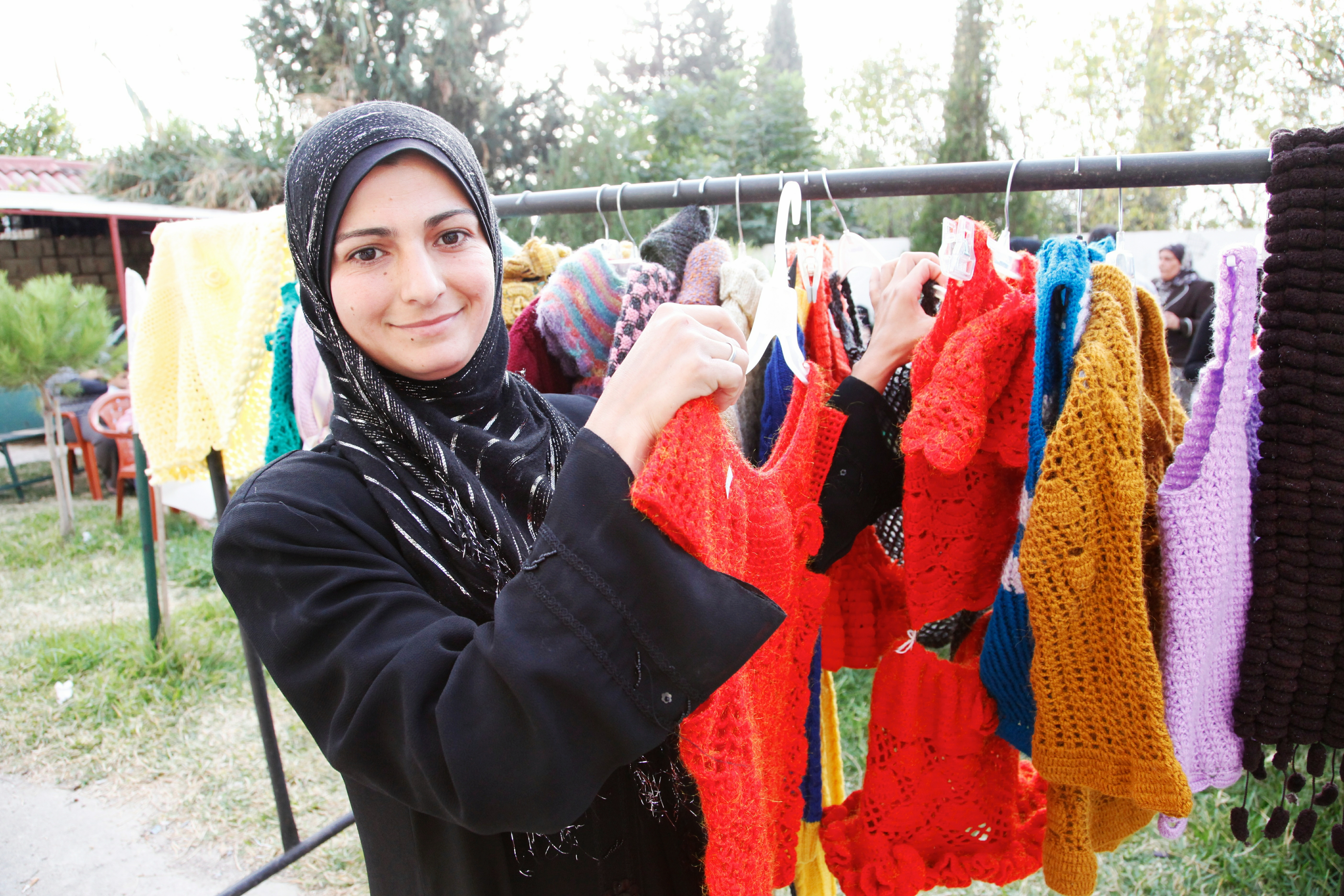
Knitting a brighter future for Syrian refugees in Lebanon (2013)

In the 2017 Lebanon Crisis Response Plan (LCRP) Lebanon makes clear the rights it maintains in light of the influx of Syrian 'refugees',

The UN characterizes the flight of civilians from Syria as a refugee movement, and considers that these Syrians are seeking international protection and are likely to meet the refugee definition. The Government of Lebanon considers that it is being subject to a situation of mass influx. It refers to individuals who fled from Syria into its territory after March 2011 as temporarily displaced individuals, and reserves its sovereign right to determine their status according to Lebanese laws and regulations.

— Government of Lebanon, UN Resident and Humanitarian Coordinator for Lebanon, Lebanon Crisis Response Plan 2017–2020 [EN/AR]

Lebanon maintains its position as not being a state for refugees despite the Palestinian and Armenians residing in the country as displaced individuals. Syrians seeking shelter have been met with a "no camp" policy from the government which lead them to rent cheap land and even rooms in previously existing Palestinian refugee camps.

== Resolution ==
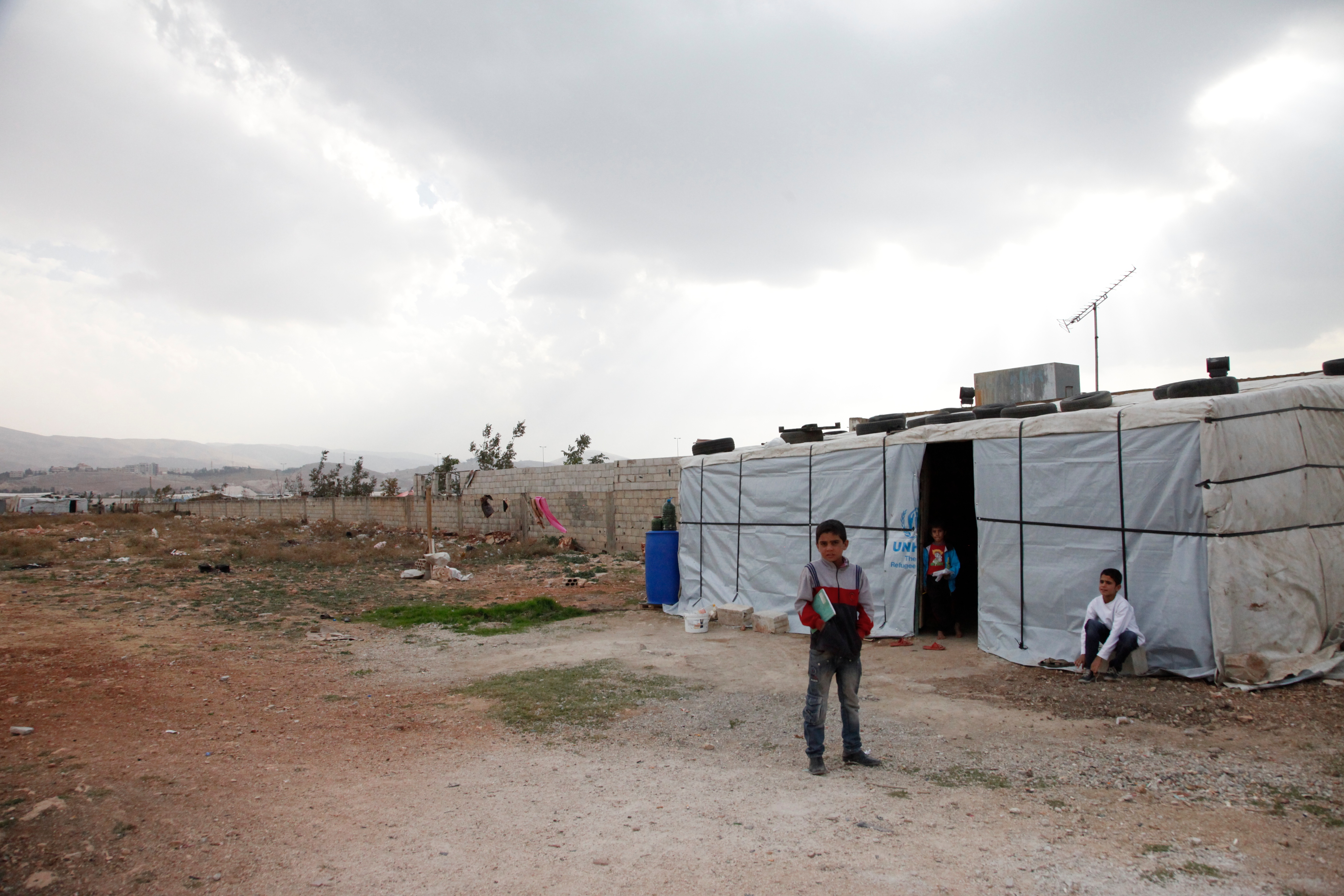
Syrian children outside their temporary home, in the Bekaa Valley (2013)

=== Returning to Syria ===
With Bashar al-Assad regaining support and control, refugees have begun returning to Syria, both individually and with the aid of Damascus. Lebanon urges refugees to return to Syria, claiming that they are unable to accommodate 25% of its population in refugees. The UNHCR advises against the return of Syrian refugees under the circumstances in Syria, this was responded to by a freeze on residency applications for UNHCR staff This approach has led to the argument that Lebanon is beginning to 'force' refugees back to Syria despite the potential danger of doing so.

In 2024, Lebanese Prime Minister Najib Mikati stated that "most" Syrians should be repatriated to safe zones within Syria. The Interior Minister, Bassam Mawlawi, urged for a cap on the number of Syrians in the country, Foreign Minister Abdallah Bou Habib stated that the "crisis of Syrian migrants has spiralled out of control".

In July 2025, the Lebanese government started its 2025 Syrian refugee return plan, along with the UNHCR and the International Organization for Migration (IOM), in order to create suitable solution for the Syrian refugees living in Lebanon. The Organized Voluntary Return Plan aims to help between 200,000 and 400,000 to return to their homes in Syria. The plan is led by Deputy Prime Minister Tarek Mitri and carried out by Lebanon’s General Security.

=== Aid ===
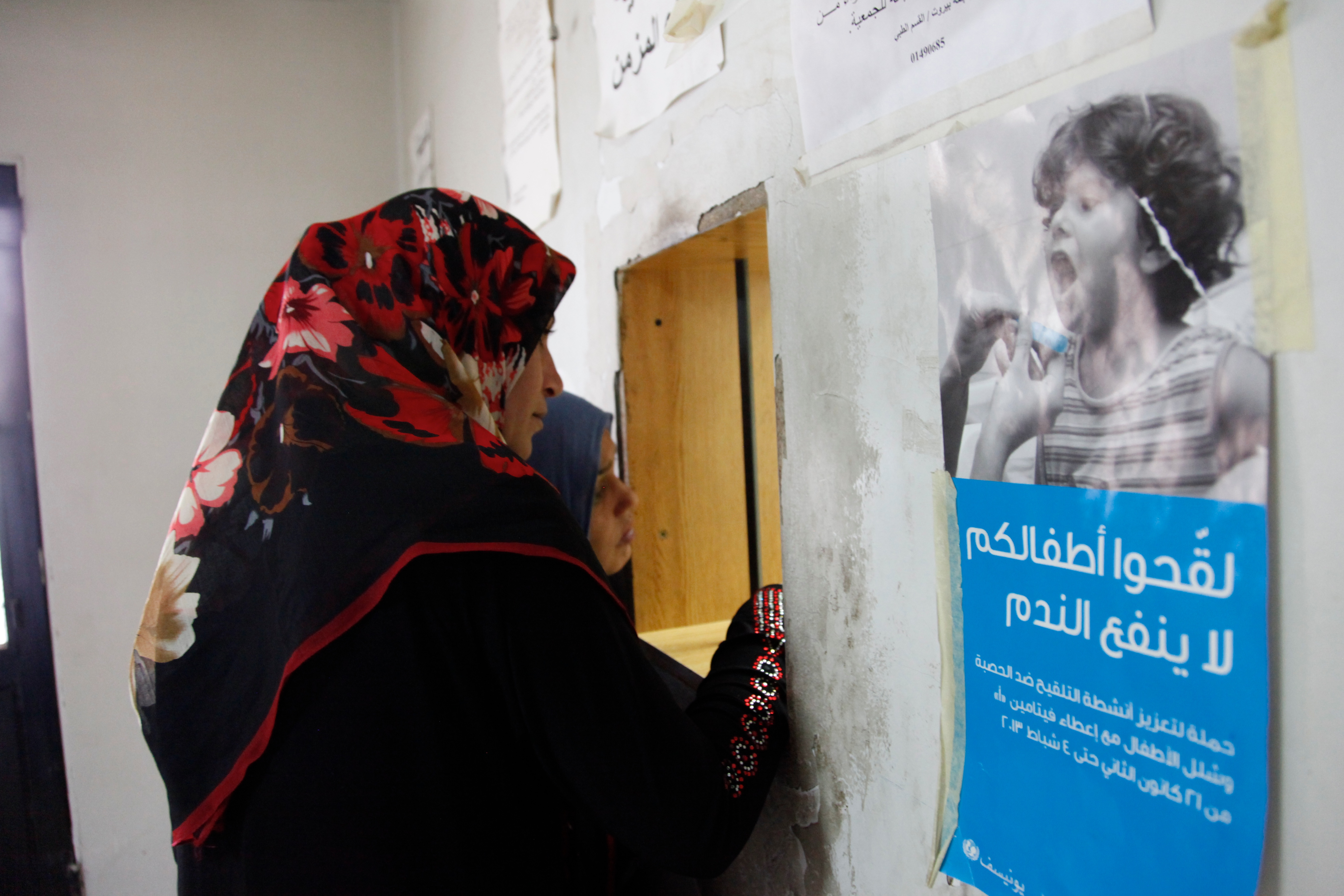
Two Syrian women wait to collect a prescription at a health clinic in Bekaa Valley (2013)

The Lebanese government and NGO's provide assistance to the displaced refugees. Medair, a Swiss NGO, provides aid to Syrian refugees in Lebanon through various means. Housing is supported through distribution of shelter kits and improvements of living conditions for the refugees who have found a place to stay; healthcare, mapping, and hygiene also fall under the contributions of Medair to refugees in Lebanon. Caritas Lebanon is another NGO that aids refugees under the Catholic Church. Providing resources in the form of settlements to over 100 families of Syrian refugees in Lebanon; Caritas navigated the Lebanese governments not permitting formal refugee camps by providing materials that could be added to existing structures to create shelter for the refugees.

Amidst the economic crisis in Lebanon, the European Union faced a surge of refugees entering from Lebanon mainly towards Cyprus. In response, the EU provide €1 billion to the Lebanese government in 2024 for over three years to help prevent a surge of refugees leaving Lebanon into Europe. This sparked outrage among Lebanese as it prompts Syrians to permanently settle in Lebanon. The head of the Lebanese Forces party, Samir Geagea, his party will “continue exerting all efforts until the last illegal migrant leaves Lebanon”.

== Notable people ==
- Henri Pharaoun, former Minister of Foreign Affairs of Lebanon; he designed the Lebanese flag
- Joseph Safra, billionaire banker; he belonged to the Safra family which traces its roots to Aleppo
- David Nahmad, billionaire former art dealer whose family originally came from Aleppo
- Ghassan Tueni, founder of An-Nahar newspaper, and father of Gebran Tueni
- Selim Mouzannar, jeweler
- Hubert Fattal, businessman
- Joe Raad, singer

== See also ==
- Lebanon–Syria relations
- Lebanese people in Syria
- 2025 Syrian refugee return plan (Lebanon)
