= .iq =

Internet country code top-level domain for Iraq

- Introduced: 9 May 1997 (in root zone)
- TLD type: Country code top-level domain
- Status: Active
- Registry: Communications and Media Commission
- Sponsor: Communications and Media Commission
- Intended use: Entities connected with Iraq
- Actual use: Some use in Iraq
- Registration restrictions: The registration of .iq domains is limited to commercial entities, internet service providers, nonprofits, or schools and private institutions recognized by Ministry of Higher Education and Scientific Research, natural individuals, citizens, or residents in Iraq.
- Structure: Mostly third-level domains under .com.iq .gov.iq .edu.iq; a few second-level domains exist.
- Documents: IANA redelegation report
- Registry website: domain.iq

.iq is the Internet country code top-level domain (ccTLD) for Iraq.

This domain was in limbo for several years, as the delegated manager was imprisoned in Texas on charges of alleged connections to Hamas (a State Department designated terrorist organization), for which he was later convicted in 2005. Some talk of redelegation and relaunching began taking place at the time of the 2003 invasion of Iraq, and in 2005 a redelegation to the National Communications and Media Commission of Iraq was approved by ICANN.

Registrations are within these categories:

- .iq – general
- .gov.iq – governmental entities
- .edu.iq – higher education institutions
- .sch.iq – public and private schools
- .com.iq – commercial entities recognised by the Ministry of Trade and/or other relevant authorities
- .mil.iq – military institutions
- .org.iq – non-profit organizations
- .net.iq – network service providers recognised by the Ministry of Trade
- .name.iq – individuals

Whois services can be found at whois.cmc.iq.

== Restrictions ==
The registration of .iq domains is limited to commercial commissions, Internet service providers, nonprofits, or schools and private institutions recognised by the Ministry of Higher Education and Scientific Research, natural individuals, citizens, or residents in Iraq.
