= International Organization for Migration Mission in Ukraine =

International Organization for Migration (IOM) Mission in Ukraine is an official representative office of the International Organization for Migration in the country and is located in its capital city Kyiv.

== History ==
The IOM Mission in Ukraine was established in 1996, when Ukraine became an observer state of IOM. In 1998, IOM launched a Counter Trafficking Program in Ukraine. In 2001, Ukraine requested membership in IOM, which was formalized with the Ukrainian Parliament's ratification in 2002. Since January 2010, IOM Ukraine's Mission is headed by German lawyer Mr. Manfred Profazi.

== IOM activities in Ukraine ==
=== Combating human trafficking ===
Ukraine is a country of origin, transit and destination for trafficking in men, women and children. Internal trafficking is also a growing problem. According to a research commissioned by IOM, over 120,000 Ukrainians became victims to human trafficking since 1991, which makes Ukraine one of the largest "suppliers" of slave labour in Europe.

The IOM Ukraine Counter Trafficking (CT) Programme was launched in 1998, with a strategy to support government and civil society efforts to combat trafficking in human beings and to ensure victims’ access to assistance and justice. IOM follows a holistic and multi-disciplinary approach to tackle the problem of human trafficking, working in four interrelated areas:

- Prevention and advocacy
- Prosecution and Criminalization
- Protection and Reintegration
- Partnership is the basis of all of IOM's counter-trafficking efforts.

=== Migration management ===
IOM is assisting the Ukrainian Government to develop a comprehensive migration management system by enhancing its capacity to manage migration flows, in line with the EU-Ukraine dialogue on migration. IOM works with the State Migration Service of Ukraine, the State Border Guard Service of Ukraine (SBGS), and the Ministry of Internal Affairs of Ukraine, as well as civil society, to institutionalize best practices in the field of migration management.

Since the end of 2013, IOM has been acting as the implementing partner of the European Union Border Assistance Mission to Moldova and Ukraine (EUBAM), an advisory, technical body mandated to enhance the border management capacities of the border guard and customs authorities and other state agencies of Moldova and Ukraine.

=== Migration and development ===
The global strategy of the International Organization for Migration envisages promoting migrants’ wellbeing, supporting integration of national minorities and strengthening the role of migrants in the development of their host countries and the countries of origin. IOM has been assisting the Government of Ukraine in harnessing the development potential of labour migration for the benefit of individual migrants, their communities and the Ukrainian society.

=== Promoting cultural diversity and integration of migrants ===
Responding to an increase in the number of suspected racially motivated attacks in Ukraine beginning in 2006, the IOM, United Nations High Commissioner for Refugees (UNHCR), Amnesty International and other concerned civil society organizations formed the Diversity Initiative (DI) in 2007, to address the issue in a coordinated way.

DI is a voluntary cooperation platform, which strives to uphold the human dignity and well-being of migrants, refugees and visible minorities in Ukraine. It currently includes over 65 organizations from the international, civil, corporate, and Government sectors as well as diplomatic missions and interested individuals (see http://diversipedia.org.ua).

Find more on Promoting cultural diversity and integration of migrants

=== Migration Health Services and Travel Assistance ===
==== Migration Health Services ====
Health assessments are IOM Ukraine's largest migration health service, made for the purpose of resettlement, international employment, enrolment in specific migrant assistance programs, or for obtaining a temporary or permanent visa. Currently IOM Ukraine performs health assessments for Australia, Canada, New Zealand, the United States of America and the United Kingdom.

==== Travel and Reintegration Assistance ====
The IOM Mission in Ukraine assists migrants enrolled in a number of resettlement programmes, facilitates relocation of Ukrainian citizens from conflict zones and fosters reintegration of Ukrainians voluntarily returning from Europe and Canada.

=== Assisting Displaced Persons and the Affected Communities ===
In response to the humanitarian crisis and mass displacement in Ukraine, IOM started assisting vulnerable internally displaced persons (IDPs), mainly women, children and the elderly, in summer 2014. Being supported by Germany, the U.S., the UN, Norway and Switzerland, as of January 2015, the programme is active in 16 regions of Ukraine, which host over 70 per cent of the displaced persons in the country.

Main components include:

- Community stabilization and development initiatives in displacement and return areas supporting host communities and IDPs to develop, implement and sustain socially beneficial projects.
- Training and providing grants to IDPs to support their livelihoods, through small business set-up, self-employment, and professional courses.
- Providing timely information to and raising the awareness of IDPs and other interested parties on return areas via a dedicated hotline.
- Technical support to assist the Government of Ukraine in its response to the crisis, in part through improving the implementation of the IDP registration system and data management.

Find more on Assisting Displaced Persons and the Affected Communities.
