= Qabeit =

Qabeit قبعيت
- Village
- Qabeit in Lebanon
- Coordinates: 34°26′58″N 36°05′46″E
- Country: Lebanon
- Governorate: Akkar
- District: Akkar
- Elevation: 750 m (2,460 ft)

Qabeit, also Qabaait or Kabiit (Arabic: قبعيت, romanized: Qabʿayt), is a village in the Akkar District of Akkar Governorate, Lebanon. The village is situated in the Akkar highlands, and its population is predominantly Sunni Muslims.

== Geography ==
Located in the Akkar highlands, Qabeit is noted for its panoramic views. Due to its elevation and position, its vantage points are reported to overlook the Mediterranean coast, the surrounding Lebanese mountains, and the plains of neighboring Syria. The local geography includes rivers and forested areas.

== Demographics and Diaspora ==
Qabeit has a large and active diaspora, with a significant community based in Australia. The village is known for a high number of residents with university diplomas, particularly in scientific fields. A large number of residents also serve in the Lebanese Army.

Like other municipalities in the Akkar Governorate, the village has hosted a large population of Syrian refugees since the onset of the Syrian Civil War.

== Economy and Infrastructure ==
The village is characterized by a high standard of development, including many modern homes. This development is largely attributed to remittances from the diaspora community. Qabeit is also noted for its well-maintained road network.

== History ==
In September 2012, the village received media attention when a boat carrying asylum-seekers, including 17 people from the Qabeit area, sank off the coast of Australia.

The village and its surrounding pine forests are sometimes affected by seasonal wildfires, which are often combatted by the Lebanese Army.
