= Nahrain University =

Public university in Baghdad, Iraq

Coordinates: 33.278°N 44.376°E

- جامعة النهرين
- Motto: وقل رب زدني علما [O Lord, Increase my Knowledge]
- Type: Public
- Established: 1987
- President: Mohammed Sahib Mahdi Saleh Al-Tai
- Location: Baghdad, Iraq
- Campus: Urban
- Website: nahrainuniv.edu.iq

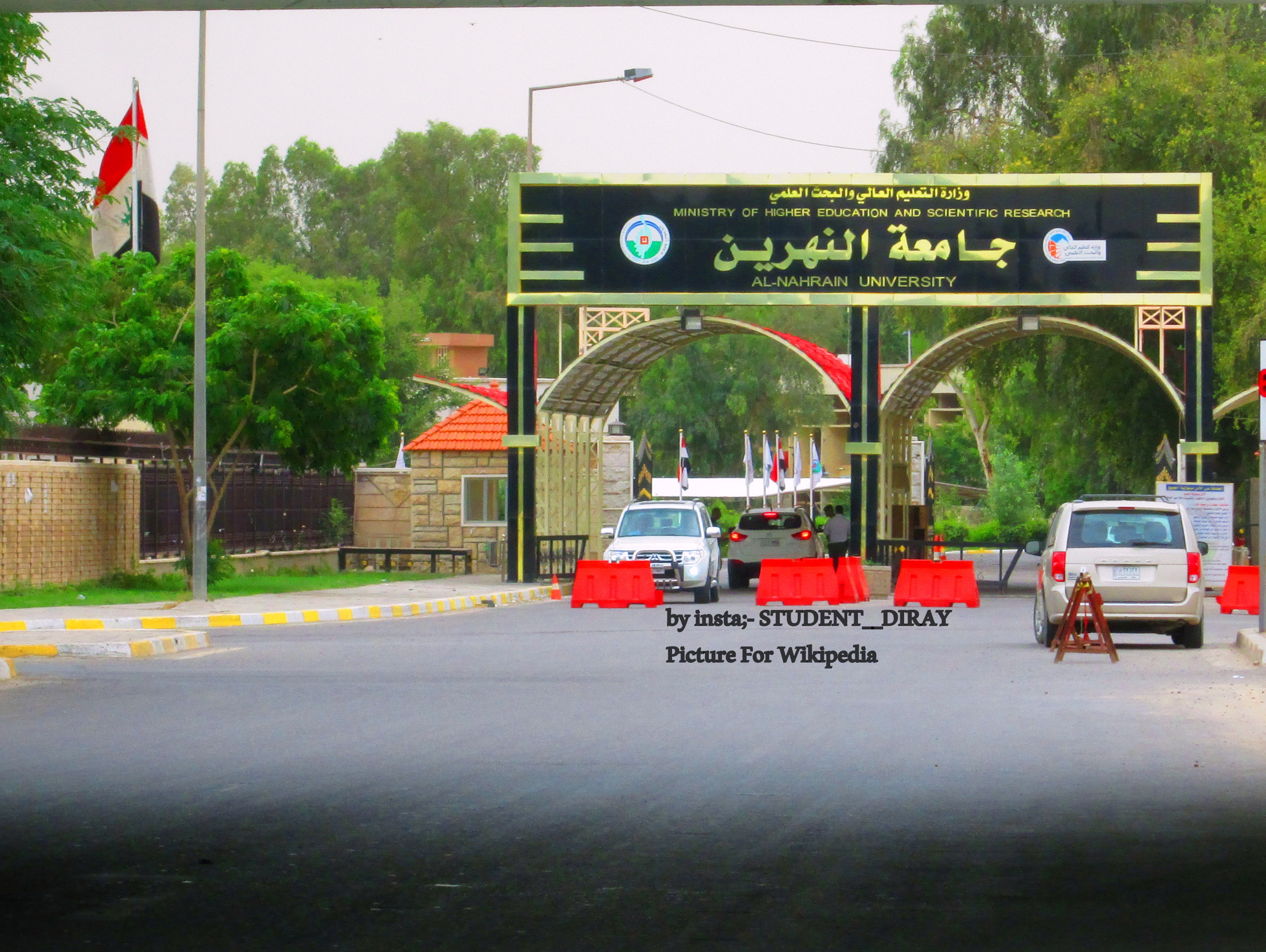
Nahrain University Entrance

Nahrain University (Arabic: جامعة النهرين), also known as Al-Nahrain University, is a coeducational public university established in 1987 and located in Baghdad, Iraq. The university offers undergraduate and postgraduate education as well as research opportunities. From 1987 to the 2003 Invasion of Iraq, the university was known as Saddam University which was then changed to its current name "Nahrain" meaning The Two Rivers (as in the two rivers of Iraq: Tigris and Euphrates).

== Overview ==
With two campuses in central Baghdad, Nahrain University is widely viewed as one of the best universities in Iraq due to its strict admission requirements, updated curricula, and relatively better educational equipment.

The university's stated mission is to prepare scientific cadres for the development of intellectual thinking in Iraq and create its future generation of leaders and think tanks. Until 2005, Nahrain had a special admission process that included a rigorous IQ admission exam followed by an admissions committee interview. Thus, very few students were annually admitted and lectures had as little as 20 students per class.

Nahrain was considered as a private-governmental university since 1988 because it was not under the Public University System of the Ministry of Higher Education and Scientific Research but rather had its own independent university system directly funded and partially controlled by the Office of the President of the Republic of Iraq.

However, in 2007, Iraqi President Jalal Talabani signed a law that officially transferred Nahrain University to the authority of the Ministry of Higher Education and Scientific Research. To comply with the Public University System, Nahrain had to remove its special admission requirements, change its system to a regular year-based academic year (Fall and Spring only), and eliminate the five year joint bachelor's and master's degree program. Many Iraqi academics protested the decision since Nahrain's system was the most unusual in the country and considered the change a big loss for the Iraqi higher education system.

University rankings

Global – Overall
- QS World: 951-1000 (2026)

The university was the first in the country to implement a semester-based academic year and provide student the option to earn a joint bachelor's and master's degree in five years. In addition, Nahrain's Information Engineering College was the first academic institute to offer information engineering studies in Iraq.

Currently, Nahrain still praises itself to be Iraq's best higher education institute in terms of the level of scientific and academic research, and the systematic and self-discipline.

== Colleges ==
- College of Medicine
- College of Engineering
- College of Science
- College of Information Engineering
- College of Political Science
- College of Law
- College of Business Economics

== Campuses ==
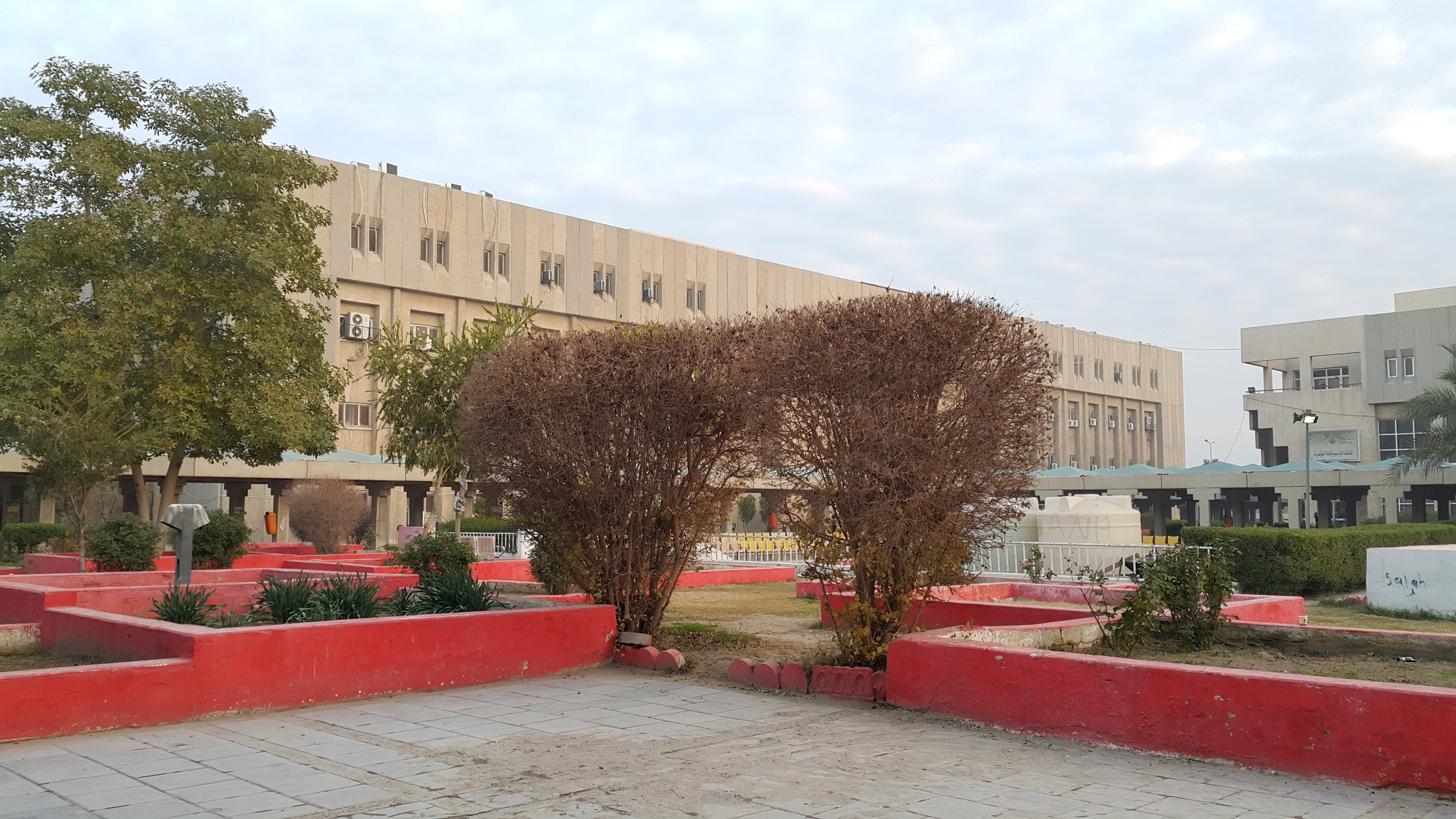

Nahrain University has two main campuses. The first is in Al-Jadriya in Baghdad, Iraq adjacent to the University of Baghdad main campus. Nahrain's smaller and second campus is in Kadhimiya also in Baghdad.

Al-Jadriya complex contains:

- College of Engineering
- College of Information Engineering
- College of Science
- College of Political Science
- The Institute for Biotechnology Research
- College of Business and Economics
- The Central Library
- Office of the President

Kadhimiya complex contains:

- College of Medicine
- College of Law
- College of Pharmacy
- The Institute for Embryology & Sterility Research

== Notable alumni ==
- Ahmed Albasheer, television presenter, comedian and satirist

== See also ==
- List of universities in Iraq
