= Unknown to No One =

Iraqi band

UTN1 or (Unknown To No One)
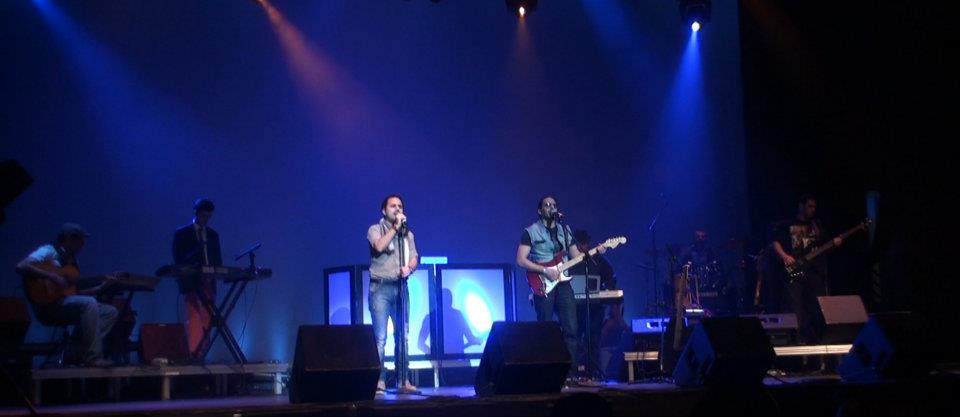
- At Lincoln Theater

Background information
- Origin: Iraq
- Genre: Pop/Rock
- Years active: 1999–present
- Labels: LCIE, Melody TV Music and currently unsigned
- Members: Akhlad Raof; Shant Garabedian; Hassan Ali Al-Falluji; tour members : Muhanned ozzi Samer Farif; Yousif Ismail
- Past members: Diyar Dullari (2002-2003); Nadeem Hamid (2000-2009); Art Haroutunian (1999-2011); Marwan Sameer (2012-2014)
- Website: http://www.utn1.com

UTN1 or Unknown to No One is one of the first Iraqi pop/rock bands formed in 1999 in Baghdad, Iraq, moved to Beirut in 2005. It is notable for being a pioneering group that sings in both Arabic and English, and for being formed under Saddam Hussein's regime. It was founded by Shant Garabedian and Artin Haroutunian. They were later joined by Hassan Ali Al-Falluji, Akhlad Raof, Artin Haroutunian who left the band in 2011 due to his decision to live in Holland. Marwan Sameer (Pianist/Keyboardist) joined in 2012 and left 2014.

== Pre-2003 Invasion ==
The brainchild of Art (Artin) and Shant, the group was originally formed in 1999, during the last years of Saddam Hussein's presidency. The duo dared to form a pop band where few had the courage to do so. They found the resources to produce their first demo song, with limited sound engineering devices. They eventually advertised for vocalists and recruited the other three members into the band - Hassan who answered the advertisement running on the local radio "Voice of Youth". Then Hassan's cousin Akhlad and a third friend Nadeem joined and formed UTN1or Unknown to No One .

They used to compose music on a keyboard, which they left in the trunk of their Volkswagen Passat. The vehicle was also their rehearsal stage beside band members' houses. During that time they also wrote and composed some original songs, and for them to get any airtime on the local radio, they had to compose a song for Saddam's Birthday. The song, having a nice catchy tune to it, was aired on the VOY FM more than twice every hour during the public celebratory times of his birthday.

The band released its first single entitled Fancy Girl, a love song. Alan Enwia, an Assyrian Christian music record store owner, offered to produce an album for them. Lacking any professional support, they independently managed to have eight songs recorded within a limited budget. The album found appeal with youth that started buying their debut album in display at the music record store. They managed to sell more than 2000 copies in 2002.

After the Iraqi war, Iraq's first ever Western boy band created big media interest and its members were interviewed with by the BBC, CNN and Associated Press. British producers offered to produce a demo album which they finished in 2002 entitled FROM NOW ON.

== Post-2003 Invasion ==
After the war broke out, the boys lost momentum at home but soon were featured in Western news programs achieving some stardom. A British talent searcher, Peter Whitehead, promised to promote their music, but he failed to secure a visa for the group to travel to England. The boys experienced bitter disappointment. But with the old regime gone, new hope emerged for the pop group as people became more and more interested in Iraq's only boy band.

2004 they signed a contract with a production company that moved them to Jordan and then London where they recorded While We Can their first international song, which talks about the situation in Iraq.

2006 They moved to Lebanon to start a career in the Middle East. They prepared and recorded their new English album in 2007 and they recorded the first Arabic hit song Jamila which it was released on 19 December 2007. It was one of the most popular songs in the Lebanese charts in late 2007. It had airplay throughout the Arab World.

May 2008, The band released their third single (the 2nd one in Arabic) under the title Lughat Al-Ayn which also reached number 1 on the Lebanese charts, and it was the door to get a sponsorship to record and finish their album that they worked on since 2006, the sponsor is an Arabic Channel called Al Aan TV. They were interested on them because their target it is the Iraqi Audience and they saw that the UTN1 is a good example for an Iraqi youth group that can represent the Iraqi youth in the outside (Arabic and Western world)

Music videos have been prepared for all 3 singles that they released. The band also sang a popular support song for the Iraqi National Team in soccer and was featured on "Iraq Star 3" on Al Sumaria TV.

Summer 2009, They released their single "Alaan Ahibik Akthar" الان احبك اكثرthat was produced by Alaan TV, the songs was made for the Channel as an appreciation for the sponsorship for the band in 2008/2009

2010, they released their video clip of their song "Tatazakarein" تتذكرين, this video was produced by UTN1 from their album of the same name. In the same year they also released One Last Time.

December 2011', released their video clip of the song "Salam Shabab" بدي قول Produced and Directed by a Lebanese Director "Ruby Malek" who did her first video with the band UTN1. The clip was shot in the streets of New York and made a big success in the Middle East. The clip hit "number 1" in many TVs specially at "Alsumaria Top Ten"

May 2013, released their video clip of the song "Salam Shabab" سلام شباب Produced by USIP Directed by "Yasser Munem" .The clip was shot in Washington, D.C., and Baghdad.

January 2015 Released a number single Mur Biyya which topped the charts in Many Arab Countries and became their commercial success after the Jamila and Loghat al Ain, The music video was shot in Washington DC

June 2017 Released a rock single called Majnoon which was composed by the band.

August 2018Released a rearranged version of Indian/Assyrian Version of the song Ta Mini which was sung By Kuwaity band Samar during the 80s and the song was written in Arabic under the name ( Hayati )

October 2020 The Band Released A new version of the Iraqi National Anthem ( Mawtini ) for the first Anniversary of Iraqs October revolution that broke-out in October 2019.

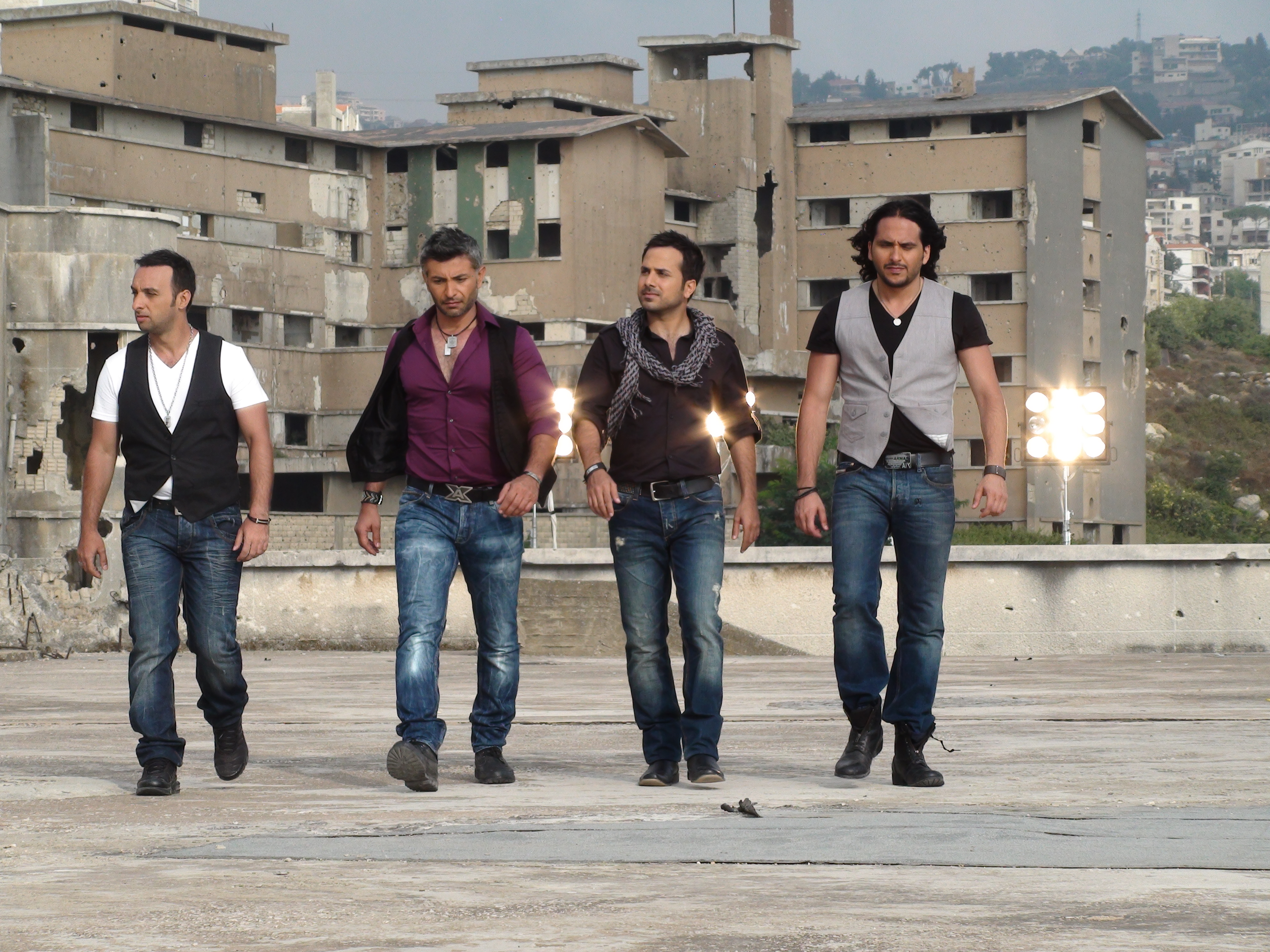

== Discography ==
=== Albums ===
- 2002: From Now On released in Iraq only
- 2007: Jamila ( جميلة )
- 2010: Tatazakarein ( تتذكّرين )
- 2010:One Last Time

=== Singles ===
- "While We Can" 2006 ( طالما نستطيع )
- "Jamila" 2007 ( جميلة Beautiful )
- "Loughat El Ayn" 2008( لغة العين Language of the Eye )
- "Ala'an Ahibik Akthar" 2009 (Now I love you more الآن احبك اكثر) a.k.a. Bint Al Yom (Today's Girl بنت اليوم)
- U2's "One" cover 2010
- "Tetdhakareen" 2010 (Do you remember تتذكرين)
- "Baddi Oul " 2012 ( I wanna say بدي قول)
- "Salam Shabab " 2013
- "Mur Biyya " Feb. 2015 (مر بيه)
- "Edi 3ala Galby " Aug. 2015 (ايدي على قلبي)
- "Alek Asaal " July 2016 ( عليك أسأل )
- "Majnoon " June 2017 ( مجنون )
- "Hayati " August 2018 ( حياتي )
- "Ma wefet " Feb 2019 ( ما وفيت )
- "Mawtini " October 2020 ( موطني )
- "Ghali " April 2021 ( غالي )
- "Helwa " July 2021 ( حلوة )

== Band members ==
Unknown to No One’s band members represent different ethnic and religious groups in Iraq:

- Shant Garabedian - vocals and drums.
- Hassan Ali Al-Falluji - vocals and guitars.
- Akhlad Raof - vocals, Keyboards and harmonica.
- Art Haroutiounian - vocals and keyboards.

Tour Musicians:

- Rafi Agob - keyboards.
- Samer Farid - keyboards.
- Zack O'Brien(Ozzie) - Bass guitar
- Yousif Ismail - Spanish guitar

Ex Members:

- Diyar Dullair - vocals (joined 2001 left 2004).
- Nadeem Hamed - vocals (joined 2000 left 2009).
- Marwan Sameer - Keyboards (joined 2012 left 2015).
