= Hussam Al-Rassam =

Iraqi singer (born 1978)

Hussam Al Rassam
- Born: 29 March 1978 (age 47); Hilla, Iraq
- Genres: Pop
- Occupation: Singer-songwriter
- Years active: 2001–present
- Website: http://www.hussamalrassam.com

Hussam Al Rassam (Arabic: حسام الرسام; born 29 March 1978) is an Iraqi singer and actor who has become a known singer post the 2003 Iraq war.

He started his career as a singer fairly young but did not have much success until later in life with his album Al Qodwwd Alhalbiya. After a successful single, he started to sing for free in the hunting club to gain popularity, and rumors indicates that he was singing in parties held by wives of senior Iraqi officials and figures especially ((wedad al-orfily)), Al-Rassam and recorded new singles based on poems. One such single was made by Al Rassam featuring three other Iraqi singers for the Iraq national football team, Jeeb El Kass which in English means bring the trophy/cup. It became the official song for the team and was played when Iraq won the 2007 Asian Cup.
