= Fareed Lafta =

Iraqi pilot and athlete

Fareed Lafta (Arabic: فريد لفتة) is an Iraqi pilot and athlete, and has appeared in Guinness World Records for participating in the first skydive above Mount Everest.

== Guinness World Records ==
Largest flag flown whilst skydiving by Fareed, according to Guinness World Records, Whilst parachuting over the Skydive Chicago facility in Ottawa, Illinois, USA, Fareed flew an Iraq flag measuring 1,226.27 m^{2} (13,199.49 ft^{2}). As well Fareed flew in a lawn chair suspended by helium-filled party balloons over central Oregon, USA.

Lawn chair balloon flight cancelled early.

Due to thunderstorms and winds Fareed and Kent Couch faced a loss due to end of flight which failed the plan of taking off out of Oregon to Montana, the two lawn - chairs were attached 350 helium balloons. The flight almost travelled around 30 miles (48 km.) at an altitude of 10,000 feet (3048 metres) from the start point in the north east.

== Peace and Sport Forum ==
At the Peace and Sport Forum (Dubai), Under the guidance of Fareed, he and his team create world's largest symbol of peace out of buttons, also hundreds of volunteers from all around the world got together to send a Peace message from Dubai.
