= Salim al-Jabouri =

4th Speaker of the Council of Representatives of Iraq

- سليم الجبوري
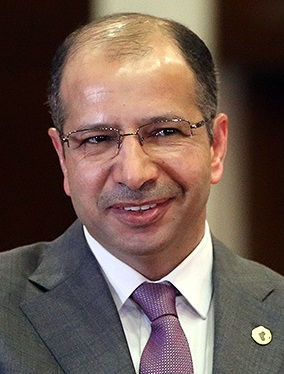
- Al-Jabouri in 2018

4th Speaker of the Council of Representatives
- In office 15 July 2014 – 1 July 2018
- President: Fuad Masum
- Preceded by: Usama al-Nujayfi
- Succeeded by: Mohamed Al Halbusi

Personal details
- Born: August 12, 1971 (age 55) Muqdadiya, Ba'athist Iraq
- Party: Muttahidoon
- Education: Nahrain University

Salim Abdullah al-Jabouri (Arabic: سليم عبدالله الجبوري; born 12 August 1971) is an Iraqi politician who was elected as the Speaker of the Iraqi Parliament on 15 July 2014 until 1 July 2018.

Al-Jabouri now holds the position of president of Iraqi Parliament starting from 2014.

Al-Jabouri is a Sunni Arab from Muqdadiya, Diyala Governorate who obtained a doctorate in law in 2001. He worked as a law professor at Nahrain University in Baghdad.

He was originally a member of the Iraqi Islamic Party. He was elected to the Council of Representatives of Iraq in December 2005 for the Iraqi Accord Front list and he became deputy head of parliament's legal committee. Two of his brothers, Fuad and Ahmed al-Jabouri, were killed in an attack in 2007 in Muqdadiya.

He stood in Diyala in the March 2010 general election but the Iraqi Accord Front failed to have any MPs elected from that province. However, he defected to the Iraqiya list and was nominated to parliament in December 2010 as a replacement MP. He headed the parliament's Human Rights Committee, where he accused the government of Nouri al Maliki of torturing detainees. In 2011, the Iraqi newspaper Al-Sabah al-Jadid quoted sources saying an arrest warrant had been issued for him on charges of terrorism. The al Sabah newspaper reported at the same time that the Higher Judicial Council had asked the parliament to lift his immunity. In March 2014 he was targeted by a roadside bomb which killed two of his bodyguards.

He was elected in the 2014 general election on the "Diyala is Our Identity Coalition", a predominantly Sunni Arab list which won 5 out of 14 seats and is part of a wider alliance with the Muttahidoon party of former speaker Osama al-Nujaifi. His election was initially approved by the Independent High Electoral Commission on the grounds that they had "serious crime cases" pending against him. However, he was acquitted by the Federal Supreme Court and allowed to take his seat.

After the election he was selected by the Sunni Arab MPs as their candidate for the speakership, following the Muhassasah convention adopted in Iraq whereby the speaker is always a Sunni Arab, the Prime Minister always a Shi'ite Arab and the President a Kurd. Al-Jabouri won 194 votes, a majority of the 328 MPs as required under the constitution.
