= Manfred Profazi =

Manfred Profazi is the Senior Regional Advisor for Europe and Central Asia at the International Organization for Migration (IOM) Headquarters in Geneva, Switzerland since September 2017.

== Biography ==
Before his current assignment, Mr. Profazi was the Chief of Mission of the IOM Mission in Ukraine from 2010 to 2017. Previous to that, he served as the Executive Officer and in other functions at IOM Indonesia between 2006 and 2009. Prior to that, Mr. Profazi worked for 3 years as a Programme Manager for IOM in Kabul, Afghanistan.

Before that, he was the Head of Office and Operations Coordinator of IOM's Liaison Office in Berlin. He started his career with IOM as a consultant and later research assistant at the IOM Headquarters in Geneva, Switzerland.

Prior to joining IOM in 1997, Mr. Profazi worked as a consultant at the German Institute for Economic Research (Deutsches Institut fuer Wirtschaftsforschung, DIW) in Berlin, Germany and at the International Centre for Migration Policy Development (ICMPD) in Vienna, Austria.

A German National, he received his master's degree in Political Science, with an emphasis on Migration and International Relations at the Free University of Berlin, Germany. He has conducted research on international labour migration, migration potentials, migration history and theories.
