= Joe Raad =

Joe Raad جو رعد
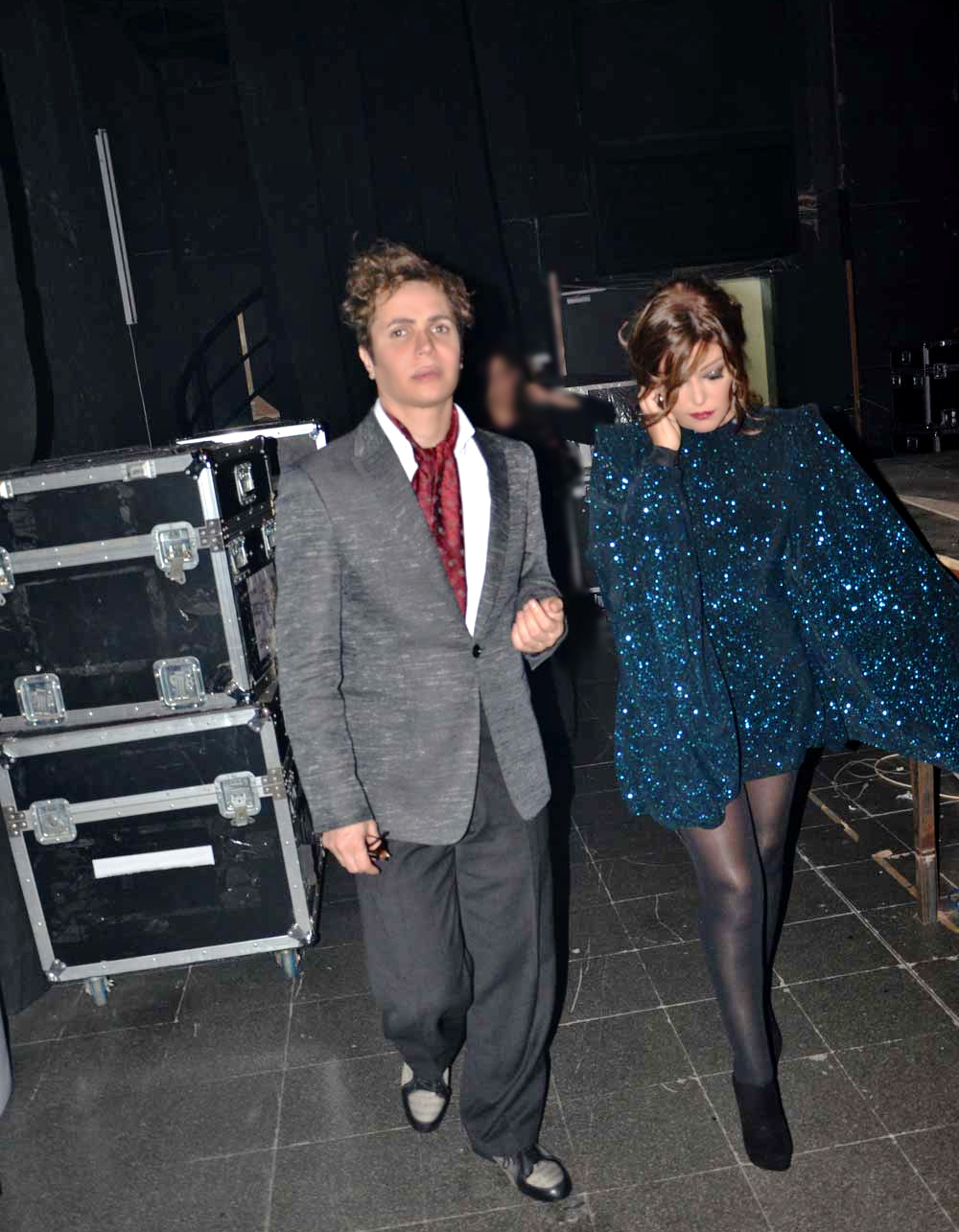

Background information
- Born: Jawdat Raad; February 4, 1985 (age 41)
- Origin: Aleppo, Syria
- Occupations: Musician, composer, singer, music director, songwriter
- Years active: 2008–present
- Labels: Platinum Records and "Joe Raad The Singer"
- Website: http://joeraadthesinger.com/

Joe Raad (Arabic: جو رعد; born February 4, 1985, in Beirut) is a Lebanese singer, composer, music director, and songwriter of Syrian descent.

== Discography ==
=== Studio albums ===
- 2007: Malawe
- 2008: Berohl
- 2012: Talei
- 2014: Nazra Minnak
- 2015: Aayb Aalli Byaamel Aayb
- 2015: Ana Bachhadlak
- 2016: Wesh Endak
- 2017: Mastah

=== Live albums ===
- 2014: Nazra Minnak
- 2015: Aayb Aalli Byaamel Aayb
- 2015: Ana Bachhadlak
- 2016: Wesh Endak
- 2017: Mastah
- 2018: Hobbak Backwashni
- 2018: Habib Mawzati
