= Communications and Media Commission (Iraq) =

- هيئة الإعلام والاتصالات
- Coat of arms of Iraq

Agency overview
- Formed: 2004
- Type: Independent
- Jurisdiction: Government of Iraq
- Headquarters: Baghdad (Iraq)
- Agency executives: Nawfal Abu Ragheef, Chairman; Baleegh Abu Kalal, CEO
- Website: cmc.iq

The Communications and Media Commission (CMC; Arabic: هيئة الإعلام والإتصالات) is a financially and administratively independent government agency established in 2004 to monitor media and communications in Iraq. CMC is attached to the Council of Representatives.

== See also ==
- .iq
- Ministry of Communications (Iraq)
