= Achmed Khammas =

German writer

Achmed Adolf Wolfgang Khammas
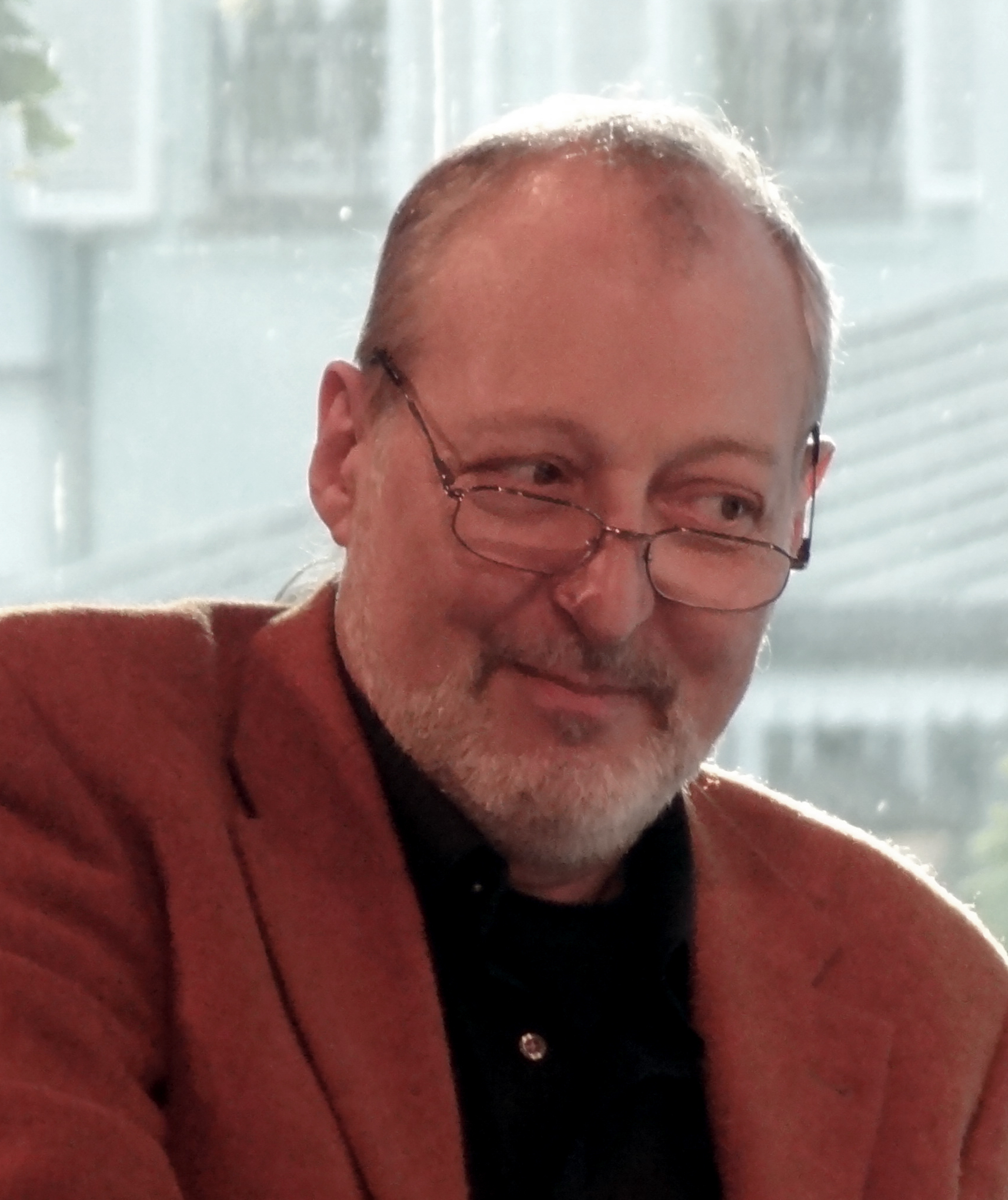
- Achmed Khammas in 2012
- Born: Berlin, Germany
- Website: www.khammas.de

Achmed Adolf Wolfgang Khammas (born March 23, 1952) is a German author, translator and interpreter. He is most popular for being one of the very few authors to write about Islam and science fiction in the Arabic language. Khammas is also active in the field of sustainable energy.

== Early life ==
Khammas was born in Berlin in 1952 to a German mother and Iraqi father. He grew up in Damascus, Syria. After attending school there he returned to Berlin to work at Technische Universität Berlin. Shortly later he moved back to Damascus where he built up a factory for the production of solar thermal plants, between the years of 1977 and 1989. Since then, he has been back in Berlin and working as a translator and interpreter.

== Bibliography ==
- Der Wettbewerb ("The competition")
- 2007 - Buch der Synergie ("Book of synergy")
