= Hind Kamel =

Iraqi actress and film director

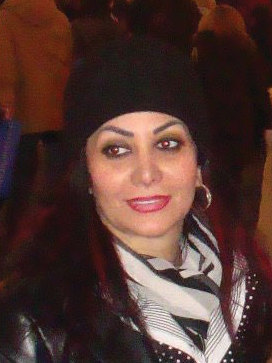
- Born: Hind Kamel Al Shendi; August 21, 1961 (age 64); Baghdad, Kingdom of Iraq
- Occupation: Actress/Film Director
- Years active: 1978–present
- Spouse: Faisal AL-Yasri

Hind Kamel (Arabic; هند كامل) is an (Born August 21, 1961), Iraqi actress and film director.

Born in Baghdad, Kamel got a Bachelor of Arts from the Academy of Fine Arts in Baghdad in 1984. She rose to fame as an actress between the eighties and nineties across Iraq and the Persian Gulf region, in particular, Kuwait, Saudi Arabia, Qatar and the United Arab Emirates. She now resides in Jordan.

== Filmography ==
- The Mirror - Television series (1984)
- Computer wife (1985)
- Flaming borders - Sana (1986)
- The smell of coffee - Rasqia (1986)
- Babel, my Love - Amira (1987)
