= Farah Alhaddad =

Iraqi fashion model (born 1997)

- Born: Farah Alhaddad; May 5, 1997 (age 29); Diyala Governorate, Iraq
- Occupation: Model
- Years active: 2015
- Modeling information
- Height: 1.61 m (5 ft 3 1/2 in)
- Hair color: Brown
- Eye color: Green

Farah Alhaddad (Arabic: فرح الحداد; born 5 May 1997) is an Iraqi fashion model. She was the Miss Middle East in 2018.

== Awards and nominations ==
- Miss Middle East 2018
- First runner-up for Miss Iraq 2016
- Miss Asia Pacific International Iraq 2016
- The Ambassador of Social Affairs for Iraqi Refugees, awarded the title of Minister of Social Affairs Rashid Derbas
