= Saaed Khalifa =

Iraqi actor and comedian

Saaed Khalifa is an Iraqi actor and comedian. He stars in a television series called Hurry Up, He's Dead written by Baghdadi poet and writer, Talib Al Sudani which is filmed in Dubai; as it would be too dangerous and impractical, with curfews and loud helicopters flying overhead, to film in Baghdad.
