= 2025 in Iraq =

- Decades: 2000s; 2010s; 2020s
- See also: Other events of 2025; List of years in Iraq

Events of the year 2025 in Iraq.

== Incumbents ==
- President: Abdul Latif Rashid
- Prime Minister: Mohammed Shia' Al Sudani

== Events ==
=== January ===
- 2 January –
  - Opposition figure and activist Salman Al Khalidi is extradited to Kuwait to begin a prison sentence after fleeing on being convicted on 11 charges.
  - Abdullah Warte, official spokesperson of the Iraqi Kurdistan-based Islamic Movement of Kurdistan (IMK) political party, announces a proposal to establish an office in Damascus, becoming the first Kurdish and Iraqi political party to establish a presence in post-Assad Syria.
  - A $4.56 billion oil pipeline project connecting Basrah and Haditha to be developed by state-backed Basra Oil Company and Iraqi Oil Projects Company and funded under an Iraq-China agreement is approved.
- 21 January – The Iraqi parliament passes three controversial laws: the personal affairs law which allows Sharia courts increased authority over family affairs, a general amnesty law, and a law allowing for the return of Kurdish lands.
- 31 January – A bus carrying Shia Muslim pilgrims crashes into a car near Al Diwaniyah while driving to Najaf, killing seven people and injuring 42 others.

=== February ===
- 4 February – The Federal Supreme Court blocks the three controversial laws passed in January, sparking calls for protests in several cities.
- 11 February – The Federal Supreme Court upholds the three laws passed in January and overthrows the challenge issued earlier in the month.

=== March ===
- 13 March – Abdallah Maki Mosleh al-Rifai alias “Abu Khadija”, the deputy head of Islamic State, is reported to have been killed in an airstrike in Anbar Governorate.

=== April ===
- 1 April – Three people are injured in an axe attack on a procession of Assyrian Christians celebrating Akitu in Dohuk. The attacker, a suspected Islamic State supporter, is arrested.
- 6 April – The Iraqi Teachers Union declares a strike, demanding the government improve teachers' salaries and living standards.
- 8 April – Engineer Bashir Khalid dies in a hospital in Baghdad after being beaten by other inmates in detention, where he was placed with no charge after an argument with a police official. Video of the incident prompts widespread criticism.
- 14 April –
  - A massive sandstorm hits central and southern Iraq, resulting in more than 3,700 hospitalizations.
  - Prime Minister Al-Sudani, and President Rashid file an appeal to the Iraqi Federal Supreme court to reinstate the Khor Abdullah agreement which the court had overturned in September 2023.
- 26 April – Protesters gather in Tahrir square in Baghdad urging the Federal Supreme court to not reinstate the Khor Abdullah agreement describing it as "Humiliating" and " violating of Iraqi sovereignty".

=== May ===
- 10 May – The Iraqi government bans protests and demonstrations between 11 and 20 May in preparation for the Arab League summit.
- 12 May – The BBC Panorama program airs confessions of 30 British veterans accusing some of their colleagues of committing war crimes during their deployment in Iraq.
- 13 May – Syrian president Ahmed al-Sharaa withdraws from attending the Arab League summit after the invitation extended to him triggers tensions in Iraq over his former ties to Al-Qaeda. The Syrian foreign minister is tasked with leading the country's delegation.
- 16 May – Hasan Hadi becomes the first Iraqi filmmaker to have a film premiered at the Cannes Film Festival in France with the entry The President's Cake.
- 17 May – Iraq hosts the 34th Ordinary Arab League summit in Baghdad, attended by delegations of 20 Arab countries and several guests, including Spanish prime minister Pedro Sánchez and the Secretary-General of the United Nations, António Guterres.

=== June ===
- 1 June – Lebanese president Joseph Aoun heads an official delegation to Baghdad to discuss several issues regarding the relationship between the two countries.
- 8 June – Health authorities in Al Anbar Governorate announce that several hospitals received 214 cases of poisoning, mostly in Fallujah, traced back to a fast food restaurant in the city. All cases recover within 48 hours with no reported fatalities.
- 10 June –
  - The Iraqi national football team wins a match against Jordan during the world cup qualifiers, allowing Iraq another chance at qualifying for the world cup by competing in the Asian playoff round.
  - The United States orders a partial evacuation of its embassy staff and dependents in Iraq for security reasons.
- 13–24 June – Iraqi airspace and airports are closed to all flights due to the Israeli airstrikes on Iran. On 14 June, the Iraqi authorities extend the closure to most airports except for Basra International Airport which is allowed to operate international flights during daytime only. The closure of the airspace is fully lifted on 24 June after a ceasefire agreement is reached between Iran and Israel.
- 23 June – Iran launches missiles towards US army bases in the region.
- 24 June – The Taji military base north of Baghdad and Imam Ali Base in Dhi Qar Governorate are targeted by unidentified drones, damaging radar systems with no casualties reported. Iraqi defense authorities report that drones were shot down in other locations around the country.
- 29 June – Jassim Mohammed Abboud Al-Amiri resigns as head of the Federal Supreme Court of Iraq amid a political dispute that saw nine of its justices resign in the preceding weeks.

=== July ===
- 6 July – Twelve Turkish soldiers are killed by methane gas poisoning in a cave in northern Iraq while searching for the remains of a fellow soldier who was killed by the Kurdistan Workers' Party during Operation Claw-Lock in 2022.
- 8 July – Clashes break out in Erbil between members of the Harky tribe and the Peshmerga, the Kurdish security forces, following a dispute over water rights, leaving several dead and injured.
- 15 July – The Sarang oil field in Duhok Governorate is set on fire by a drone strike.
- 16 July –
  - Mosul International Airport reopens following an 11-year closure caused by the war with Islamic State.
  - 2025 Kut shopping mall fire: At least 61 people are killed in a fire at a shopping mall in Kut, Wasit Governorate.
- 19 July – A PKK member is killed in a drone attack of unknown origin in Penjwen District, Sulaymaniyah Governorate.
- 23 July – Muhammad Jamil Al-Mayahi resigns as governor of Wasit Governorate following criticism over the response to the 2025 Kut shopping mall fire.
- 27 July – A police officer is killed after the Popular Mobilization Forces storm the Ministry of Agriculture building in Karkh, Baghdad in protest over the removal of a director, triggering clashes.

=== August ===
- 6 August, 2025 Erbil shooting: Three people killed in a shooting at a petrol station in Erbil, Kurdistan Region, following a dispute between the employees and two Arab customers, who were reportedly tourists.
- 10 August – Around 621 Shiite pilgrims commemorating Arbaeen are hospitalized after inhaling chlorine following a leak at a water treatment station in Karbala.
- 11 August – A nationwide blackout occurs after two transmission lines are shut down due to high temperatures and increased demand in Babylon and Karbala Governorates during Arbaeen.
- 13 August – A bus carrying Arbaeen pilgrims collides with a minibus on the Najaf–Basra road, killing five people and injuring 57 others.
- 22 August – Politician Lahur Talabani is arrested at a hotel in Sulaymaniyah on charges of "conspiracy aimed at destabilizing security and stability" following a standoff with police that leave three people dead.

=== September ===
- 1 September – The Great Mosque of al-Nuri in Mosul officially reopens following reconstruction works to undo its demolition by Islamic State militants in 2017.
- 9 September – Authorities announce the release of Israeli-Russian academic Elizabeth Tsurkov, who was abducted in Baghdad in March 2023 while doing her doctoral studies.
- 27 September – Iraq resumes exports of oil to Turkey through the Kirkuk–Ceyhan Oil Pipeline following a 2023 dispute over unauthorized exports by authorities in the Kurdistan Region that led to its closure.
- 29 September – A court in Najaf sentences a man to life imprisonment for recruiting fighters to fight for Russia in Russo-Ukrainian war.

=== October ===
- 13 October – Prime Minister Al-Sudani attends the 2025 Gaza peace summit in Sharm El Sheikh, Egypt.
- 14 October – As part of the 2026 FIFA World Cup qualification, Iraq ends its game with Saudi Arabia in a 0-0 draw, missing the chance to directly qualify for the 2026 FIFA World Cup but advancing for the next round of global playoffs.

=== November ===
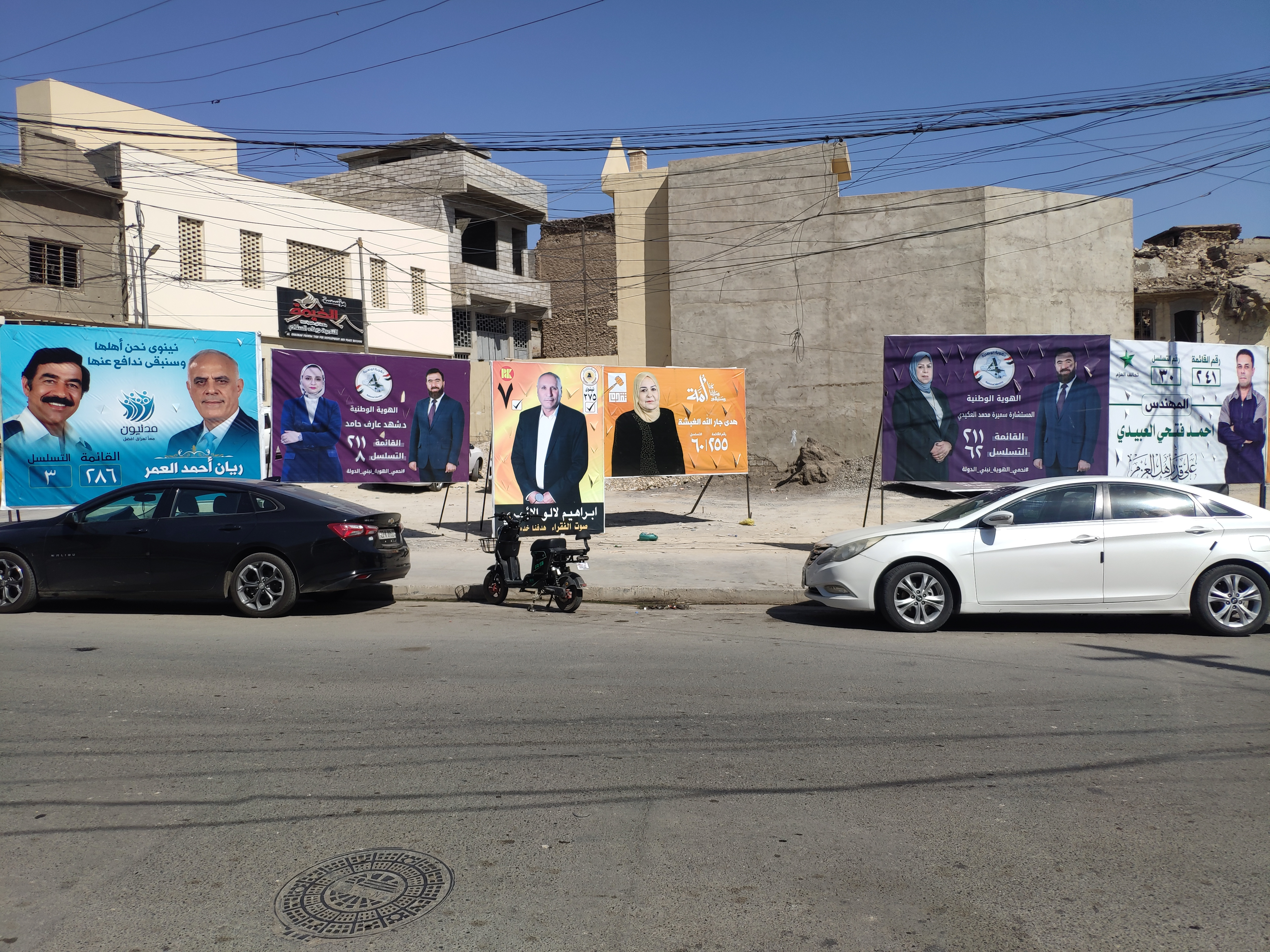
- Parliamentary Elections Posters in Mosul
  11 November – 2025 Iraqi parliamentary election: The Reconstruction and Development Coalition of prime ministers Sudani wins a plurality of seats in the Council of Representatives of Iraq.
- 16 November – The PKK announces its withdrawal from the Zap region bordering Turkey.
- 17 November – The government designates Hezbollah and the Houthi movement as terrorist organizations, but retracts the decision on 4 December citing an "error".
- 26 November – A drone attack is carried out on the Khor Mor gasfield, causing power outages in the Kurdistan Region.
- 29 November – One person is killed in an attack by suspected rioters on several fuel trucks in Erbil Governorate.

=== December ===
- 13 December – The United Nations Assistance Mission for Iraq is formally closed after 22 years in operation.
- 18 December – Former president Barham Salih is elected as United Nations High Commissioner for Refugees by the United Nations General Assembly.
- 28 December – The Supreme Criminal Tribunal sentences a former Ba'athist lieutenant to death for the massacre of Barzanis during the Anfal campaign.
- 29 December – The Council of Representatives elects Haibat al-Halbousi from the Progress Party as speaker by a vote of 208–66–9.

== Holidays ==
- 1 January – New Year's Day
- 5 January – Iraqi Army Day
- 21 March – Nowruz
- 30–31 March – Eid al-Fitr
- 9 April – Liberation Day
- 1 May – Labour Day
- 6–9 June – Eid al-Adha
- 26 June – Islamic New Year
- 6 July – Ashura
- 14 July – Republic Day
- 16 August – Arba'in
- 4 September – Mawlid
- 3 October – National day
- 10 December – Victory Day
- 25 December – Christmas Day

== Art and entertainment ==
- List of Iraqi submissions for the Academy Award for Best International Feature Film

== Deaths ==
- 2 January – Qusay Albasri, actor and director.(b.1942)
- 6 January – Aḥmad Khalaf, novelist.(b.1943)
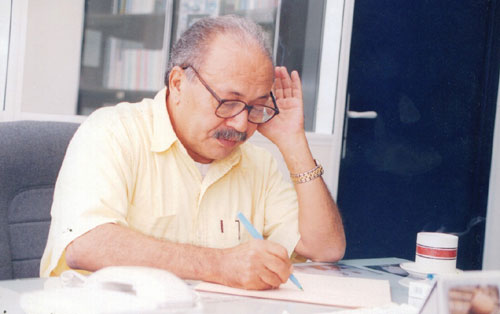
- Jumʻah al-Lami
  24 January – Mukarram Talabani, politician.(b.1923)
- 25 January – Rīkān Ibrāhīm, poet and psychologist.(b.1952)
- 27 January – Mohamed Shukri Jameel, director.(b.1937)
- 29 January – Salwan Momika, anti-Islam activist.(b.1986)
- 2 February – Sadiq Faraj, journalist and writer. (b.1957)
- 8 February – Issam Al-Chalabi, politician.(b.1942)
- 15 February – Arshad Tawfiq, poet and diplomat.(b.1944).
- 6 April – Hameed Sabir, actor and academic.
- 9 April – Jawad Mohsen, singer.
- 17 April – Jumʻah al-Lami, writer.(b.1947)
- 23 April – Faraj Yāsīn, writer.(1945)
- 13 May –Luay Zahra, writer and theatre actor.
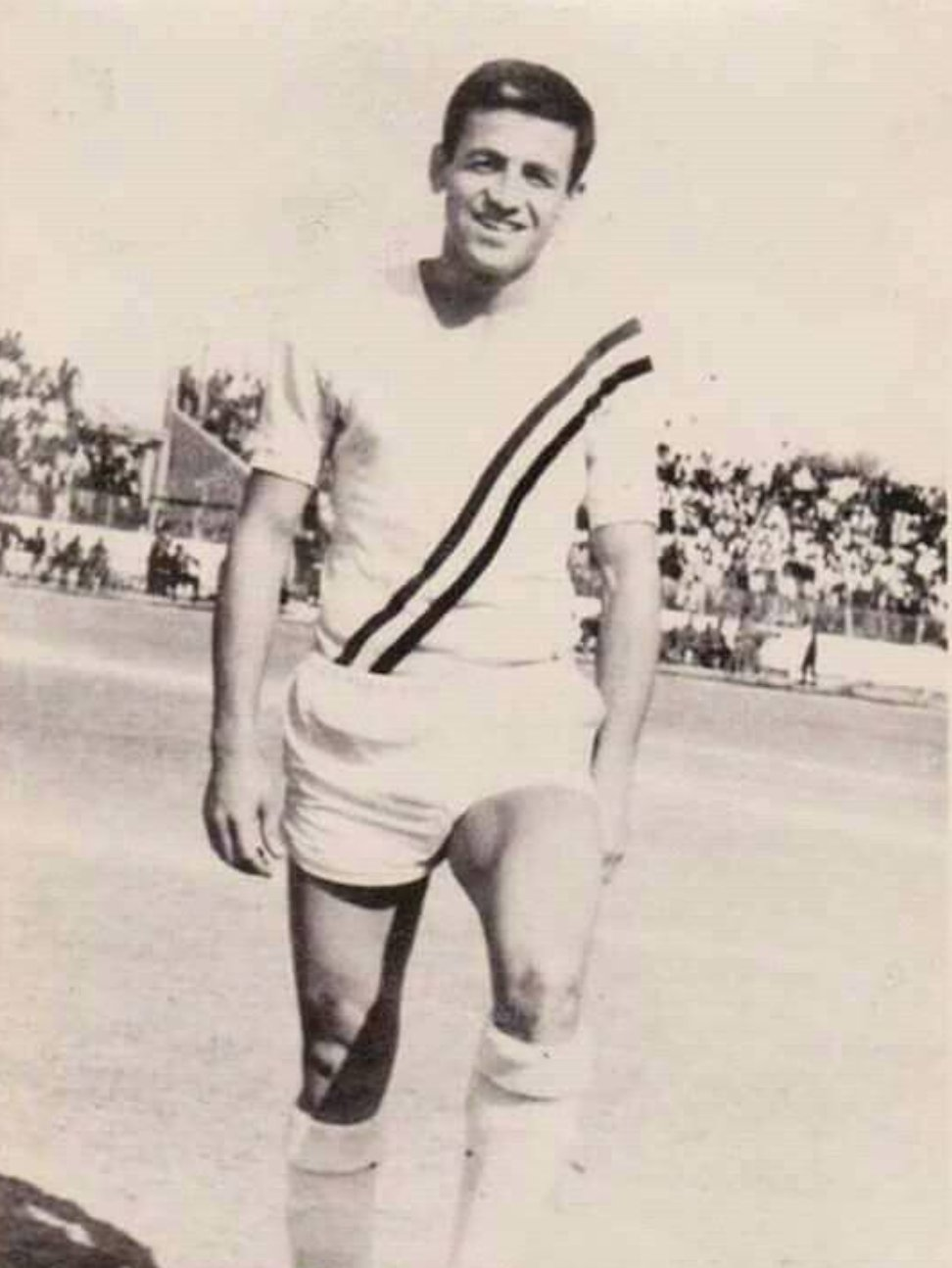
  Shidrak Yousif
- 15 May – Muafaq Mohammed, poet.(b.1948)
- 6 June – Ghazwa Al-Khalidi, actress.(1943)
- 3 July – Taleb Al-Rubaie, actor.(b.1951)
- 9 July – Iqbal Naeem, actress.(1958)
- 23 July – Sabah ِAl-Rubaie, journalist.(b.1954)
- 4 August – Ban Ziad Tariq, 34, psychiatrist and TikToker.
- 5 ِAugust – Shidrak Yousif, footballer and sports commentator.
- 26 August – Salima Khudair, 78, actress.
- 12 September – Abas Al-Harbi, 75, actor.
- 14 September – Hamoudi Izaab, cartoonist.
- 20 September – Dawoud Al-Farhan, writer and journalist.
- 20 September – Jamal Al-Samawi, 75, musician.
- 27 September – Muhsin Hussein, journalist and news editor.
- 2 October – Sami Kamal,75, singer.
- 3 October – Iyad Al-Taie, actor.(b.1965)
- 9 November – Muhammad Jamil Shalash, poet and writer.(b.1930)
- 24 December – Najih al-Mamouri, 81, writer.

=== Date Unknown ===
- Hashim Samarchi, artist.(b.1939)

== See also ==
- Timeline of Iraq history
- Years in Iraq
