= 2023 in Iraq =

- Decades: 2000s; 2010s; 2020s
- See also: Other events of 2023; List of years in Iraq

Events of the year 2023 in Iraq.

== Incumbents ==
- President: Abdul Latif Rashid
- Prime Minister: Mohammed Shia' Al Sudani

== Events ==
=== January ===
- 19 January –
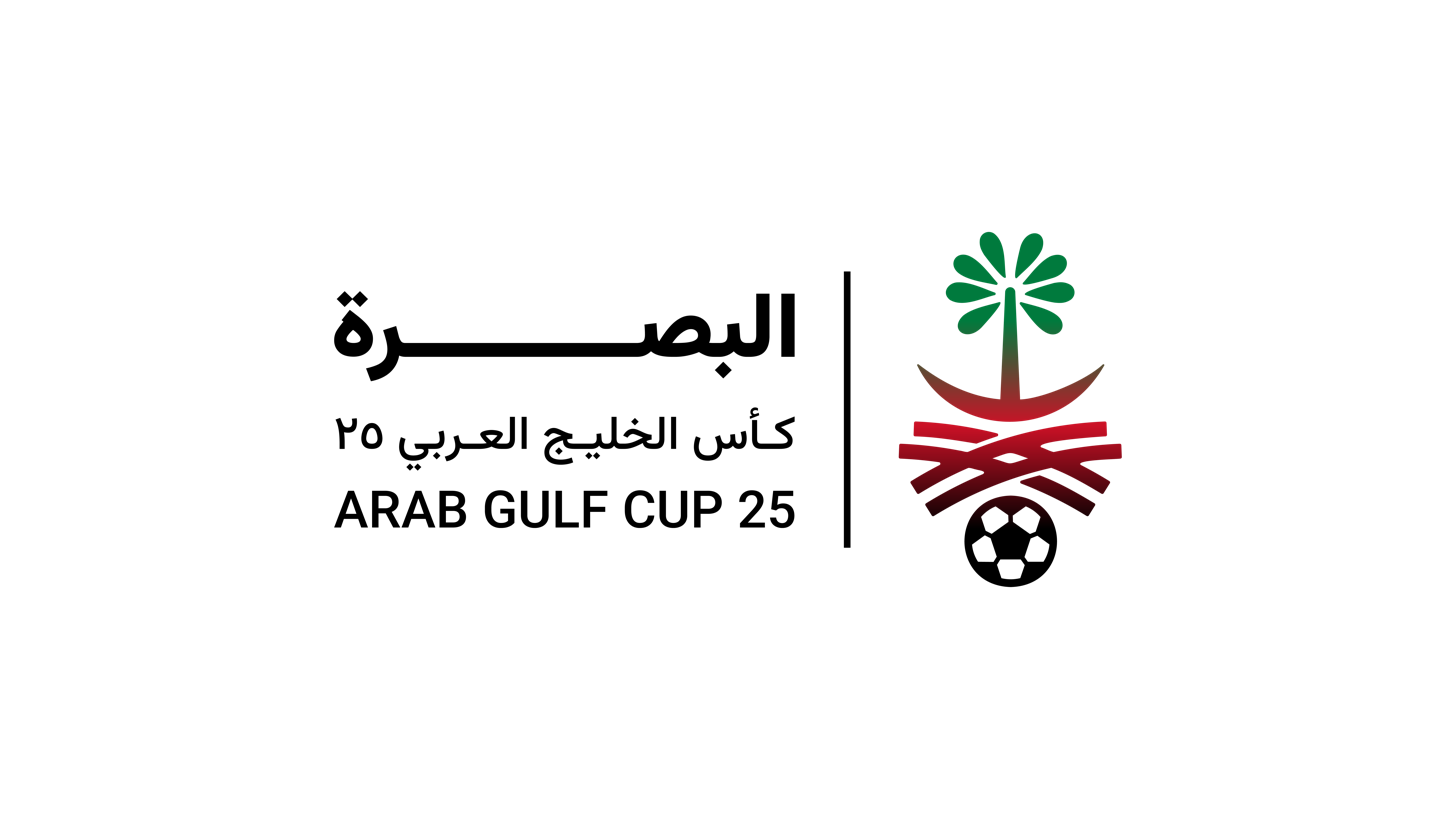
  - 25th Arabian Gulf Cup logo
    Arabian Gulf Cup stampede, kills four and injures up to 80+ after the 25th Arabian Gulf Cup in Basra.
  - Iraq wins the 25th Arabian Gulf Cup for the 4th time in history and the first time since 1988.
- 27 January – Iraq and France sign a bilateral cooperation agreement during a visit of Iraqi prime minister to Paris.
- 31 January – Killing of Tiba al-Ali, a 23-year-old woman strangled by her father in Al Diwaniyah while sleeping.

=== February ===
- 6 February – Russian foreign minister, Sergey Lavrov, visits Iraq to discuss economic and strategic relations between the two countries.
- February – During excavations in Lagash, archologists find an ancient tavern with food remains that is estimated to be over 5,000 years old, providing a unique look at the dietary habits of ancient people.

=== March ===
- 1 March – United Nations Secretary General Antonio Guterres visits Iraq for the first time in six years.
- 23 March – Iraq wins a landmark arbitration case against Turkey over the exportation of oil through the Kurdistan region.
- 27 March – The Iraqi Parliament passes 206–12 a series of amendments reducing the electoral districts in each governorate to one, ahead of local elections in November. Voting blocs and independent members who boycotted the vote claim the amendments make it more difficult for the opposition to get elected.

=== April ===
- 7 April – Turkish military targets Sulaimaniyah airport, drawing condemnations from the Iraqi government.
- 12 April – Iraq signs a Memorandum of Understanding with UNDP to combat corruption.

=== May ===
- 23-24 May – Duchess of Edinburgh, princess Sophie Rhys-Jones, visits Baghdad in support of victims of sexual violence, becoming the first royal to visit Iraq.
- 27 May – Iraq launches a $17 billion project that aims to connect the Grand Faw Port with Turkey by road and rail.

=== June ===
- 3 June – Syria repatriates 50 Islamic State fighters and 168 relatives of fighters to Iraq.
- 15 June – The emir of Qatar, Tamim bin Hamad Al-Thani, visits Baghdad and meets officials in both Baghdad and Kurdistan.
- 26 June – During clashes near Kirkuk, 3 Islamic State militants and one Iraqi soldier are killed.
- 29 June – Iraqi protesters storm the Swedish embassy in Baghdad after videos of Quran burning in Sweden spread on social media.

=== July ===
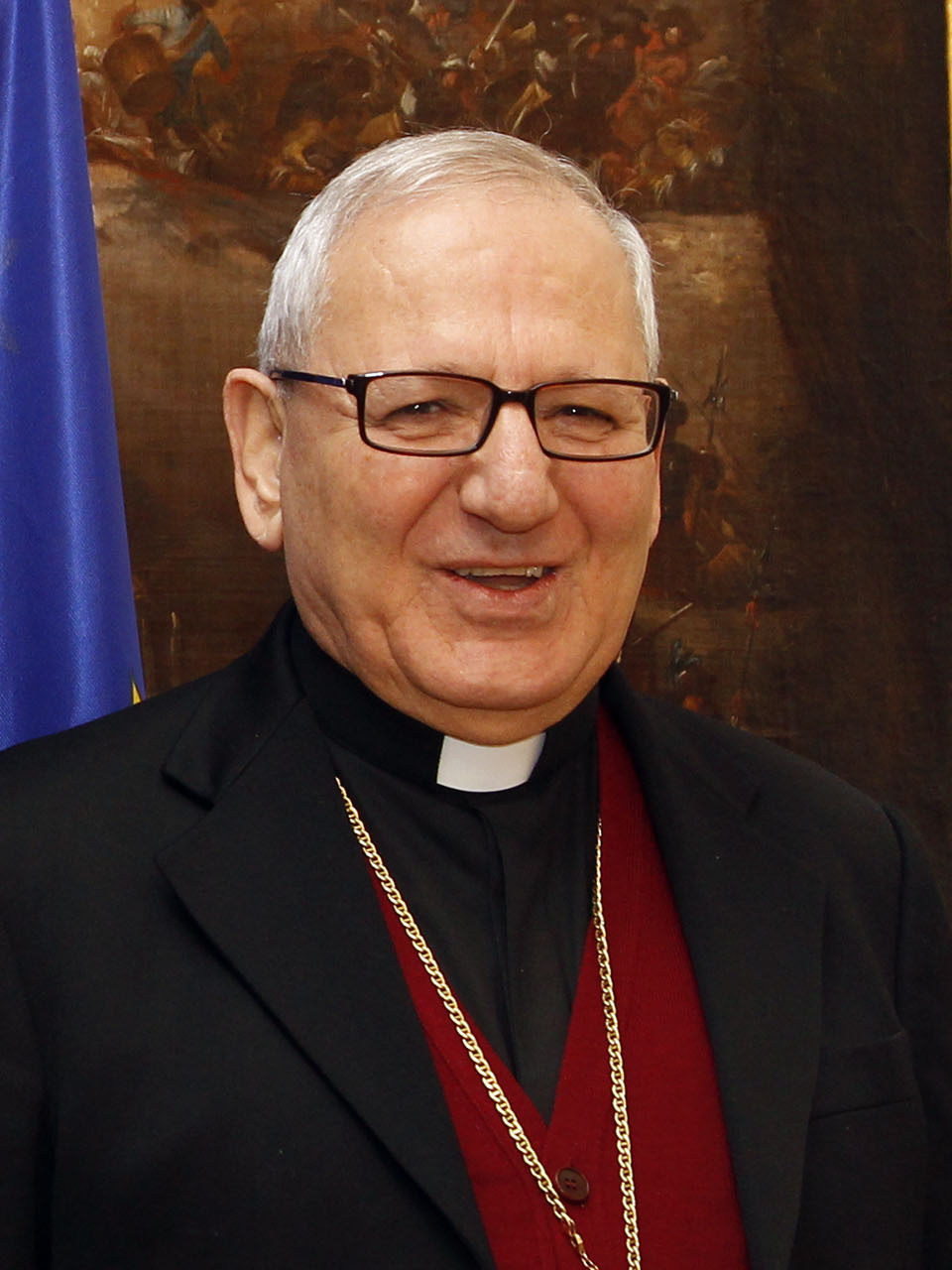
- Cardinal Louis Sako
  3 July – Iraqi president issues a decree revoking a 2013 decree that recognized Louis Raphaël I Sako as Chaldean Catholic Patriarch of Baghdad.
- 13 July – Hundreds of Christian Iraqis protest in Ankawa demanding the Iraqi government reinstate cardinal Sako as patriarch.
- 15 July – Amid rising tension between cardinal Sako and the government, the cardinal left Baghdad and headed to Kurdistan.
- 20 July – Followers of Shiite cleric Muqtada al-Sadr set fire to the Swedish embassy in Baghdad in reaction to a planned Quran desecration demonstration in Stockholm. The Swedish foreign ministry confirms the safety of its embassy staff and the Iraqi foreign ministry condemns the incident, initiating an investigation to identify those responsible.
- 21 July – Swedish embassy in Baghdad temporarily suspends operations.
- 22 July – The murder and torture of a 7 year old child, Mousa Walaa, at the hand of his stepmother sparks anger in Iraq and demands of justice.
- 31 July – World Health Organization recognizes Iraq as the 50th country to eliminate Trachoma as a public health threat.

=== August ===
- 10 August – Five Turkish soldiers are killed during clashes with PKK militants.
- 27 August – The stepmother of murder victim Mousa Walaa is convicted of his killing and sentenced to 15 years in prison.
- 28 August – A French soldier is killed during a joint anti-terrorism operation with Iraqi forces in Kirkuk.

=== September ===
- 2 September – Rival protests in Kirkuk, between Kurdish, Turkmen and Arab residents of the city devolved into violent clashes resulting in 4 dead and 15 injured.
- 13 September – Germany extends the mandate for German army operations in Iraq, up to 500 soldiers set to be deployed up to October, 2024.
- 21 September – The Iraqi Federal Supreme Court overturns the Khor Abdullah agreement with Kuwait which had been voted on by Parliament in 2013. The court declared the agreement unconstitutional for not passing the 2 thirds majority required.
- 26 September – Qaraqosh wedding fire: More than 100 people are killed and more than 150 others are injured in a fire at a wedding in Qaraqosh, Nineveh Governorate

=== October ===
- 13 October – Thousands of protesters march in Baghdad in solidarity with Palestinians after the beginning of Israeli airstrikes on Gaza.
- 17 October – Iraqi government declares state of mourning for three days for victims of al-Ahli al-Arabi Baptist Hospital massacre in Gaza.
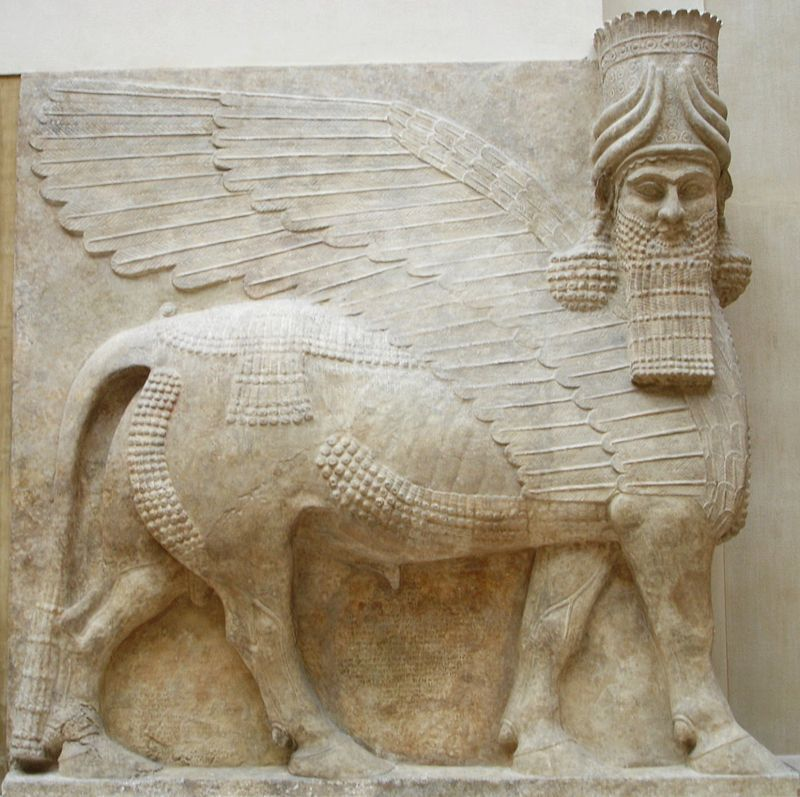
- Lamassu sculpture
  19 October – Drones and rockets strike the Al-Asad Airbase in Al Anbar Governorate, Iraq, which houses U.S. troops.
- 24 October – 2,700 year old, mostly intact, winged Lamassu sculpture is unearthed near Mosul.
- 31 October – Ain al-Asad airbase that hosts U.S and coalition forces is targeted by 2 armed drones, with no reported casualties.

=== November ===
- 10 November – U.S. forces are attacked three times in the past 24 hours in Iraq, including drone strikes on Al-Asad Airbase and Al-Harir Air Base, and an IED attack on a U.S. patrol near the Mosul Dam. No casualties are reported.
- 14 November – The Federal Supreme Court of Iraq dismisses Parliament Speaker Mohamed Al-Halbousi and Representative Laith al-Duleimi, following a complaint alleging that Halbousi falsified a resignation letter that would have removed Duleimi from parliament.
- 30 November – A gun attack by the Islamic State in Diyala results in 11 civilians dead and several wounded.

=== December ===
- 8 December – The US embassy got attacked, again. And there were dozens of attacks on U.S. military bases by Iran-backed factions in Iraq in the preceding months, raising fears of repeated traumatic brain injuries to Americans & renewing the state of undeclared de facto war.
- 18 December – Provincial council elections take place for the first time since 2013.
- 23 December – Seventeen PKK militants and 12 Turkish soldiers are killed during two days of shootouts in northern Iraq.
- 26 December – Two men from Kuwait and Saudi Arabia on an hunting trip in Iraq are killed when their vehicle hits a roadside bomb planted by Islamic State insurgents in Al Anbar Governorate.

== Deaths ==
- 31 January: Tiba al-Ali, 22, Iraqi-born Turkish social media personality.
- 5 February: Mordechai Bibi, 100, Iraqi-born Israeli politician, MK (1959–1974).
- 9 February: Ali al-Bahadili, 80, politician, minister of agriculture (2005–2010).
- 12 February: Behnam Afas,91, author and researchers.
- 7 March: Ibtisam Abdallah, 80, writer and translator.
- 20 March: Abdul Rahman Majeed al-Rubaie, 83, novelist (The Tattoo Mark).
- 2 April: Aram Karam, 93, footballer (national team).
- 3 June: Khalid Kishtainy, 93, writer and satirist.
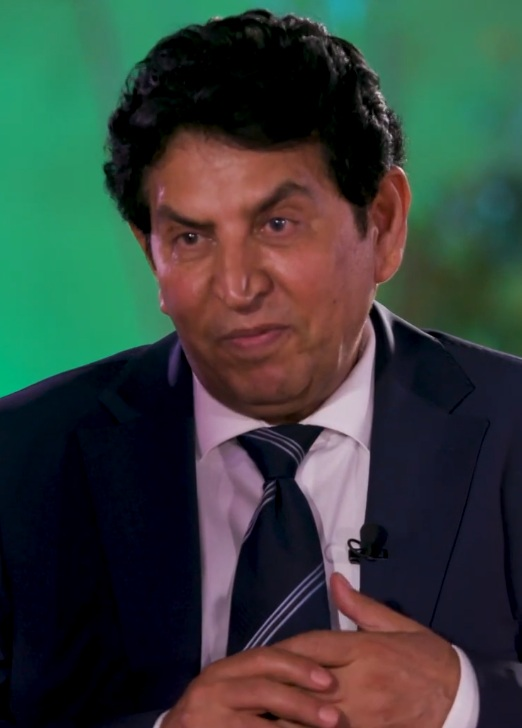
- Karim Al Iraqi
  22 June: Jacques Ishaq, 85, Chaldean Catholic hierarch, archbishop of Arbil (1997–1999) and curial bishop of the Chaldean Patriarchate (2005–2014).
- 4 July: Amer Alwan, 66, Iraqi-French film director and actor (The Girl on the Train).
- 22 July: Karim Allawi Homaidi, 95, football player (Al-Minaa, national team) and manager (Al-Minaa).
- 28 August: Rabban al-Qas, 74, Chaldean Catholic prelate, bishop of Amadiya (2001–2021).
- 1 September: Karim Al Iraqi, 68, poet.
- 6 September: Adnan Al-Kaissie, 84, professional wrestler (AWA, WWWF, WWF).
- 16 September: Qasem Taei, 63, grand ayatollah.
- 17 September:
  - Muhammad Mahdi al-Khorasani, 94, grand ayatollah.
  - Sami Azara al-Majun, 91, politician.
- 22 September: Sharar Haidar, 52, football player (national team) and executive, chairman of Al-Karkh (since 2003), heart attack.
- 5 December: Aatqall Taúaa, 74, sculptor, film critic and novelist.

== See also ==
=== Country overviews ===
- History of Iraq
- History of modern Iraq
- Outline of Iraq
- Government of Iraq
- Politics of Iraq
- Timeline of Iraq history
- Years in Iraq
