= 2024 in Iraq =

- Decades: 2000s; 2010s; 2020s
- See also: Other events of 2024; List of years in Iraq

Events of the year 2024 in Iraq.

== Incumbents ==
- President: Abdul Latif Rashid
- Prime Minister: Mohammed Shia' Al Sudani

== Events ==
=== January ===
- 4 January – A US drone strike in Baghdad kills four Harakat Hezbollah al-Nujaba militants, including senior leader Mushtaq Talib al-Saidi.
- 5 January – Prime Minister Mohammed Shia' Al Sudani announces that the Iraqi government is beginning the process to remove the U.S.-led international military coalition from the country following U.S. drone strike on 4 January.
- 20 January – The United States Central Command says that a ballistic missile attack by Iranian-backed militias on Al-Asad Airbase in Al Anbar Governorate injured several U.S. troops and at least one Iraqi soldier.
- 24 January – The US military launches airstrikes on facilities in Iraq used by Kata'ib Hezbollah and other Iranian-backed militias, in retaliation for the 20 January attack on Al-Asad Airbase.
- 31 January – Kata'ib Hezbollah suspends operations against the U.S. military in Iraq, to "prevent embarrassment of the Iraqi government".

=== February ===
- 2 February – February 2024 American strikes in Iraq and Syria: The US launches retaliatory airstrikes targeting Iran-backed militias in Iraq and Syria, in response to an attack that killed three US troops in Jordan.
- 7 February – Two Kata'ib Hezbollah commanders are assassinated in Baghdad by an American drone strike on their car.
- 21 February – Clashes between rival Shia militias in Baghdad, Basra, and other provinces allegedly kill 200 fighters.
- 25 February – Turkey launches an airstrike in northern Iraq, killing 4 alleged PKK members.

=== March ===
- 10 March – The Iraqi Army says it killed 10 jihadists in an "Anti-IS Operation" northwest of Baghdad.
- 14 March – The National Security Council formally bans the Kurdistan Workers' Party following a high-level meeting between Iraqi and Turkish officials in Baghdad.
- 21 March – The Islamic Resistance in Iraq launches drone attacks on Kiryat Shmona Airport and Ben Gurion Airport in Israel.

=== April ===
- 1 April – The Islamic Resistance in Iraq launches three drones at Eilat, Israel, damaging a building, but not causing injuries.
- 2 April – A refrigerator truck crashes into a group of children in Basra, killing six and injuring 14.
- 19 April –
  - Missiles believed to be fired by the Israel Defense Forces allegedly hit sites near the Iranian city of Isfahan, sites in Iraq and radar sites in Syria.
  - An Iraqi Popular Mobilization Forces command post at the Kalsu military base is hit by an explosion resulting from an air strike, killing one fighter and wounding six others. Security sources say it is not known who was responsible, and Israel and the United States both deny involvement.
- 27 April – The Council of Representatives of Iraq votes to criminalize same-sex relationships, to be punishable by a maximum of 15 years in prison.

=== May ===
- 3 May – Four hikers are killed after being caught in a flood in Qaradagh District, Sulaymaniyah Governorate in Iraqi Kurdistan.
- 6 May – The Turkish Air Force carries out airstrikes on Iraqi Kurdistan, reportedly killing 16 PKK insurgents.

=== June ===
- 23 June – The Houthis claim to have carried out a joint military operation with the Islamic Resistance in Iraq to target four vessels in the Port of Haifa, Israel.
- 29 June – Five large bombs planted by ISIL are discovered in the walls of the Great al-Nuri Mosque in Mosul.

=== July ===
- 9 July – A court in Baghdad sentences Asma Mohamed, a widow of Islamic State founder Abu Bakr al-Baghdadi to death over her involvement in the group and in the kidnapping of Yazidi women in Sinjar.
- 30 July –
  - Four members of Kata'ib Hezbollah are killed in a suspected US strike on a Popular Mobilization Forces base south of Baghdad.
  - The Turkish defense ministry says that it targeted Kurdish militants in northern Iraq with air strikes, killing 13 people.

=== August ===
- 5 August – At least five US military personnel are injured in a rocket attack on the Al-Asad Airbase in Anbar Governorate.
- 22 August – Clashes break out between units of the Iraqi Army and the Popular Mobilization Forces in Karbala, leading to the arrest of six militiamen.
- 23 August – Two journalists are killed in an airstrike on their car by the Turkish military in Iraqi Kurdistan.
- 29 August –
  - Iraq shoots down a Turkish TAI Aksungur drone over Kirkuk Governorate.
  - 2024 Anbar raid. The US says it had killed 15 operatives of Islamic State in a joint operation with Iraqi security forces in western Iraq that also injured seven American soldiers.

=== September ===
- 5 September – A Turkish drone strike kills three people, including a child, in Iraqi Kurdistan one day after a similar attack on a car in the region killed three people from the same family.
- 11–13 September –
  - Iranian president Masoud Pezeshkian visits Iraq, meeting with federal authorities in Baghdad as well as leaders of Iraqi Kurdistan in Erbil.
  - Abu Ali Al-Tunisi, an Islamic State commander for whom the US Treasury Department had offered $5 million for information, is killed during a joint United States–Iraq operation in Al Anbar Governorate. Ahmad Hamed Zwein, an Islamic State deputy commander in Iraq, is also killed in the operation.
- 25 September – Twenty-one people are executed in Nasiriyah Central Prison after being convicted of terrorism offences.
- 27 September – Iraq and the United States agree to end the US–led coalition mission in Iraq by September 2025 with all remaining American troops withdrawing by the end of 2026.

=== October ===
- 2 October – Four Iraqi soldiers are killed and three injured in an ambush by Islamic State militants near Kirkuk.
- 3 October – The Iraqi government announces the rescue and repatriation of a 21-year old Yazidi woman who was abducted by Islamic State from Sinjar in 2014 and subsequently taken to the Gaza Strip, where she was trapped during the Gaza war following the killing of her captor in an Israeli airstrike.
- 18 October - Four Kentucky men of Iraqi-descent are charged in a conspiracy to smuggle in 38 handguns into Iraq.
- 19 October -
  - The headquarters of the Saudi-based news channel MBC in Baghdad is stormed and looted after a report aired on the channel describes several militant groups as "terrorists", including Hamas, Hezbollah, and the Popular Mobilization Forces. The Iraqi government subsequently announces that it would revoke the outlet's operating licence.
  - Clashes between protestors and police break out over demonstrations of arrested activists at Al-Habboubi Square in Nasiriyah.
- 20 October – 2024 Kurdistan Region parliamentary election: The ruling Kurdistan Democratic Party wins a plurality of 39 seats in the 100-seat Kurdistan Region Parliament, while its coalition partner, the Patriotic Union of Kurdistan, wins 23 seats.
- 22 October – Jassim al-Mazroui Abu Abdul Qader, the leader of the Islamic State in Iraq, is reported killed along with eight other senior IS officials in an operation by security forces in the Hamrin Mountains in Saladin Governorate.
- 31 October – Mahmoud al-Mashhadani is elected for a second non-consecutive period as speaker of the Speaker of the Council of Representatives of Iraq.

=== November ===
- 20 November – Iraq holds its first national census since 1997.

=== December ===
- 18 December – The Karkh Court of Appeals in Baghdad reverses a ruling imposed in February 2022 by the Federal Supreme Court of Iraq that halted the export of oil from Kurdistan through the Iraq-Turkey Pipeline filed by the Iraq Oil Ministry due to disputes with the Kurdish Peshmerga militia.
- 31 December – 8 people, including five children, are brutally murdered in Al-Sadr district in Baghdad. Two suspects, a man and his wife, are arrested for the crime.

== Holidays ==
- 1 January - New Year's Day
- 5 January - Iraqi Army Day
- 21 March - Nowruz
- 9 April - Liberation Day
- 10–12 April – Eid al-Fitr
- 1 May – Labour Day
- 16–19 June – Eid al-Adha
- 7 July – Islamic New Year
- 14 July – Republic Day
- 16 July – Ashura
- 24 August - Arba'in
- 15 September – The Prophet's day of birth
- 3 October – National day
- 8 December – Victory Day
- 25 December - Christmas Day

== Art and entertainment ==
- List of Iraqi submissions for the Academy Award for Best International Feature Film

== Deaths ==
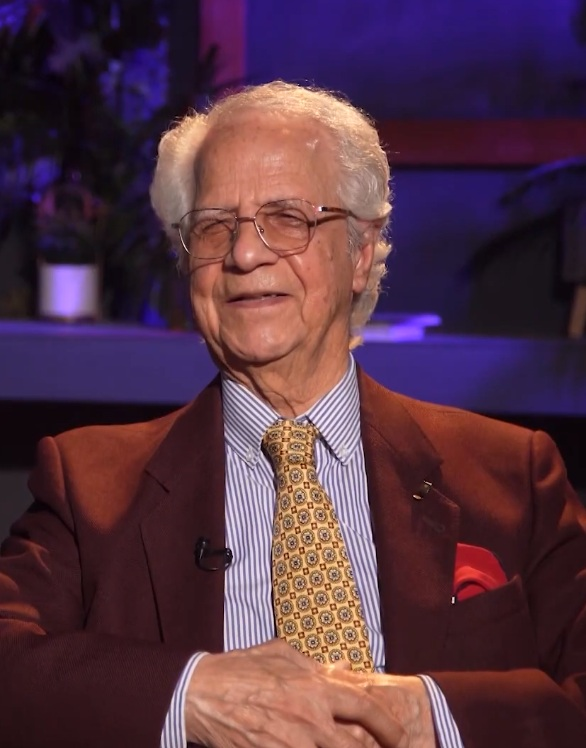
Hammoudi Al-Harithi

- 4 January – Mushtaq Talib Al-Saeedi, militant. (b.1980)
- 30 January – Aziz Saleh Al-Numan, politician.(b.1941)
- 24 February – Ahmed Abdul-Ghafur, politician and scholar. (b.1955)
- 26 April – Umm Fahad, influencer and blogger.(b.1996)
- 22 May – Ibrahim Haydari, sociologist. (b.1936)
- 27 May – Salah Omar al-Ali, politician and diplomat. (b.1938)
- 19 July – Duraid Kashmoula, politician. (b.1943)
- 17 August – Hammoudi Al-Harithi, actor and comedian.(b.1936)
- 27 August –Mohamed Ahmed Al-Rashid, Islamic scholar.(b.1938)
- 2 September – Fadhil al-Milani, Iraqi-Iranian religious scholar. (1944)
- 16 September – Anwar Jassam, football coach. (b.1947)
- 20 October – Ashti Hawrami, politician.(b.1948)

== See also ==
- Timeline of Iraq history
- Years in Iraq
