= 2026 in Iraq =

- Decades: 2000s; 2010s; 2020s
- See also: Other events of 2026; List of years in Iraq

Events of the year 2026 in Iraq.

== Incumbents ==
- President:
  - Abdul Latif Rashid (Until 11 April)
  - Nizar Amidi (From 12 April)
- Prime Minister:
  - Mohammed Shia' Al Sudani (Until 14 May)
  - Ali al-Zaidi (From 14 May)

== Events ==
=== January ===
- 21 January – US Central Command launches an operation to transfer up to 7,000 IS detainees from Syria to Iraq.
- 24 January –
  - The Coordination Framework, which hold a majority in the Council of Representatives, nominates former prime minister Nouri al-Maliki to return to office, which he previously held between 2006 and 2014.
  - Academics and university staff begin an open ended strike after the Ministry of Finance announces cuts to their salaries.
- 27 January – 2026 Iraqi presidential election.

=== February ===
- 6 February – A man detonates an explosive belt while being arrested, killing himself and injuring two security forces members in al-Khaseem, Al-Qa'im District.
- 9 February – The National Security Service announces the execution of Saadoun Sabri al-Qaisi, a former major general during the Saddam Hussein regime who had been convicted of crimes against humanity including the assassinations of cleric Muhammad Baqir al-Sadr and his sister, Amina al-Sadr, in 1980.
- 22 February – Kuwait summons the Iraqi chargé d'affaires in protest over the submission by Iraq of revised maps and maritime boundaries to the United Nations.
- 25 February – A pile-up on Freeway 1 kills 13 people and injures five near Fallujah.
- 28 February –
  - Iraq closes its airspace after the U.S. and Israel launch an attack on Iran.
  - At least two airstrikes targeting Popular Mobilization Forces (PMF) headquarters in Jurf al-Nasr kills two and injures eight militia members.
  - Erbil International Airport is targeted twice with drone attacks, which were reportedly intercepted.

=== March ===
- 1 March –
  - Iraq announces three days of mourning after the killing of Iranian Supreme Leader Ayatollah Ali Khamenei. Iraqis also protest at the Green Zone which houses foreign embassies in Baghdad.
  - Four PMF members are killed in an unidentified airstrike targeting one of their headquarters in Diyala Governorate.
  - A US kamikaze drone falls without exploding on a farm in western Iraq.
- 2 March – The US orders all non-emergency personnel and ‌their families to evacuate Iraq alongside other countries in the region.
- 3 March –
  - Iraq shuts down production at the Rumaila oil field for lack of storage space as oil exports struggle to exit the Strait of Hormuz.
  - An unidentified force, suspected to be American or Israeli, is spotted flying helicopters from Syria and landing in the Najaf desert before being intercepted by Iraqi forces, resulting in a shootout that kills one and injures two Iraqi soldiers.
- 4 March – A nationwide blackout occurs with the Ministry of Electricity saying the power grid has gone down entirely, and that the cause is under investigation.
- 5 March – Iraqi forces shoot down a drone that attempted to attack the United States Victoria airbase near Baghdad.
- 6 March –
  - U.S. Air Force helicopters launch air-to-surface missiles at PMF positions near Mosul.
  - Drones hit a hotel in Erbil.
- 7 March – The US embassy in Baghdad is targeted by rockets.
- 9 March – A drone attack damages the UAE's consulate in Erbil.
- 10 March
  - Four members of the militant group Kata'ib al-Imam Ali are killed in a US airstrike in Dibis District, Kirkuk Governorate.
  - Cardinal Louis Raphaël I Sako, the head of the Chaldean Catholic Church and the Patriarch of Baghdad, retires at the age of 76.
- 11 March – Two oil tankers are attacked near Basra, resulting in authorities stopping all oil operations in the port.
- 12 March –
  - At least 20 people are killed in an airstrike targeting a building of the PMF in Akashat.
  - The Italian military base in Erbil is struck by a missile, with no casualties of injuries reported.
  - A French soldier is killed while six others are injured in a drone attack on their base in Mala Qara, Erbil Governorate.
  - A Boeing KC-135 Stratotanker of the US Air Force crashes in Iraq during refueling operations, killing all six crew members.
- 14 March –
  - The US embassy in Baghdad is hit by a missile strike.
  - The Hungarian Defence Forces announces its withdrawal from its garrison in Erbil airbase due to war.
- 15 March – Iraqi militia groups use FPV drones to attack a US military base near Baghdad International Airport.
- 16 March –
  - Three PMF members are injured in an airstrike near the Badush Dam in Mosul.
  - At least eight Iraqi soldiers and PMF member are killed in a suspected US attack on a checkpoint in Al-Qaim near the Iraq–Syria border.
- 17 March –
  - The US embassy in Baghdad is targeted with drone attacks, causing a small fire inside the compound.
  - At least four people are killed in an airstrike on a house in the Al-Jadriya district of Baghdad, reportedly used as a headquarters by the PMF.
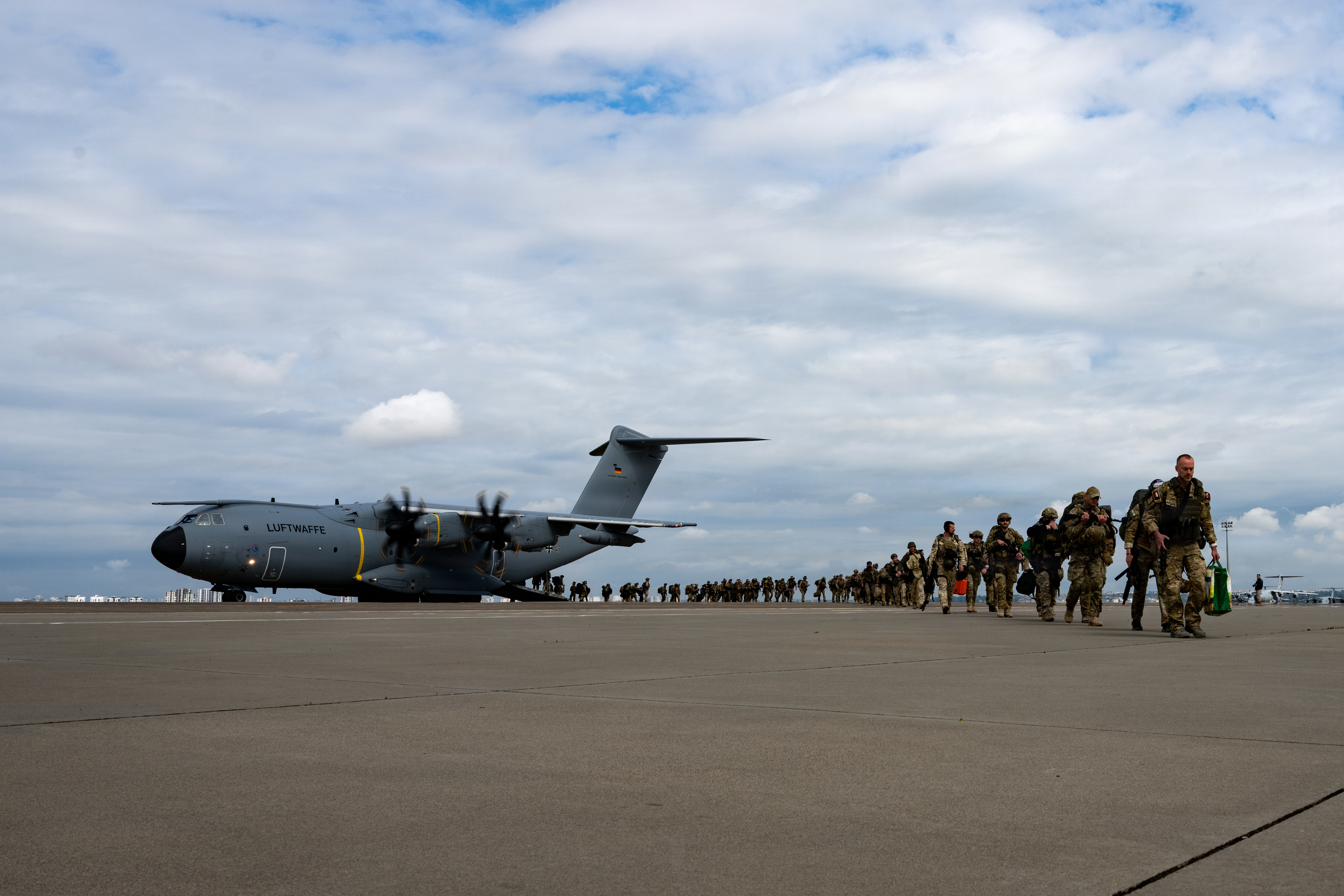
- NATO personnel redeployed from Bagdad, 19-20 March
  18 March – Iraq reaches a deal with Turkey and the Kurdistan Region to resume oil exports through the Kirkuk–Ceyhan Oil Pipeline.
- 19 March – Two PMF fighters are killed in airstrikes in Nineveh and Saladin Governorates.
- 20 March –
  - Polish defence minister Władysław Kosiniak-Kamysz announces the withdrawal of Polish forces from Iraq, stationed there as part of the CJTF–OIR joint task force against the Islamic State, citing the regional threat from Iran.
  - The headquarters of the National Intelligence Service in central Baghdad is targeted in a drone strike, killing one police officer.
- 21 March – The Islamic Resistance in Iraq claims responsibility for targeting 27 American military bases in Iraq and across the region over the past 24 hours.
- 23 March – Kata'ib Hezbollah says that it will extend its pause on strikes on the United States embassy in Baghdad for five more days.
- 24 March – Fifteen PMF fighters, including a commander, are killed in a US airstrike on a PMF base in Al Anbar Governorate.
- 25 March – Seven fighters are killed and 13 others are injured in a strike on a PMF base in Al Anbar Governorate, the second strike on the same base in two consecutive days.
- 31 March – American journalist Shelly Kittleson is abducted in Baghdad.

=== April ===
- April 1 – The Iraq national football team wins against Bolivia in the 2026 FIFA World Cup intercontinental playoffs in Mexico, qualifying for the World Cup for the first time in 40 years.
- April 3 – Pro-Iran supporters in Baghdad gather to protest against the Iran war.
- April 6 – Two people are killed in an Iranian drone strike on the village of Zarka Zoy in Darashakran District, Erbil Governorate.
- April 7 – Kata'ib Hezbollah announces the release of American journalist Shelly Kittleson, who was kidnapped by gunmen in Baghdad on 31 March, on condition that she leave Iraq.
- April 10 – Iraqi airspace is opened to civilian flights after being closed for around 40 days.
- April 11 – 2026 Iraqi presidential election: Nizar Amidi is elected by parliament as the new president.
- April 20 – The Rabia border crossing with Syria reopens for the first time since 2011.
- April 27 – The Coordination Framework nominates Ali al-Zaidi as their candidate for prime minister.

=== May ===
- May 3 – Iraq offers significant discounts on its Basrah crude oil leaving the Al Başrah Oil Terminal and exiting the Strait of Hormuz.
- May 7 – The ministry of oil announces the discovery of a new oil field in Najaf Governorate, near the Iraq–Saudi Arabia border.
- May 14 – Parliament partially approves Ali al-Zaidi's cabinet, agreeing to 14 cabinet positions and officially swearing in al-Zaidi as prime minister.
- May 30 — An American and a British soldier die in a training accident at an airbase in Erbil.

=== June ===
- June 1 – A cargo vessel near Umm Qasr Port is struck by two explosions.
- June 2 – Asaib Ahl al-Haq and Kata'ib al-Imam Ali announce a plan to put weaponry under Iraqi governmental control.
- June 7 –
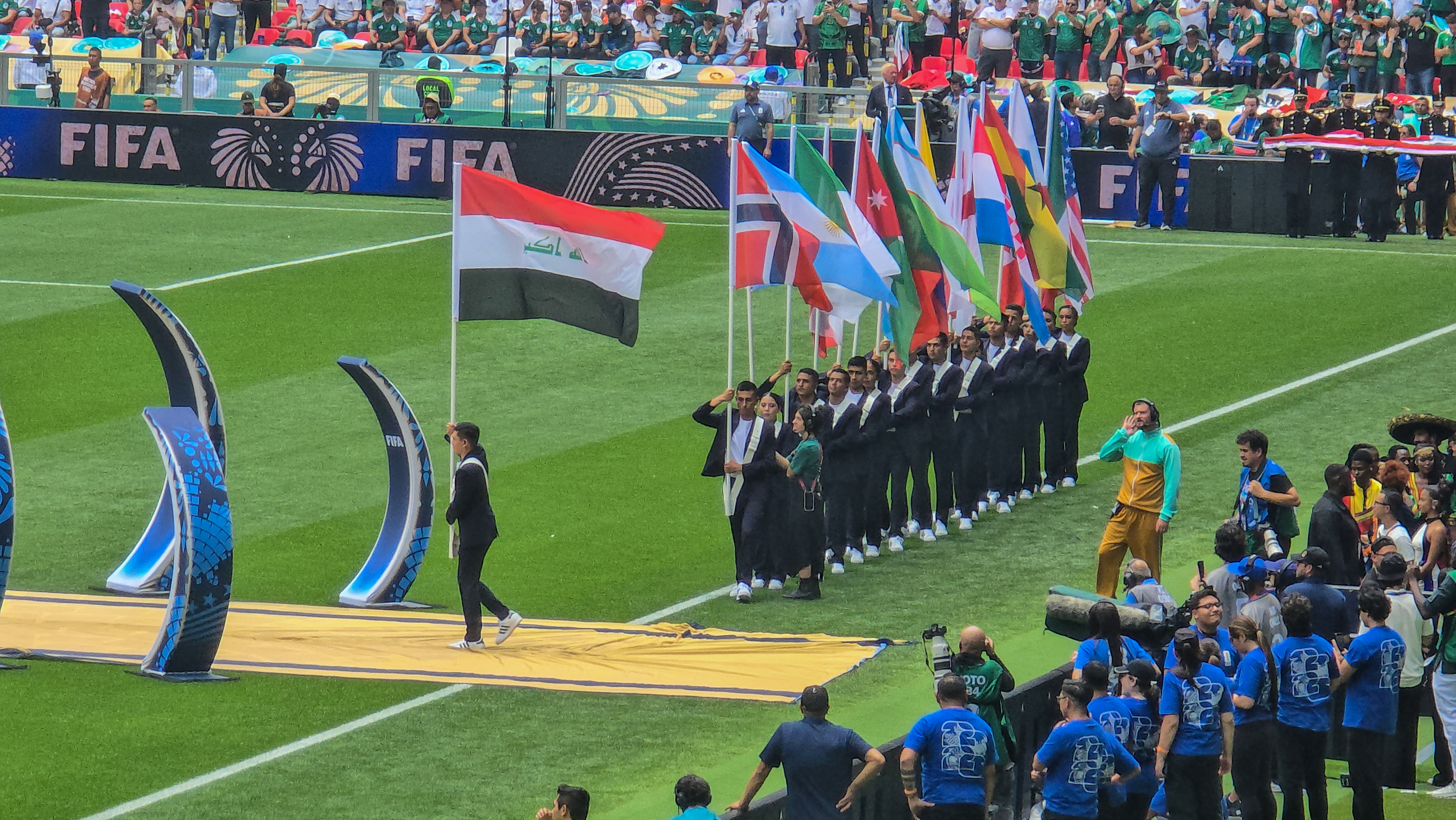
  The Iraqi flag is flown during the World Cup opening ceremony
  - A bus crash near Nasiriyah kills at least 21 people and injures another 19.
  - Aviation authorities announce the closure of Iraqi airspace for 72 hours citing concerns over civilian aircraft's safety.
- June 11 - June 26 – The Iraqi national football team competes in the FIFA world cup group stage and leaves after losing to Norway, France and Senegal.
- June 28 - Iraqi Counterterrorism service and military raids the green zone to arrest politician in financial corruption cases

=== July ===
- 13-14 July – Prime Minister Al-Zaidi heads a large delegation on his first international visit to the United states and meets with Donald Trump.
- 17 July –The US-led alliance intercepts several drones above Erbil.
- 24 July – The United States Trade Representative Jamieson Greer imposes a 12.5% tariff on Iraq, citing the presence of alleged forced labour in the supply chain. The United States Government also imposes tariffs ranging between 10 and 12.5% on 59 other countries.
- 29 July – Saudi Arabia and the United States carry out joint air strikes targeting PMF bases in Iraq killing at least 20 and wounding 32 militia members in retaliation for drone attacks on Saudi energy infrastructure that originated from inside Iraq.

=== August ===
- 1 August – Iraq signs a one-year exportation agreement with Turkey to export 750 thousand barrels of petroleum through the Kirkuk–Ceyhan pipeline.
- 9 August – Authorities arrest Axis of Resistance members, an armed cell with connections to Iran.
- 12 August – Prime Minister Ali al-Zaidi states that the US military will withdraw from Iraq by 30 September, bringing an end to a presence that began with the 2003 invasion against former President Saddam Hussein.
- 17 August – The office of the Prime Minister of the Kurdistan Region is attacked by Iranian drones. Iran calls the incident a "false flag" attack.
- 27 August – A brigadier general and a policeman is killed, with four others injured in a shootout while attempting to remove violations at the Al-Dora district in Baghdad.

=== September ===
- 11 September – Saudi Arabia closes the East-West Crude Oil Pipeline following a drone attack carried out from Maysan Governorate, resulting in the Iraqi government dismissing the military commander in the said area.
- 24 September –
  - Turkey agrees to gradually transfer Bashiqa base to Iraq.
  - Authorities announce that the US transferred the diplomatic and logistics hub at the Baghdad International Airport to Iraq prior to the withdrawal of American soldiers from the country.
- 25 September – Three airports suspend Iranian flights beginning that day, following the imposition of sanctions by the US Treasury Department against dozens of companies and entities linked to Iran's aviation sector.
- 26 September – Iraq and the US reach an "understanding" regarding dollar shipments.
- 29 September – Amid the 2026 Strait of Hormuz crisis, Iraq starts importing gasoline through the Syrian port of Baniyas.
- 30 September –
  - The Trump administration concludes the withdrawal of US soldiers from their final bases in Iraq, marking the end of the US-led coalition's war against ISIL.
  - Iraq celebrates 'Sovereignty Day,' a national holiday commemorating the withdrawal of US troops from the country.

=== October ===
- 1 October – Following the conclusion of the US-led coalition's mission in Iraq, Iraq grants Iran-backed armed groups until 30 June 2027, to disarm.
- 2 October – Prime Minister Zaidi announces that the country has obtained an exemption from the US that allows Iranian airlines, except Mahan Air, to operate 40 flights per day to and from Al Najaf International Airport.
- 6 October – A policeman is killed and four others are injured in an Islamic State attack on a federal police site in the vicinity of Hawija.
- 7 October – The Central Bank of Iraq devalues the Iraqi dinar.
- 9 October – The government announces a ban on Waze due to its Israeli origin, effective 2027.
- 17 October – A Popular Mobilization Forces member is killed and four others are injured in a blast at the group's headquarters in Baghdad.
- 27 October – An court sentences seven French nationals to long prison terms for membership in the Islamic State.

=== November ===
- 6 November – The Patriotic Union of Kurdistan announces that it is leaving the Kurdistan Regional Government.
- 8 November – A drone attack at the Khor Mor Gas Field in Kurdistan Region halts production.
- 10 November – Ahmed al-Alwani, a former Iraqi MP, is assassinated in Beirut.
- 14 November –
  - After Kataib Hezbollah refused to allow the first investigative team to visit Jurf al-Sakhar, Prime Minister al-Zaidi designates a PMF official to lead the probe into allegations of oil smuggling in the area.
  - Following an investigation into suspicions of oil smuggling in the Jurf al-Sakher, Prime Minister al-Zaidi dismisses nine officials and gives Kata'ib Hezbollah a deadline to cede security control of the region to federal forces.
- 16 November –
  - Prime Minister al-Zaidi orders the ground forces to enter Jurf al-Sakher.
  - Iraq bans Telegram app due to national security concerns.
- 18 November – The Karkh Criminal Court in Baghdad sentences six French nationals, including Thomas Barnouin, to life imprisonment for membership in the Islamic State, raising the total number of French citizens convicted in the trials to 16.
- 19 November – Following the investigation into oil smuggling and subsequent mediation in Baghdad by Quds Force commander Esmail Qaani, the Iraqi government reaches an agreement with Kata'ib Hezbollah to deploy federal security forces into Jurf al-Sakhar.
- 20 November – To take over security control and start the gradual redeployment of Kata'ib Hezbollah, Iraqi security forces and units of the Popular Mobilization Forces deploy to Jurf al-Sakhar.
- 21 November – A fire at a power station in Basra kills four people and injures 30 others.

== Holidays ==
- 1 January – New Year's Day
- 6 January – Iraqi Army Day
- 18-23 March – Eid al-Fitr
- 9 April – Liberation Day
- 1 May – Labour Day
- 26–30 May – Eid al-Adha
- 16 June – Islamic New Year
- 25 June – Ashura
- 14 July – Republic Day
- 5 August – Arba'in
- 25 August – Mawlid
- 30 September-3 October – Sovereignty Days.
- 3 October – National day
- 10 December – Victory Day
- 25 December – Christmas Day

== Art and entertainment ==
- List of Iraqi submissions for the Academy Award for Best International Feature Film

== Deaths ==
- 2 March – Yanar Mohammed, feminist and activist (b.1960)
- 8 March – Lutfiya al-Dulaimi, writer and journalist. (b.1939)
- 2 April – Tahir Jalil Habbush, intelligence official (Habbush letter), director of the Iraqi Intelligence Service (1995–2003) (b.1950)
- 4 April – Sajida Obaed, 68, singer. (b.1957)
- 21 April – Hussein Mohammed Hadi Al-Sadr, Shia cleric and scholar.(b.1945)

== See also ==
- Timeline of Iraq history
- Years in Iraq
