= 2020 in Iraq =

- Decades: 2000s; 2010s; 2020s
- See also: Other events of 2020; List of years in Iraq

Events in the year 2020 in Iraq.

== Incumbents ==
- President: Barham Salih
- Prime Minister: Adil Abdul-Mahdi (until May 7); Mustafa Al-Kadhimi (from May 7)

== Events ==
=== January ===
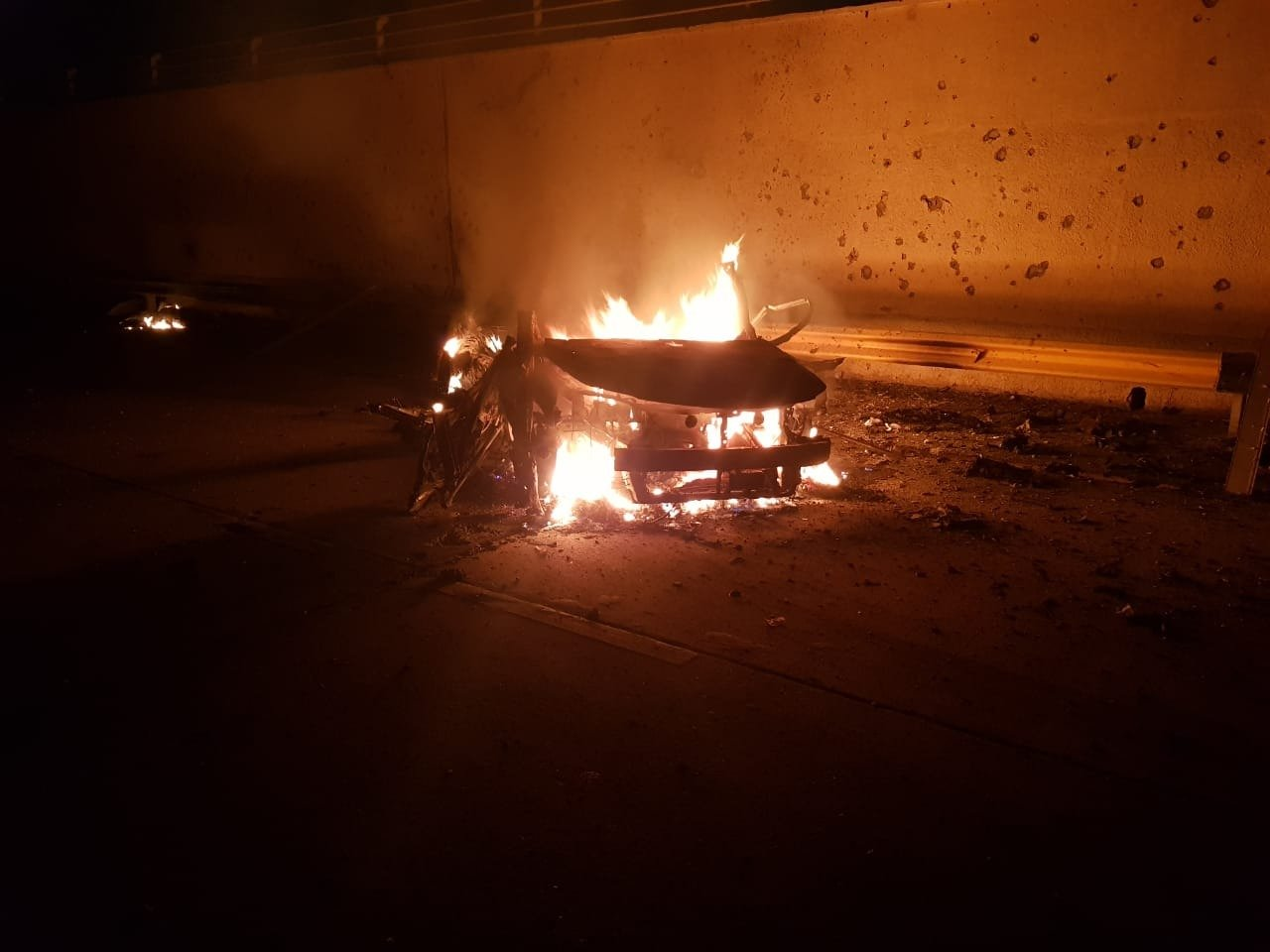
- Assassination of Qasem Soleimani, Baghdad 2020
  3 January – A U.S. coordinated airstrike near Baghdad International Airport kills Iranian military official Qasem Soleimani and Abu Mahdi al-Muhandis, deputy chief of the Popular Mobilization Forces.
- 8 January – Iran's Islamic Revolutionary Guard Corps launched ballistic missiles at the Ayn al-Asad airbase in Al Anbar Governorate, western Iraq and Erbil, Iraqi Kurdistan, in response to the killing of Major General Qasem Soleimani by a United States drone strike.
- 12 January – Hundreds of Iraqis attend protests over deaths of two reporters in Basra.
- 21 January – An Iraqi female protester was shot dead by government forces. 49-year-old Jannat Madhi was working in a medical team giving help to wounded demonstrators. She was shot around mid-night in the Iraqi southern port of Basra.

=== February ===
- 1 February – President Barham Salih nominates Mohammad Allawi as new prime minister.
- 5 February – Eight people were shot dead in Najaf after supporters of Muqtada al-Sadr raided an anti-government protest camp.
- 24 February – COVID-19 pandemic in Iraq, the first case of COVID-19 is recorded in Najaf Governorate.

=== March ===
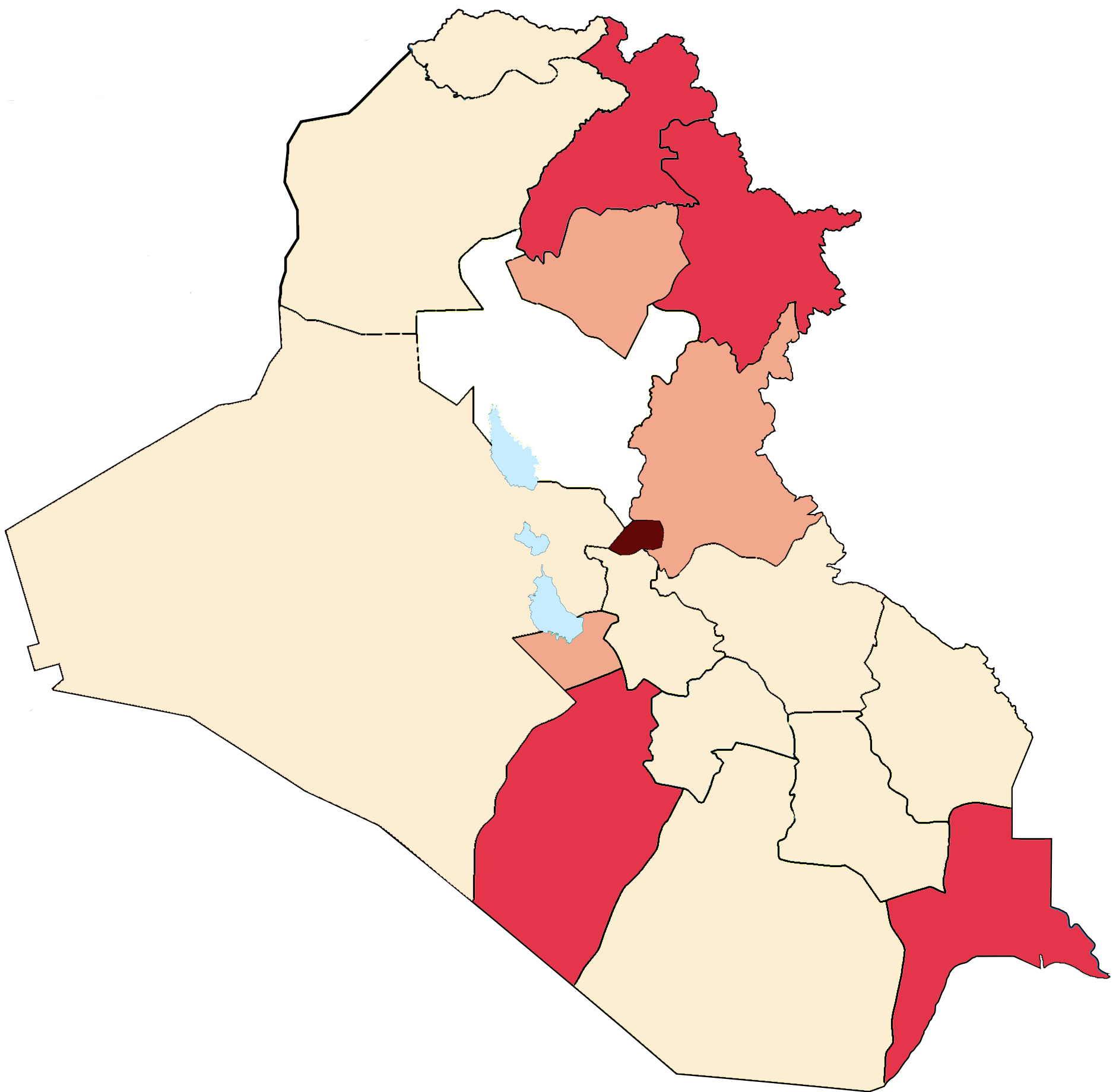
COVID-19 Cases in Iraq up to March 25,2020

- 1 March – Prime minister candidate Mohammad Allawi withdraws his candidacy. Deadlock over forming a new government continues.
- 5 March – First two COVID-19 related deaths reported in Baghdad Iraq, with a 3rd potential death in the Kurdistan region.
- 11 March – 2 rockets hit the Taji military camp in Baghdad, killing 2 American soldiers, one British soldier and wounding another 12.
- 17 March –
  - The Iraqi government announces lockdowns to combat the COVID-19 pandemic.The protests that have lasted since October 2019 disperse for fears increasing the spread of the virus.
  - President Barham Salih nominates ِAdnan Al-Zurfi as new prime minister.

=== April ===
- 9 April – Adnan Al-Zurfi withdraws his candidacy for prime minister, Mustafa Al-Kadhimi is selected to replace him.

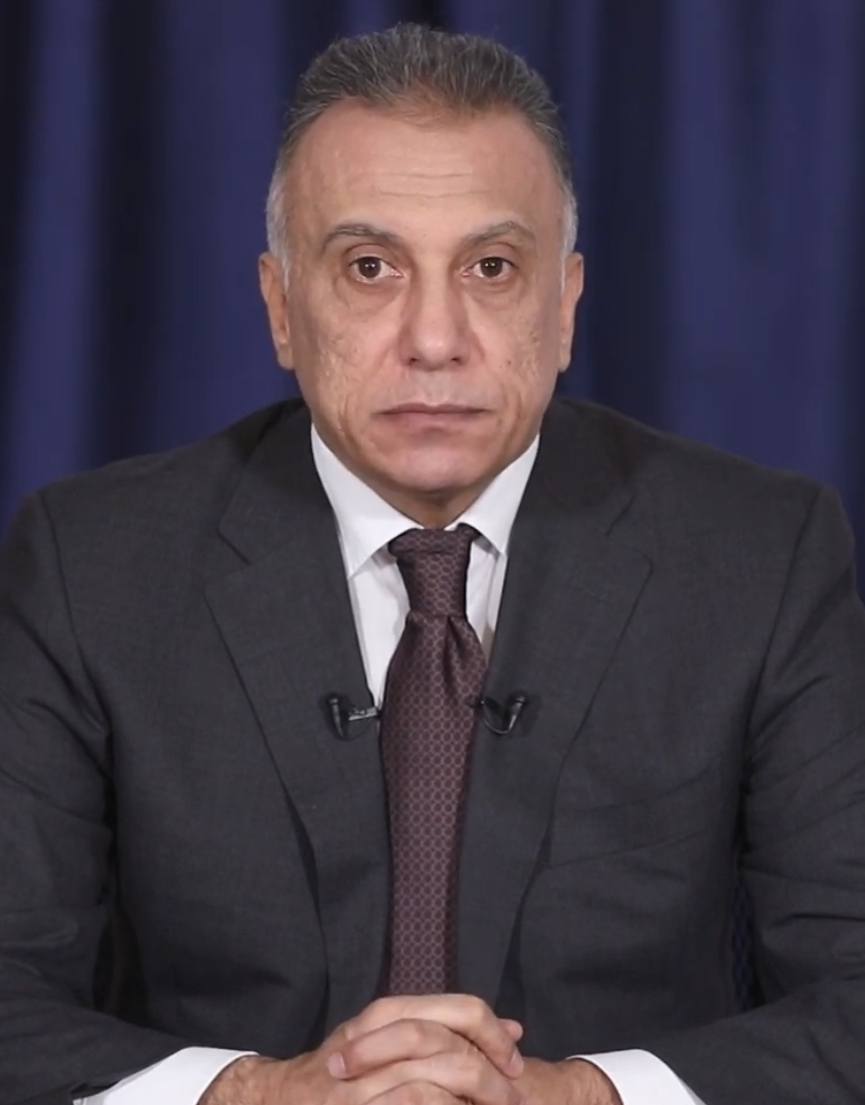
Iraqi prime Mustafa Al-Kadhimi assumes office May 2020

=== May ===
- 7 May – The Iraqi parliament approves the cabinet of Mustafa Al-Kadhimi, ending months of political deadlock.

=== July ===
- 6 July – Historian and researcher Hisham al-Hashimi is assassinated by unknown gunmen.
- 23 July – Iraqi airports are reopened with strict health guidelines after weeks of closure due to COVID-19.

=== August ===
- 20 August – Iraqi prime minister Mustafa Al-Kadhimi completes his first official visit to Washington, where he met with American president Donald Trump and discussed American troops presence in Iraq.

=== September ===
- 28 September – A wayward rocket intended for US troops posted at Baghdad airport hit and killed five children and two women all belonging to the same family. When the rockets hit, the children were playing outside their home. The latest attack intended to strike American interests was one of around 40 since early August. Several senior officials attended the funeral in a move to calm the tense situation.
- The World Bank said Iraq's poverty rate could double to 40 percent by the end of this year and that youth unemployment, currently standing at 36 percent, could rise to even higher numbers.

=== October ===
- 1 October – Thousands of demonstrators gather in Baghdad and other cities to commemorate one year anniversary of the 2019 protests and demand real political change.
- 31 October – A pipeline explosion near the city of Samawah in southern Iraq results in at least 3 people killed and more than 50 wounded.

=== November ===
- 18 November –
  - Iraqi Yazidis select their new religious leader, Sheikh Ali Ilyas, in a ceremony at the city of Lalish.
  - Iraq and Saudi Arabia reopen the Arar border crossing, 30 years after it was closed.
- 27 November – Three killed and dozens wounded in the city of Nasiriyah, as supporters of Moqtada al-Sadr clashed with anti-government protesters.

=== December ===
- 2 December – Anti-government and anti-corruption protests break out in the city of Sulaymaniyah in Iraqi Kurdistan.
- 22 December – American president Donald Trump pardons 4 Blackwater contractors who were convicted for killing 14 Iraqi civilians at the Nisour Square massacre in 2007. The pardons sparked outrage in Iraq and elsewhere.

== Deaths ==
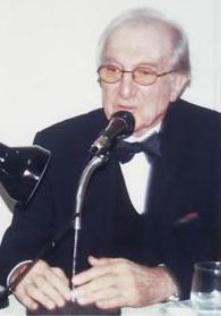
Rifat Chadirji

- 3 January – Abu Mahdi al-Muhandis, military commander (b. 1954).
- 10 April – Rifat Chadirji, architect.
- 16 May – Mizban Khadr al-Hadi, general and politician.
- 12 June – Ali Hadi, footballer (b. 1967).
- 14 June – Tawfiq al-Yasiri, politician.
- 21 June – Ahmed Radhi, footballer (b. 1964).
- 22 June – Nouri Dhiab, footballer (b. 1943).
- 24 June– Mohammed Yaseen Mohammed, weightlifter (b. 1963).
- 6 July – Hisham al-Hashimi, historian and researcher (b. 1973).
- 19 July – Sultan Hashim Ahmad al-Tai, former Defense Minister.
- 28 July – Ahlam Wehbi, singer and actress (b. 1938).
- 19 August – Reham Yacoub, doctor and civilian rights activist (b. 1991).
- 11 September – Nadhim Shaker, footballer (b. 1958).
- 1 October – Khurto Hajji Ismail, Yazidi religious leader. (b.1933)
- 25 October – Izzat Ibrahim al-Douri, politician (b. 1942).
- 18 November – Firsat Sofi, Governor of Erbil (b. 1978).

== See also ==
=== Country overviews ===
- Iraq
- History of Iraq
- History of modern Iraq
- Outline of Iraq
- Government of Iraq
- Politics of Iraq
- Timeline of Iraq history
- Years in Iraq

=== Related timelines for current period ===
- 2020
- 2020 in politics and government
- 2020s
