= Timeline of the Iraqi insurgency (2024) =

This is a timeline of events during the Islamic State insurgency in Iraq (2017–present) in 2024.

== Chronology ==
=== January ===
- In January 2024, 3 Iraqi security personnel, 26 ISIS militants and 3 civilians were killed.

=== February ===
- In February 2024, 3 civilians were killed and 2 were injured.

=== March ===
- In March 2024, 4 Iraqi security personnel, 13 ISIS militants and 4 civilians were killed.

=== April ===
- In April 2024, 10 civilians and Iraqi security personnel, 10 ISIS militants were killed. A further 11 ISIS militants were executed by the Iraqi government in prison.

=== May ===
- May 13 – Five Iraqi soldiers, including a colonel, were killed and another five were wounded in a suspected ISIS attack on an eastern Iraq army post.
- In May 2024, 3 Civilians, 18 Iraqi Security personnel and 2 ISIS militants were killed. A further 11 ISIS militants were executed in prisons.

=== June ===
- In June 2024, 2 civilians, 2 Iraqi security personnel and 25 ISIS militants were killed. A further 63 ISIS militants were executed in Nasariya prison.

=== July ===
- In July 2024, 2 civilians, 7 Iraqi security personnel and 11 ISIS militants were killed. A further 10 ISIS militants were executed in prisons.

=== August ===
- 31 August: 2024 Anbar raid: In an operation conducted by the US special forces along with Iraqi security forces in western Iraq killed about 15 ISIS militants armed with grenades and explosive belts, the operation also led to the injury of 7 US personnel.
- In August 2024, 9 civilians, 6 Iraqi security personnel and 15 ISIS militants were killed.

=== September ===
- In September 2024, 4 civilians, 4 Iraqi security personnel and 12 ISIS militants were killed. A further 21 ISIS militants were executed in prison.

=== October ===
- October 2 – 4 Iraqi Security personnel were killed and 3 injured in an ambush by ISIS militants in Kirkuk Governorate.
- October 22 – Prime Minister Mohammed Shia' Al Sudani announces the death of 9 Islamic State senior members, including its leader for Iraq, in a military operation in Saladin Governorate.
- In October 2024, 5 civilians, 6 Iraqi security personnel and 50 ISIS militants were killed.

=== November ===
- In November 2024, 3 Iraqi Security personnel, 18 ISIS militants were killed, and 5 civilians were wounded.

=== December ===
- In December 2024, 3 Iraqi Security personnel, 5 civilians, and 16 ISIS militants were killed.

== See also ==
- Timeline of the Islamic State (2024)
