= Iraqi literature =

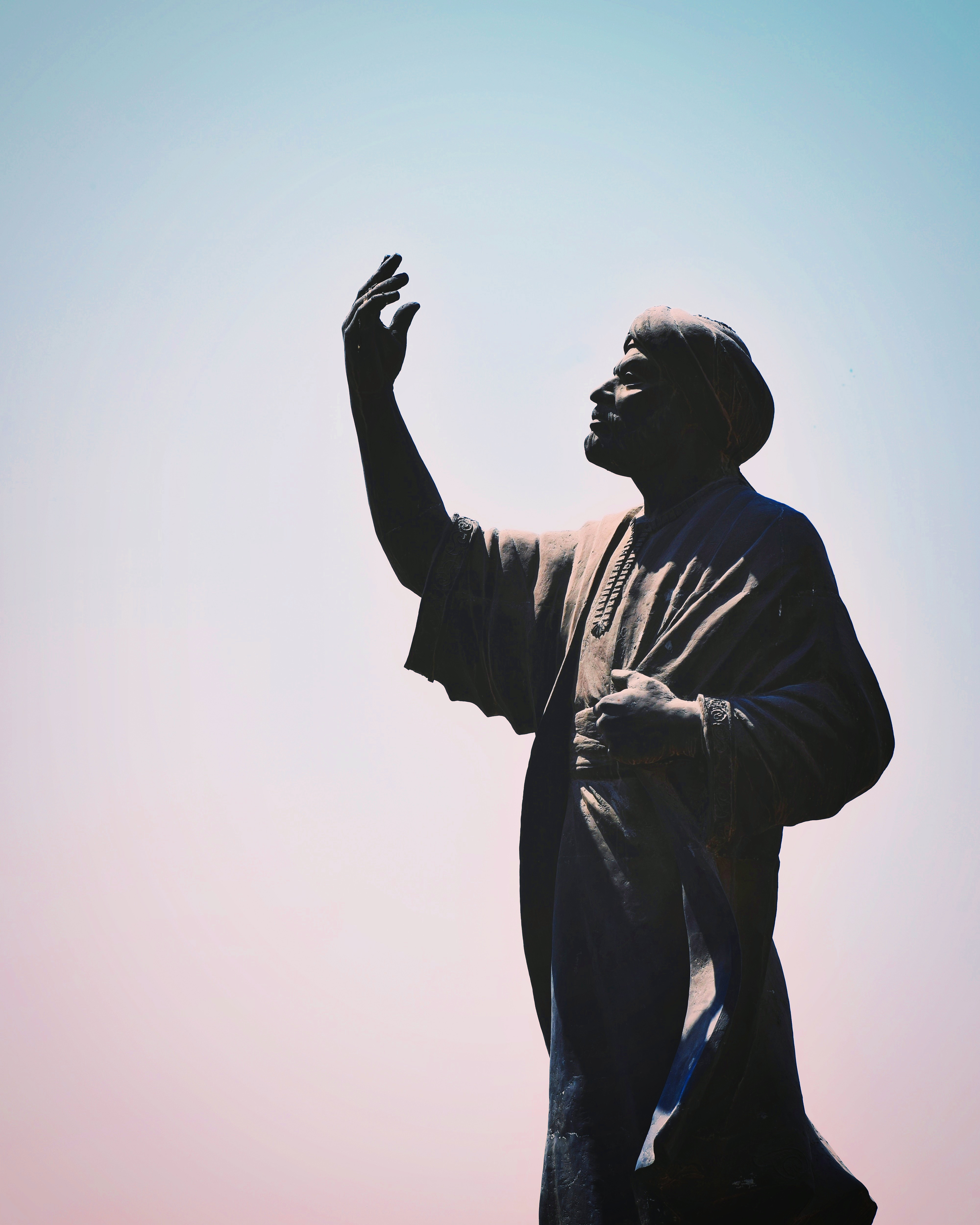
Al-Mutanabbi, an Iraqi poet

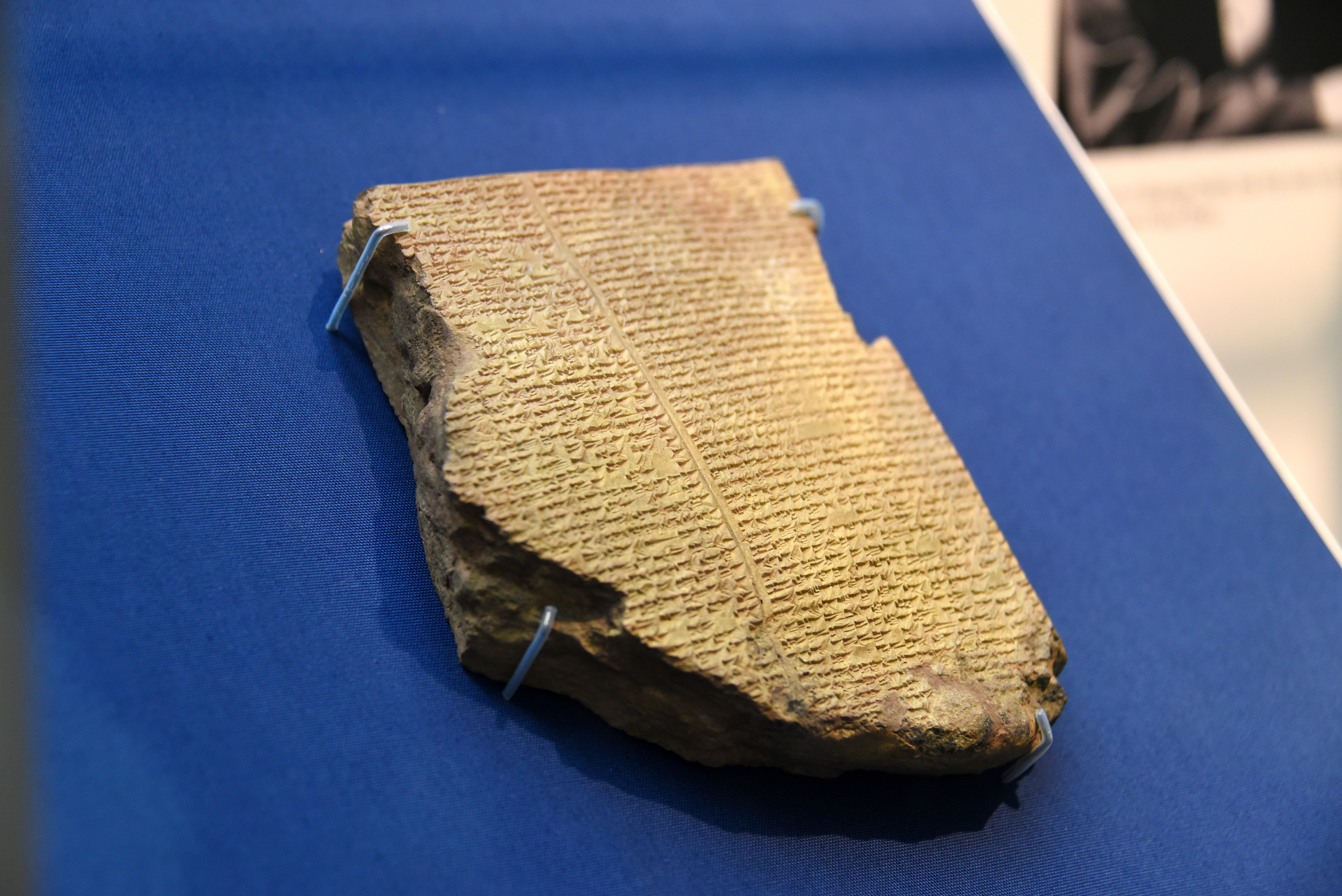
Epic of Gilgamesh, an epic poem from ancient Mesopotamia, regarded as the earliest surviving notable literature, British Museum.

Iraqi literature or Mesopotamian literature dates back to Sumerian times, which constitutes the earliest known corpus of recorded literature, including the religious writings and other traditional stories maintained by the Sumerian civilization and largely preserved by the later Akkadian and Babylonian empire. Mesopotamian civilization flourished as a result of the mixture of these cultures and has been called Mesopotamian or Babylonian literature in allusion to the geographical territory that such cultures occupied in the Middle East between the banks of the Tigris and Euphrates rivers.

As of 2024, the Iraqi Writers Union reported having 3,496 registered members, up from 2,006 in 1998, including 123 older members whose membership cards were renewed during the same period. Its activities included at least 300 books and magazines published annually, 1,000 literary sessions held per year across Baghdad and the provinces and at least 10 major literary festivals organized annually.

== Ancient era ==
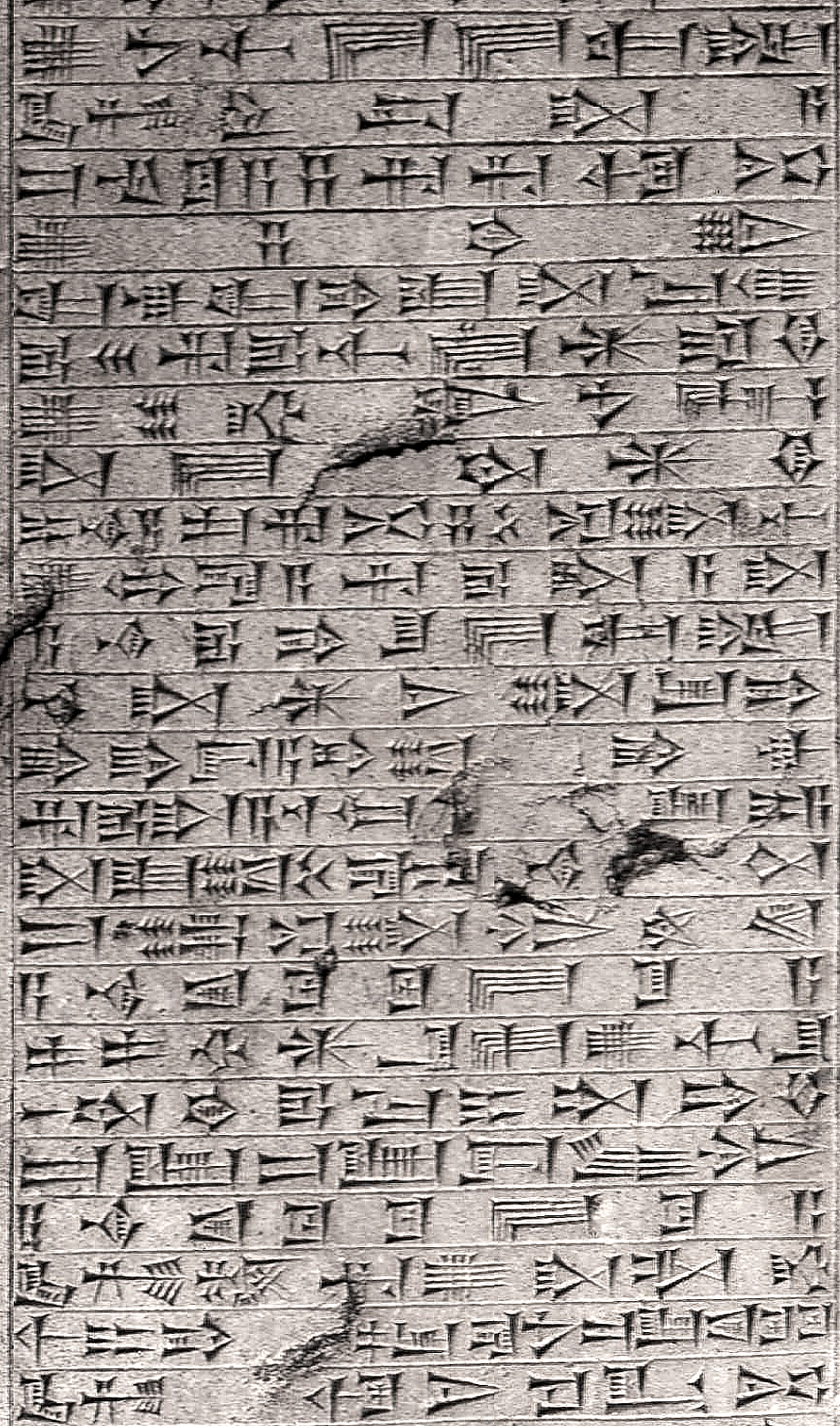
An Akkadian inscription

The Sumerian literature is unique because the Sumerian language itself is unique in its kind because it does not belong to any known linguistic root. Its appearance began with symbols of the things denoting it, then it turned with time to the cuneiform line, and later spread during the third millennium BC. All of them were in Mesopotamia, but they were affected by historical events, so they lost much of their importance, and became the language of religious rituals, after the Semitic Akkadian language overcame them. However, there are texts that date back to after the advent of Christianity. The two languages coincided, and they coexisted for many decades, and written traces appeared in each of them. Including the Epic of Gilgamesh, which was originally classified in Sumerian and reached the Akkadian.

The Sumerians wrote many mythical and epic texts dealing with creation issues, the emergence of the world, the gods, descriptions of the heavens, and the lives of heroes in the wars that broke out between the nomads and the urbanites. They also deal with religious teachings, moral advice, astrology, legislation, and history. In this same line Akkadian literature also proceeded, so that the two languages converged, and sometimes they shared the same subject.

== Pre-modern era ==
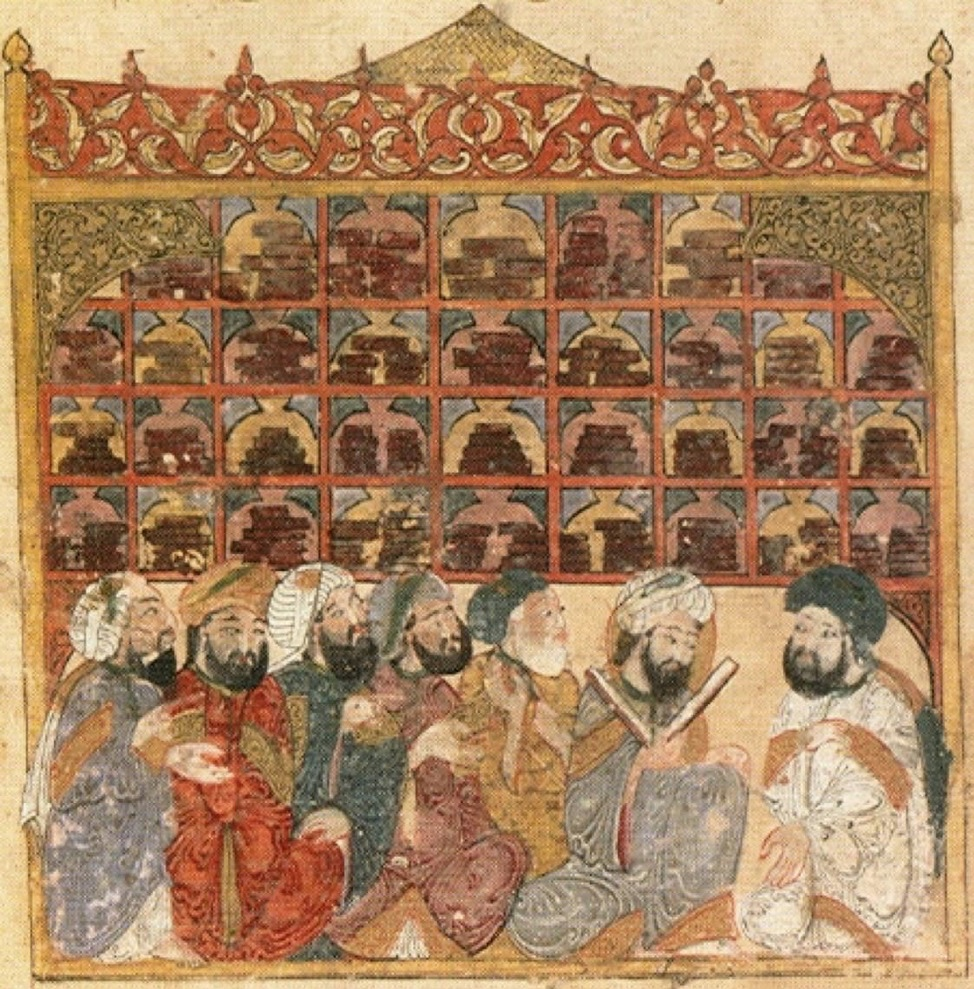
Scholars at an Abbasid library. Maqamat of al-Hariri Illustration by Yahyá al-Wasiti, 1237

=== Abbasid ===
In the beginning of the Islamic Golden Age, during the Abbasid period, in which Baghdad was the capital, the House of Wisdom in Baghdad, which was a public academy and intellectual center hosted numerous scholars and writers such as Al-Jahiz and Omar Khayyam. A number of stories in the One Thousand and One Nights feature the Abbasid caliph Harun al-Rashid. Al-Hariri of Basra was a notable literary figure of this period.

=== Manuscripts ===
Most of the Abbasid works, as well those produced in modern-day Iraq from later periods, remain in manuscript form; according to a 2014 survey published by Dar al-Ta'sil, Iraq is estimated to possess approximately 100,000 Arabic and Islamic manuscripts. Roughly half of these are held by the Iraqi Manuscripts House (Dar al-Makhtutat) in Baghdad, while the remainder are dispersed among public, private, and religious libraries throughout the country.

== Modern era ==
=== 20th century ===
As stated by Ibrahim al-Durubi in Al-Baghdadiyun, Akhbaruhum Wa Majalisuhum the important figures in the founding of 20th-century Iraqi literature included Ma'ruf al-Rusafi, Daisy Al-Amir and Anastase-Marie al-Karmali.

In the late 1970s, a period of economic upturn, prominent writers in Iraq were provided with an apartment and car by Saddam Hussein's government, and were guaranteed at least one publication per year. In exchange, literature was expected to express and galvanise support for the ruling Ba'ath Party. Under Ba'athist governance, cultural production and publishing in Iraq were largely centralized under the Ministry of Culture and Media, which oversaw broadcasting, cinema, theatre, and a network of state publishing houses, including the creation of specialized publishing bodies which produced books, magazines, and newspapers. Children’s publishing formed a distinct part of state cultural output. Dar al-Thaqafa lil-Atfal published 110 children’s books between 1975 and 1979, rising to 324 titles during the second half of the 1980s. Available figures indicate a substantial volume of state publishing: between 1975 and 1979, the Iraqi government published 5,279 books, followed by 5,837 books from 1980 to 1984. Output expanded further between 1985 and 1989, with 7,309 books published, and reached 1,875 books in 1990 alone, the highest annual total recorded during the period. Official reports also stated that total publication circulation increased from 25 million copies in 1974 to 240 million in 1981. Prior to the imposition of international sanctions in 1991, Iraq exported books valued at approximately 1.5 million Iraqi dinars and newspapers worth 500,000 dinars, and participated in numerous international book fairs.

The Iran–Iraq War (1980-1988) fuelled a demand for patriotic literature, but also pushed a number of writers into exile. According to Najem Wali, during this period, "[e]ven those who chose to quit writing saw themselves forced to write something that did not rile the dictator, because even silence was considered a crime." According to human rights documentation, over 500 journalists, writers, poets and intellectuals were executed or killed by the Ba'athist regime and its security apparatus between 1968 and 2003, and hundreds more were forced into exile. From the late 1980s onwards, Iraqi exile literature developed with writers whose "rejection of dominant ideology and [whose] resistance to the wars in Iraq compelled them to formulate a 'brutally raw realism' characterized by a shocking sense of modernity".

Late 20th-century Iraqi literature has been marked by writers such as Saadi Youssef, Fadhil Al-Azzawi, Mushin Al-Ramli, Salah Al-Hamdani and Abdul Rahman Majeed al-Rubaie.

=== 21st century ===
In the 21st century, following the 2003 Iraq War, the novel genre "flourished and produced hundreds of novels within a short period", concentrating on issues such as invasion, sectarianism and other social issues affecting the country. In a polarized context, some militant groups had made lists of more than 1,000 writers who had to be targeted, even killed, because they had supposedly collaborated with Saddam Hussein.

==== Newspapers and magazines ====
By the late 2010s, Iraq maintained a diverse print media sector. Government statistics indicate that between 2015 and 2019 the country had around 58–60 general-interest magazines, approximately 57–60 scientific journals (both peer-reviewed and non-reviewed), and about 138–139 newspapers in circulation. Prior to 1990, Iraq had also developed a notable tradition of cultural and scholarly periodicals, including Majallat Somar, Majallat al-Majmaʿ al-ʿIlmi al-ʿIraqi, and Majallat al-Turath al-Shaʿbi, which contributed significantly to Arab intellectual and cultural life.

=== Statistics ===
Publishing in Iraq expanded during the late 2010s. The number of books published increased from 7,650 in 2015 to 7,900 in 2016, 8,050 in 2017, 8,200 in 2018, and 8,400 in 2019. In terms of subject distribution, publications in 2015 included 780 works in general knowledge, 830 in philosophy and psychology, 1,875 in religion, 430 in social sciences, 350 in languages, 480 in natural sciences, 550 in applied sciences, 700 in arts, 1,950 in literature, and 2,350 in geography and history. By 2019, these figures had increased to 880 in general knowledge, 890 in philosophy and psychology, 1,660 in religion, 490 in social sciences, 370 in languages, 505 in natural sciences, 565 in applied sciences, 730 in arts, 2,300 in literature, and 2,550 in geography and history.

Arabic accounted for 97% of publications in 2015, compared with 2% in English and 1% in French. Translations into Arabic were primarily from English, French, Russian, Chinese, and Japanese. Translation activity was undertaken by institutions such as the Dar al-Maʾmun Ministry of Culture, Bayt al-Hikmah, Dar al-Kutub al-ʿIlmiyya, and Dar Thaqafat al-Tifl.

Academic publishing also expanded, with Iraqi universities increasing their output. In 2015, the Iraqi Academic Scientific Journals (IASJ) platform was introduced to facilitate access to research, and by late 2020 it included 310 periodicals from 75 academic partners and a total of 181,019 studies. Historical cultural journals such as al-Mawrid, al-Aqlam, Adabiyah, and al-Turath al-Shaʿbi also resumed publication, aided by digitization and open access.

== See also ==
- Iraqi writers
- Iraqi novels
- Assyro-Babylonian literature
- Sumerian literature
- Culture of Iraq

== Sources ==
- Aẓb, Khaled (2023). Publishing in the Arab World 2015–2019 (PDF) (Report). Translated by Haj, Yasmin; Tewfik, Nourhan. Arab Publishers Association; Literature Across Frontiers. Archived from the original (PDF) on 6 March 2026.
