= Ahmed Abdul-Ghafur =

Iraqi jurist, scholar, and politician (1955–2024)

Head of the Sunni Endowment Office
- In office July 2005 – November 2013
- Preceded by: Adnan al-Dulaimi
- Succeeded by: Mahmud al-Sumaydai

Personal details
- Born: 1955 Samarra, Iraq
- Died: 24 February 2024 (aged 68–69) Amman, Jordan
- Education: Arab History and Scientific Heritage Institute
- Occupation: Jurist; Scholar

Ahmed Abdul-Ghafur (Arabic: أحمد عبد الغفور; 1955 – 24 February 2024) was an Iraqi jurist, Islamic scholar, and politician. He served as head of the Sunni Endowment Office from 2005 to 2013.

Born in Samarra in 1955, Abdul-Ghafur studied Islamic law in Baghdad and earned advanced degrees in Islamic history, culminating in a Ph.D. in 2003 from the Institute of Arab History and Scientific Heritage. He became known for his sermons, particularly at the Imam Al-Ghazali Mosque in Samarra and later at the Umm Al-Qura Mosque in Baghdad.

During his tenure at the Sunni Endowment, he was an outspoken critic of extremist violence. In one sermon he condemned attacks on civilians, stating, "The real resistance should only target the occupiers... Everybody should speak out against such inhumane acts."

Her survived multiple threats to his life, including a suicide bombing attempt, which he publicly attributed to al-Qaeda.

Abdul-Ghafur died in Amman on 24 February 2024 after suffering from terminal illness.
