= Ban Ziad Tariq =

Iraqi psychiatric (1991–2025)

- بان زياد طارق
- Born: 1991; Basra, Iraq
- Died: 4 August 2025 (aged 33–34); Basra, Iraq
- Cause of death: Suicide; disputed
- Body discovered: 4 August 2025, Home
- Citizenship: Iraq
- Education: University of Basrah
- Occupation: psychiatrist
- Years active: 2015–2025

Ban Ziad Tariq (1991 – 4 August 2025) was an Iraqi psychiatrist from Basra. Her death sparked widespread controversy in public health of Iraq, and social media after she was found dead in her home under mysterious circumstances. The Supreme Judicial Council of Iraq later declared her death was a suicide.

== Early life and education ==
Ban Ziad Tariq was born in 1991 in Basra, a port city in southern Iraq. She studied medicine at the University of Basrah and graduated as a general practitioner in 2015, then specialized in psychiatry and psychotherapy. According to her colleagues she was known for her professional competence and dedication to patient care. She also participated in local medical conferences, the final days of her life which occurred shortly before her death.

== Death ==
On 4 August 2025, Tariq was found dead in her home in Basra under mysterious circumstances. Initial reports showing photos of cuts and bruises on her body raised widespread suspicions that she had been murdered. Her mother told local media Tariq was under work pressure.

Iraqi Prime Minister Mohammed Shia' al-Sudani ordered the formation of an investigative committee and transferred the case to capital Baghdad for forensic and criminal investigations. A suspected family member was also temporarily detained.

On 18 August 2025, Iraqi Supreme Judicial Council issued an official statement saying that criminal investigations had proven that her death was the result of suicide, based on evidence including a handwritten note and the absence of signs of sexual assault, strangulation, or poisoning. Accordingly, the judicial file was permanently closed.

=== Reactions ===
The death of Ban Ziad Tariq sparked widespread outrage on Arab social media and the old media. Protests erupted in Basra, demanding a transparent and impartial investigation. Her fellow doctors and relatives expressed doubt about the suicide hypothesis, as her body was brutally tortured and mutilated. They additionally alleged that she showed no signs of depression or isolation. Notable feminist group, Iraqi Women's Network, demanded an independent investigation to ensure justice and transparency. A hall was named after her legacy in a Basra hospital.
