= Ghazwa Al-Khalidi =

Iraqi actress (1943–2025)

Ghazwa Al-Khalidi (Arabic: غزوة الخالدي; 19 January 1943 – 6 June 2025) was an Iraqi actress who began her career in 1965.

== Life and career ==
Al-Khalidi worked in various fields including theater, cinema, television, radio, and dramatic writing, and she also worked in radio from 1972. Her first appearance on stage was when she was still a student at the Institute of Fine Arts in 1965 in the play "The Flood".

Al-Khalidi had to leave Iraq and continued her acting and TV career in exile with focus on documenting the experience of Iraqis abroad. She died on 6 June 2025 in the United States.
