= Issam Al-Chalabi =

Iraqi politician (1942–2025)

- عصام الجلبي

Minister of Oil
- In office 28 February 1987 – 28 October 1990
- Preceded by: Qasim al-Uraibi
- Succeeded by: Hussein Kamel al-Majid

Personal details
- Born: 24 May 1942; Adhamiyah, Baghdad, Iraq
- Died: 8 February 2025 (aged 82); Amman, Jordan
- Education: University College London (BE)
- Occupation: Engineer

Issam Al-Chalabi (Arabic: عصام الجلبي; 24 May 1942 – 8 February 2025) was an Iraqi politician. He served as Minister of Oil from 1987 to 1990.

Al-Chalabi was born on 24 May 1942, and died in Amman, Jordan on 8 February 2025, at the age of 82.
