= Iyad Al-Taie =

Iraqi actor (1965–2025)

- Born: November 20, 1965; Baghdad, Iraq
- Died: October 3, 2025 (aged 59); Baghdad, Iraq
- Education: University of Baghdad
- Occupation: Actor

Iyad Al-Taie (Arabic: إياد الطائي) was an Iraqi actor who became well known for his role as "Sheikh Salam" in the television series The Wolves’ Shelter.

== Career ==
He began his acting career through school theater in 1975. A turning point in his artistic life came in 1990, when he was invited by director Imad Mohamed to participate in the first Youth Festival, where he won the Best Actor award. Following this achievement, he continued his career in both theater and television. Al-Taie held a diploma in management and accounting, as well as a bachelor's degree in performing arts. He was a member of the Iraqi Union of Playwrights and Theater Artists and also taught for a period at the Institute of Fine Arts.

== Works ==
=== Television ===
Television series
Year	Work	Role	Notes	Ref
1997	An Accident on the Cliff			
2000	Mr. Manawi			
2000	Days of Struggle			
2001	Characters Whom History Was Unjust To			
2001	Woman in Islam			
2002	Imam Al-Shafeie			
2002	The Last Farewell			
2004	The Claws			
2005	Hussein the Revolutionary and the Martyr			
2005	Candles of Khidr Elias			
2005	Breeze of the Past			
2007	The Curious of Baghdad			
2008	The Master			
2008	Oil			
2010	Reflection of the Past			
2011	Wolf's Shelter			
2011	The Story of a Baghdad Neighborhood			
2011	Years Under the Ashes			
2012	Ali Al-Wardi			
2012	Mrs. Salima			
2012	The Roadmap			
2012	Surviving in Iraq			
2013	Mohamed Al-Jawad			
2013	The Obvious Kidnapping			
2013	Al-Mutanabbi			
2013	Salman's Well			
2013	Southern Bleeding			
2013	Hafiz			
2014	Red Violet			
2015	Fires of Ash			
2015	Gate of Desire			
2019	Sour and Sweet			
2020	Group D2			
2020	General Anesthesia			
2020	Dreams of Years			
2021	Butterfly			
2021	Red Area			
2021	Angle Kick			
2022	Saleh's Girls			
2022	The Guardian			
2022	Astonishment			
2024	Spirit			
2025	Paradise			
2025	General Forgiveness			
2025	Al-Naqeeb (English: The Captain)	Abu Yasser		

=== Films ===
Films
Year	Work	Role	Notes	Ref
2018	Wire			
2020	Towards Baghdad			
2022	The Last Dream			
2023	Forgiveness from the Heart			
2024	Jamal			
2024	The Lawyer			

=== Theatre ===
Year	Work	Role	Notes	Ref
1997	Pilgrimage			
2008	The Fall of the Journey			
2015	Lost			
2016	Comedy of Fear			
2017	Cinema			
2017	Betrayal			
2018	Divisions About Life			
2019	Hero of This Time			
2020	Window of the Loyal Ones			
2024	Where Are You Going			

== Death ==
Iyad Al-Taie died on October 3, 2025, in the city of Baghdad. He was 59 years old at the time of his death and had been suffering from kidney failure and liver cancer. His death was announced by the Iraqi Artists Syndicate, and a number of artists from Iraq and the Arab world expressed their condolences through statements published in the media and on social networks.
