= Salima Khudair =

Iraqi actress (1946–2025)

- Born: 14 December 1946; Kingdom of Iraq
- Died: 26 August 2025 (aged 78); Iraq
- Occupation: Actress
- Years active: 1950s–2011

Salima Khudair (Arabic: سليمة خضير; 14 December 1946 – 26 August 2025) was an Iraqi actress.

== Life and career ==
Khudair was born in Basra in 1946 and began her career with the amateur art troupe at the end of the 1950s in Basra, her love for acting grew with her constant frequenting of cinemas in her city, and working in the theatre, feature films and television. Her most prominent roles are in feature films including The Experience, The Guard, Heroes Fever, and in television series including Scorpio, This is Love, and The Big House.

Khudair died on 26 August 2025, at the age of 78 after a sudden health crisis.
