= The Tattoo Mark =

1972 novel by Abdul Rahman Majeed al-Rubaie

The Tattoo Mark (Novel)
- Author: Abdul Rahman Majeed al-Rubaie
- Language: Arabic
- Genre: Literary fiction, historical fiction, political fiction
- Published: 1972
- Publisher: Dar Al-Ṭaliʿa Publishing
- Pages: 136

Al-Washmu (The Tattoo Mark) is the 1972 novel by the Iraqi writer Abdul Rahman Majeed al-Rubaie. The novel was selected among the 100 best Arabic novels. It reflects the author’s leftist leanings as he focuses on mass arrests and the defeatism following the 1958 Iraqi coup d'état.

== Summary ==
The novel spans 1958-1967, and it centers on the main character (Karim Al-Nasseri). Karim is an Iraqi young man who is a member of several parties. His revolutionary spirit is at its highest, until he gets arrested. After his arrest, Karim has a completely new personality, contradicting his old one, that is consumed by revulsion, defeatism, and lack of principles. A conflict ensues between his old and new personality. His life becomes consumed by alcohol, sex, and women. The novel navigates all the aspects of persecution and defeatism.

== Literary Criticism ==
The novel reflects the persecution and political oppression faced by al-Rubaie himself. He treats the question of mass arrests as a general cause that Arab countries suffer from. Despite his being Iraqi, al-Rubaie's nationalism included the entirety of the Arab world, for the questions and causes that he discusses in his novel (Al-Washmu) or (The Tattoo Mark) are relevant to all Arab countries. Critics claim that al-Rubaie relied on western literature and criticism in his writings, and this was verified by the author himself when he stated that he takes inspiration from some writers like Michel Butor and Alain Robbe-Grillet, and other international writers. Some of the topics derived from western literature that al-Rubaie employed in his novels are realism, Marxism, and existentialism. Al-Rubaie also drew from Arabic literature, like Mahmoud Amin Al-Alim, Hussain Marwa, Gibran Khalil Gibran, Abdelmuhsin Taha Badr, Yousef Idris, and Abdelwahab Al-Bayati. Al-Rubaie did not consider western literature and Arabic literature as mutually exclusive; he viewed them as complementary.
