= Hussein Mohammed Hadi Al-Sadr =

Iraqi Islamic scholar (1945–2026)

Sayyid Hussein Mohammed Hadi Al-Sadr حسين محمد هادي الصدر

Personal life
- Born: 1945 Baghdad, Iraq
- Died: 21 April 2026 (aged 81)
- Resting place: Baghdad, Iraq
- Citizenship: Iraq

Religious life
- Religion: Islam
- Sect: Shia Islam

Muslim leader
- Based in: Baghdad, Iraq

Sayyid Hussein Mohammed Hadi Al-Sadr (1945 – 21 April 2026) was an Iraqi Shia cleric, scholar and writer. He was an opponent of Saddam Hussein's Baath regime. According to his Iraqi News Agency, he was "regarded as one of the prominent personalities who combined religious thought with cultural openness."

Al-Sadr died on 21 April 2026, at the age of 81. Upon his death, President Nizar Amidi commended him as "a distinguished scholar, enlightened thinker, and a man of exceptional integrity whose life and legacy left a profound mark on all who knew him." Public condolences were also offered by Farhad Atroushi, the Deputy Speaker of Parliament.
