= Ashti Hawrami =

Iraqi Kurdistani politician (1948–2024)

- ئاشتی ھەورامی
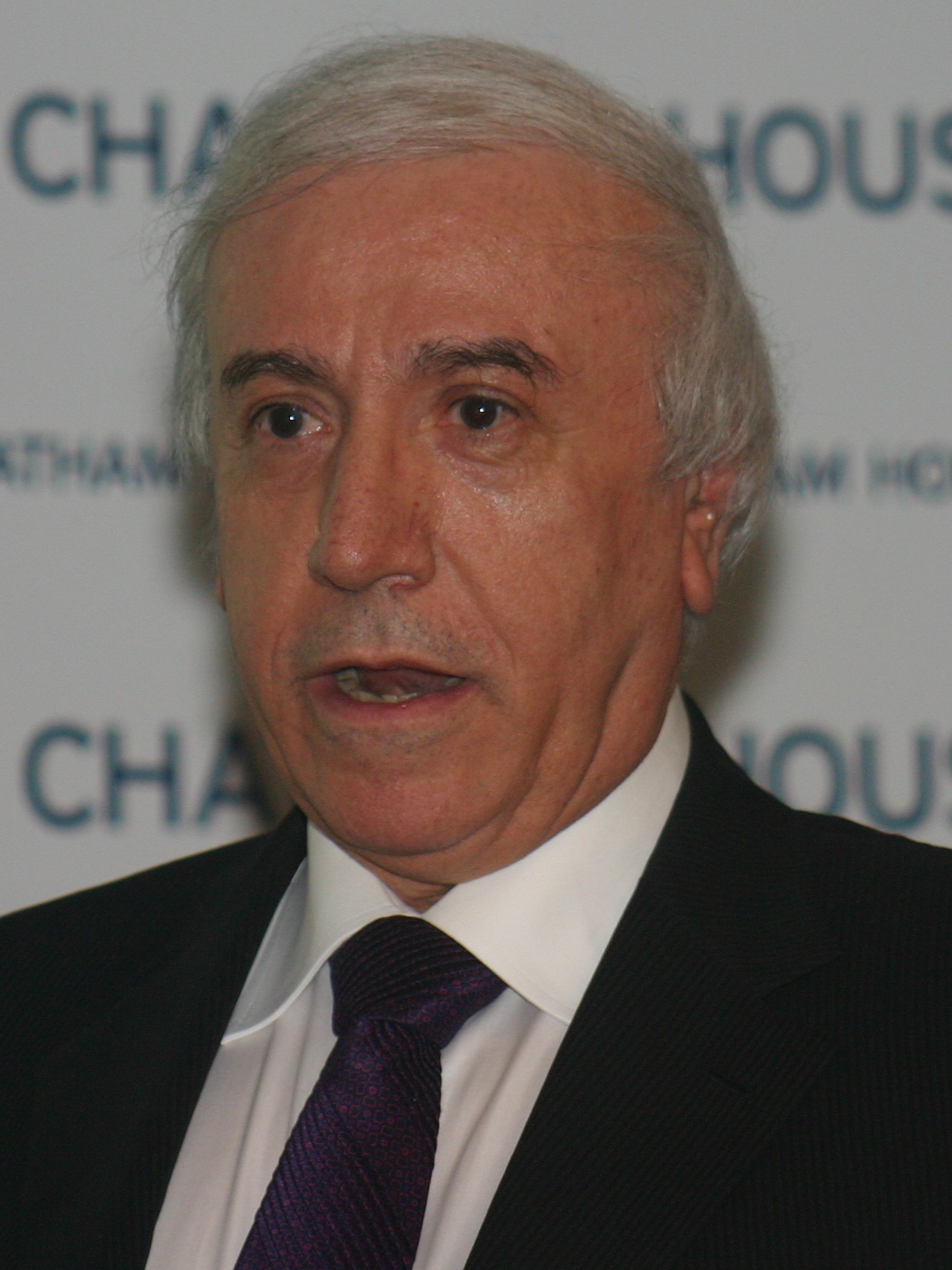
- Hawrami in 2010

Minister of Natural Resources

Deputy Prime Minister for Energy Affairs

Personal details
- Born: Abdullah Abdulrahman Abdullah; 1948
- Died: 20 October 2024 (aged 76) London, United Kingdom
- Occupation: Politician

Abdullah Abdulrahman Abdullah (1948 – 20 October 2024), better known as Ashti Hawrami, was an Iraqi Kurdish politician who served as Minister of Natural Resources of the Kurdistan Region of Iraq.

In the ninth cabinet of the Kurdistan Regional Government, he was deputy prime minister for energy affairs and a member of the Supreme Council of Oil and Gas of the Kurdistan Region.

Hawrami died in London on 20 October 2024, at the age of 76.
