= Khalid Kishtainy =

Iraqi writer and satirist (1929–2023)

Khalid al-Kishtainy (Arabic: خالد القشطيني; 10 October 1929 – 3 June 2023) was an Iraqi writer and satirist living in London.

== Life and career ==
Born in Baghdad, Kishtainy trained as a lawyer and artist, graduating in painting from Baghdad's Institute of Fine Arts in 1952 and gaining a law degree from the University of Baghdad in 1953. After the 1958 Iraq Revolution broke out he stopped teaching painting in Baghdad and moved to London to work for the BBC. From 1989 he wrote a daily satirical column in al-Sharq al-Awsat.

Kishtainy died on 3 June 2023, at the age of 93.

== Works ==
- Verdict in Absentia: A Study of the Palestine Case as represented to the Western World, Palestine Liberation Organization Research Center, 1969
- Whither Israel? A Study of Zionist Expansionism, Palestine Liberation Organization Research Center, 1970
- Palestine in Perspective, Palestine Liberation Organization, 1971
- The New Statesman and the Middle East, Palestine Research Center, 1972
- Social and Foreign Affairs in Iraq, 1979
- The Prostitute in Progressive Literature, Allison & Busby, 1982
- Arab Political Humour, Quartet Books, 1985; 1992
- Tales from Old Baghdad: Grandma and I, Routledge, 1997
- Tomorrow is Another Day: A Tale of Saddam’s Baghdad, Elliott & Thompson Ltd, 2003
- By the Rivers of Babylon, Quartet Books, 2008
- Arabian Tales: Baghdad-on-Thames, Quartet Books, 2011
