= Mordechai Bibi =

Israeli politician (1922–2023)

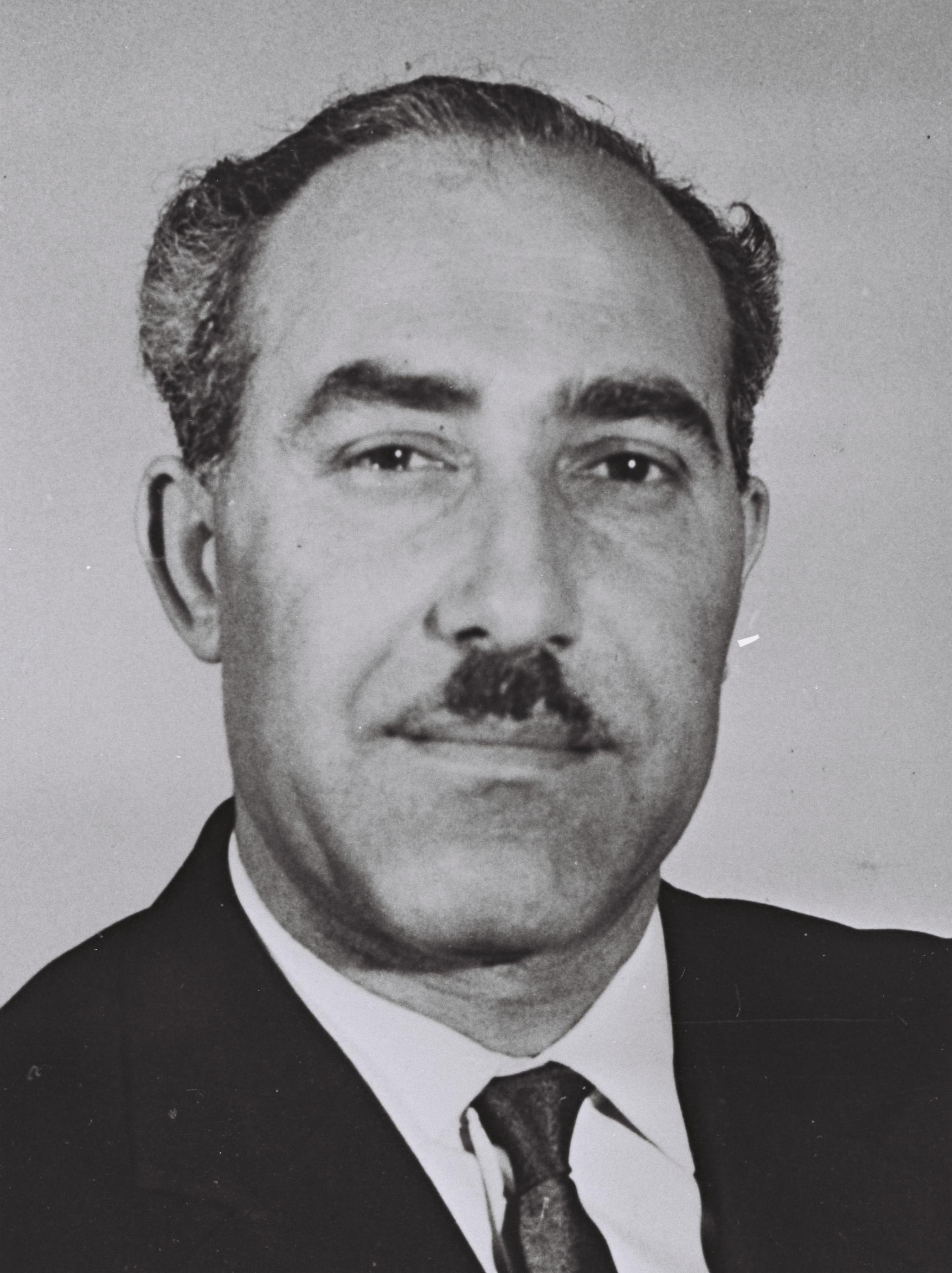
- Bibi in 1969

Faction represented in the Knesset
- 1959–1965: Ahdut HaAvoda
- 1965–1968: Alignment
- 1968–1969: Labor Party
- 1969–1974: Alignment

Personal details
- Born: 1 July 1922 Baghdad, Iraq
- Died: 5 February 2023 (aged 100)

Mordechai Bibi (Hebrew: מרדכי ביבי; 1 July 1922 – 5 February 2023) was an Israeli politician who served as a member of the Knesset for Ahdut HaAvoda and its successors between 1959 and 1974.

== Biography ==
Born in Baghdad in Iraq, Bibi was one of the founders of the Pioneering Zionist Underground movement in Iraq in 1942. Between 1944 and 1945 he directed the Aliyah Committee in Iraq on behalf of Mossad LeAliyah Bet. In 1945 Bibi himself emigrated to Mandatory Palestine and was involved in helping with mass immigration from Iraq between 1949 and 1950. He also studied law at Tel Aviv University and was certified as a lawyer.

From 1953 until 1959 Bibi worked for the Ministry of Defense. A member of Ahdut HaAvoda from 1946, he became a member of the party's central committee and secretariat in 1958. The following year he was elected to the Knesset, and retained his seat in elections in 1961, 1965 and 1969, by which time Ahdut HaAvoda had merged into the Alignment. Between 1969 and 1974 he served as a Deputy Speaker. Bibi didn't seek re-election in 1973 and left the Knesset the following year.

During the 1980s he published two books, From the Four Corners of the Rivers (1983) and The Pioneering Zionist Underground in Iraq (1988). Bibi died on 5 February 2023 aged 100.
