= Abdul Rahman Majeed al-Rubaie =

Iraqi author (1939–2023)

Abdul Rahman Majeed al-Rubaie (Arabic: عبد الرحمن مجيد الربيعي; 12 August 1939 – 20 March 2023) was an Iraqi author. He is one of the best-known writers in modern Iraqi literature. A collection of his stories has been translated into German as Solange die Sonne noch scheint.

== Life and Career ==
Al-Rubaie was born 12 August,1939 in Al-Nasiriyah, in southern Iraq where he finished primary and secondary school. He then got his bachelor degree from the Institute of Fine Arts in Baghdad. He went back to his home city to work as a teacher, then moved to Baghdad to work with newspapers. He became the editor for the cultural pages of several newspaper such "Al-Anbar" And "Al-Fajer Al-Jadeed". Al-Rubaie worked for the Iraqi house of culture in both Beirut and Tunis and was a member of the Iraqi journalists union and the Iraqi Fine artists union.

Al-Rubaie lived in Tunis for around 20 years where he published his biography tilted "Ayyatu Ḥayatin Hiya?" Or "What Kind of Life Is It?" in 2011. He died in Baghdad on 20 March 2023 at the age of 84.

== Notable works ==
- As-Sayfu Wal Safina (The Sword and The Ship)-1966
- Al-Mawasimul Okhra (Other Seasons)-1970
- Al-Washm (The Tattoo Mark)-1972
- Al-Qamaru wal Aswar (The Moon and The Fences)-1974
- Al-Anhar (The Rivers)-1974
- Al-Afwah (The Mouths)-1979
- Al-Waker (The hideout)-1980
- Khuṭuṭul Ṭul... Khuṭuṭul ʿArḍ (Vertical Lines... Horizontal Lines)-1983
- Sirrul Maa’ (Water’s Secret)-1993
- Ayyatu Ḥayatin Hiya? (What Kind of Life Is It?)-2004
- Hunaka Fi Fajjul Riḥ (There in The Wind)-2011
- Najib al-Rafidayn-2011
- Ḥadatha Haḏa Fi Laylatin Tunisiyatin (This Happened on A Tunisian Night)
- Ẓilalun Tunisiya (Tunisian Shades)
- Al-Khuruju Min Baytil Taʿa (Leaving The House of Obedience)
