= 2025 Erbil shooting =

Mass shooting in Iraq

- A CCTV still of the perpetrator standing over one of the victims as he fires a rifle, another victim can be seen lying on the ground nearby.
- Location: Erbil, Kurdistan Region of Iraq
- Date: 6 August 2025 c. 8:30pm
- Weapon: Kalashnikov rifle
- Deaths: 3
- Assailant: 1
- Convictions: Two death sentences and a life sentence

On 6 August 2025, at approximately 8:30pm, a mass shooting took place on Koya road in Erbil, Kurdistan Region of Iraq, following a dispute between some Kurdish petrol station employees and two Arab tourists who were customers, one of the Arab men reportedly pushed and hit an employee, prompting him to retrieve a Kalashnikov rifle from inside the petrol station and shoot both of the men, who died at the scene. A bystander was also killed after being hit by a stray bullet. In October 2026 an Erbil court sentenced the perpetrator to two death sentences and a life sentence. The incident reportedly raised tensions between Kurdish and Arab communities, prompting Masoud Barzani to intervene. On social media, CCTV footage of the incident circulated widely online, with racist reactions among some Kurdish and Arab users. The prime minister of Iraq, Mohammed Shia' al-Sudani also demanded that the investigation file be transferred to Baghdad.

== Incident ==
According to an eyewitness quoted by the Kurdish media network, Rudaw, the incident began when the driver of a black Toyota Land Cruiser refused to pay for petrol spilled while refuelling. An argument subsequently broke out between the driver and a petrol-station employee. Local police said the dispute was over a 52,000 Iraqi dinar fuel charge. Surveillance cameras installed at the location showed one of the customers pushing and hitting one of the workers, and the station employee. Another employee came to separate them, but the two customers pushed them also, which prompted a worker to go and bring a Kalashnikov rifle from inside the station killing both customers and a bystander. The third victim had nothing to do with the dispute. The police rushed to the scene and arrested the perpetrator immediately after the incident. The victims were Iraqi body builder Hamoudi Riyadh and his friend Abdullah Adnan. A third bystander was caught in the crossfire and killed. Hamoudi Riyad, was also known as “the bodybuilding knight of Iraq”. Abdullah was originally from Baghdad. Sources described the two men as Arab tourists visiting the Kurdistan Region. Some sources describe the bystander as a Kurdish citizen from Erbil. His brother happened to be at the scene at the time of the incident.

== Reactions ==
The shooting reignited concerns over the widespread availability of firearms in the Kurdistan Region. The prime minister of Iraq, Mohammed Shia' al-Sudani, and the Minister of Interior, Abdul-Amir al-Shammari, demanded that the investigation file be transferred to Baghdad. Tensions between Kurdish and Arab communities reignited, prompting Masoud Barzani to intervene in an effort to contain the dispute. The Kurdistan Regional Government sent a delegation to Baghdad to try calming it down. A tribal reconciliation was eventually reached between the families of the victims and perpetrator. The perpetrator’s clan paid money to the victims family, completing the reconciliation with an amount of 125 million Iraqi dinars. On social media there was a wave of racist reactions between Kurds and Arabs. Karwan Anwar, secretary of the Kurdistan Journalists Syndicate's Sulaymaniyah branch also stated; “Although the video should not have been so widely circulated, we now call on media channels and social networks to make every effort to delete it,”. On 11 August 2025, Erbil Governor, Omed Khoshnaw met with the victims’ families at a press conference in Erbil and pledged that the perpetrator would be held accountable under the law. He cautioned against portraying the shooting as ethnically motivated, saying that some media outlets had presented it in that manner. One of the victim’s father praised the Kurdistan Regional Government’s response, stating that they demonstrated unity and equality before the law.

== Investigation and trial ==
The suspect reportedly told investigators; “I have been in a lot of fights until this age since I was a kid, but most of the time I was beaten up and dominated. But this time around when this person shoved me, and attacked me in that way, I told myself that this time must not be like previous times. I will get my revenge of the previous fights too from him,” “I felt like I was being oppressed and its my right to defend myself,”. In October 2026, an Erbil court reportedly sentenced the perpetrator to two death sentences and life imprisonment. Media outlets quoted the victims lawyers confirming it, which attracted widespread attention, no further details were provided regarding the grounds for the ruling or the identity of the perpetrator.
