= Lutfiya al-Dulaimi =

Iraqi writer and activist (1939–2026)

- لطفية الدليمي
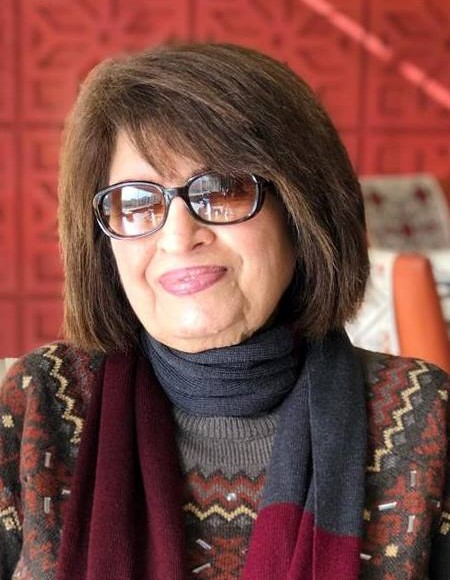
- Born: 7 March 1939; Baqubah, Iraq
- Died: 8 March 2026 (aged 87); Amman, Jordan
- Education: Goldsmiths, University of London
- Years active: 1970–2026

Lutfiya al-Dulaimi (Arabic: لطفية الدليمي; 7 March 1939 – 8 March 2026) was an Iraqi writer, journalist and women's rights activist. A prolific author, she published over 70 works, including novels, short story collections, analytical studies and translations. Her writing frequently addressed the struggles of Iraqi women against the backdrop of the country's political upheavals, including the Iran–Iraq War, the Gulf War, the sanctions regime, and the aftermath of the 2003 invasion.

== Background ==
Lutfiya al-Dulaimi was born on 7 March 1939, and grew up in Baghdad. She enrolled in a literature program at a university in Iraq but dropped out in her final year for personal reasons. From 1971 to 1977, she worked as a teacher. She later resumed her studies, completing a degree at Goldsmiths, University of London in 1978.

Al-Dulaimi worked as an editor for several magazines and published articles and short stories in various Iraqi periodicals. Following the 2003 invasion of Iraq, she received numerous death threats, which compelled her to leave the country. After a brief period in France, she settled in Jordan in 2008, where she resided for the rest of her life. Her experience of exile directly inspired her 2010 novel, Ladies of Saturn.

== Career and literary themes ==
Al-Dulaimi's literary career spanned several decades, establishing her as a significant voice in contemporary Arabic and Iraqi literature. Her work is known for its feminist perspective and its deep engagement with modern Iraqi history. Through her characters—often women grappling with societal restrictions, war, and displacement—she explores themes of trauma, memory, and resilience.

Her novel The Uranium Laugh (2001) is a notable example, dealing with the impact of depleted uranium and the sanctions on Iraqi society. Ladies of Saturn (2010) depicts the fractured lives of Iraqis who were forced into exile after 2003. In addition to her fiction, al-Dulaimi was an active cultural critic and translator, having introduced Arabic readers to works of international literature and criticism.

== Death ==
Al-Dulaimi died in Amman, Jordan on 8 March 2026, at the age of 87.

== Works ==
- A Passage to Men's Sorrows (1970); short stories collection
- Who Will Inherit Paradise (1986); novel
- Seeds of Fire (1988); novel
- Sufi Music (1994); short stories collection
- Lighter Than Angels (1997); novel
- The Uranium Laugh (2001); novel
- Ladies of Saturn (2010); novel
- Novels That I Love (2018); translation
- The Global Novel: Writing the World in the 21st Century (2019); translation
- Disobeying the Commandments: Writer Wandering Around Writing Regions (2019); biography
- The Ouma Project (2021); novel
