= Behnam Afas =

Iraqi author (1934–2023)

Behnam Afas (Arabic:بهنام عفاص; July 17, 1934 – February 12, 2023) or Behnam Fadheel Hanna Afas, was an Iraqi-New Zealander author and researcher. His studies were mostly focused on the role of the Christian scholars and missionaries, their effect on the renaissance of Iraq during the 19th century and the early 20th century. His work is well respected by a large swath of Iraqi ethnic and religious groups.

== Biography ==
Afas was born in the city of Mosul in northern Iraq in 1934. He was the second of six children of a religious Syriac-Catholic family. His father Fadheel Afas was a merchant from Mosul. The family name came from the Gall Nuts trade they worked in.

Afas finished his secondary school in Mosul where he developed a passion for literature and Arabic language. He completed his secondary school and was one of top three graduates in the national exam. His father sent him to Baghdad to complete his education where he chose the Higher Education House of Teachers. He received his Bachelor of Arts in literature with honor in 1955. He completed his higher studies in the University of Sorbonne – France and was awarded the D.E.A. on his studies about the role of Iraqi Christians in the renaissance of Iraq during the 19th Century. Afas taught Arabic language, literature and educating methods in several institutions and schools in Iraq such as; Teachers Training Institute, Baghdad College, Babel College of Theology, Al-Nidhameia high school and Al-Mustansiriya University.In spite of Afas's fondness for New Zealand, he chose to reside in the suburbs of Melbourne, Australia, close to his eldest son Joshua, youngest daughter Rawa, and middle son Jesse living in North America.

On 18 June 2015, he was awarded Al Onka al Thahabia al Dawalia (The International Golden Phenix award) in a ceremony in Melbourne, Australia.

Afas died in Melbourne on 12 February 2023, at the age of 88.

== His work ==
Most of Afas's books, research papers, lectures and articles argue that the Christian missionaries and scholars in Iraq have given modern Iraq a valuable gift in education, introduction of press and publications leading to considerable effect on the renaissance of Iraq. It is also equivalent to any of its neighboring Arab states in the amount of scholars, researchers and thinkers in the 19th century.

== Studies and Published Books ==
1. بغداد ١٩٨٥ اقليميس يوسف داؤد – رائد من رواد الفكر في العراق ١٨٢٩- ١٨٩٠, دراسة تحليلية published in Arabic (Mgr Clement Yousif Dawood, One of the Pioneers in Intellects). link
2. تاريخ الطباعة والمطبوعات العراقية – Baghdad 1985, published in Arabic, 2-volumes (History of Iraqi Printing and Publications).
3. Almaraa w majalat alamal al alafdal laha, published in Arabic (Best Working Fields for Women).
4. Christian Heritage in Iraq across the Ages, published in English & Arabic.
5. Pioneers of the renaissance in Iraq in the 19th century, study in French & Arabic.
6. The Iraqi Christian Heritage in the Renaissance Era, 2010, Melbourne. link
7. Memories from the old days (Thikraat min al zaman al baeed), 2011, Melbourne.
8. From the depths of memory (Min aamaak al thakira), 2012, Melbourne.
9. Of Heritage (Min al turath), 2017, Melbourne.

== Well known students ==
Some of his now famous students are Inaam Kachachi; journalist and author, Zaha Hadid; world-famous architect, and famous author Aziz Al-sayed Jassim.

== Bibliography ==
1. Library of Congress; CT1919.178 D383 1985.
2. Library of Congress; MLCMN 95/1854 (Z) FT MEADE.
3. Maosooaa Aalam Al Iraq fi Alqorn Alishreen, Ministry of Knowledge – Dr. hameed Almatbaai – 1995, P-32 (Encyclopedia of Famous Names in Iraq in the 20th Century).
4. Maosooaa Aalam Al Almousel fi Alqorn Alishreen University of Mousel – Dr Aumar Al Talib – 2007, Page-100 (Encyclopedia of Famous Names in Mousel in the 20th Century).
5. Early Arabic Printing: A catalogue of attitudes by Michael W. Albin.
6. Al Anqaa Iraqi International organization
