= Ibrahim Haydari =

Iraqi sociologist (1936–2024)

- إبراهيم الحيدري
- Born: 3 August 1936; Kadhimiya, Baghdad, Iraq
- Died: May 2024 (aged 87)
- Education: Phd in Social Ethnology
- Alma mater: University of Baghdad; University of Frankfurt; Free University of Berlin

Ibrahim Haydari (Arabic: إبراهيم الحيدري; 3 August 1936 – May 2024) was an Iraqi sociologist. He had teaching experience as he taught sociology in the Institute of Social Ethnology at Free University of Berlin from 1972 to 1976, the Department of Sociology at College of Arts – University of Baghdad 1977–1980. He was also a visiting professor at the Institute of Social Ethnology at Free University of Berlin from 1981 to 1982. He wrote numerous publications. Haydari died in May 2024, at the age of 87.

== Education and career ==
Ibrahim Haydari was born in Kadhimiya, Baghdad, on 3 August 1936. He completed his primary and secondary education in Kadhimiya and attended high school in Baghdad. He received a bachelor's degree in literature from the Department of Sociology, College of Arts, University of Baghdad, in 1962. He later obtained a master's degree in sociology from the University of Frankfurt, Germany, in 1969. In 1974, he earned a PhD in Social Ethnology from the Free University of Berlin.

Haydari participated in numerous Arab and international scientific conferences held in Berlin, Frankfurt, Baghdad, Basra, London, Beirut, Algeria, Annaba, Madrid, and other cities. He authored several books and translated many research papers in Arabic, German, and English.

== Teaching career ==
- 1972–1976: Institute of Social Ethnology at Free University of Berlin.
- 1977–1980: Department of Sociology, University of Baghdad
- 1981–1982: Visiting professor – Institute of Social Ethnology at Free University of Berlin
- 1983–1992: Professor at Institute of Sociology, University of Annaba, Algeria.

== Publications ==
Some of his works include the following:

1. Ubersetzung aus dem Arabischen mit Weirauch : Ali Al - Wardi, Soziologie des Nomadentums, Studie uber die Irakische Gesellschaft, Sozioligische Texte Nr. 73. Luchterhand, Verlag, Neuwied und Darmstadt 1972 (454S.) mit nachwort zu Ali AL- wardi (S. 453–447).
2. Zur Soziologie des shiitischen Chiliasmus. Ein Beitrag zur Erforschung des Irakischen Passionsspiels, Islamkundliche Utersuchungen, Bd. 31. Klaus Schwarz Verlag, Freiburg im Breisgau 1975, 274S.
3. Die Ta ziya, das schiitische Passionsspeil im Lebanon. مجلة الجمعية الشرقية الأمريكية Suppl. III Franz Steiner Verlag, Wiesbaden 1977, S.430-437.
4. Das Aulflosungsprozess des Beduinentums in Irak, in: Abhandlung des geographischen Insititut Anthropo-geographischie. Bd.33, Berlin1982 (S.139 – 1942)
5. Beduinen im Zeichen des Erdols. Von F. Scholz, (Besprechung) in: Sozio-psyschologie, Nr Iv, Berlin 1984.
6. The Retuals of Ashura, in: Ayatolahs, Sufis and Ideologies. Ed. By F. A. Jabar, P. 101-114 Saqi Book, London 2
7. Fear of Reform, Muntada, Libya Human & political Development Forum, London, 2 May 2005
8. Islam and Modernity, Islam21, Forum for Islamic Dialogue, London 12 January 2007
9. Theology and Sociology-Compatibility, Islam 21, Forum for Islamic Dialogue, London 11 May
