= 2024 Anbar raid =

Battle resulting in the death of ISIS militants in Iraq

- Location: Al Anbar Governorate, Iraq
- Date: 31 August – 1 September 2024
- Deaths: 16
- Injuries: 7

In the morning of 31 August 2024, a raid was carried out by the American and Iraqi military in Al Anbar Governorate, Iraq, targeting the Islamic State.

The raid targeted a "senior leader" of the Islamic State, later identified as Abu Ali Al-Tunisim, who was killed. Also killed was Ahmad Hamed, an Islamic State deputy commander. The operation included over 100 American troops, assisted by Iraqi troops, and included a helicopter assault with drone assistance.

On 1 September 2024, over 100 Iraqi forces seized two Islamic State fighters who had fled the previous day's fighting with paperwork relating to Islamic State finances and military information.

At least fifteen Islamic State militants were killed and seven U.S. soldiers were injured.
