= Timelines of Iraq history =

Timelines of Iraq history include:

- Timeline of Baghdad
- Timeline of Basra
- Timeline of Mosul
