= 2010 in Iraq =

- Decades: 1990s; 2000s; 2010s; 2020s
- See also: Other events of 2010; List of years in Iraq

Events in the year 2010 in Iraq.

== Incumbents ==
- President: Jalal Talabani
- Prime Minister: Nouri al-Maliki
- Vice President: Tariq al-Hashimi, Adil Abdul-Mahdi
- Iraqi Kurdistan Regional Government (autonomous region)
  - President: Massoud Barzani
  - Prime Minister: Barham Salih

== Events ==
=== January ===
- January 25 - 3 suicide car bombs explode in Baghdad, killing at least 37 people
- January 27 - the Islamic State of Iraq claims the suicide car bombing attack

=== February ===
- February 1 - A female suicide bomber killed 54, and injured 100 Shia Pilgrims on their way to Karbala

=== March ===
- March 7 – A parliamentary election was held in Iraq on 7 March 2010. The secular, non-sectarian Iraqi National Movement received the most votes.
- March 8 – Oil extraction rights to the Maysan Oilfields were granted to China March 8, 2010.

=== April ===
- April 4 – A series of car bombs explode in Baghdad. The attack, which targeted mainly foreign embassies in Iraq, resulted in the death of at least 41 people and over 200 injured.
- April 18 – Iraqi SOF conducted an operation southwest of Tikrit that killed Abu Ayyub al-Masri and Abu Omar al-Baghdadi, the two leaders of the ISI, a U.S. UH-60 Blackhawk supporting the operation crashed killing a Ranger Sergeant and injuring the aircrew.
- April 20 – Al-Qaeda's Northern commander (Kirkuk, Salahuddin and Nineveh Governorates) was killed in a joint raid in Mosul.

=== May ===
- May 10 - A series of attacks in Baghdad, Mosul, Fallujah, along with other cities, kills 85 people and injures 140

=== June ===
- June 20 - 2 suicide car bombs detonate near the Trade Bank of Iraq, killing 26 and wounding 50 people

=== August ===
- August 2 – The New York Times reported that the United States would "withdraw designated combat forces from Iraq by the end of August."
- August 3 – At least 5 police officers are shot dead at a checkpoint in Baghdad, Iraq.
- August 7 – 5 Iraqi policemen are killed in an overnight shootout in western Baghdad, while 1 policeman is killed at a checkpoint outside Fallujah.
- August 18 – The 4th Stryker Brigade, 2nd Infantry Division crosses the international border between Iraq and Kuwait, effectively ending U.S combat operations within the country of Iraq. 52,600 U.S. military personnel remain in Iraq to take on an advisory role as Operation New Dawn begins.
- August 31 – U.S. President Barack Obama announced that all U.S.combat operations will end. 50,000 troops will stay in an advise and assist role. The full withdrawal is scheduled for December 2011.

=== September ===
- September 13 – A civilian is killed and six people injured in fighting in Iraq's Diyala Governorate.
- September 15 – US and Iraqi forces raid a neighbourhood in Fallujah resulting in at least six casualties.
- September 17 – An Iraqi Army soldier is killed and eleven people are wounded following two bombs going off in Baghdad.
- September 19 – 2 car bombs explode in Baghdad, Iraq, killing at least 31 people and injuring 111.
- September 26 – The Islamic Revolutionary Guard Corps cross the border into Iraq and kill 30 Kurds.

=== October ===
- 31 October – A number of terrorists storm the Sayidat al-Nejat Cathedral and hold worshippers as hostages. The Siege lasted few hours until security forces broke into the church, the confrontation led to at least 58 dead and around 100 injured.

=== November ===
- 1 November – Iraq Security forces storm the offices of the Al-Baghdadia TV station and take few of its employees into custody based on terrorism related charges. During the siege of the Sayidat al-Nejat Cathedral the day before, the attackers used the Al-Baghdadia's hotline to broadcast their demands, thus placing the station under suspicion.

=== December ===
- 15 December – The United Nations Security Council Resolution 1957 is adopted, lifting all sanctions on Iraq after 19 years of imposing them.

== Notable deaths ==
- January 25 – Ali Hassan al-Majid, 68, Iraqi military commander and government minister, execution by hanging.
- March 15 - Kazim al-Samawi, 85, in Stockholm, Iraqi poet.
- April 18 – Abu Omar al-Baghdadi, Iraqi terrorist (Al-Qaeda), airstrike.
- 4 July – Mohammad Hussein Fadlallah, Iraqi-Lebanese Shia cleric.
- September 7 – Riad al-Saray, 35, Iraqi television presenter, shot.
- September 8 – Safah Abdul Hameed, Iraqi journalist, shot.
- September 9 – Ibrahim Ahmad Abd al-Sattar, Iraqi armed forces chief of staff.
- October 7 – Selma Al-Radi, Iraqi archaeologist.

== See also ==
- Iraq War
- Withdrawal of U.S. troops from Iraq
