= 2009 in Iraq =

- Decades: 1980s; 1990s; 2000s; 2010s; 2020s
- See also: Other events of 2009; List of years in Iraq

Events in the year 2009 in Iraq.

== Incumbents ==
- President: Jalal Talabani
- Prime Minister: Nouri al-Maliki
- Vice President: Tariq al-Hashimi, Adil Abdul-Mahdi
- Iraqi Kurdistan Regional Government (autonomous region)
  - President: Massoud Barzani
  - Prime Minister: Barham Salih
- Iraqi Kurdistan Regional Government (autonomous region)
  - President: Massoud Barzani
  - Prime Minister: Nechervan Barzani to 31 August Barham Salih

== Events ==
=== January ===
- 1 January – The United States officially hands over responsibility for security in the Green Zone to Iraqi forces
- The U.S. opens its embassy in Baghdad.
- 22 January – The Estonian and Salvadoran missions to Iraq end.
- 26 January – Four U.S. soldiers died when two helicopters crashed, after they came under enemy fire, in northern Iraq.
- 31 January – Iraq holds its provincial elections with a minimum of violence.

=== February ===
- 1 February – A total of 191 Iraqis were killed in violence during January, the lowest monthly toll since the US-led invasion of March 2003.
- Sixteen U.S. troops died in Iraq in January 2009.
- 9 February – Three U.S. soldiers were killed by a suicide car bomber in Mosul. A fourth U.S. soldier died later of wounds suffered in the attack.
- 10 February – Nicolas Sarkozy became the first French president to visit Iraq in a surprise stopover during a Persian Gulf tour.
- 11 February – Twin car bombings at a Baghdad bus station kill 16 people.
- 12 February – The United Kingdom suffered its first Iraq War fatality of 2009 when a British soldier was shot and killed in Basra.
- 13 February – A female suicide bomber kills 40 Shiite pilgrims south of Baghdad.
- 15 February – a U.S. soldier from 610 ESC, 14th Engineer Battalion, 555 Engineer Brigade was killed by an EFP (Explosively Formed Projectile) in As Salam in Southern Iraq
- 23 February –
  - A U.S. soldier and an interpreter were shot dead by Iraqi policemen who opened fire on them as they toured Iraqi police positions on a bridge in Mosul during fighting north of Baghdad. Three others were wounded.
  - Three U.S. soldiers and an interpreter were killed and a fourth U.S. soldier wounded in a firefight with insurgents in the Diyala Province.
- 27 February –
  - Christopher R. Hill was named to succeed Ryan Crocker as U.S. Ambassador to Iraq.
  - Barack Obama, President of the United States, announced 31 August 2010 as the deadline for the withdrawal of "combat troops" from Iraq. A "transitional force" of 35,000 to 50,000 support, advisory, and counterterrorism personnel is slated for withdrawal by the end of 2011. Obama declared that this strategy for withdrawal was in line with the American goal of "a full transition to Iraqi responsibility" for the sovereign nation of Iraq. He congratulated the Iraqi people and government for their "proud resilience" in not "giving into the forces of disunion", but cautioned that Iraqis would have to remain vigilant against "those ... who will insist that Iraq's differences cannot be reconciled without more killing" even after the U.S. drawdown in 2010 and withdrawal in 2011.
  - The Iraqi death toll for February leapt substantially from January's count to 258, a 35% increase.
  - Seventeen U.S. troops died in February 2009 in Iraq. One U.K. serviceman was also killed.

=== March ===
- Nine US soldiers die in Iraq this month, the lowest since the start of the war.
- 12 March – The trial of Muntadhir al-Zaidi, on charges of assault for throwing his shoes at George W. Bush, resumes at the Central Criminal Court of Iraq following an adjournment in late December 2008 so the court could determine whether Bush was in Iraq on an official visit, since he had entered the country uninvited by Iraqi officials and had been greeted by the U.S. military. Al-Zaidi was sentenced to three years in prison, although on 7 April 2009 the sentence was reduced to one year from three years. The maximum sentence facing al-Zaidi was 15 years.

=== April ===
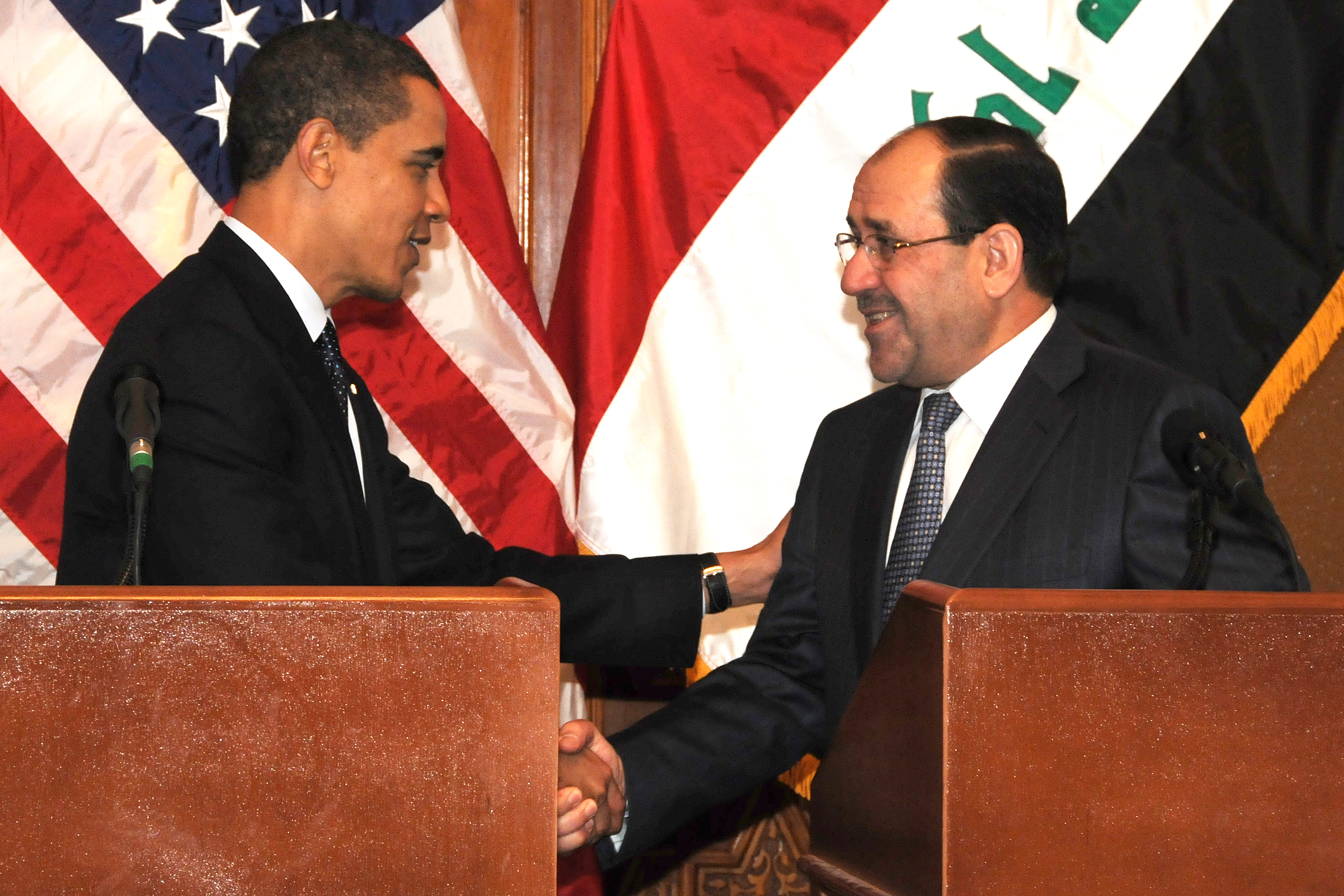
Iraqi Prime Minister Nouri al-Maliki shakes hands with U.S. President Barack Obama in Baghdad, 7 April 2009

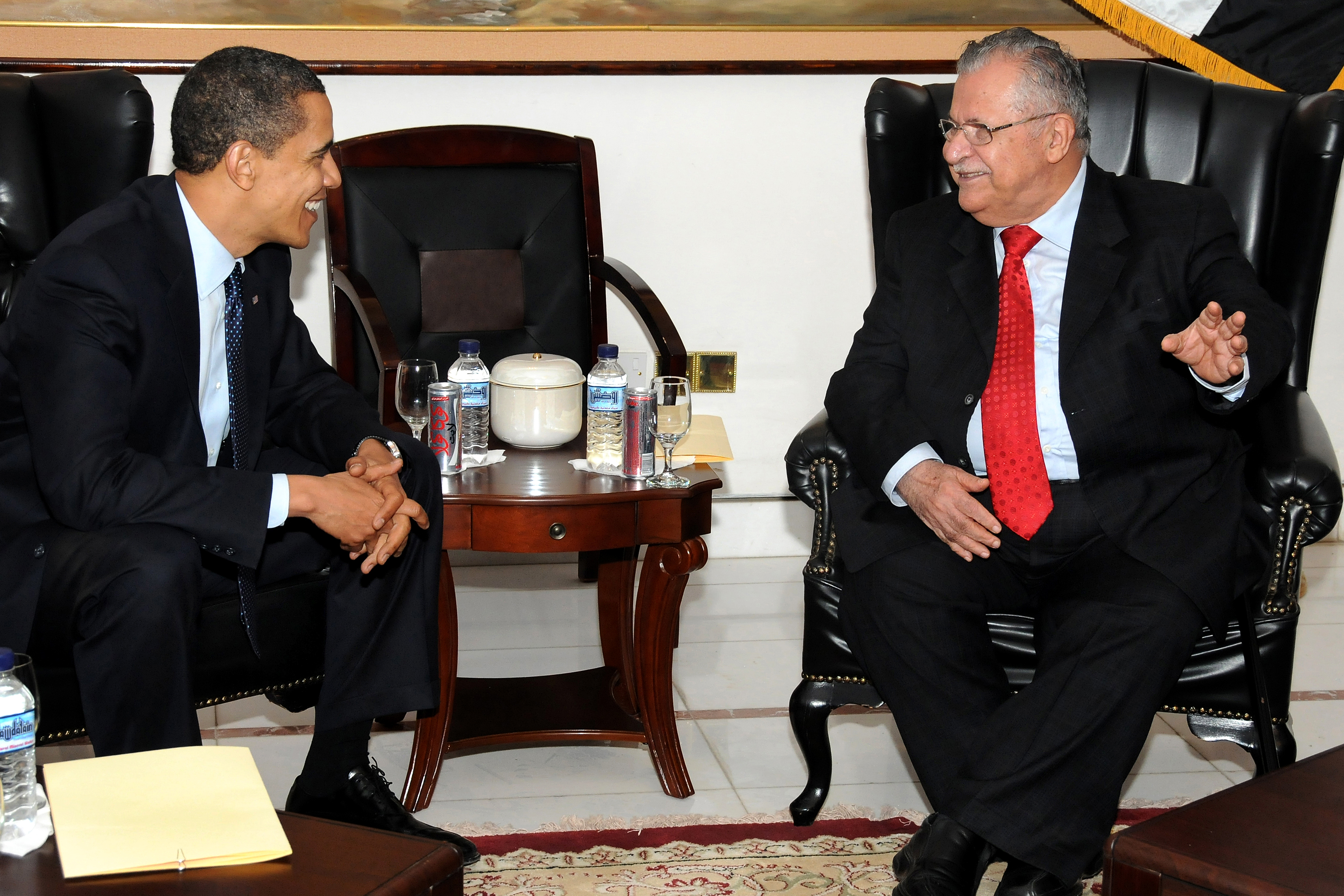
President of Iraq Jalal Talabani with U.S. President Barack Obama, 7 April 2009

- 7 April – U.S. President Barack Obama makes a surprise visit to troops in Iraq.
- 10 April – Suicide bomber in truck kills five US troops in Iraq
- 23 April – Two suicide bombings kill over eighty people in Baghdad and near Baqubah, the worst violence in 2009

=== May ===
- 11 May – Sgt. John Russell opens fire at a clinic at Camp Liberty in Baghdad, killing five fellow soldiers, before being subdued.
- 15 May – The Royal Air Force commemorates the end of their nineteen years of operations in Iraq.
- 27 May – The last of the U.K.'s combat troops are withdrawn.

=== June ===
- 4 June – Romanian forces officially end their Iraq mission
- 22 June – Sherif Kamal Shahine is appointed Egypt's ambassador to Iraq, replacing Ihab al-Sharif, who was killed in July 2005 by Al Qaeda in Iraq. He was the second Egyptian ambassador to Iraq since the Fall of Saddam Hussein's regime in April 2003.
- 24 June – A bomb explodes in a market in Sadr City, Baghdad killing at least 69 and injuring at least 150.
- 30 June –
  - US troops formally handed over security duties to Iraqi forces and withdrew from towns and cities in Iraq. US troops continue to be embedded with Iraqi forces.
  - A car bombing kills at least 27 people in Kirkuk.

=== July ===
- 28 July – Australia, the United Kingdom and Romania end their Iraq troop presence, leaving the United States with the only foreign combat troops in the country.

=== August ===
- 19 August - Waves of explosions kill over 100 in Baghdad and injure 298 people.

=== September ===
- 11 September – Inmates at Iraq's Abu Garrib prison start a fire and clash with guards during two days of unrest
- 16 September – U.S. Vice President Joe Biden made his second visit to Baghdad in as many months and met with Prime Minister al-Maliki even as insurgents fired mortars and rockets at the Green Zone to protest his presence. Although said to be in "listening mode", Biden addressed issues of security, political reconciliation, and foreign investment in Iraq's oil-rich but weakened economy with various leaders in the capital and Iraq's Kurdish region. Biden said, "We will also move ahead on other aspects of our security agreement by removing all US combat brigades from Iraq by the end of August 2010 and all remaining US troops by the end of 2011."
- 18 September – At least 7 people have been killed and another 21 injured when a car bomb detonated at a busy market place in the Iraqi town of Mahmudiya, 30 km (19 mi) south of the capital Baghdad.

=== October ===
- 11 October – A series of apparently coordinated bombings aimed at a meeting for national reconciliation killed 23 people and wounded 65 others in western Iraq, but they did not injure the officials who were at the gathering. The first bomb exploded about 11 am outside the headquarters of Ramadi's main government building, where the provincial governor and council have offices. About seven minutes after the first bomb, a second car in the parking lot exploded, wounding security force members and others who had responded to the original explosion; this bomb caused most of the casualties. About one hour after the first two bombings, a man driving a car filled with explosives attempted to speed through a security checkpoint near the Ramadi General Hospital; he was shot by a police officer at the checkpoint but managed to explode the car, killing himself and wounding two others.
- 25 October – At least 155 people have been killed and around 721 injured, after two large car bomb explosions detonated in central Baghdad. The explosions are believed to have been detonated in the green zone of central Baghdad, close to several ministry buildings. These are the largest attacks since 19 August when truck bombs exploded near two ministry buildings killing at least 100 people. Iraq has blamed foreign fighters for this attack and has accused Syria of involvement in these bombings. Iraq is demanding a UN investigation over the incident.

=== December ===
- 8 December – At least 127 people are killed and more than 200 injured in a series of car bombings, the deadliest attacks in Iraq since 25 October bombings. The attacks were coordinated and aimed at important government buildings.
- 18 December – Iranian forces invade and seize East Maysan oilfield 4.
- 31 December – The US suffers only three troop deaths, and no combat deaths, the lowest monthly figure since the war began.

== Notable deaths ==
- 27 April – Hirmis Aboona, 69, historian.
- 27 May – Ammo Baba, 74, Iraqi footballer and athletic trainer, diabetes.
- 7 August – Taha Muhie-eldin Marouf, 80, Iraqi politician, Vice President (1975–2003).
- 26 August – Abdul Aziz al-Hakim, 56, Iraqi politician, lung cancer.
- 3 September – Alec MacLachlan, 30, British hostage in Iraq (death confirmed on this date).

== See also ==
- Media related to 2009 in Iraq at Wikimedia Commons
