= 2008 in Iraq =

- Decades: 1980s; 1990s; 2000s; 2010s; 2020s
- See also: Other events of 2008; List of years in Iraq

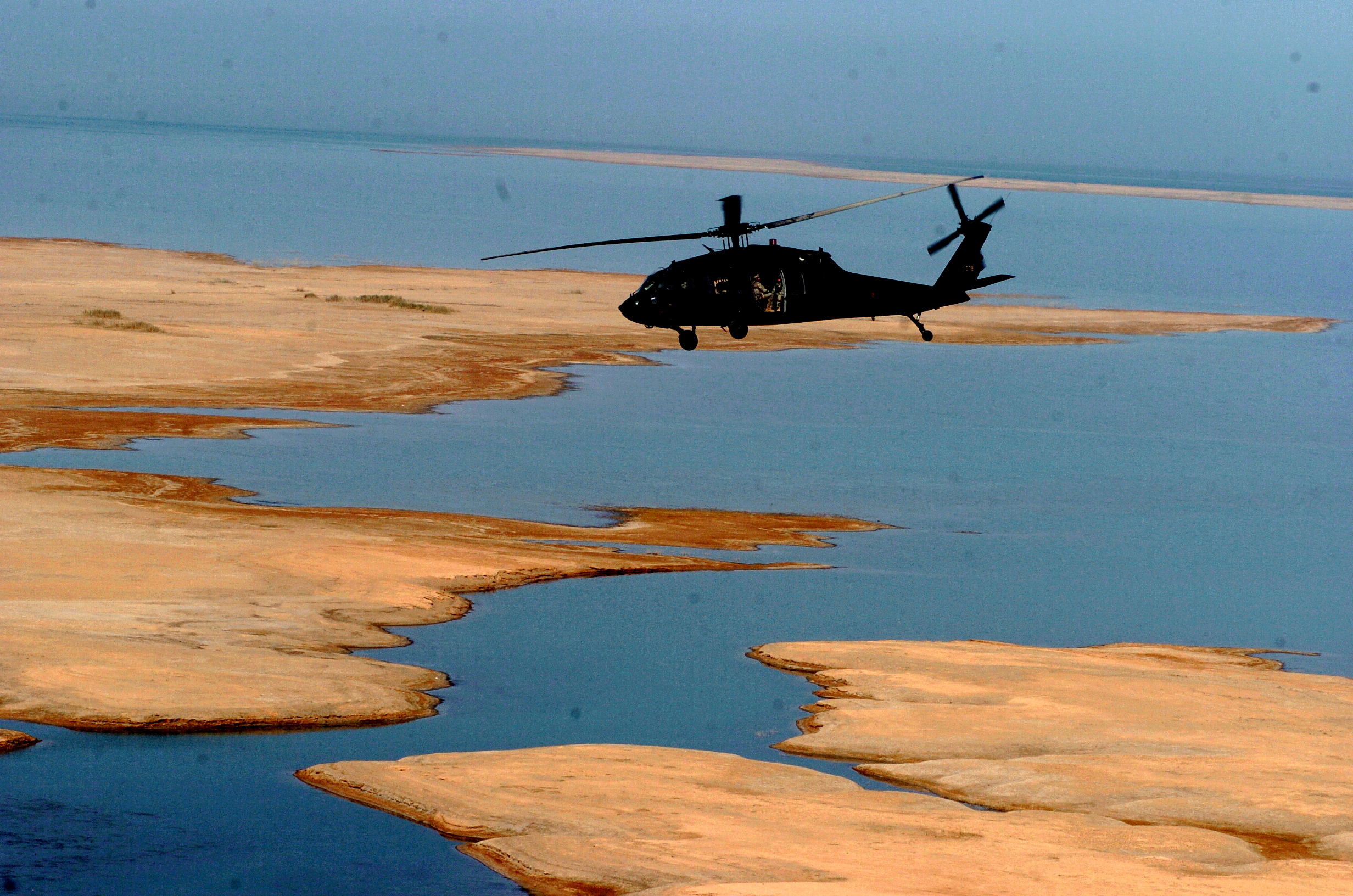
US Army helicopter over Buhayrat al-Habbaniyah, 2008

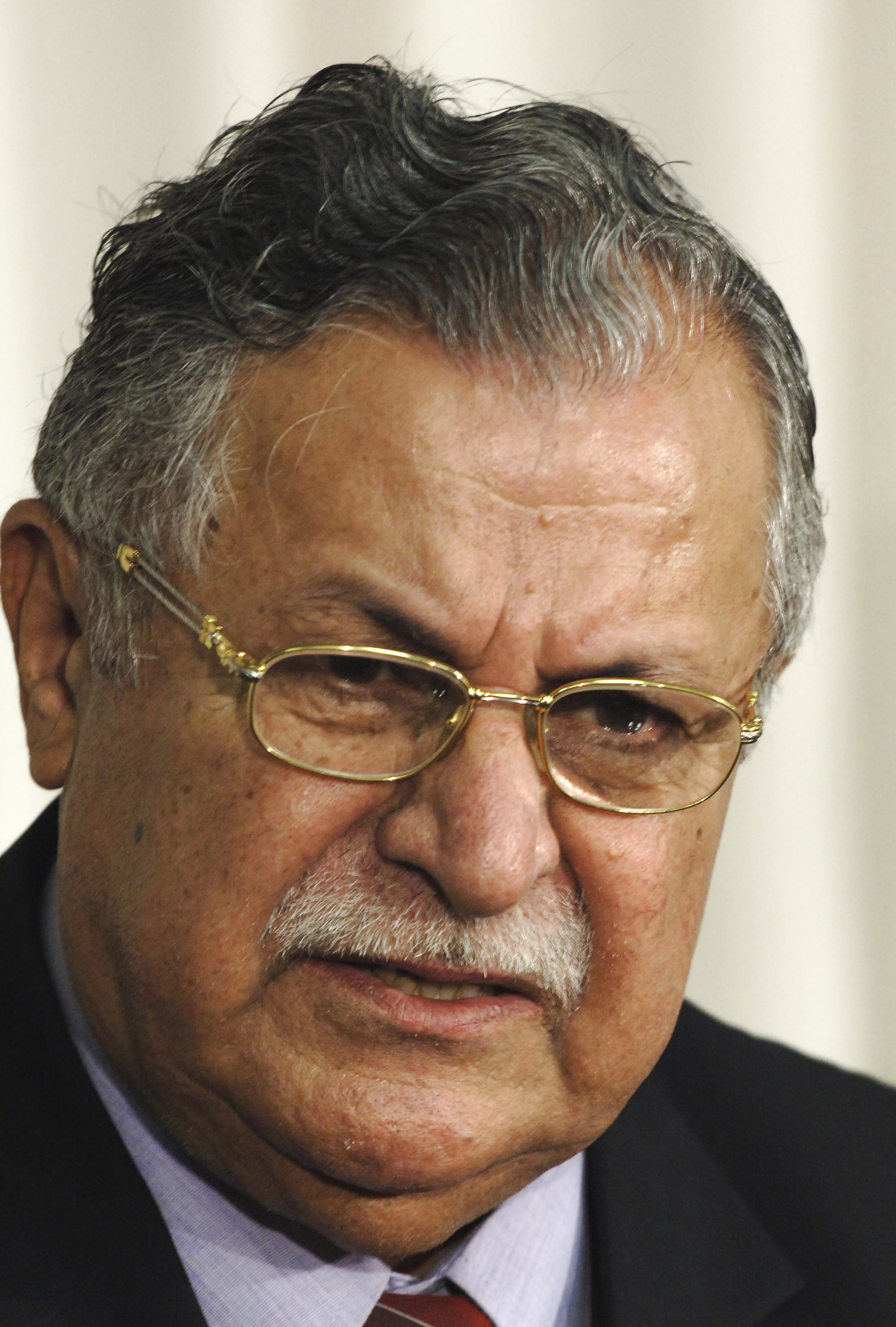
President Jalal Talabani in 2005

Events in the year 2008 in Iraq.

== Incumbents ==
- President: Jalal Talabani
- Prime Minister: Nouri al-Maliki
- Vice President: Tariq al-Hashimi, Adil Abdul-Mahdi
- Iraqi Kurdistan Regional Government (autonomous region)
  - President: Massoud Barzani
  - Prime Minister: Barham Salih
- Iraqi Kurdistan Regional Government
  - President: Massoud Barzani
  - Prime Minister: Nechervan Barzani

== Events ==
=== January ===
The new flag of Iraq

- 1 January – A suicide bomber kills more than 30 people and injures 32 in an attack in Baghdad. The blast is targeted at mourners at the funeral of a Shia army officer, Nabil Hussein Jassim, who had himself been killed by a car bombing in central Baghdad three days earlier.
- 7 January – A double bombing in Baghdad kills at least 14 people, including Riyadh Samarrai, leader of the US-backed Adhamiya Awakening group, which fights al-Qaeda in Sunni areas of the city.
- 8 January – Operation Phantom Phoenix begins in an attempt to hunt down the remaining 200 al-Qaeda extremists in the province of Diyala following the end of the previous offensive. The operation also includes targeting insurgent elements in Salah ad-Din province. Nine Americans and up to 30 insurgents are killed in the first two days of fighting.
- 9 January – One of the largest surveys to date of Iraqi casualties of violence since the US-led invasion in 2003 is released and reports that around 151,000 Iraqis have died. The study by the Iraq Family Health Survey Study Group involved a survey of Iraqi homes and estimated the number of violent deaths at 151,000 (with a 95% uncertainty range of 104,000 to 223,000) for the period March 2003 through June 2006.
- 10 January – Continuing offensives as part of Operation Phantom Phoenix saw over 18,000 kg (40,000 lb) of explosives dropped by two USAF B-1 Lancers and four F-16 fighter aircraft on al-Qaeda positions in the Arab Jabour area of Baghdad.
- 11 January – Snow fell in Baghdad for the first time in over 50 years. Thawing on contact with the ground, the snow failed to settle, although residents gathered in the streets to watch the flurries. Anecdotal evidence suggests snow may have fallen in northern parts of the city 40 years ago however the 2008 snowfall is thought to be the first in living memory.
- 13 January – The Federal government of Iraq announces the passing of a law which will allow former members of the Baath Party to take up military and civil service positions. Following the cessation of formal hostilities in 2003 the US-led administration under Paul Bremer had prohibited former Baath members from holding positions. The new law, aimed at reconciliation, offers an amnesty in respect of Baath party members whose re-appointment is not resisted following a three-month review period. Pensions may also be offered to former officials regardless of whether they take up new positions.
- 14 January – A senior Iraq Appeals Court judge is assassinated in the Mansour district of Baghdad. Jawdat Naeib was shot (along with his driver) when his car was ambushed. He was also a member of the Supreme Judicial Council, the body which supervises and nominates members of the judiciary in Iraq.
- 15 January – United States Secretary of State, Condoleezza Rice visits Baghdad meeting with Prime Minister Nouri al-Maliki and Minister of Foreign Affairs Hoshyar Zebari.
- 16 January – A suicide bomber blows herself up near a Shia mosque in Khan Bani Saad, a town south of Baqubah, the capital of Diyala Governorate. 11 people were killed and eighteen others wounded in the attack.
- 17 January – The International Monetary Fund and the United Nations release reports suggesting Iraq is facing a period of economic growth and a stabilising political process. The IMF's Middle East and Central Asia department, said GDP growth may exceed 7% in 2008 and hold at between 7% and 8% in 2009 (in each case dependent on continuing oil production). Meanwhile, the UN praised political reconciliation efforts exemplified by the new laws regarding former Baathists returning to public employment.
- 22 January – The parliament of Iraq approves a new flag for the country. The new design no longer has the three green stars of the old flag, which represented the ideals of the Baath Party.
- 24 January – A suicide bomber kills a high-ranking police chief and two other police officers in Mosul at the site of an explosion that had killed at least 34 people and wounded at least 217 the day before. Brigadier General Salah Mohammed al-Jubouri, the director of police for Ninawa Governorate, was inspecting the scene of Wednesday's blast when gunmen ambushed his convoy.
- 25 January – After successive suicide attacks in Mosul in recent days, killing over 40 people including the city's police chief, Iraqi Prime Minister Nouri al-Maliki announces that Iraqi security forces and American troops were gathering for what he described as a "decisive" offensive against al-Qaeda in Iraq and its allies.

=== February ===
- 1 February – Two bombs explode in Baghdad animal markets killing 99 people and wounding 200. The Iraqi government claims that the bombs were carried by women and detonated remotely.
- 9 February – Two children in Baghdad die after eating cake contaminated with thallium and at least nine others are affected. The cake was given to people at an Iraqi sports club near the capital. The Secretary of the Iraqi Air Force and his daughter were among the victims.
- 13 February – The Iraqi parliament passes provincial powers law setting out relationship between the provinces and the central Iraqi government. It also demands that provincial elections be held before the end of 2008. These elections are scheduled for 1 October
- Also, the Iraqi parliament passes 2008 budget and an amnesty law.
- 19 February – The Iraq war has strained U.S. forces to the point where they could not fight another large-scale war, according to a survey of military officers.
- Tours of duty for U.S. soldiers in Iraq may be cut from 15 months to 12 if current improvements in security hold up.
- 22 February –
  - Approximately 10,000 Turkish Armed Forces cross the border into northern Iraq in an operation against Kurdish rebels from the Kurdistan Workers Party (PKK). The move followed an aerial bombing campaign which began on 21 February.
  - Moqtada Sadr orders a renewal of the ceasefire which the Mahdi Army has observed for the previous six months.
- 24 February –
  - Iraq's government has urged Turkey to rethink its military incursion against Kurdish rebels operating from bases in northern Iraq amid fears the escalating fighting could destabilize the region.
  - A leader of a Sunni Awakening Council group, Sheikh Ibrahim Mutayri al-Mohammedi, is killed in a suicide bombing in Falluja.
- 25 February –
  - The White House said it is in "constant dialogue" with Iraq and Turkey about the Turkish military operation against Kurdish rebels in northern Iraq.
  - A man in a wheelchair blew himself up in a northern Iraqi police station, killing three National Police officers, including a commander.
  - About 8,000 of the 30,000 "surge" troops sent to Iraq in 2007 will not go home as planned summer 2008, the Pentagon told.
- 26 February – One of five Britons believed to have been kidnapped 29 May 2007 in Baghdad pleaded with the British government to release prisoners sought by his captors so "we can go home."
- 29 February –
  - The cousin of Saddam Hussein Ali Hassan al-Majid, known by the nickname "Chemical Ali" for his role in a chemical weapons attack on Iraqi Kurds in the 1980s, will be executed, Iraqi officials told.
  - According to reports given by the Catholic News Service, Archbishop Paulos Faraj Rahho was kidnapped from his car in the Al-Nur district of the city; his bodyguards and driver were killed. The kidnappers demanded that the Assyrian Christians contribute to the jihad, through jizya. The captors are also believed to have demanded the release of Arab (Non-Iraqi) detainees and that they be paid a ransom for Rahho's release.

=== March ===
- 1 March – Twenty-nine U.S. troops died in Iraq during February 2008, the third-lowest total of the nearly five-year-old war.
- 3 March – A pair of car bombings targeting Iraqi security forces killed at least 18 people and wounded dozens in Baghdad.
- 6 March – Fifty-three people were killed and 125 were wounded in two bomb attacks in a Baghdad commercial district.
- 8 March – A mass grave holding an estimated 100 bodies was found in an orchard in Iraq's Diyala Governorate, just north of Baqubah.
- 10 March –
  - In 2008, its fifth year, the war will cost approximately $12 billion a month, triple the "burn" rate of its earliest years, Nobel Prize-winning economist Joseph E. Stiglitz reported.
  - Two bombings, in Baghdad and Diyala Governorate, killed eight U.S. troops.
- 12 March – Eleven militants were killed by Iraqi police raids against the Mahdi Army, after radical Shiite cleric Muqtada al-Sadr declared that members of the Mahdi Army could defend themselves if attacked by U.S. troops.
- 13 March –
  - It was reported that Archbishop Paulos Faraj Rahho's body had been found buried in a shallow grave near Mosul. Officials of the Chaldean Church in Iraq said they had received a call telling them where the body was buried. Reports over the cause of death were somewhat contradictory. An official of the morgue in Mosul said the archbishop, who had health problems, including high blood pressure and diabetes, might have died of natural causes. Police at the Mosul morgue said the Archbishop appeared to have been dead a week and his body bore no bullet wounds. He is believed to be the highest-ranking Chaldean Catholic Church official killed since the 2003 conflict began.
- 17 March –
  - A report by the International Committee of the Red Cross suggested that Iraq was on the brink of a full-scale humanitarian crisis some 5 years after US-led military operations began. The report indicated that millions of Iraqis continue to have little or no access to clean water, sanitation or healthcare.
  - A female suicide bomber apparently targeting Shiite worshippers killed at least 33 people and wounded at least 50 in Karbala.
- 18 March – The smuggling of stolen antiquities from Iraq's rich cultural heritage is helping finance Iraqi extremist groups, said the U.S. investigator who led the initial investigation into the looting of Baghdad's National Museum.
- 19 March –
  - The top U.S. commander in Iraq, Gen. David Petraeus, said Iran continues to support Iraqi insurgents and Syria is allowing foreign fighters passage into Iraq.
  - The war in Iraq is widely unpopular among U.S.-citizens: A CNN/Opinion Research Corp. poll found only 32 percent of Americans support the conflict. And 61 percent said they want the next president to remove most U.S. troops within a few months of taking office.
- 20 March –
  - The International Rescue Committee issued a report detailing the plight of Iraqi refugees on the five-year anniversary of the U.S.-led invasion of Iraq.
  - In a videotape, broadcast by Al Jazeera, the voice identified as Osama bin Laden declares "Iraq is the perfect base to set up the jihad to liberate Palestine."
  - On the fifth anniversary of the launch of Operation Iraqi Freedom, President Bush noted that the war in Iraq had been "longer and harder and more costly than we anticipated" and that there was "still hard work to be done" to maintain gains that were "fragile and reversible". But he said that the surge was "working" and had "opened the door to a major strategic victory in the broader war on terror". He ended by telling American soldiers that "with your courage, the battle in Iraq will end in victory."
- 21 March –
  - A U.S. soldier is killed and four others wounded by indirect fire south of Baghdad.
  - A suicide bomber detonated a small truck rigged with explosives outside a local Awakening Council leader's house just east of Samarra, killing at least five people and wounding 13 others. Awakening Councils are largely Sunni security groups that have been recruited by the U.S. military.
- 22 March –
  - Three U.S. soldiers were killed by a roadside bomb that struck their vehicle while they were on patrol in northwestern Baghdad. Two Iraqi civilians were also killed in the attack. The deaths bring to 3,996 the number of U.S. service members who have died since the Iraq war began in 2003.
  - Another roadside bomb blast struck an Iraqi police patrol in Kirkuk, killing a civilian and wounding nine people.
- 23 March –
  - Four U.S. soldiers died in a roadside bombing in southern Baghdad, bringing the American toll since the beginning of the war on 19 March 2003 to the grim milestone of 4,000 deaths. Of the 4,000 U.S. military personnel killed in the war, 3,263 have been killed in attacks and fighting and 737 in non-hostile incidents, such as traffic accidents and suicides. Meanwhile, estimates of the Iraqi death toll range from about 80,000 to the hundreds of thousands, with another 2 million forced to leave the country and 2.5 million people displaced within Iraq. Mowaffak al-Rubaie, Iraqi National Security Advisor, told the war in Iraq is part of "a global terrorism hitting everywhere, and they have chosen Iraq to be a battlefield". Nearly 160,000 U.S. troops remain in Iraq, and the war has cost U.S. taxpayers about $600 billion.
  - Sen. Bob Menendez of New Jersey said President George W. Bush "took us to war on the wings of a lie."
  - U.S. troops raided a suspected suicide bomber cell in Diyala province, killing a dozen militants, half of whom had shaved their bodies—which the U.S. military says indicates they were in the final stage of preparation for a suicide attack. At least four Al-Qaeda in Iraq members were killed in volatile Diyala province.
  - A suicide car bomb exploded at a fuel station in a predominantly Shiite neighborhood in northwest Baghdad, killing seven people and wounding 12 others.
  - The military also reported a roadside bombing that killed two children and wounded two civilians. It occurred in Khatoon, north of the Diyala provincial capital of Baqubah.
  - A suicide bomber detonated a truck full of explosives outside the main gate of an Iraqi military base in Mosul, killing at least 10 Iraqi soldiers and wounding 35 people, including 20 soldiers.
  - A mortar round landed in a Shiite neighborhood in eastern Baghdad, killing seven people and injuring nine others. Six more mortar rounds landed in other Baghdad neighborhoods, killing three people.
  - In southeastern Baghdad, gunmen riding in at least two cars opened fire on a crowded outdoor market, killing at least three people and wounding 17 others.
- 25 March – The political movement of powerful Shiite cleric Muqtada al-Sadr launched a nationwide civil disobedience campaign across Iraq to protest raids and detentions against the Mahdi Army. The Battle of Basra (2008) between Iraqi security forces and al-Sadr's Mahdi Army militia left 50 dead and spread to several Baghdad districts. The discord also threatens to unravel a much-praised suspension of Mahdi Army militia activity since August 2007, and its collapse could spark renewed sectarian violence and prompt the United States to delay any troop withdrawals.
- 26 March –
  - Clashes between Iraqi security forces and Mahdi Army fighters spread from the key oil city of Basra and parts of Baghdad to the Shiite heartland of Al Diwaniyah and Kut, with the death toll rising past 100 after the start of fighting on 24 March 2008. At least 35 people have died in Kut and one person was killed and four were wounded in Diwaniya.
  - At least nine people were killed and 23 wounded during clashes between militants and Iraqi police in neighborhoods around the city of Hilla and in a U.S. air strike that killed four.
  - President George W. Bush discussed war with the chiefs of the armed services. The military was expected to recommend delaying further withdrawals of U.S. troops once the surge troops are withdrawn.
  - Indirect fire attacks on the American seat of power in Baghdad continued, with three Americans seriously injured and another dying of wounds he received a few days ago.
  - Nouri al-Maliki, Prime Minister of Iraq briefed city and provincial officials about the Battle of Basra (2008) and vowed to finish the job, even if it takes a month.
- 27 March –
  - The British military admitted that it breached the human rights of an Iraqi man, named Baha Mousa, who died in custody, and that its soldiers also violated the rights of eight other detained Iraqis.
  - Forty-two people were killed in Kut, the latest casualties since the start of the clashes between the Mahdi Army and Iraqi security forces on 24 March 2008. There was also fighting in Jamhouriya, one of five neighborhoods the Mehdi Army controls, and Muqal.
  - A U.S. government official was killed when militants fired rockets into the Green Zone.
  - Dozens of gunmen kidnapped the spokesman of the Baghdad security plan, Tahseen Sheikhly. Three of his guards were killed and his house burned in the attack.
  - A car bomb explosion killed three people and wounded five others near a police patrol in central Baghdad.
  - President George W. Bush on 27 March 2008 called the Iraqi government's move to launch the Battle of Basra (2008) against the Mahdi Army a "bold decision." He will carefully weigh recommendations from his commanders Gen. David Petraeus and U.S. Ambassador to Iraq Ryan Crocker about how the United States should proceed in Iraq after the 2007-military buildup ends in the summer of 2008.
  - Iraq's government imposed a curfew, which took effect at 11 p.m. 27 March 2008 (4 p.m. ET), bans pedestrian, motorcycle and vehicle traffic through 5 p.m. 30 March 2008 in Baghdad and U.S. Embassy workers in Iraq were told to remain in secure buildings and wear protective clothing as rockets continued to rain down on Baghdad's Green Zone.
- 28 March –
  - Baghdad was on virtual lockdown as a tough new curfew ordered everyone off the streets of the Iraqi capital and five other cities until 5 p.m. 30 March 2008.
  - At least 14 people were killed and 61 wounded during clashes between Iraqi security forces and the insurgents of the Mahdi Army in Sadr City of Baghdad. Some of the deaths resulted from U.S. airstrikes, which have been supporting Iraqi ground fighting.
  - A special session of the 275-seat Council of Representatives of Iraq convened to discuss ways to stem the violence but fell far short of a quorum, blocking lawmakers from taking action.
  - The Iraqi government offered cash to people who surrender medium and heavy weapons by 8 April 2008.
  - President George W. Bush praised the Battle of Basra (2008) as "a defining moment in the history of a free Iraq".
  - One U.S. soldier was killed by a roadside bomb south of the city Baghdad.
  - A U.S. military analysis of the Battle of Basra (2008) indicated the government push was not going as well as American officials had hoped.
- 29 March –
  - U.S. warplanes and British artillery struck targets in Basra. Another Basra airstrike killed 10 fighters, and a joint U.S.-Iraqi patrol killed 7 more fighters in southeastern Baghdad's Suwayrah district.
  - Two U.S. soldiers were killed by a roadside bomb in eastern Baghdad.
  - A curfew that was imposed on Basra was lifted.
- 30 March –
  - A strict curfew was extended indefinitely in Baghdad as the death toll mounted from the Battle of Basra (2008) between Iraqi security forces and the Mahdi Army to more than 280 people. Death tolls are difficult to obtain, but reports from Iraqi and coalition authorities suggest more than 400 people have died since fighting began 25 March 2008.
  - The U.S. military death toll in Iraq now stands at 4,007.
  - Turkey's military told it killed at least 15 rebels in operations in northern Iraq in the week of 24 March 2008, but a spokesman for the Iraqi Kurdish Regional Security Forces denied the report, saying Turkey has not conducted any military operation or air assault there in the weeks of 24 March 2008 and 17 March 2008.
  - Shiite cleric Muqtada al-Sadr called on the Mahdi Army to stop shooting and cooperate with Iraqi security forces, a move Iraq's government praised as a step toward ending six days of fighting, including Battle of Basra (2008), that has left hundreds dead. Witnesses reported continued clashes throughout the day in Basra even after the announcements. But Iraqi authorities said after al-Sadr's announcement they would lift an indefinite curfew that had been imposed on Baghdad since 27 March 2008.
  - In northern Iraq, five Iraqi police officers were killed and two bystanders were wounded when gunmen attacked a police patrol in the town of Dhuluiyah.
  - The U.S. military said it found a mass grave with 14 bodies near Muqdadiya. The bodies, which showed signs of torture, appeared to have been in the grave for two to six months. They were found 100 yards from where 37 bodies were found buried 28 March 2008.
  - Ten people were killed when a suicide car bomb struck a checkpoint manned by members of the Awakening Council. Four members of the council were among the dead. Also in Baiji, a child was killed and seven civilians were wounded when a mortar landed in a residential area 29 March 2008.
  - In Samarra, gunmen stormed the home of an Awakening Council member, killing him and his son. His wife and daughter were wounded in the 29 March 2008 morning attack, Samarra police said.
- 31 March – The curfew imposed on Baghdad is scheduled to be lifted 6 a.m.

=== April ===
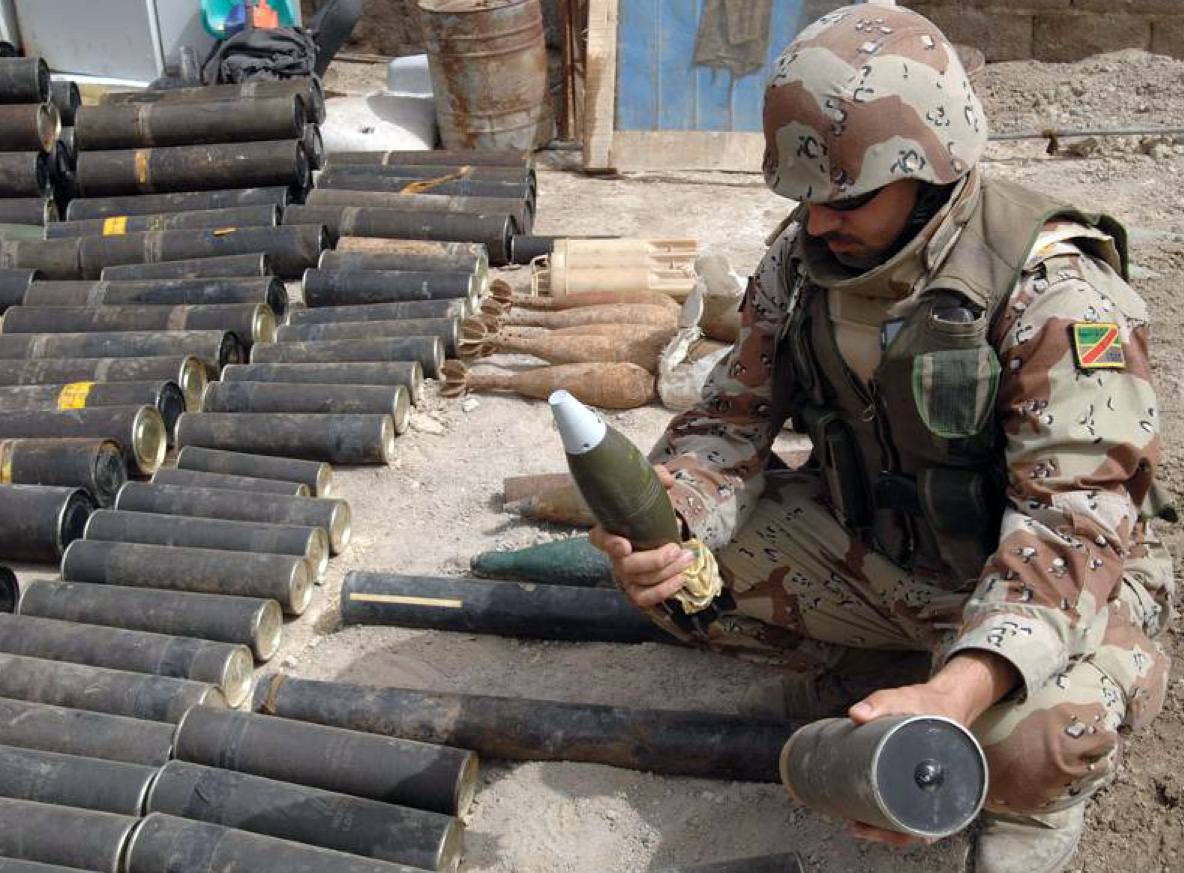
An Iraqi soldier from the 1st QRF division examines a mortar captured during clearing operations in Hayaniya, 19 April

- 1 April – The British defense minister, Des Browne, said that the number of British troops in Iraq will remain at the current level of around 4,000 for the time being, particularly in light of the Battle of Basra (2008) in the week of 24 March 2008.
- 2 April – Al-Sadr's Sadrist Movement called for millions of Iraqis to demonstrate against the U.S. presence in Iraq, a protest that would coincide with scheduled testimony in Washington D C from top U.S. officials in Iraq and the anniversary of the toppling of the Saddam Hussein-regime.
- 3 April –
  - Shiite cleric Muqtada al-Sadr offered to help purge Iraqi security forces of Mahdi Army-members. But he also criticized the Iraqi government for denying that it sent envoys to him to discuss the Battle of Basra (2008) in the week of 24 March 2008. The Iraqi government said the operation that began 25 March targeted criminals who had been carrying out indiscriminate attacks, burglaries and oil smuggling. Prime Minister Nouri al-Maliki called the Battle of Basra (2008) but said it exposed weaknesses in the security forces, including operational snafus and troop desertions that he said will be addressed and reviewed. He brushed off criticism that the widespread action was poorly planned, was politically motivated and failed to dislodge the renegade militias from their strongholds across Basra. Al-Maliki promised a major offensive targeting Al-Qaeda in Iraq in the northern city of Mosul.
  - A Sadr City resident said mosque loudspeakers blared the call to protest.
- 4 April – Saleh al-Ageili, a spokesman for the Sadrist Movement, reported that Muqtada al-Sadr had called for peaceful demonstrations in Sadr City after prayers "to protest the campaign of raids carried out by the occupier."
- 7 April –
  - The Pentagon said it does not expect Gen. David Petraeus to recommend or predict additional U.S. troop cuts in Iraq, beyond the 20,000 U.S. troops returning home as the troop "surge" ends in July 2008, when he testifies before his "State of Iraq" report to the United States Congress on 8 April 2008 and 9 April 2008. After the surge ends in July 2008, there will be 15 U.S. combat brigade teams in Iraq, and roughly 140,000 American troops.
  - White House spokesman Tony Fratto admitted the Battle of Basra (2008)-operation was not "an overall success" for Iraqi government forces.
- 8 April –
  - Gen. David Petraeus, the commander of multinational forces in Iraq, and Ambassador Ryan Crocker answered questions from key member of the United States Senate. All three leading presidential candidates—Democratic Sens. Hillary Clinton and Barack Obama, and Republican Sen. John McCain – questioned Petraeus and Crocker.
  - Gen. David Petraeus, the commander of multinational forces in Iraq, and Ambassador Ryan Crocker, told the United States Senate Committee on Armed Services and the United States Senate Committee on Foreign Relations that Iranian agents and weapons are fueling the ongoing strife there and that further U.S. troop withdrawals will have to wait. Although the last of the additional U.S. combat brigades dispatched in 2007 is scheduled to leave in June 2008, Petraeus said he would recommend against further withdrawals for at least 45 days. Future troop levels be based on conditions on the ground. In the seven months since their last appearance before Congress, U.S. and Iraqi forces made progress toward tamping down the violence but the progress was "fragile" and "reversible."
  - Petraeus told senators the Iraqi government's operation Battle of Basra (2008) "could have been better planned, and the preparation could have been better." He said that once the forces got into Basra, "they ended up going into action more quickly than anticipated" and Prime Minister Nouri al-Maliki didn't follow his advice to move at a more careful pace.
  - Opening the Senate hearings, the Armed Services Committee chairman, Carl Levin, said the United States must come up with a timeline for ending its involvement in Iraq.
  - When asked by Republican Senator John Warner whether the Iraq War is making the U.S. safer, Petraeus stated that it would ultimately be up to history.
  - Republican Senator Chuck Hagel asked about Ambassador Ryan Crocker's "diplomatic surge," and its apparent lack of results in the region.
  - Senator George Voinovich, a Republican, broke with his party line, saying the country is, "kind of bankrupted ... in a recession."
  - Republican Senator Bob Corker asked for an articulated exit strategy.
  - John McCain, the top Republican on the United States Senate Committee on Armed Services and a leading advocate of the 2007-troop increase, said the United States is no longer "staring into the abyss of defeat" as a result.
  - Hillary Clinton said it would be "irresponsible" to continue a failed policy in Iraq. She said it is "time to begin an orderly process of withdrawing our troops" from Iraq in order to focus on Afghanistan and other U.S. interests.
  - Barack Obama, a member of the United States Senate Committee on Foreign Relations, questioned whether the conditions set by U.S. commanders for withdrawal would lead to a war that could last until 2028 or 2038. He called the invasion of Iraq a "massive strategic blunder" that allowed Al-Qaeda and Iran to spread their influence into Iraq, and said the United States should pressure Iraqi officials to settle the war by threatening to leave. Senator Barack Obama remarked, "if the definition of success is so high: no traces of Al Qaida and no possibility of reconstitution, a highly-effective Iraqi government, a democratic multi-ethnic, multi-sectarian functioning democracy with no Iranian influence, at least not of the kind that we don't like, then that portends the possibility of us staying for 20 or 30 years. If, on the other hand, our criteria is a messy, sloppy status quo but there's not huge outbreaks of violence, there's still corruption, but the country is struggling along, but it's not a threat to its neighbors and it's not an Al Qaida base, that seems to me an achievable goal within a measurable timeframe."
  - America's ambassador to Iraq, Ryan Crocker, said that the United States has to keep its forces in Iraq unless it wants Iran to have a free hand in Iraq.
- 9 April – Gen. David Petraeus, the commander of multinational forces in Iraq, and Ambassador Ryan Crocker answered questions from United States House of Representatives members.
- 10 April –
  - President George W. Bush is expected to announce the shortening of the Army combat-zone tours from 15 months to 12 months as of the summer of 2008.
  - Unmanned aerial vehicles targeted and killed six "heavily armed criminals" in northeastern Baghdad.
- 11 April –
  - Muqtada al-Sadr accused Iraqi and U.S. forces of attacking Sadr City, just hours after the Shiite cleric called for calm in the wake of the assassination of Sayyed Riyadh al-Nuri, one of his top aides in the southern city of Najaf. Sheikh Fowzi Saad al-Obeidi called the killing an "act of provocation" after the "siege of Sadr City." He was referring to the battles since 6 April 2008 involving members of al-Sadr's Mahdi Army militia and Iraqi security forces dominated by a rival Shiite political movement, the Supreme Islamic Iraqi Council. That fighting started with the Battle of Basra (2008) and spread to other Shiite regions, including Sadr City and the Babil provincial capital of Hilla. The intra-Shiite fighting in Iraq that has killed hundreds of people in the past two weeks involved two main movements: members of the Mahdi Army militia loyal to Muqtada al-Sadr, and Iraqi security forces dominated by the chief political rival of the Sadrists, the Islamic Supreme Council of Iraq. The al-Nuri assassination prompted officials to expand the daily curfew in Hilla. 17 people killed over 24 hours in airstrikes, fighting and attacks in areas wracked in recent weeks by fighting among Shiites. Witnesses and media reported heavy fighting between U.S.-backed Iraqi troops and al-Sadr's Mahdi Army militia. U.S. troops working in support of Iraqi soldiers killed two snipers. At the same time at least six roadside bombs damaged vehicles in a U.S. Army convoy that was transporting barriers for a group of Iraqi Army soldiers establishing a checkpoint.
  - Unmanned aerial vehicles targeted and killed six suspected insurgents in Basra.
  - Suicide bombings killed at least four people—three of them police. The first bombing was in Ramadi, the provincial capital of the predominantly Sunni Anbar province. At least three national police officers were killed. The second attack took place at a checkpoint about 20 km north of Baiji, the bomber and one other person a local Awakening Council were killed. Also, at least three people were killed in a mortar attack on Baghdad's Palestine Hotel.
- 14 April – Three people died in the nearby city of Tal Afar when a suicide attacker blew himself up at an Iraqi soldier's funeral.
- 15 April – A wave of bombings blamed on Al-Qaeda in Iraq-jihadists shook Baghdad, Baquba, Ramadi and Mosul, killing at least 60 people. Nonetheless, the overall violence in Baquba has decreased by 80 percent since June 2007.
- 17 April – A suicide bomber killed at least 15 people and wounded many others in a suicide attack on a crowd of mourners in Baquba, during the funerall of two members of a local group who had died fighting al-Qaeda in Iraq militants.
- 22 April – A female suicide bomber killed six people and wounded a dozen others when she blew herself up north of Baghdad according to Iraqi police.
- 29 April – In April 2008, the United States government accused an alleged Iranian-backed insurgency of launching attacks on Iraqi civilians and US-led multinational forces and claimed that approximately 90 percent of foreign militants entered Iraq through Syria, but again, provided no proof. "Iran and Syria must stop the flow of weapons and foreign fighters into Iraq, and their malign interference in Iraq," U.S. Ambassador Zalmay Khalilzad said Monday in a report to the U.N. Security Council on behalf of the multinational force in Iraq. The Iranian and Syrian governments, however, have repeatedly denied trying to destabilize Iraq and insist there is no proof.

=== May ===
- 2 May – An Iraqi delegation in Iran gave Iranian security officials evidence purporting to show that Tehran was providing support for Shi'ite militias battling Iraqi government forces. According to Haidar al-Ibadi, a member of Iraqi Prime Minister Nuri al-Maliki's Islamic Dawa Party, list of names, training camps and cells linked to Iran were presented to the Iranian officials. The Iranian officials denied the accusations and the Iraqi government has since announced that there is no hard evidence against Iran.
- 8 May – A man originally thought to be the leader of al-Qaeda in Iraq, Abu Ayyub al-Masri, is arrested in Mosul.
- 31 May – The U.S. Department of Defense reports 19 deaths, the lowest total deaths this month since the invasion began.

=== June ===
- 10 June – Iraqi police launch an operation in Dhi Qar Governorate, capturing 55 suspected Mahdi Army members.
- 14 June – Iraqi troops begin an offensive in the southern governorate of Maysan. The operation began when helicopters dropped leaflets over the provincial capital Amarah urging residents to cooperate with security forces. Iraqi security forces closed down the border with Iran and began patrols in Amarah. There were no reports of major clashes, as many militia leaders are believed to have fled into Iran following operations in Sadr City in April and May.

=== July ===
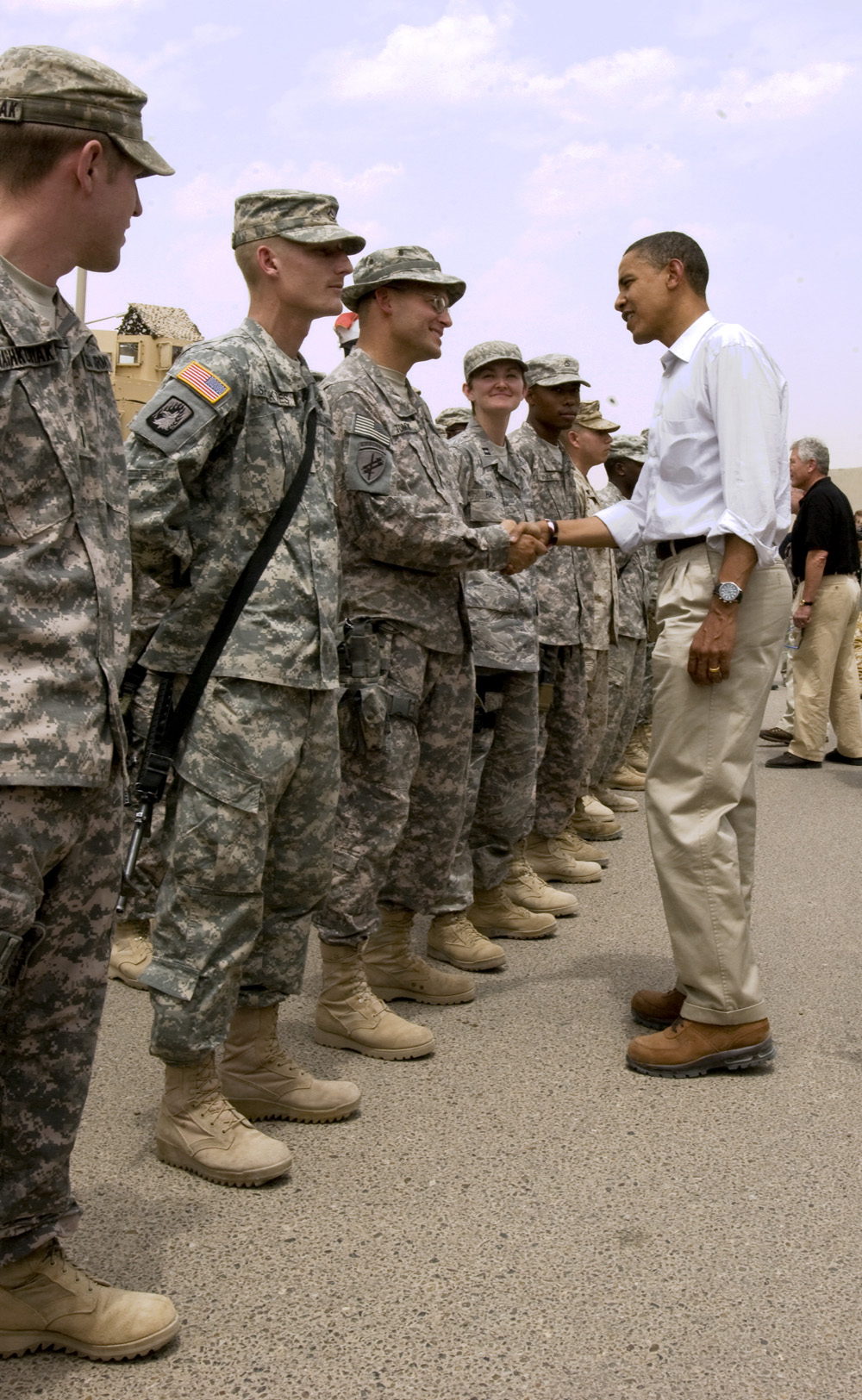
Senator Barack Obama shakes hands with a U.S. Soldier outside Multi-National Division South East Headquarters in Basra, during his visit in Iraq, 21 July 2008.

- 15 July - 35 killed and 63 injured in a double suicide bombing attack on a crowd of 200 applicants at an army recruiting station.
- 20 July – Al Najaf International Airport is officially opened for commercial flights, after 3 years of development.
- 23 July – Admiral Mike Mullen, Staff Chairman the Joint Chiefs of Staff, said that while the situation in Afghanistan is "precarious and urgent," the 10,000 additional troops needed there would be unavailable "in any significant manner" unless withdrawals from Iraq were made. Mullen stated that "my priorities ... given to me by the commander in chief are: Focus on Iraq first. It's been that way for some time. Focus on Afghanistan second."
- 26 July – In a report published by the AP, Robert Burns, the AP's chief military reporter, and Robert Reid, the AP bureau chief in Baghdad, say the tide of war in Iraq had turned dramatically, with formerly violent neighborhoods rid of extremists and Iraqi civilians filling public parks, confident in their newfound, albeit fragile peace.
- 29 July – 50,000 Iraqi soldiers and police, supported by U.S. troops, launch Operation Augurs of Prosperity in Diyala Governorate, north-east of Baghdad. Iraqi forces faced little resistance, since insurgents were believed to have fled the area before the offensive.

=== August ===
- 14 August – A female suicide bomber strikes Shia pilgrims south of Baghdad, killing at least 18 people and wounding dozens more.
- 16 August – Task Force 34 enters Iraq.
- 21 August – US negotiators and Iraq negotiators agree on a withdrawal of all US troops in Iraq by 2011.

=== September ===
- 1 September – The US military transferred control of Anbar province to the Iraqi government. Anbar is the largest of Iraq's 18 provinces, and is the eleventh province to be handed over to Iraq by coalition forces.
- 17 September – A U.S. Soldier from 610 ESC 14th Engineer Battalion, 555 Engineer Brigade is killed in a tragic Humvee accident just south of Baghdad.
- 20 September – At least three people were killed by a suicide car bomb near a soccer field where young men were playing in Tal Afar.
- 21 September – At least 35 people were wounded and one killed in seven violent incidents in Baghdad, including seven bombings and two gun attacks.
- 28 September – At least 27 people were killed and 84 wounded in five separate bombings in Baghdad coming close to the end of the Muslim holy month of Ramadan.

=== October ===
- 4 October – Polish troops in Iraq hold a ceremony at Camp Echo in Qadasiyah Province to mark the end of their mission in Iraq. U.S. troops from the 2nd Brigade, 4th Infantry Division took over responsibilities for the area of operations vacated by the Poles.
- 26 October – A Syrian government source claimed four US helicopters coming from Iraq violated the Syrian airspace.
- 28 October – U.S. officials said the US helicopter raid that took place two days earlier, into Syria killed Abu Ghadiyah, a key figure involved in the smuggling of foreign fighters into Iraq.
- 29 October –
  - Iraqi authorities take over responsibility for security of Wasit province from US military forces making it the 13th of Iraq's 18 provinces to be transferred.
  - The last contingent of Polish troops land in Polish city of Szczecin, marking the end of their country's mission in Iraq.

=== November ===
- 17 November – The US and the Iraqi Government sign the US-Iraq Status of Forces Agreement providing for the withdrawal of US troops from Iraqi cities by 30 June 2009 and a complete withdrawal of US forces from Iraq by the end of 2011.

=== December ===
- 4 December – The Czech Republic mission to Iraq ends.
- 5 December – The South Korean mission to Iraq ends.
- 9 December – The Ukrainian mission to Iraq ends.
- 14 December – On 14 December 2008 then-U.S. President George W. Bush signed the security pact with Iraq. In his fourth and final trip to Iraq, the president appeared with Iraq's prime minister and said more work is to be done. During the press conference discussing the signing of the pact with Prime Minister Nuri al-Maliki in his palace in the heavily fortified Green Zone, President Bush dodged two shoes thrown at him from the audience. The man who threw the shoes, Muntadhar al-Zaidi, an Iraqi journalist with Egypt-based al-Baghdadia television network, could be heard yelling in Arabic: "This is a farewell ... you dog!" When throwing the second shoe, he could be heard yelling "This is for the widows, the orphans and those who were killed in Iraq!" While pinned on the ground by security personnel, he screamed: "You killed the Iraqis!" As the man's screaming could be heard outside, Bush said "That's what people do in a free society, draw attention to themselves."
- 17 December – The Moldovan, Bulgarian, and Albanian missions to Iraq end.

== Notable deaths ==
- 3 January – Andrew J. Olmsted, 37, American army blogger in Iraq, shot.
- 27 January – Alan G. Rogers, 40, American Army major, improvised explosive device.
- 10 February – Alaa Abdulkareem Fartusi, 29, Iraqi journalist and cameraman, bomb blast.
- 11 February – Fouad al-Tikerly, 81, Iraqi novelist and judge, pancreatic cancer.
- 15 February – Naziha Salim, 81, Iraqi painter, complications from a stroke.
- 27 February – Shihab al-Tamimi, 74, Iraqi head of the Journalists Syndicate, heart attack following shooting.
- 3 October – Mahir al-Zubaydi, Iraqi al-Qaeda leader, shot.
- 5 October – Mohamed Moumou, 43, Iraqi al-Qaida second-in-command, shot.
- 18 December – Nahla Hussain al-Shaly, 37, Iraqi women's rights activist, shot and decapitated.

== See also ==
- Iraq War
