= 2012 in Iraq =

- Decades: 1990s; 2000s; 2010s; 2020s
- See also: Other events of 2012; List of years in Iraq

The following lists events in 2012 in Iraq.

== Incumbents ==
- President: Jalal Talabani
- Prime Minister: Nouri al-Maliki
- Vice President: Khodair al-Khozaei Tariq al-Hashimi (until September 10)

== Events ==
- 2012–2013 Iraqi protests

=== January ===
- January 5 – A series of explosions occur in mainly Shia Muslim neighbourhoods of Baghdad and in the city of Nasiriyah, with at least 73 killed and 149 wounded.
- January 6 – Asa'ib Ahl al-Haq, the Iranian-backed Shiite militia that carried out deadly attacks on U.S. troops agrees to lay down its arms and join the political process in Iraq.
- January 14 – A suicide bomber kills at least 53 people and injures more than 130 in Basra.
- January 15 – Insurgents trigger bombs and storm a police station in Ramadi, with six people reportedly killed and 14 injured.

=== February ===
- February 12 – Turkish warplanes carry out strikes against PKK hideouts in northern Iraq.
- February 19 – A suicide bomber kills at least 19 officers and cadets and injures 26 outside an Iraqi police academy in northeastern Baghdad.
- February 23 – A series of attacks across Iraq leave at least 60 killed and more than 200 injured.

=== March ===
- March 5 – Gunmen disguised as police kill 27 members of Iraq's security forces in the town of Haditha.
- March 12 – Robbers kill at least 9 people and injure 14 in a jewelry heist in East Baghdad.
- March 20 – At least 50 are killed and more than 240 injured in a wave of terror attacks across 10 cities in Iraq.
- March 21 – Iraq is terrorised by unconfirmed reports of extremists crushing the skulls of "emos" with blocks of cement.

=== April ===
- April 3 – Qatar rejects Iraq's demand to hand over fugitive Vice President Tariq Al-Hashemi.
- April 19 – At least 36 people are killed and almost 150 others are injured in bombings in Baghdad, Kirkuk and Samarra.
- April 26 – At least 10 killed and 15 injured in two explosions at a popular coffee shop in the Diyala province.

=== May ===
- May 8 – National Foundation Congress is founded.
- May 26 – Ten killed and at least ten others injured in a series of attacks targeting Iraqi military patrols in Al-Suwaira, Mosul and east of Baqubah.

=== June ===
- June 13 – ِA series of 42 attacks across Iraqi cities results in the death of 72 people and over 250 injured.

== Deaths ==
- March 5 – Mohammad Shafar, Awakening movement leader.
- March 23 – Naji Talib, politician who served as Prime Minister of Iraq from 1966 to 1967.
- June 7 – Abid Hamid Mahmud, military officer and Saddam Hussein's personal secretary.
- September 19 – Behnam Abu Alsoof, archaeologist and historian.(b.1931)
