= 2014 in Iraq =

- Decades: 1990s; 2000s; 2010s; 2020s
- See also: Other events of 2014; List of years in Iraq

The following lists events that happened during 2014 in Iraq.

== Incumbents ==
- President: Jalal Talabani (until July 24), Fuad Masum (starting July 24)
- Prime Minister: Nouri al-Maliki (until September 9), Haider al-Abadi (starting September 9)
- Vice President: Khodair al-Khozaei (until September 9), Nouri al-Maliki, Usama al-Nujayfi, Ayad Allawi (starting September 9)

== Events ==
=== January ===
- January 2 – War in Iraq (2013–2017)
  - Armed tribesmen and ISIS militants control the Iraqi cities of Fallujah and Ramadi, after days of violence that erupted as a protest camp was removed.
  - 13 people are killed in a suicide bombing in Balad Ruz, near Baqubah.
- January 4 – The Iraqi government loses control of Fallujah to Islamist militants.
- January 9 – A suicide bomber kills 23 Iraqi army recruits and wounds 36 in Baghdad.
- January 12 – A car bombing at a bus station in central Baghdad kills at least nine people.
- January 15 – At least 26 people are killed in a series of attacks in central Iraq.
- January 16 – TMZ reveals photos of United States Marines burning bodies of Iraqis prompting an investigation from the Department of Defense.
- January 21–26 people convicted of terrorism charges are hanged in Iraq.
- January 25–17 people are killed in car-bomb and mortar attacks on a Shi'ite Muslim village.
- January 30 – Six suicide bombers take over the Iraqi Ministry of Transportation in Baghdad and kill at least 24 hostages before security forces take control.

=== February ===
- February 5 – A wave of bombings hits central Baghdad with at least 16 people dead.
- February 6 – Seven car bombings across Baghdad, kill at least 13 people.
- February 10 – A car bomb detonates prematurely in Baghdad, killing 21 militants. In a separate event, a car bomb hits a convoy transporting Usama al-Nujayfi with a bodyguard being wounded.
- February 11–16 Iraqi soldiers are killed by militants in an attack on military outposts protecting an oil pipeline in northern Iraq.
- February 17 – At least 25 people are killed and dozens wounded in bombing attacks across Baghdad; three bombs exploded in public markets and a fourth outside a Shiite mosque.
- February 27 – A wave of bombings in Baghdad kills 53 people.

=== March ===
- March 9 – A suicide car bomber kills 42 people at a police checkpoint in Hillah.
- March 20 – A suicide bomber attacks a café in Baghdad, killing 12 people and injuring another 38.
- March 21 – Gunmen attack a police headquarters north of Baghdad and suicide bombers strike across Iraq killing 25 people and injuring dozens.

=== April ===
- April 4 – Attacks in Baghdad and predominantly Sunni Arab areas of northern and western Iraq kill nine people.
- April 13 – A suicide truck bomber detonates at a police station in Kirkuk Governorate, killing eight policemen.
- April 22 – A balloting station on the outskirts of Kirkuk, is attacked by militants, leaving 10 people dead.
- April 25 – At least 25 people are killed and several injured in a series of bomb blasts targeted at Shi'ite rally in Baghdad. The attack comes less than a week before Iraqis are due to vote in parliamentary elections.
- April 27 – Iraqi helicopters destroy a convoy of ISIL fuel tankers inside Syrian territory.
- April 28 – Suicide bomb attacks kill dozens of people at a political rally and at early polling places for the election to be held on April 30.
- April 30 – Voters in Iraq go to the polls for parliamentary elections that have already been marred by violence from the Islamic State of Iraq and the Levant.

=== May ===
- May 12 – 49 people have been killed and 69 wounded in a series of attacks across Iraq including attack by Iraqi security forces on insurgents in Al Anbar Governorate.
- May 13 – The International Criminal Court will conduct a preliminary examination in the claims that United Kingdom forces abused Iraqi detainees between 2003 and 2008.
- May 27 – At least 35 people killed, 70 injured in bomb attacks in Baghdad and Anbar.

=== June ===
- June 6 – Attacks across Iraq kill 27 people.
- June 7 – Iraqi insurgency (post-U.S. withdrawal)
  - Islamic State of Iraq and the Levant gunmen storm the campus of the University of Anbar, killing 3 guards and holding dozens of students hostage before withdrawing.
  - The dead bodies of 21 policemen who were kidnapped a day before by militants are recovered in Mosul.
  - At least 52 people are dead following a series of bombings in Baghdad.
- June 8 – At least 13 people are killed and 60 injured as a result of a double bombing at the offices of the Patriotic Union of Kurdistan in Jalula, Diyala region.
- June 9 – A suicide truck bomber detonates his vehicle at the gate of a Patriotic Union of Kurdistan office in Tuz Khormato, a second truck bomb detonated as people were gathering around the first one. Over 15 are killed and at least 110 injured.
- June 10 – Militants stage an overnight attack in Mosul, taking control of the city while police and military flee.
- June 11 – Insurgents continue their offensive, gaining control of the city of Tikrit, the second provincial capital to fall in as many days. At least 500,000 residents of Mosul flee the fighting and head east into Kurdish-controlled territory, while insurgents storm the Turkish Embassy and take 48 Turks hostage, including the Consul General.
- June 12 – Iraqi insurgency (post-U.S. withdrawal)
  - The United Nations Security Council meets to discuss the rapid progress of an Islamic State of Iraq and the Levant offensive towards Baghdad.
  - Iraqi Kurds take over control of the city of Kirkuk as the army flees.
  - The Parliament of Iraq postpones a vote on Prime Minister Nouri Maliki's call for a state of emergency due to a lack of quorum.
- June 14 – A bomb explodes in the town of Mayadin in Deir al-Zor province near the Iraqi border killing 8.
- June 15 – The United States evacuates personnel from its embassy in Baghdad as Islamic State in Iraq and the Levant nears the city.
- June 16 – 2014 Northern Iraq offensive
  - ISIL takes control of the town of Tal Afar.
  - The Pentagon sends the USS Mesa Verde to the Persian Gulf to join a contingency of U.S. Navy ships already stationed there to monitor the northern offensive.
- June 17 – 275 United States Military personnel are deployed to Iraq to provide extra protection for the American embassy in Baghdad.
- June 18 – 2014 Northern Iraq offensive
  - 40 Indians working for a Turkish construction company are abducted by militants in Mosul.
  - Islamic State in Iraq and the Levant militants lay siege to Iraq's largest oil refinery, located in Baiji.
- June 20 – US sends 300 military advisers to Iraq as battle rages in Baiji over the country's biggest oil refinery.
- June 21 – Islamic State of Iraq and the Levant captures the towns of al-Qa'im, Anah and Rawa in Western Iraq.
- June 22 – Islamic State in Iraq and the Levant capture the al-Walid (al-Tanf) border crossing with Syria and the Turaibil (Karameh) border crossing with Jordan.
- June 25 – The Prime Minister of Iraq Nouri al-Maliki calls for national unity as an Islamic State in Iraq and the Levant reaches Yathrib 87 kilometres (54 miles) north of Baghdad.
- June 26 – 2014 Northern Iraq offensive
  - The Prime Minister of Iraq Nouri al-Maliki confirms that the Syrian Air Force bombed Islamic State in Iraq and the Levant positions in Iraq earlier in the week.
  - Insurgents capture the town of Mansouriyat al-Jabal, containing four natural gas fields, which is about 110 km northeast of Baghdad.
  - Iraqi forces launch an airborne assault on rebel-held Tikrit with at least one helicopter crashing.
- June 27 – American human rights group Human Rights Watch claims that Islamic State of Iraq and the Levant executed at least 160 captives earlier this month in Tikrit.
- June 28 – 2014 Northern Iraq offensive
  - The Iraqi Army expels militants from the centre of the city of Tikrit amongst heavy fighting.
  - Islamist rebels including members of the Al-Qaeda affiliated Nusra Front challenge Islamic State in Iraq and the Levant's control of the town of Albu Kamal on the Syrian border on Saturday.
- June 29 – The Islamic State of Iraq and the Levant is renamed the Islamic State, with a caliphate being proclaimed and Abu Bakr al-Baghdadi being named caliph.

=== July ===
- July 3 – Saudi Arabia deploys 30,000 soldiers to its border with Iraq after Iraqi government forces withdrew from the area.
- July 5 – 46 Indian nurses held hostage by the ISIL for almost a month in Tikrit, arrive at Cochin airport, Kochi, India.
- July 7 – Sittings of the Council of Representatives of Iraq are postponed for five weeks as Islamic State of Iraq and the Levant forces kill an Iraqi Army general on the outskirts of Baghdad.
- July 9 – Iraqi security forces find the bodies of 53 men shot recently in Hamza south of Baghdad.
- July 11 – Kurdish MPs withdraw from the central government following a dispute with the Prime Minister Nouri al-Maliki with Kurdish forces taking over control of two northern oil fields at Bai Hassan and Kirkuk.
- July 12 – Iraqi Civil War (2014–2017)
  - Gunmen kill 29 people in an apartment building in East Baghdad, including twenty women.
  - Twin bombings in the city of Kirkuk kill at least 28 people.
- July 15 – Salim al-Jabouri is elected as speaker of the Iraqi parliament.
- July 19 – Three bombs explode in Baghdad killing at least fifteen people.
- July 21 – Ten people are killed in an Iraqi Air Force air strike on the rebel-held town of Hawija.
- July 22 – A suicide bombing in Baghdad kills at least 21 people.
- July 24 – Iraqi Civil War (2014–2017)
  - Gunmen attack a prisoner convoy north of Baghdad resulting in the death of 52 prisoners and eight Iraqi Army soldiers.
  - Twin car bombs kill at least 13 people in central Baghdad.
- July 29 – An Iraqi Army raid on jihadist targets in a town southwest of Baghdad kills at least 17 people.

=== August ===
- August 3 – The Islamic State seizes the Yazidi-dominated town of Sinjar. It also seized control of the Mosul Dam, which is Iraq's biggest dam, the Ain Zalah oil field, and two more towns.
- August 6 – Iraqi Civil War (2014–2017)
  - Fighters from the Islamic State of Iraq and Syria clash with Iraq's Kurdish minority in the north of the country.
  - Iraq government television reports that an Iraqi Air Force strike has killed 60 militants.
  - At least 51 people are killed in a series of car bombings in Baghdad.
- August 7 – 2014 Northern Iraq offensive
  - The Islamic State captures a range of cities inhabited primarily by Assyrians in Northern Iraq, notably Bakhdida, Bartella, Qaraqosh, Tel Keppe, Karamlish and Tel Isqof; thousands flee, while many Yazidis are caught in the newly captured city of Sinjar.
  - The President of the United States, Barack Obama, delivers a statement promising increased humanitarian and military assistance including air strikes.
- August 8 – Iraqi Civil War (2014–2017)
  - U.S. F/A-18 fighters bomb ISIL artillery units and a military convoy.
  - Iraqi airstrikes kill 45 Islamic State fighters and injure 60.
  - The United Nations says the persecution of the Yazidi by ISIL may be genocide.
- August 9 – Iraqi Kurdish security forces report they have opened a road to Sinjar, rescuing over 5,000 Yazidis besieged by the IS group.
- August 10 – Iraqi Civil War (2014–2017)
  - The President of Iraqi Kurdistan, Massoud Barzani, appeals for international military aid to help defeat Islamist militants.
  - The US launches a fourth round of air strikes targeting Islamic State fighters near Erbil, and Kurdish forces regain control of two towns in Nineveh Governorate after heavy fighting.
- August 11 – Iraq's embattled Prime Minister Nouri al-Maliki says that he will file a legal complaint against President Fuad Masum for opposing Maliki's reappointment.
- August 13 – The Syrian Observatory for Human Rights claims that 52 people have died as Islamic State of Iraq and the Levant Islamists gain control of eight villages between Aleppo and the Turkish border.
- August 14 – Iraqi Civil War (2014–2017)
  - The United Nations declares its highest state of emergency in Iraq following the advance of Islamic State of Iraq and the Levant.
  - Sunni militants and the Iraqi Army clash west of Baghdad, leaving 4 children dead.
  - President Obama announces that U.S airstrikes broke the IS siege of Mount Sinjar, allowing thousands of Yazidi refugees to escape, and declares plans for further airstrikes against IS forces.
- August 15 – Several influential Iraqis, including Grand Ayatollah Ali al-Sistani, Ali Hatem al-Suleiman, and a group of six leaders from Sunni provinces, state that they are willing to work with the new Prime Minister of Iraq, Haider Al-Abadi, if certain conditions are met.
- August 17 – Kurdish forces, supported by U.S. airstrikes, retake control of the Mosul Dam after its capture by IS militants.
- August 22 – A suicide bomber and multiple gunmen, suspected to be Shia militiamen, attack a Sunni mosque in the Diyala Governorate, killing at least 65 people.
- August 23 – Iraqi Civil War (2014–2017)
  - The UN calls for action to prevent what it suspects may become a massacre in the northern Iraqi town of Amirli, which has been besieged by IS forces since June.
  - At least 30 people are killed in bombings in Baghdad and Kirkuk.
- August 25 – A suicide bomber detonates his vest inside of a Shiite mosque in Baghdad, killing 13 people.
- August 26 – A car bomb explodes in a mainly Shi'ite section of Baghdad, killing at least eight people and wounding 20.
- August 29 – The United Kingdom raises its terror threat level from "substantial" to "severe" in response to conflicts in Iraq and Syria.
- August 31 – Iraqi security forces reach the town of Amerli which had been besieged by Islamic State of Iraq and the Levant forces.

=== September ===
- September 2 – The United States sends an additional 250 US troops to protect American personnel.
- September 7 – The United States launches new airstrikes on ISIS in western Iraq, in an effort to protect the Haditha Dam.
- September 10 – The President of the United States Barack Obama authorises $25 million for "immediate military assistance" to the Iraqi government and Kurdistan Regional Government. He also outlines plans to expand US operations against Islamic State in Iraq and the Levant to Syria in a televised address to the nation.
- September 12 – Australia raises its terror threat level to high following concerns about militants returning from conflicts in Iraq and Syria.
- September 13 – The Prime Minister of Iraq Haider al-Abadi says he has ordered the army to stop shelling areas held by the Islamic State where there are civilians present.
- September 26 – The Parliament of the United Kingdom approves air strikes against ISIS in Iraq by 524 votes to 43.

=== October ===
- October 7 – A hospital in the northern Iraqi city of Tal Afar says that 29 suspected ISIL fighters were killed in airstrikes last night.
- October 9 – A car bombing in a busy street in Baghdad's largest Shi'ite neighbourhood kills at least 12 people.
- October 12 – Islamic State claims responsibility for a triple suicide bombing in Diyala Governorate that killed 26 Kurds as well as an attack in Anbar Province that killed the head of security.
- October 13 – Three bombs explode in Shi'ite areas of Baghdad killing at least 30 people.
- October 20 – At least 43 Shi'ites are dead in Baghdad and the holy city of Karbala in a wave of suicide and car bombings.
- October 22 – A court convicts four former employees of Blackwater Worldwide on charges related to the 2007 killing of 14 unarmed Iraqis by firing machine guns in a Baghdad traffic circle.
- October 25 – Kurdish peshmergas retake the city of Zumar and several nearby villages from ISIS, while Iraqi government forces and Shi'ite militias seize control of Jurf Al Sakhar.

=== November ===
- November 2 – Over 300 members of the Sunni Albu Nimr tribe are executed by ISIL militants in Al Anbar Governorate.
- November 7 – United States President Barack Obama orders 1,500 more troops into Iraq.
- November 8 – Abu Bakr al-Baghdadi is critically wounded during a US airstrike at al-Qa'im.
- November 11 – A suicide bomber kills eight people in the centre of Baiji.
- November 12 – Suicide bombings kill at least 23 people across Iraq.
- November 14 – Iraqi forces expel ISIL from the refinery town of Baiji.
- November 19 – A car bomb targets a government building in the Iraqi Kurdish capital Erbil, resulting in four deaths.
- November 29 – Reuters reports that 17 people have been killed in Iraqi territory currently under the control of Islamic State.

=== December ===
- December 1 – Iraqi Civil War (2014–2017)
  - Prime Minister of Iraq Haidar al-Abadi promises a crackdown on corruption after an audit shows that there were 50,000 ghost soldiers in the Army.
  - The Iraq Prime Minister fires 24 Interior Ministry officials while the Islamic State kills at least 15 police officers near the border with Syria.
- December 2 – Reuters reveals, based on three anonymous sources, that a major Switzerland based commodities firm, Trafigura, played a "pivotal" role in the ability of the semi-autonomous Kurdish region of Iraq to export oil, exports that the central government in Baghdad has prohibited.
- December 4 – Bombings in Kirkuk and Shia Muslim sections of Baghdad kill at least 33 people.
- December 8 – The United Nations seeks $16.4 billion to fund humanitarian assistance programs in 2015 with Syria, Iraq, Sudan and South Sudan the areas of greatest need.
- December 10 – The Kurdish region's military forces, the Peshmerga Ministry, states that over 700 Iraqi Kurds have died fighting ISIL forces since June.
- December 13 – Iraqi officials claim that ISIL have shot down a military helicopter near Sarharra, killing both pilots.
- December 24 – A suicide bombing in Madaen among a group of pro-government Sunni militiamen kills at least 33 people and leaves 55 others wounded.
- December 25 – Iraqi Christians defy persecution and celebrate Christmas in Baghdad.
- December 30 – Iraqi government forces and allied Shia militia recapture the town of Dhuluiya, north of Baghdad, from the Islamic State of Iraq and the Levant.

=== Date Unknown ===
- Several Universities are established including: Samarra University, University of Fallujah, Ninevah University, And University of Information Technology and Communications.

== Deaths ==
- 8 April – Emmanuel III Delly, Chaldean Catholic Patriarch.(b.1927)
- 13 May – Nuri al-Rawi, painter.(1925)
- 24 May – Tariq Aziz Brisam, footballer.(1945)
- 20 August – Morteza Hosseini Fayaz, Ayatollah.(b.1928)
- 22 September – Samira Saleh Ali al-Naimi, human rights lawyer.
