= Al-Zubaydi =

Al-Zubaydi may refer to:

- Abu Bakr az-Zubaydi (died 989), Andalusi writer
- Mohammed Hamza Zubeidi (1938–2005), prime minister of Iraq
- Mahir al-Zubaydi (died 2008), al-Qaeda commander in Iraq
- Abu Nabil al-Anbari (died 2015), nom de guerre of Wissam Najm Abd Zayd al Zubaydi, Libyan ISIS leader
- Sadoun al-Zubaydi (fl. 1991– ), Iraqi English professor and translator
- Aydarus al-Zubaydi (born 1967), Yemeni politician
