= 2015 in Iraq =

- Decades: 1990s; 2000s; 2010s; 2020s
- See also: Other events of 2015; List of years in Iraq

The following lists events that happened in 2015 in Iraq.

== Incumbents ==
- President: Fuad Masum
- Prime Minister: Haider al-Abadi
- Vice President: Nouri al-Maliki, Usama al-Nujayfi, Ayad Allawi

== Events ==
=== January ===
- January 6 – Clashes with ISIL in Al Anbar Governorate kill twenty-three Iraqi Army soldiers and allied Sunni fighters.
- January 8 – A suicide bomber targets a police checkpoint in the town of Youssifiyah, killing seven people.
- January 25 – 21 Arab-Iraqi civilians were killed in the village of Kocho by Yazidi militias in retaliation for the Sinjar massacre.

=== February ===
- February 7 – Bombings in Baghdad kill at least 37 people hours before the city's curfew was due to end. ISIL claims responsibility.
- February 9 – Several attacks, including a suicide bombing, kill at least 22 in Baghdad, Iraq, in a predominantly Shiite part of the capital.
- February 26 – ISIL posts a video showing the destruction of Mosul Museum, the second largest in Iraq and rich in artifacts from thousands of years of Iraqi history.
- February 28 – A series of car bombs kill 19 people in Balad Ruz, east-central Iraq.

=== March ===
- March 2 – A coalition of Iraqi Armed Forces and militia numbering around 30,000 launches an offensive against Islamic State positions in Tikrit. Troops seize control of the district of al-Tin and al-Abeid.
- March 5 – Separate attacks in Baghdad kill at least eight people.
- March 7 – ISIL destroys the ancient city of Hatra following the destruction of Nimrud.

=== April ===
- April 8 – The Iraqi Ministry of Tourism reports that Bash Tapia Castle was destroyed by ISIL.

=== July ===
- July 17 – A car bomb in Khan Bani Saad killed 130 people injuring at least 130 more.
- July 31 – national protests

=== December ===
- 8 December – The Catholic University in Erbil is founded.
- 16 December – The 26 members of a Qatari hunting party are kidnapped from the Samawa desert near Iraqi-Saudi borders.

=== Scheduled ===
- The Iraqi Kurdistan presidential elections will take place.

== Deaths ==
- 4 February – Ziad Al-Karbouly, Islamic state leader.(b.1970)
- 12 March – Harith al-Dhari, Sunni cleric and tribe leader. (b.1941)
- 7 April – Mohammad Bahr al-Uloom, politician.(b.1927)
- 5 June – Tariq Aziz, politician.(b.1936)
- 13 August – Watban Ibrahim, politician.(b.1952)
- 26 September – Jamal al Barzinji, Iraqi-American businessman.(b.1939)
- 3 November – Ahmed Chalabi, politician.(b.1945)
