= 2016 in Iraq =

- Decades: 1990s; 2000s; 2010s; 2020s
- See also: Other events of 2016; List of years in Iraq

The following lists events that happened during 2016 in Iraq.

== Incumbents ==
- President: Fuad Masum
- Prime Minister: Haider al-Abadi
- Vice President: Nouri al-Maliki, Usama al-Nujayfi, Ayad Allawi

== Events ==
=== January ===
- 1 January –The Islamic State attacks and briefly seize an Iraqi army base in Al Tarah using suicide car bombers and fighters wearing explosive belts. The Iraqi army retook the base with the help of coalition airstrikes on the same day.
- 3 January – Camp Speicher, an Iraqi military base, is attacked by multiple ISIL suicide and car bombers on . At least 15 Iraqi military and police personnel are killed.
- 11 January – Baghdad–Miqdadiyah attacks, Two Islamic State militants set off a bomb outside Al-Jawhara mall in Baghdad, threw hand grenades at passersby, shot at people, and one then killed himself in a suicide bomb attack, killing nine people and injuring 13. Police shot and killed the other militant. In another attack that same day, the Islamic State killed 20 people in a café in Muqdadiya with an IED and a suicide bomb attack.

=== February ===
- 8 February – IS militants execute over 300 Iraqi soldiers and civilian men in Mosul.
- 18 February – Iraqi court convicts and sentences to death 40 defendants implicated in the Speicher massacre of 2014 in which up to 1,700 Iraqi military recruits were executed.
- 28 February – Two militants target a market in Sadr City district in Baghdad killing 70 people.
- 29 February –
  - Four IS militants blow themselves up near the Haditha dam, killing Iraqi Brigadier general Ali Abboud and injuring eight soldiers.
  - At least 40 killed in an explosion at a funeral in Muqdadiya, attended by commanders of Shia militias.
  - An explosion at a security checkpoint in Baghdad kills 8 security personnel.

=== March ===
- 6 March – A suicide bomber targets a security checkpoint near Hilla by driving an explosives laden car into the checkpoint, killing at least 60 people and wounding others.
- 19 March – An American serviceman is killed by a rocket attack on the Makhmour base near Mosul where he was stationed. No Iraqi casualties were reported.
- 25 March – At least 30 people are killed and 95 people are injured when a suicide bomber blew himself up at a football stadium in the town of Iskandariya in the Babel province.
- 26 March – IS suicide attacker storm the Ain al-Assad military base in Anbar and kill at least 18 Iraqi soldiers.

=== April ===
- 4 April –
  - A series of suicide bombings and attacks by IS militants kill around 70 and injures about a100 Iraqi security forces across the Anbar governorate.
  - At least 5 killed and 11 injured in a car explosion in center of Basra city.
- 27 April – Iraq closes Al Jazeera offices in Iraq and revokes the news network's broadcasting license after accusing it of violating broadcasting regulations.
- 30 April – After months of protests, supporters of Shiite cleric Muqtada al-Sadr breached the Green Zone in Baghdad and stormed the Iraqi Parliament.

=== May ===
- 11 May – At least 62 people die in a truck bombing in Bagdad.
- 13 May – IS militants carry out a massacre in cafe in Balad, killing at least 12 people. The cafe was frequented by Real Madrid fans, the club issued a statement of support to the victims.
- 15 May – Suicide bombers target the Taji gas factory north of Baghdad, killing 14 people and wounding another 20 people.
- 17 May – At least 70 dead and more than a 100 wounded in three separate explosions across Baghdad.

=== July ===
- July 3 – Several suicide car bombings are carried out in a local shopping district in Karrada, Baghdad, Iraq, killing at least 281 and injuring more than 200.

== Deaths ==
- 4 March – Taha Jabir Alalwani, Islamic scholar.(b.1933)
- 31 March – Zaha Hadid, Architect. (b.1950)
- 6 May – Abu Waheeb, Islamic state commander.(b.1986)
- 19 May – Amal Taha, actress.(b.1956)
- 26 October – Ali Hussein Shihab, footballer.(b.1961)
- 14 November – Hashim Al-Mosawy, politician.(b.1939)

== See also ==
- Terrorist incidents in Iraq in 2016
