= 2017 in Iraq =

- Decades: 1990s; 2000s; 2010s; 2020s
- See also: Other events of 2017; List of years in Iraq

Events in the year 2017 in Iraq.

== Incumbents ==
- President: Fuad Masum
- Prime Minister: Haider al-Abadi
- Vice President: Nouri al-Maliki, Usama al-Nujayfi, Ayad Allawi

== Events ==
=== January ===
- 2 January – a series of suicide car bombings took place in Sadr City and behind the Kindi and Imam Ali hospitals in Baghdad, killing 56 people and injuring more than 120.
- 13 January – Iraqi forces fighting the Islamic State militants manage to seize full control of Mosul University which the army described as a significant victory.

=== February ===
- 14- 16 February – A series of bombs on 3 consecutive days kills at least 48 people and injures over 50, all targeting Shi'ite majority areas in Baghdad.
- 25 February – Saudi Arabia's foreign affairs minister Adel al-Jubeir visits Iraq, marking the highest such diplomatic visit between the two countries since 1990.

=== March ===
- 5 March – Iraqi forces launch a new offensive against IS forces in western Mosul.
- 6 March – The al-Hurriya bridge, one of 5 vital bridges in Mosul is captured by Iraqi forces, providing a foothold for the retaking of the city.
- 8 March – Iraqi forces manage to retake Badoush prison in western Mosul, the site of the Badoush prison massacre.
- 27 March – the American-led coalition conducted a bombing of the al-Aghawat al-Jadidah neighborhood in Western Mosul that killed hundreds of civilians.

=== April ===
- 21 April – The 26 members of a Kidnapped Qatari hunting party are released from their captivity in Iraq that lasted 16 months.

=== May ===
- 12 May – The Iraqi Popular Mobilization forces launch a campaign to retake the Qayrawan and Al-Baaj districts west of Mosul city from IS control.
- 23 May – The Popular Mobilization forces announce the retaking of Qayrawan.
- 30 May – Al-Faqma ice cream parlor bombing by IS kills over 30 people at an ice cream parlor in Baghdad.

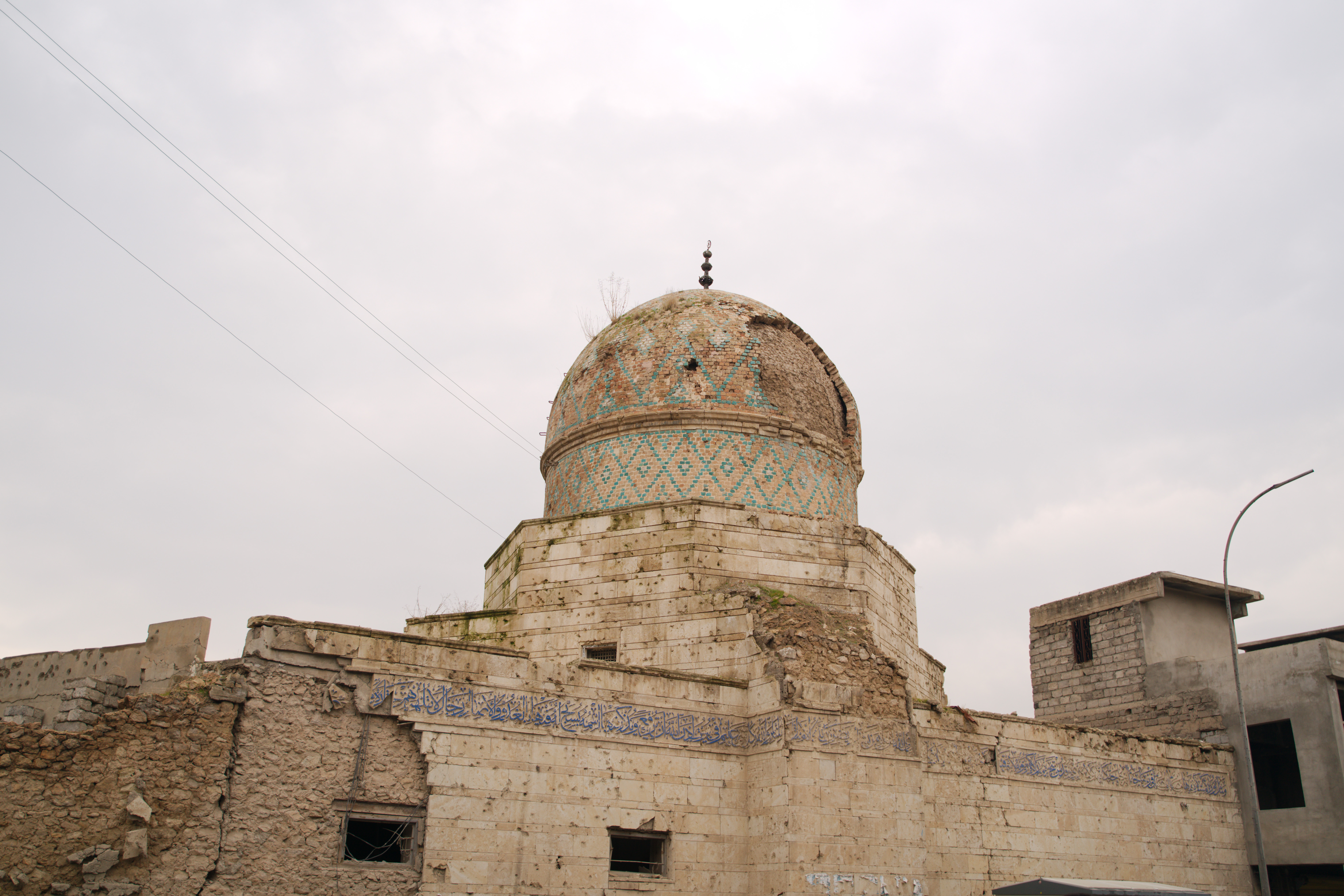
Great Mosque of al-Nuri (2020)

=== June ===
- 4 June – The Popular Mobilization forces announce the retaking of Al-Baaj.
- 19 June – A mine explosion in Mosul kills one Iraqi journalist and 2 French journalists and injures others.
- 21 June – The Great Mosque of al-Nuri in Mosul was destroyed during battle by IS militants.

=== July ===
- 2 July – A suicide bomber targets a displacement camp in Anbar, killing 14 people.
- 10 July – Iraqi prime minister Al-Abadi announces victory over IS forces and reclaiming the city of Mosul after 9 months of intensive fighting.

=== August ===
- 15 August – Iraqi forces announce the beginning of combat operation against IS stronghold in Tal Afar.
- 31 August – The Iraqi government announces the retaking of Tal Afar and the entire Nineveh governorate from IS control.

=== September ===
- 14 September – At least 60 people are killed and dozens injured in two attacks in the Thi Qar province near Nasiriyah city. In the first attack unidentified gunmen opened fire in a restaurant on the highway. The next attack occurred shortly after, when a car exploded at a security checkpoint near the same area.
- 29 September – Iraqi government official threat to Kurdish to close a border in Northern Iraq follow vote for independence referendum.

== Deaths ==
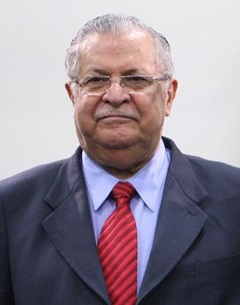
Jalal Talabani

- 19 May – Nawshirwan Mustafa, politician. (b.1944)
- 19 June –
  - Bakhtiyar Haddad, Iraqi journalist.
  - Stephan Villeneuve, French journalist, killed in Mosul.
- 24 June – Véronique Robert, French journalist, died of injuries sustained in an explosion in Mosul.
- 10 July – Mohsen Ajil al-Yawar, head of the Shammar tribe and uncle of prime minister Ghazi Mashal al-Yawer.
- 3 October – Jalal Talabani, politician, former president (b.1933)

== See also ==
- Timeline of ISIL-related events (2017)
