= Safah Abdul Hameed =

Iraqi journalist and television presenter

Safah Abdul Hameed (died September 8, 2010) was an Iraqi journalist and television presenter for the al-Mosuliyah satellite television station. Hameed was shot and killed by gunmen outside of his home in Mosul, Iraq, on September 8, 2010. He was survived by six children.

Hameed's murder was the second killing of an Iraqi television presenter in just two days. On September 7, 2010, prominent Iraqi presenter Riad al-Saray of Al Iraqiya was shot and killed while driving from his home in Baghdad to Karbala. Hameed was also assassinated just one day after Reporters Without Borders declared the Iraq War as the deadliest conflict for members of the media since World War II. 230 members of the media, including 172 journalists, have been killed in Iraq since 2003, as of September 2010.
