= Sherif Kamal Shahine =

Egyptian diplomat

Sherif Kamal Shahine is an Egyptian diplomat. Formerly the ambassador to Zambia, Shahine became his country's ambassador to Iraq on 22 June 2009. Shahine is the first Egyptian ambassador to Iraq since former ambassador Ihab al-Sharif was kidnapped and killed in July 2005.
