= 2013 in Iraq =

- Decades: 1990s; 2000s; 2010s; 2020s
- See also: Other events of 2013; List of years in Iraq

The following lists events the happened in 2013 in Iraq.

== Incumbents ==
- President: Jalal Talabani
- Prime Minister: Nouri al-Maliki
- Vice President: Khodair al-Khozaei

== Events ==
- 2012–2013 Iraqi protests

=== January ===
- 3 January – A suicide bombing in Mussayab kills 27 Shiite pilgrims and injures 60 others.
- 15 January – A suicide bomber kills a Sunni MP and six others in Fallujah, two days after Finance Minister Rafi al-Issawi survived an assassination attempt in the same city. The parliamentarian, Ifan Saadoun al-Issawi, was an important member of the Sahwa committee in Fallujah and part of the opposition to Prime Minister Nouri al-Maliki.
- 17 January – Iraqi insurgency (post-U.S. withdrawal)
  - Two car bombs explode in the city of Dujail, leaving at least 7 dead and 25 wounded.
  - A bomb detonated on a bus carrying pilgrims in Iraq. In a separate incident a roadside bomb detonated and injures two pilgrims walking to Hussein ibn Ali. Another bomb detonated at a bus stop killing 7 people and wounding 28. Also a civilian vehicle was hit by a roadside bomb leaving 2 dead. In total 33 people were killed in one of the most violent days this month.
- 22 January – Car bombings in Baghdad kill at least 17 people and injure dozens of others.
- 23 January – A suicide bombing at a mosque in Tuz Khormato kills at least 23 people.
- 25 January – Ongoing protests by Sunni Muslims in Iraq against the government of Prime Minister Nouri al-Maliki turn deadly, as clashes leave 7 protesters and 2 soldiers dead in Fallujah. More than 60 others are injured, and at least 3 soldiers are kidnapped by unidentified gunmen.

=== February ===
- 3 February – At least 33 people are killed in Kirkuk, when a suicide bomber detonates a truck packed with explosives outside a police headquarters and gunmen disguised as officers tried to storm the compound.
- 4 February – A suicide bomber attacks a government building in Taji, 15 kilometres north of the capital Baghdad, killing 22 and injuring 44 others. Nineteen of the dead are members of the Sahwa militia opposed to al-Qaeda in Iraq, who were waiting for their monthly salaries.
- 8 February – A string of bombings kill at least 29 people and injure 69 others in central Iraq, including twin blasts in Baghdad's Kadhimiya neighborhood, as well as the city of Hilla.
- 9 February – A rocket kills six people and injures over 50 others at Camp Liberty, an Iraqi facility near Baghdad that shelters members of People's Mujahedin of Iran.
- 16 February – A suicide bombing kills General Ali Aouni, the head of the Iraqi intelligence academy, and three of his bodyguards in Tal Afar.
- 17 February – A series of car bombs kill at least 37 people and injure more than 130 others in mostly Shiite areas of the capital Baghdad.
- 28 February – At least 23 people are killed and 60 others injured in a series of bombings in Shiite districts of Baghdad and surrounding suburbs.
- 28 February – At least eight people are killed and several are missing after a restaurant boat sinks in the Tigris, in central Baghdad.

=== March ===
- 4 March – At least 40 Syrian soldiers are killed in ambush in Western Iraq.
- 11 March – The insurgent group Islamic State of Iraq claims responsibility for ambushing a convoy of Syrian Army soldiers on March 4.
- 14 March – A string of coordinated car bombs and suicide bombers strike central Baghdad, followed by a militant attack on the Justice Ministry building. At least 25 people are killed, including 7 police officers and 3 militants, along with 50 wounded.
- 17 March – A car bombing near a bus station in Garmat Ali near Basra kills at least 10 people.
- 19 March – A series of bombings and shootings kills at least 98 people and injures 240 others across Iraq.
- 24 March – US Secretary of State John Kerry arrives in Iraq on an unannounced visit to press for greater co-operation over the conflict in Syria.
- 26 March – A roadside bombing kills the head of a local town council and a member of a provincial council in Tuz Khurmatu, Saladin Governorate.
- 29 March – Coordinated car bombings against five Shiite mosques in Baghdad and Kirkuk kill 23 worshipers.

=== April ===
- 1 April – A suicide attacker blows up a tanker lorry at the police headquarters in Tikrit, killing at least nine people. Three people are killed in a separate shooting in Baghdad.
- 6 April – At least 22 people are killed and more than 60 others injured when a suicide bomber blows himself up in a busy election campaign tent in Baquba.
- 12 April – At least 11 people are killed and more than 30 are wounded in bomb attacks at Sunni mosques in Baghdad and in the province of Diyala.
- 15 April – At least 33 people are killed and more than 160 others are wounded during a wave of bombings in Kirkuk, Baqubah, Tikrit, Fallujah, Nassiriyah, Mussayab and Baghdad.
- 18 April – Iraqi insurgency (post-U.S. withdrawal)
  - At least 27 people, including two children, are killed and 65 injured in a bomb attack on a cafe in Baghdad.
  - At least five people are killed in separate incidents in Iraq including a suspected al-Qaeda leader in Mosul.
- 23 April – 2013 Hawija clashes
  - At least 28 are dead and more than 70 are injured as violence breaks out in Hawija, between police forces and Sunni Muslim activists.
  - Two roadside bombs detonate outside a Sunni mosque killing at least 4 people and wounding 13 in Dora, Baghdad.
- 23 April – British businessman James McCormick is convicted at the Old Bailey on three counts of fraud after selling fake bomb detectors based on a device for finding golf balls to countries including Iraq and Georgia.
- 27 April – The Free Syrian Army accuses the government of Iraq of conducting an airstrike against its forces in Deir ez-Zor, a town in eastern Syria.
- 27 April – The death toll of the recent spate of anti-government violence in Iraq surpasses 190 as protests against the leadership of Nouri al-Maliki continue.
- 29 April – The government of Iraq shuts down 10 television stations including Al Jazeera, accusing them of encouraging the sectarian violence by Sunni Muslims in the country.

=== May ===
- 1 May – Multiple bomb attacks across Iraq kill at least 15 people.
- 2 May – At least 14 members of the Sons of Iraq are killed in two separate attacks within Fallujah.
- 6 May – At least 10 people are killed and 26 others injured in attacks across Iraq.
- 15 May – Iraqi insurgency (post-U.S. withdrawal)
  - Gunmen using silenced weapons attack at least nine alcohol stores in western Baghdad, killing twelve people.
  - Thirty-five people, including three police officers, are killed in bomb attacks in Shi'ite sections of Baghdad and parts of northern Iraq.
- 16 May – Seventeen people are killed when car bombs detonate and gunman attack people in Baghdad.
- 17 May – A string of bombings, most of them in Sunni areas of Iraq, kill at least 90 people and injured more than 200 others.
- 18 May – Gunmen break into the home of an anti-terrorism police officer in the Baghdad suburbs, killing him and his family.
- 20 May – A wave of violence continues, with attacks across the country killing 133 and leaving 283 others injured. Almost 400 people have been killed in the last six days alone, as tribal leaders warn of impending civil war.
- 25 May – A bomb explodes near a bus north of Baghdad, killing six Iranians, one Iraqi, and wounding fourteen people.
- 30 May – A series of bombings across Iraq kills at least eleven people.

=== June ===
- 1 June – Iraqi insurgency (post-U.S. withdrawal)
  - Authorities in Iraq say they have uncovered an Al-Qaeda plot to use chemical weapons, as well as to smuggle them to Europe and North America.
  - UN death-toll figures show more than 1000 people died from violent attacks in Iraq during the month of May, making it the country's deadliest month since 2008.
- 5 June – Fourteen people are killed at a fake security checkpoint manned by gunmen in western Iraq.
- 6 June – Gunmen ambush a bus in Al Anbar Governorate, killing 10 border police and 5 civilians.
- 7 June – At least 19 people are killed when two suicide bombers drive cars packed with explosives into targets in the Baghdad area.
- 10 June – Bombs explode across Iraq, killing at least 70 people and wounding many more, following a month of attacks bloodier than any the country has experienced since June 2008.
- 15 June – A mortar attack on an Iranian dissident camp in Iraq kills 2 people and wounds 27 others.
- 16 June – A series of car bombings by insurgents across central and southern Iraq kill at least twenty people.
- 18 June – Twin suicide bombings kill 31 and wound another 60 in al-Qahira, Baghdad.
- 28 June – Fifteen people are killed in attacks targeting Iraqi police and anti-Al-Qaeda militiamen.

=== July ===
In July 2013 alone, 700 people were killed in militant attacks in Iraq:

- 2 July – A wave of market bomb attacks mostly targeting Shi'ite Muslims kills 46 people.
- 5 July – 15 people die in a suicide bomb attack targeting a Shia mosque in Baghdad.
- 11 July – Bomb and gun attacks across Iraq kill more than 30 people including members of the Iraqi security forces.
- 14 July – Unknown attackers kill six people in and near the city of Mosul.
- 17 July – A bomb detonates inside a teahouse in Mosul, killing at least 10 people.
- 19 July – A suicide bombing inside a Sunni mosque in the province of Diyala kills at least twenty people.
- 21 July – Hundreds of al-Qaeda prisoners escape during armed raids on two Iraqi prisons.
- 22 July – At least 37 people are killed in Iraq amid a two-day spate of suicide bombings and armed prison escapes.
- 28 July – A suicide bombing in Tuz Khormato kills at least eight policemen.
- 29 July – A wave of twelve car bombs targeting Shiite communities in Iraq kills at least 44 people.

=== August ===
- 3 August – At least eight people have been killed in violence across Iraq.
- 6 August – 25 people are killed and 60 are wounded by car bombs near markets in Baghdad.
- 10 August – A bomb kills four people and wounds 16 in a park south of Baghdad.
- 12 August – Eight people are killed and 25 are injured in a suicide bomb attack on a cafe in Balad north of Baghdad.
- 14 August – Two roadside bombs explode in Baqubah killing 14 and wounding 26 people.
- 22 August – Fourteen people are killed by a suicide bomber in a military headquarters in Western Iraq.
- 23 August – 26 people are killed and 55 wounded by a suicide bomber in a park in northern Baghdad.
- 25 August – A wave of bomb attacks kill 41 people.
- 26 August – Newly declassified CIA documents show that top officials in the Reagan administration agreed to give Iraq information on the location of Iranian troops during the Iran–Iraq War despite awareness of Saddam Hussein's intention to use chemical weapons.
- 26 August – The Supreme Court of Iraq overturns term limits for senior governmental positions, allowing Iraqi Prime Minister Nouri al-Maliki to seek a third term in 2014.
- 28 August – At least 51 people are killed and dozens wounded in a series of bombings and attacks in and around Baghdad.

=== September ===
- 10 September – Bomb attacks targeting both Shi'ite Muslims and Sunnis kill at least 16 people.
- 13 September – A bomb in a Baghdad Sunni mosque kills at least 30 people.
- 15 September – Bombings in Baghdad and Shia provinces kill at least 21 people.
- 21 September – Over 100 people are killed in a series of attacks across Iraq, most of them in a twin suicide bombing at a Shiite funeral in Baghdad's Sadr City neighborhood.
- 27 September – Bombs targeting two Sunni mosques in Baghdad, kill seven people.
- 30 September – Fourteen car bombs targeting Shi'ite neighborhoods in Baghdad leave 54 people dead.

=== October ===
- 2 October – Gunmen shoot down a military helicopter in northern Iraq killing all four crew members.
- 6 October – Two car bombs detonate in a village near Tal Afar, killing and wounding dozens of people.
- 10 October – The Justice Ministry of Iraq announces it has executed 42 terrorism convicts in two days amidst condemnation from human rights groups.
- 15 October – A bomb detonates outside a Sunni mosque in Kirkuk, killing 12 worshipers and injuring another 24.
- 17 October – Attacks on Shia Muslims killed at least 59 people across Iraq, including a suicide truck bomb targeting at least 15 members of the country's Shabak people.
- 20 October – Iraqi insurgency (post-U.S. withdrawal)
  - Suicide bombers targeting police and local officials in Rawa, northwest of Baghdad, kill 15 people.
  - At least 37 people are killed in a suicide bombing at a cafe in the Shia-dominated area of Baghdad.
- 22 October – Militants kill 22 security forces in police and military checkpoints in Anbar Province.
- 27 October – A series of car bombings around Baghdad, kills at least 38 people.
- 30 October – Twenty people are killed in bombings.

=== November ===
- 6 November – A suicide bomber detonates a bomb in an oil tanker truck, killing 15 people in Baghdad.
- 13 November – Bombs across Iraq detonate, killing 18 people.
- 14 November – 39 people are killed in Iraq in attacks against Shiites Muslims.
- 16 November – A series of attacks in Baghdad and north Iraq kills four policemen and wounds dozens.
- 21 November – A truck bomb detonates in a vegetable market in northeastern Iraq, killing at least 31 people.
- 22 November – 23 people are killed in bombing and shootings.
- 23 November – A car bomb and a suicide bomber kills nine people and wounds 54.
- 25 November – Two bombs exploded outside a cafe in Baghdad in the district of Sadriya, home to mainly Shiite Muslims, killing at least 17 and wounding 37.
- 27 November – 33 people are killed in bombings and shootings across Iraq.
- 29 November – A wave of violence in Iraq kills 52 people, most of whom were kidnapped and then shot dead.

=== December ===
- 1 December – A suicide bombing at a funeral killed at least 17 people in Baqubah.
- 4 December – Iraqi security forces stormed the Jawahir Mall in Kirkuk after armed gunmen seize hostages.
- 5 December – Militants in Kirkuk attacked a mall and police headquarters, killing 10 people and injuring another 70.
- 8 December – At least 30 people are killed as a result of car bombings.
- 9 December – Attacks around Iraq killed at least 18 people, including a car bombing at a cafe in the town of Buhriz which killed 12 people.
- 9 December – Iraqi Jewish artifacts that were rescued from Saddam Hussein's palace by a Jewish-American scholar and brought to the United States were scheduled to be returned to Iraq by the end of the summer in 2014, despite objections from American Jews citing instability in Iraq.
- 13 December – 15 Iranians and 3 Iraqis were killed in a pipeline attack in the north-east of Baghdad.
- 19 December – A series of attacks across Iraq killed 22 Shiite pilgrims.
- 20 December – Two roadside bombings in Iraq killed 11 people while more bombings and shootings across northern Iraq killed 14 people.
- 21 December – Eighteen Iraqi military officers and soldiers were killed and more than 30 others injured after an attack in Rutbah, in Iraq's western Anbar province. Among those killed is the commander of the elite Iraqi 7th Division Major General Mohammed al-Karawi, as well as 4 other officers.
- 23 December – Iraqi insurgency (post-U.S. withdrawal)
  - A mortar attack killed four Iraq army officers and two soldiers in an army base west of Baghdad.
  - A terrorist attack on a news complex in Tikrit, killed 5 people.
- 25 December – Three bombs targeting Christians in Baghdad killed at least 38 people and wounded 70 others.
- 29 December – 18 people were killed in attacks across Iraq, including a military general in a bombing in the northern city of Mosul.
- 30 December – 10 people were killed in violence as Iraqi security forces dismantled an anti-government protest camp in the western city of Ramadi.
- 31 December - ISIS launches an operation to capture the city of Fallujah, resulting in the escalation of the insurgency to a full-scale war.
