= 2011 in Iraq =

- Decades: 1990s; 2000s; 2010s; 2020s
- See also: Other events of 2011; List of years in Iraq

Events in the year 2011 in Iraq.

== Incumbents ==
- President: Jalal Talabani
- Prime Minister: Nouri al-Maliki
- Vice President: Khodair al-Khozaei (starting 13 May), Tariq al-Hashimi, Adil Abdul-Mahdi (until 11 July)
- Iraqi Kurdistan Regional Government (autonomous region)
  - President: Massoud Barzani
  - Prime Minister: Barham Salih

== Events ==
- 2011 Iraqi protests
- 2011 Kurdish protests in Iraq
- 2011 Withdrawal of United States troops from Iraq

=== January ===
- January 8 – Iraqi Shia Muslim leader Muqtada al-Sadr urges a rejection of violence and peaceful resistance against the country's "occupiers" in his first public address since his return from exile.
- January 9 – Demonstrators gather outside the Iranian Embassy in London to protest against an attack on Iranian exiles in Iraq, an attack reportedly ordered by Iraqi Prime Minister Nouri al-Maliki.
- January 15 – An Iraqi soldier opens fire on U.S. troops at a training centre, killing two and injuring another before being killed himself.
- January 19 – A suicide bomber driving an ambulance kills at least 12 people and injures another 50 in Iraq's Diyala Governorate.
- January 20 – Iraq Inquiry documents show former British prime minister Tony Blair was offered an alternative to attacking Iraq during a secret meeting held eight days before its soldiers invaded the country in 2003.
- January 21 – A private note, due to remain secret despite calls for it to be published by the chairman of the Iraq Inquiry, shows former British prime minister Tony Blair privately assured former American president George W. Bush "you can count on us" before they jointly invaded Iraq prior to the Iraq War.
- January 24 – A series of bombings in Baghdad and Karbala kill at least 33 people less than a week after similar attacks claimed the lives of 133 others.

=== April ===
- April 8 – In the Camp Ashraf massacre, an Iraqi Army raid against a group of Iranian exiles at Camp Ashraf left 34 civilians dead and 318 injured.

=== May ===
- May 3 – A car bomb went off in the Dora district in Baghdad killing at least 9 and injuring more than 27.
- May 5 – At least 26 people killed and 60 wounded in a car bombing against a police compound in the city of Hilla.
- May 5 – An attack on Camp Taji using 52 35 mm mortars, no deaths, 3 minor injuries, and multiple damaged aircraft.
- May 29 – An Iraqi soldier and a firefighter were killed and 11 other people were wounded in two bomb explosions in Abu Ghraib.

=== June ===
- June 21 – 20 people are killed and 30+ wounded when a bombs detonates in the city of Al Diwaniyah.

=== December ===
- December 15 – U.S. Flag lowered in Baghdad, marking the official end of the military involvement in the country.
- December 18 – War officially ended.

== Notable deaths ==
- March 11 — Donny George Youkhanna (born 1950), archeologist
- September 12 — Mohammed Ghani Hikmat (born 1929), sculptor
