= Mohammad Shafar =

Iraqi militia leader (died 2012)

Mohammad Shafar (died March 5, 2012) was a leader of the Awakening movement in and around Haditha, Iraq.

This was a group of Sunni Arab militias who had allied themselves with the American-backed Iraqi government. Shafar was killed by ISI gunmen on March, 5th, 2012 in an attack on Haditha that left at least 20 people dead.

== Sources ==
- Jack Healy. "Gunmen in Uniforms Kill 20 Police Officers in Iraq", New York Times, March 6, 2012, p. A8.
