= Kazim al-Samawi =

Iraqi poet and journalist (1925–2010)

- كاظم السماوي
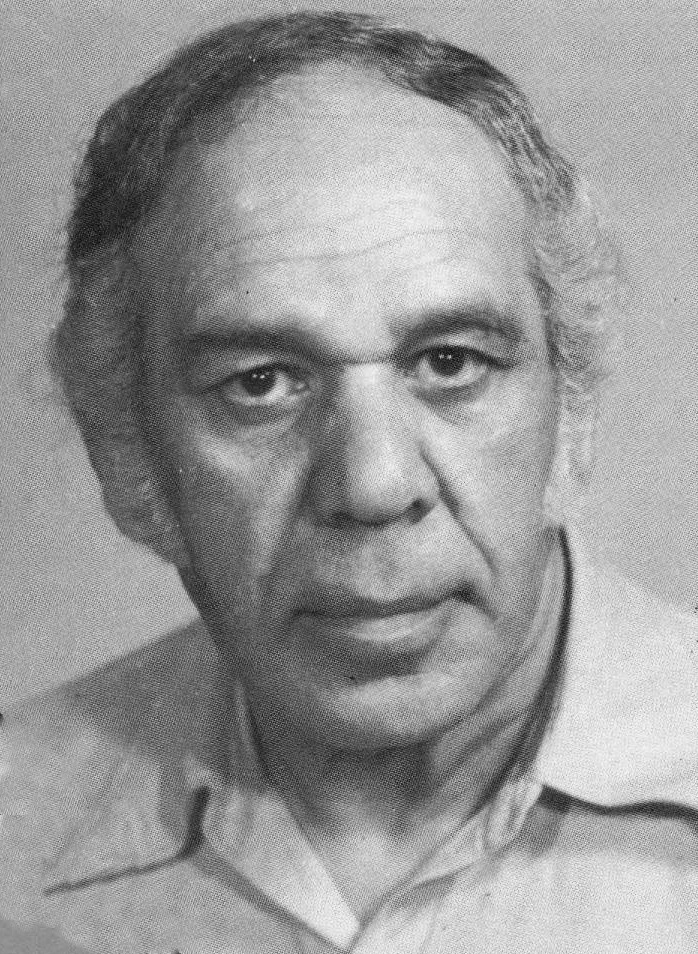
- Al-Samawi, 1970s
- Born: Kazim Jasir Faraj; 1925; Samawah, Mandatory Iraq
- Died: 15 March 2010 (aged 85); Stockholm, Sweden
- Resting place: Saiwan Cemetery, Sulaymaniyah
- Citizenship: Kingdom of Iraq (1925–1954); Iraqi Republic (1958–1968)
- Occupations: Poet; journalist; writer
- Writing career
- Language: Arabic

Kazim Jasir Faraj (Arabic: كاظم السماوي, romanized: Kāẓim al-Samāwī; 1925 – 15 March 2010), better known as Kazim al-Samawi, was an Iraqi poet and journalist known for his humanist worldview. From the 1950s, he spent more than half of his life in exile as a political refuge and was known by title "The Elder of the Iraqi exiles" or "The Shaykh of Exiles". He moved between many countries, such as Lebanon, Hungary, Germany, China, Syria and Cyprus until he finally settled in Sweden. Al-Samawi published his first poetry collection in 1950 and was as a result was persecuted by the Nuri al-Said government. Later, he and his family faced persecution in Ba'athist Iraq, and he experienced the death of almost all his family members, often in quick succession. Through his poetry in various forms, genres and metres, he was very involved in general human affairs. His family name is derived from his hometown demonym, Samawah. He studied in Baghdad and graduated from the Rural Teachers’ House in 1940, continued his higher studies in Hungary and graduated from the Faculty of Arts in 1956. He worked for a while in journalism in Baghdad with a progressive tendency, founded The Humanity in 1956, a twice-weekly leftist newspaper. He left about seven poetry collections that have been translated into several languages. Al-Samawi died at the age of 85 in Stockholm and was buried in Sulaymaniyah.

== Biography ==
=== Early years ===
Kazim Jasir Faraj was born to Iraqi parents in the city of Samawah, his laqab, al-Samawi being derived from his birthplace. His exact birthyear is disputed. According to his own statement, he was born in 1925, whereas other sources claim 1919. Very little is known about his early years, except that he went to Baghdad to complete his education, and graduated from the Rural Teachers’ House in 1940. He began his literary career in the late 1940s with two bayts in classical Arabic poetry genre. He rose to prominence as a left-wing realist poet and committed journalist in the next two decades.

=== Middle years ===
He began his life in exile in the 1950s. While he was in Lebanon, the Iraqi government at the time, headed by Nuri al-Said, issued a decision to revoke his Iraqi citizenship in 1954, and as a result of this decision he moved to Hungary as a denaturalized citizen, with the help of its government. He stayed in Budapest for several years. After learning the Hungarian language, he became a member of the Hungarian Writers' Union. He continued writing poetry there, and some of his 1950s poems were translated into Hungarian, and were published in 1956 in a book titled Éji vándor. After 14 July Revolution, he returned to Iraq and his Iraqi citizenship was restored to him. In 1959, he was appointed director general of the Radio and Television Organization in the first Iraqi Republic. After three years, he resigned in protest against some practices that he saw as inconsistent with the goals of the revolution and was imprisoned for several months. He remained loyal, however, to the principles of the revolution and its leader, Abd al-Karim Qasim, who asked him to be an ambassador to Hungary. Al-Samawi refused, preferring to stay in Iraq and work in independent journalism. In 1959, al-Samawi published the newspaper Al-Insaniyah (Arabic: الإنسانية, romanized: Al-Insānīyah, lit. 'The Humanity'), but it was closed down in 1961. Al-Samawi criticized a statement made by Qasim, when he gave a speech in an organization in which he was renouncing the Kurdish nation as a separated people of Arab descent.Al-Insaniyah published an editorial in response to the speech entitled "Kurdish nationalism is not a soluble bullet."

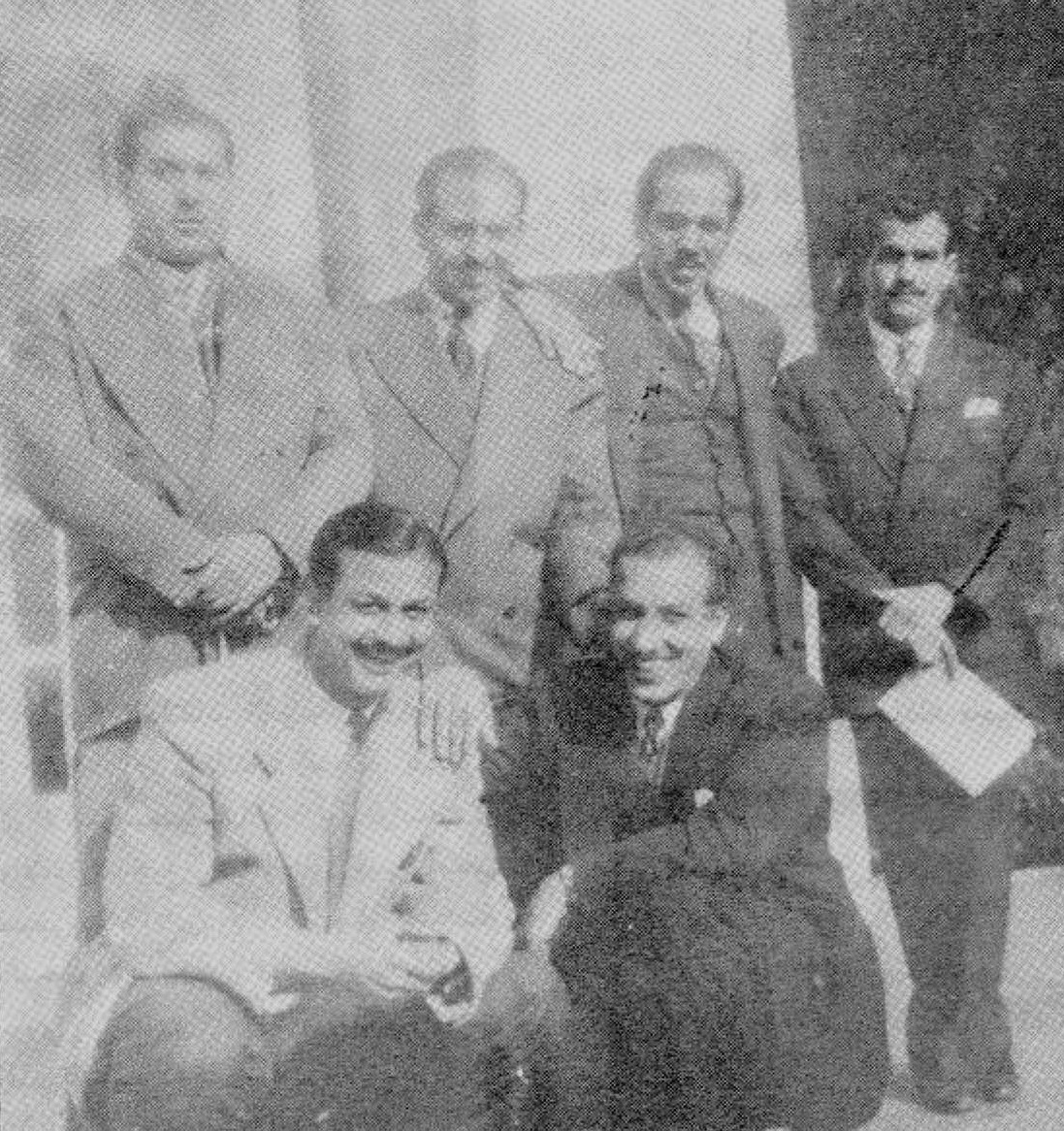
Kazim al-Samawi with his colleagues in Baghdad (bottom right), early 1960s.

Following his denaturalization in 1954, his journey began to live in exile for many years and decades, which gained him, despite hardships, new acquaintances. Exile life gave him a new vision and culture that made him to see “what he did not see in his country or what he did not find in books,” as he put it. His life in exile was divided among seven countries. He sought political asylum in Hungary from 1954 to 1958. After the 8 February 1963 coup d'état in Iraq and the Ba'athist coming to power, he was arrested again. After his release, al-Samawi left Iraq in 1964 to East Germany, and did not return home until 1973. But his stay did not last long when the Ba'athists began suppressing the leftist and democratic forces. He left Ba'athist Iraq for China in 1977, stayed there until 1980 when he returned to Beirut, he lived there for two years until 1982. He lived in Lattakia in Syria from 1982 to 1984, then he left Ba'athist Syria for Cyprus in 1984-1993, to return to Syria again in 1993-1996, and in the summer of 1996 he moved to Sweden as refugee. He had witnessed the death of nearly all his family members, from his parents to his two sons, one daughter, and wife. His son Nasir was assassinated on 20 November 1991 in Beijing, where he was studying, and his wife died shortly after Nasir. His other son, Riyad was kidnapped in Baghdad, after he returned from Germany, and he was a soldier in the Iran-Iraq war and died years later with cancer. In mid-2008, his daughter, Tahrir, died in London.

Al-Samawi was involved in the World Peace movement, and contributed to the establishment of the peace movement in Iraq in 1952, which he represented in many international conferences. He participated in the Asia and Pacific Rim Peace Conference in Beijing in 1952 as the representative of the Arab world. He was also member of the Poetry Society of the Arab Writers Union in Syria.

=== Final years and death ===
In 1994, a collection of his poetry from 1950 to 1993 was published in Beirut. An Iraqi writer, Talib Abd al-Amir, used to meet him on more than one occasion in Sweden, and interviewed him twice, about his poetry, journalism and political career. Their last meeting was in Kungsträdgården, Stockholm. Vivianne Slioa, an Iraqi poet who became a refugee in Sweden in 1991, described al-Samawi in an interview in June 2020 as "my friend and my father's friend", saying: "We met almost every day in Stockholm and he always told me about poetry and about the murder of his martyred son, whom he remembered every moment... he was my permanent friend and the closest person to me after my mother and father. I used to talk to him about my life and he was telling me about his life... I was influenced by him and Abd al-Karim Kasid." From early 1990s, he was also in contact with Vivianne Slioa's relative, Salim Bolus Slioa. Samawi assured him that he was a campaigner of revolutionary communist ideas against revisionism.

Al-Samawi spent the last decade of his life in a one-room elderly care apartment in Skärholmen. He did not suffer from any personal or service problems, but complained of loneliness and alienation from his friends while abroad. Al-Samawi died on 15 March 2010 in his last exile, Stockholm, the capital of Sweden. Upon his death in Stockholm, President Jalal Talabani ordered the transfer of his body to Iraq by a private plane to be buried in Sulaymaniyah, since he was one of the advocates of the Iraqi Kurdish nationalism. His funeral took place in the city of Sulaymaniyah on 25 March. As per his wishes, he was buried in the city's Saiwan Cemetery.

== Works ==
Poetry collections:

- Arabic: أغاني القافلة, romanized: Aġānī al-qāfila, 1950
- Arabic: الحرب والسلم, romanized: al-Ḥarb wa-l-salām, 1953
- Arabic: إلى الأمام أبدًا, romanized: Ilá al-Amām..abadan, 1954
- Arabic: رياح هانوي, romanized: Riyāḥ Hānūy, 1973
- Arabic: إلى اللقاء، في منفى آخر, romanized: Ilá al-liqāʼ fī manfá ākhar, 1980
- Arabic: قصائد للرصاص، قصائد للمطر, romanized: Qaṣāʼid lil-raṣā.̣ qaṣāʼid lil-maṭar, 1984
- Arabic: فصول الريح ورحيل الغريب, romanized: Fuṣūl al-rīḥ -- wa-raḥīl al-gharīb, 1993

Other works :

- Arabic: الفجر الأحمر فوق هنغاريا, 1954
- Arabic: حوار حول ماوتسي تونغ, 1990
