= National Foundation Congress =

The Iraqi National Foundation Congress (INFC) is a civil society movement in Iraq. It was set up following the 2003 invasion of Iraq to offer a peaceful protest to the ongoing occupation of the country and press for a united Iraq, and explicitly eschews violence in its methodology.

== Foundation and leadership ==
The congress was founded Saturday, 8 May 2004 by Sheikh Jawad al-Khalisi. A Shia, Al-Khalisi is the Imam of Al-Khadhimiya mosque in northern Baghdad. The group's spokesperson is Dr. Wamidh Nadhmi, a senior political scientist at Baghdad University.

The membership of the congress is diverse, including woman's rights groups, religious groups and nationalists. They include Nasserites, leftists and Ba'athists from the era before Saddam, as well as Kurds, Christians, representatives of the powerful Sunni movement the Association of Muslim Scholars, which has close links with Falluja and other strongly anti-American cities, and Sheikh Khalisi's own Shia friends and colleagues.

=== Political views ===
Whilst favouring elections, the INFC boycotted popular polls held in Iraq in 2005, stating that it would be wrong to participate whilst 'under occupation' and whilst crimes are being committed against the Iraqi people, "especially the savage massacres in Falluja". As a result of this the group itself has yet to achieve any democratic legitimacy at the ballot box. Their attitude is summed up by the closing statement of their 2005 congressional session:

Long live free and independent Iraq, with sovereignty intact. Long live inclusive, resolute Iraqi unity.

The group actively attempts to move beyond the sectarianism that is rife in Iraqi society post-invasion, expressed through their re-adoption of communal prayer across religious groups. The 2005 congressional session also states the commitment to 'Arab-Kurdish brotherhood', and that "it upholds the unity of Iraq as a people and territory, and its Islamic-Arabic identity in cultural non-ethnic terms". Commenting to Al-jazeera on an attack that killed 75 people at a Shia mosque, Al-Khalisi said:

The people behind the explosions seek to create sectarian strife between the people of Iraq. However, Iraqis will never allow this to happen.

INFC do however uphold the right of armed resistance to occupation, but condemn the targeting of Iraqis and the taking of hostages as a tactic.

With regard to the Israel–Palestine issue, the INFC adopts a hardline position. The 2005 congressional session states that 'It [INFC] rejects the establishment of any political or normalisation links with the Zionist, usurper settler entity'. It also makes reference to "US-imperialist and Zionist plans to impose its will on humanity".

== See also ==
- Iraq Insurgency
- Sectarian violence in Iraq
- Sunni-Shia relations
