= Shihab al-Tamimi =

Iraqi journalist

Shihab al-Tamimi (died 27 February 2008) was an Iraqi journalist and head of the Journalists Syndicate. He was a fierce critic of Iraqi sectarian violence.

He was shot in the chest on 24 February 2008 by gunmen in Baghdad. He died of a heart attack three days later.
