= February 2014 Green Zone bombings =

Terrorist incident in Baghdad, Iraq

5 February 2014 Baghdad bombings
- Location: Baghdad, Iraq
- Date: 5 February 2014
- Deaths: 32
- Injuries: 35

The heavily fortified Green zone in Baghdad, where most government ministries and foreign embassies are, was attacked when two parked car bombs exploded outside the Foreign Affairs ministry, killing 11 people and injuring 15 others. Soon after, a suicide bomber walked into a restaurant near the Green zone and detonated his explosive device, killing an additional eight people and wounding 12 others. A third car bomb exploded on a commercial street in a northern suburb of Baghdad killing four and injuring eight. A total of 32 people were killed in the four blasts.
