= Amal Taha =

Iraqi actress and comedian (1956-2016)

- امل طه
- Born: 19 September 1956; Dhi Qar, Iraq
- Died: 19 May 2016 (aged 59)
- Occupations: Actress; comedian

Amal Taha (Note: Arabic: امل طه) (19 September 1956 – 19 May 2016) was an Iraqi film actress and comedian. She was born on 19 September 1956 in Dhi Qar, southern Iraq. Amal played many roles both on TV and on stage. She is best known for her roles in the play "The Thread and the Bird", the "Holidays" TV shows, and the "afternoon break" entertainment program.

Amal died on 19 May 2016 after years of struggle with paralysis caused by a stroke she had in 2009.
