= Samira Saleh Ali al-Naimi =

Iraqi human rights activist and lawyer

Samira Saleh Ali al-Naimi (1963 – 22 September 2014) was an Iraqi human rights activist and lawyer. During the Islamic State of Iraq and the Levant's occupation of Mosul, she posted comments on her Facebook account critical of ISIS’s destruction of religious shrines there. She was abducted from her home by masked men on 17 September and tried by a "self-styled" Sharia court for apostasy. After being tortured for five days, she was publicly executed on 22 September 2014.

Her killing was condemned by the United States State Department. The Gulf Center for Human Rights condemned the execution, recalling the "prominent lawyer and human rights defender... defending detainees and supporting the disadvantaged families in the city", adding that "this heinous crime and other ISIS crimes are crimes against humanity."

== See also ==
- Amira Karroum – Australian jihadist killed in Syrian Civil War
- Nadia Murad – Yazidi human rights activist
- Raqqa Is Being Slaughtered Silently – Syrian citizen journalist group
- Razan Zaitouneh – Syrian human rights lawyer and activist
