= Kidnapping and murder of Ihab el-Sherif =

Egyptian ambassador

Ihab el-Sherif
- Born: January 1954
- Disappeared: July 3, 2005; Baghdad, Iraq
- Died: July 6–7, 2005
- Known for: Victim of al-Qaeda kidnapping and execution

Ihab el-Sherif (January 1954 – July 2005) was an Egyptian diplomat who served as Egypt's ambassador to Iraq until Iraqi kidnappers murdered him in July 2005. He had previously served as Egypt's chargé d'affaires to Israel.

== Kidnapping and death ==
He was kidnapped on July 3, 2005, when he stepped out of his car in Baghdad to buy a newspaper.

The al-Qaeda in Iraq organization, run by Abu Musab al-Zarqawi, once Iraq's most wanted militant, posted a message on the internet on July 6, 2005, which stated: "The Islamic court of the al-Qaeda Organization in the Land of Two Rivers has decided to refer the ambassador of the state of Egypt, an ally of the Jews and the Christians, to the mujahideen so that they can execute him." Earlier that day, the group had posted photos of Sherif's identification cards.

On July 7, 2005, al-Qaeda in Iraq uploaded to the internet a video of Sherif blindfolded, giving his name and address and acknowledging that he once worked as a diplomat in Israel. The video was accompanied by an announcement that el-Sherif had been killed, claiming that "the verdict of God against the ambassador of the infidels, the ambassador of Egypt, has been carried out". His death was subsequently confirmed by the Egyptian government.

== Arrests ==
On July 14, 2005, United States troops arrested Khamis Farhan Khalaf and al-Fahdawi, the alleged al-Qaida leader suspected to be responsible for Sherif's murder.

== See also ==
- List of kidnappings
- List of solved missing person cases (2000s)
- List of unsolved murders (2000–present)
