= Mahir al-Zubaydi =

Al-Qaeda military commander

- Born: Adhamiya, Baghdad, Iraq
- Died: October 3, 2008
- Military career
- Allegiance: Al-Qaeda in Iraq
- Rank: Commander
- Nicknames: Abu Assad; Abu Rami

Mahir al-Zubaydi (died October 3, 2008 in Adhamiya, Baghdad, Iraq), also known as Abu Assad or Abu Rami, was a military commander in Al-Qaeda in Iraq. Zubaydi is believed to have headed the group that were behind bombings which killed at least 16 people in Baghdad in October 2008. The U.S. military says Zubaydi was a suspect in several other attacks against Iraqis and U.S. forces in past years. Zubaydi also took part in a videotaped killing of four Russian diplomats in June 2006.

== Death ==
US troops targeted Zubaydi on October 3, 2008, after receiving intelligence following bombings in Baghdad against Shia Muslim mosques. Troops tracked him down to a house in the Adhamiya district of Baghdad (a predominantly Sunni Muslim area), surrounded the building and used loud speakers to order him to surrender. The Americans say he responded by shooting at them, so they shot him. A woman reported to be his wife was also killed.
