= Riad al-Saray =

Iraqi journalist

Riad al-Saray (1975 – 7 September 2010) was an Iraqi journalist, television presenter, lawyer and politician. He worked for the national TV channel Al Iraqiya from 2005 until his death. He was killed in a drive-by shooting carried out by a group of unknown gunmen. His murder was condemned by Reporters Without Borders and the British embassy in Baghdad, among others.

== Career ==
Saray joined the national Al Iraqiya network in 2005 and was the presenter of several religious and political programmes. He has been praised for attempting to reduce sectarian divides in Iraqi society through his programmes. He was not considered to be a controversial journalist, despite addressing political matters on air. In addition to his television work Saray sat on the local council in the Shia neighbourhood of Al-Shu'ala in north-west Baghdad and once served as its mayor. Saray was a trained lawyer and was married with three young children.

== Assassination ==

On 7 September 2010 Saray was shot whilst driving to work from his home in Harithiya, Baghdad to Karbala in the south. The attack occurred in Mansour district, western Baghdad at 6 am local time (3 am GMT) and was carried out by a group of gunmen, driving past in a speeding car. A silencer is believed to have been used during the attack as nearby traffic police did not hear any shots before witnessing Saray's car leave the road and crashing.

Saray became the 15th al-Iraqiya journalist to be killed since the fall of Saddam Hussein's regime, the highest individual death toll for any media organisation. His death was described by Reporters Without Borders (RWB) as a "targeted murder" and the organisation called for the authorities to investigate, arrest and punish the attackers. The Committee to Protect Journalists and the British embassy deplored the killing of Saray with the latter stating that "a free and courageous press is an essential component of democracy. We support journalists in Iraq [and] assure them of our continuous support in the face of violence and intimidation". The Director-General of the United Nations Educational, Scientific and Cultural Organization, Irina Bokova, also spoke out against Saray's murder stating that "such attacks on journalists are attacks on the fundamental right of freedom of expression".

Saray's death came the same day that RWB announced that the Iraq War had become the most deadly for journalists since the Second World War with 230 journalists killed. In addition the RWB called "for a proper investigation capable of identifying and arresting both the perpetrators and instigators of this murder and bringing them to justice ... it would be deplorable if this killing were to go unpunished, which unfortunately has been the case in 99 per cent of the ... journalists and media workers [killed] since the US-led invasion in 2003". Saray was buried in the city of Najaf on 7 September and a mourning ceremony was later held at the local governor's office.
