= 2015 Qatari hunters kidnapping =

Hostage taking in Muthanna Governorate, Iraq

The 2015 Qatari hunters kidnapping set off a hostage crisis of nearly a year and a half in Iraq and involved negotiations and deals between many neighboring states. On Wednesday 16 December 2015, at about 3:00am local time, a party of 28 Qatari hunters, including members of the ruling royal House of Thani, were taken hostage in Muthanna Governorate, Iraq, in the desert area of Busaya not far from the border with Saudi Arabia. The Qataris remained in the hands of their kidnappers until 2017, when a deal in Syria and the payment of a ransom led to their release.

== Background ==
The desert of Muthanna Governorate is a popular location for wealthy hunting parties from the Gulf nations who travel there for falconry and hunting festivals.

== Hostage taking ==
At about 3:00am local time, on Wednesday 16 December 2015, "an armed group driving dozens of pickup trucks kidnapped at least 26 Qatari hunters from their camp in the area of Busaya in Samawa desert near Saudi borders", according to Samawa regional governor Falih al-Zayady.

A police colonel quoted by Reuters said: "We are talking about at least 100 gunmen armed with light and medium weapons who broke into the Qatari camp and abducted the hunters at around 3 am local time on Wednesday."

The hunting party was accompanied by a small group of Iraqi security forces who surrendered in the face of the larger militant force.

== Motive ==
It is believed the party were taken hostage by Kata'ib Hezbollah, an Iraqi Shiite militia supported by Iran. Their intention was to use the hostages as leverage on Qatar, which was a supporter of Sunni rebel groups in Syria such as Ahrar al-Sham and Jabhat Fateh al-Sham who were participating in the Siege of al-Fu'ah and Kafriya, two Shiite villages in northern Syria.

== Negotiations ==
On 6 April 2016, two men including a member of the Qatari royal family and a Pakistani man were freed, according to the Qatari foreign ministry, who stated efforts were continuing to free those still held hostage.

On 11 April 2017, Associated Press reported that Khalifa bin Fahed bin Mohammed Al Thani signed a contract worth $2 million dated 8 March with a San Diego-based firm called Global Strategies Council Inc. The contract calls for the group "to obtain proof of life," speak to government agencies and "attempt to negotiate with captors for the release of captive members of the royal family of Qatar."

Asked about the $2 million payment, Qatar's Government Communications Office issued a statement to the AP saying the U.S. firm was "retained by a Qatari citizen acting in a private capacity." "We consider the hostage issue in Iraq of the utmost importance and it remains our top priority," the government said. "We continue to engage in securing their safe release."

On 19 April 2017, the Iraqi prime minister Haider al-Abadi said "friendly" neighboring countries had been contacted over the case and that a Qatari official was in the country "to help in their release."

== Syrian deal ==
On Friday 14 April 2017, Shiite residents of al-Fu'ah and Kafriya began leaving the villages and heading to government held Aleppo in a deal finalized after nearly two years of negotiations between Ahrar al-Sham, Qatar and Iran. The Qatari hostages were offered up as a component of the swap by Iran. At the same time the first buses carrying Sunni residents began leaving Zabadani and Madaya to rebel-held areas of Idlib province as part of the deal.

== Release, ransom, and Gulf row ==
After a deal brokered between Iran and Ahrar al-Sham for the evacuation of the four towns, the 26 remaining Qatari hostages were freed. The Iraqi interior ministry said "all 26" were in Baghdad and would be handed over to a Qatari envoy.

Qatar also paid a ransom to have the hunters released. According to the Financial Times Qatar paid $700 million to Iranian-backed Shi'a militias in Iraq, $120–140 million to Tahrir al-Sham, and $80 million to Ahrar al-Sham. The New York Times, meanwhile, reported that Qatar paid 500 million euros to Kataibb Hezbollah, who were believed to be the kidnappers. Angered at this funding of Iranian proxies, Iraqi PM Abadi ordered the 500 million seized and impounded at the central bank in Baghdad.

The ransom payment was one of the precipitating factors of the 2017 Qatar diplomatic crisis.
