= 1992 in Iraq =

- Decades: 1970s; 1980s; 1990s; 2000s; 2010s
- See also: Other events of 1992; List of years in Iraq

The following lists events that happened during 1992 in Iraq.

== Incumbents ==
- President: Saddam Hussein
- Prime Minister: Mohammed Hamza Zubeidi
- Vice President:
  - Taha Muhie-eldin Marouf
  - Taha Yassin Ramadan
  - Izzat Ibrahim al-Douri

== Events ==
- January, February and July: Iraq refuses United Nations Special Commission (UNSCOM) entry to several locations, which were considered breaches in the cease-fire terms of the Gulf war.
- 19 May – Kurdistan Region general election result in an almost even split of the 105 parliamentary seats between the Kurdistan Democratic Party and the Patriotic Union of Kurdistan winning 51 and 49 seats respectively.
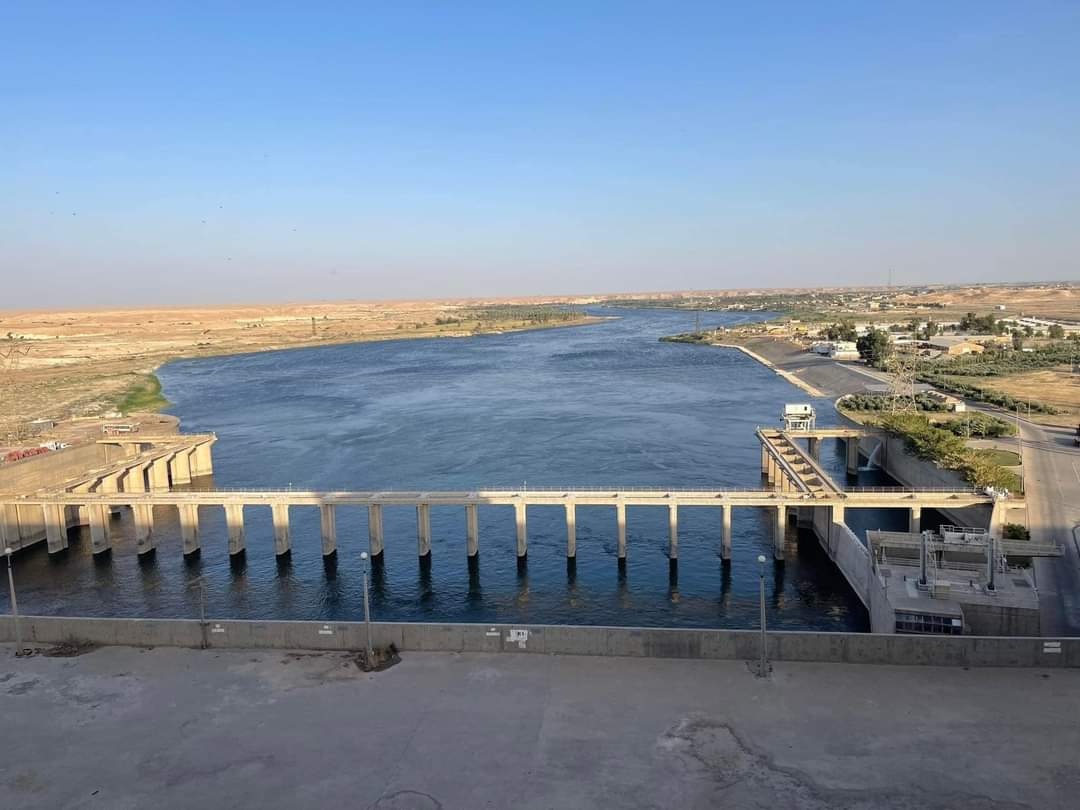
  Haditha dam, 2024
- 26 August – United Nations Security Council Resolution 773 is adopted to assign a committee for drawing the Iraqi-Kuwaiti borders.

=== Date Unknown ===
- Work starts on the Basra Water Canal and the Haditha Dam Reservoir Projects.
- The Main Outfall Drain (MOD) irrigation project is completed.
- The two stories bridge (formerly Saddam bridge) in Baghdad is opened to the public after 15 months of construction.

== Births ==
- 1 January – Ahmed Fadhil Mohammed, footballer.
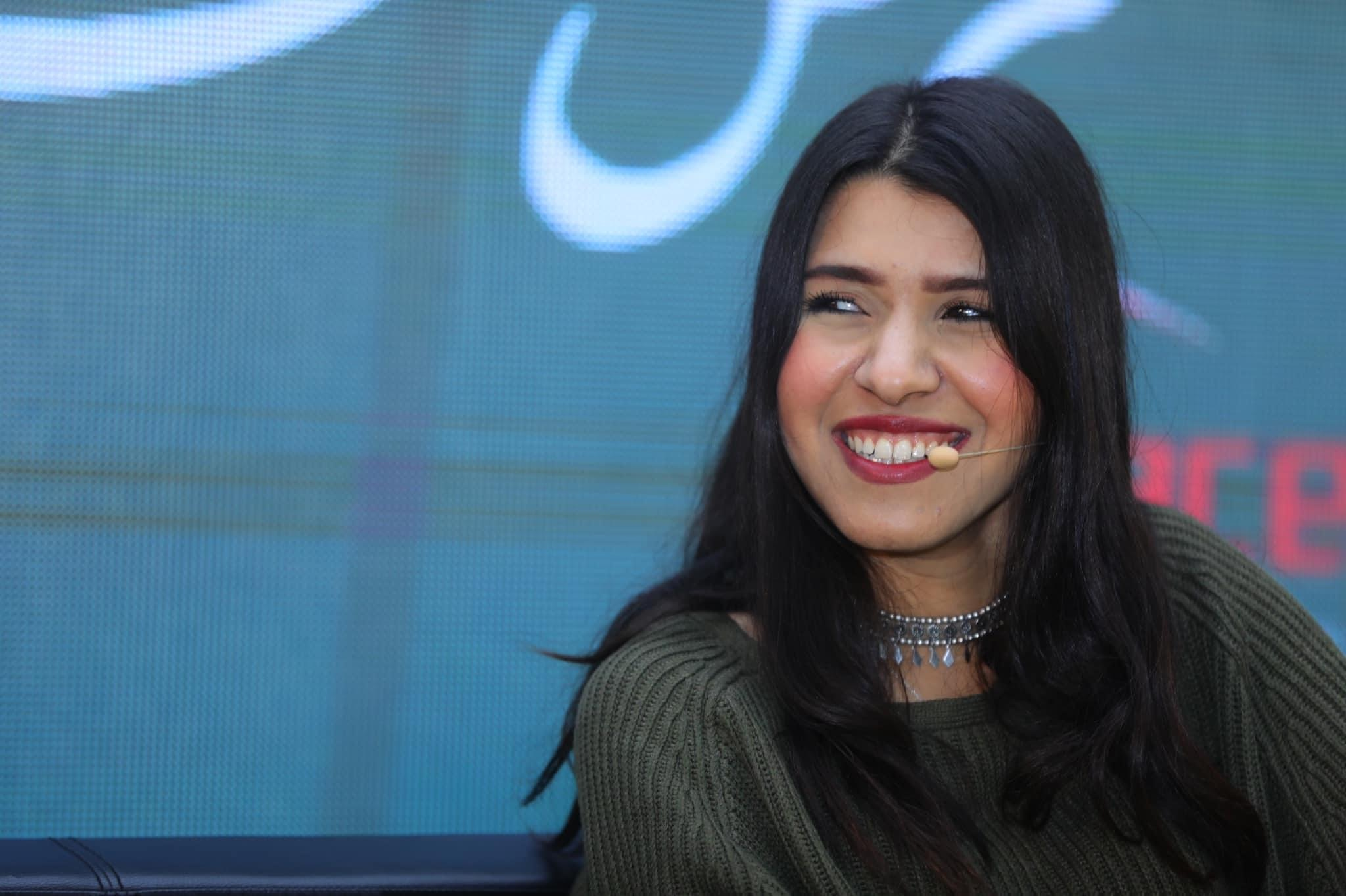
  Aya Mansour
- 19 January – Saad Abdul-Amir, footballer.
- 24 January – Herdi Noor Al-Deen, footballer.
- 12 April – Rebin Ghareeb Solaka, footballer.
- 11 November – Aya Mansour, poet and Journalist.

== Deaths ==
21 July – Youra Eshaya, footballer. (b.1933)

=== Date Unknown ===
- Lamiya Tawfiq, singer. (b.1937)
- Faeq Hassan, painter .(b.1914)
