= 1996 in Iraq =

- Decades: 1970s; 1980s; 1990s; 2000s; 2010s
- See also: Other events of 1996; List of years in Iraq

The following lists events that happened during 1996 in Iraq.

== Incumbents ==
- President: Saddam Hussein
- Prime Minister: Saddam Hussein
- Vice President:
  - Taha Muhie-eldin Marouf
  - Taha Yassin Ramadan
  - Izzat Ibrahim al-Douri

== Events ==
- 24 March –Iraqi parliamentary election are held, the Ba'ath Party wins 161 seats out of 250, with significant gains to independent candidates as well as the appointment of 30 MPs to represent Kurdistan.
- 20 May – Iraq accepts and signs the revised Oil-for-Food Programme.
- 31 August – at the request of the Kurdistan Democratic Party leadership, Iraqi troops captured the Patriotic Union of Kurdistan held city of Erbil and the Battle of Erbil took place as part of the Kurdish Civil War.
- 3 September– a US cruise missile airstrike campaign codenamed Operation Desert Strike is launched in retaliation of the Iraqi army involvement in the Kurdish Civil War.
- 10 December – The Oil-for-Food Programme implementation begins with the first Iraqi oil export.

== Births ==
- 10 January – Tara Fares, model and influencer.(d.1918)
- 19 January – Ali Yousif Hashim, footballer.
- 22 March – Aymen Hussein, footballer.
- 25 May – Sherko Kareem Lateef, footballer.
- 19 August – Ahmed Basil Fadhil, footballer.
- 16 November – Munaf Younis, footballer.
- 6 December – Mohammed Qasim Majid, footballer.
- 22 December – Bashar Resan Bonyan, footballer.

== Deaths ==
- 23 February – Hussein Kamel al-Majid, Saddam Hussein's son-in-law (b.1960)
- 23 February – Saddam Kamel, Saddam Hussein's son-in-law (b.1960)
- 11 March – Zaki al-Sarraf, journalist and poet.
- 15 October – Toma Tomas, Iraqi Assyrian politician (b.1924)
- 22 October – Mustafa Jamal al-Din, scholar and writer. (b.1926)
