= 1985 in Iraq =

- Decades: 1960s; 1970s; 1980s; 1990s; 2000s
- See also: Other events of 1985; List of years in Iraq

The following lists events that happened during 1985 in Iraq.

== Incumbents ==
- President: Saddam Hussein
- Prime Minister: Saddam Hussein
- Vice President:
  - Taha Muhie-eldin Marouf
  - Izzat Ibrahim al-Douri

== Events ==
- 28 January – Iraq launched the first major offensive against Iran since the start of the Iran-Iraq war in 1980.
- 11 March – Iran's launches a counteroffensive targeting the Iraqi southern city of Basra.
- December – President Saddam Hussain visits Moscow to meet Mikhail Gorbachev in an attempt to improve relations between Iraq and the Soviet union.

== Births ==
- 1 January – Ali Jawad Ismail, Iraqi footballer.
- 31 May – Suhair al-Qaisi, Iraqi news anchor and media personality.
