= 1993 in Iraq =

- Decades: 1970s; 1980s; 1990s; 2000s; 2010s
- See also: Other events of 1993; List of years in Iraq

The following lists events that happened during 1993 in Iraq.

== Incumbents ==
- President: Saddam Hussein
- Prime Minister:
  - Mohammed Hamza Zubeidi (until September 5)
  - Ahmad Husayn Khudayir as-Samarrai (starting September 5)
- Vice President:
  - Taha Muhie-eldin Marouf
  - Taha Yassin Ramadan
  - Izzat Ibrahim al-Douri

== Events ==
- 13 January – A series of airstrikes on Iraq are carried out by the US lead coalition forces.
- 27 May – United Nations Security Council Resolution 833 is passed formalizing the Iraqi-Kuwaiti borders, Iraq protested the decision due to the way it divided the Khawr Abd Allah channel.
- 26 June – Cruise missile airstrikes on Iraq is ordered by U.S. President Bill Clinton as retaliation for Iraq alleged involvement in an assassination attempt on former President George H. W. Bush.

== Births ==
- 10 March – Nadia Murad, Iraqi Yazidi human rights activist.
- 28 June – Safaa Al Sarai, Iraqi political activist, known for being an icon of the 2019 Iraqi protests in which he was killed by security forces.(d.2019)
- 1 July – Saif Salman, Footballer.
- 14 July – Frans Dhia Jirjis, Iraqi-Danish footballer.
- 9 August – Ali Yaseen Yas, footballer.
- 23 September – Mustafa Nadhim Jari, footballer.
- 24 September – Hawbir Mustafa, Iraqi-Dutch footballer.
- 9 November– Amjad Walid, footballer.

== Deaths ==
- 20 April – Khairallah Talfah, Iraqi military officer and politician.(b.c.1910)
- 27June – Layla Al-Attar, Iraqi artist and painter. (b.1944)
