= 1995 in Iraq =

- Decades: 1970s; 1980s; 1990s; 2000s; 2010s
- See also: Other events of 1995; List of years in Iraq

The following lists events that happened during 1995 in Iraq.

== Incumbents ==
- President: Saddam Hussein
- Prime Minister: Saddam Hussein
- Vice President:
  - Taha Muhie-eldin Marouf
  - Taha Yassin Ramadan
  - Izzat Ibrahim al-Douri

== Events ==
- 3 March – The Iraqi National Congress, backed by the CIA, along with the Patriotic Union of Kurdistan attack the city of Kirkuk, the incursion increased the opposition's foothold in northern Iraq but did not meaningfully change the map as the expected US support didn't materialize.
- March – A failed coup against Saddam Hussain is carried out by former Iraqi military general Wafiq al-Samarrai.
- 14 April – UN Security Council Resolution 986 is adopted to establish a mechanism for Iraqi sale of oil and receiving humanitarian aid in exchange to alleviate the suffering caused by the sanctions. This program is better known as the Oil-for-Food Programme.
- 15 October – The first Iraqi presidential referendum is held, asking Iraqis to vote on their approval of the government.

== Births ==
- January – Mustafa Al-Bassam, Iraqi-British hacker and computer security expert.
- 1 July – Ahmed Yahya, Iraqi footballer.

== Deaths ==
- 13 July –Ali Al-Wardi, Iraqi sociologist and intellectual. (b.1913)
- 8 September – Safa Khulusi, Iraqi writer and historian (b.1917)
