= 1994 in Iraq =

- Decades: 1970s; 1980s; 1990s; 2000s; 2010s
- See also: Other events of 1994; List of years in Iraq

The following lists events that happened during 1994 in Iraq.

== Incumbents ==
- President: Saddam Hussein
- Prime Minister:
  - Ahmad Husayn Khudayir as-Samarrai (until April 9)
  - Saddam Hussein (starting 29 May)
- Vice President:
  - Taha Muhie-eldin Marouf
  - Taha Yassin Ramadan
  - Izzat Ibrahim al-Douri

== Events ==
- Baghdad Tower
  May – The Kurdish Civil War breaks out between the two leading Kurdish parties, the Patriotic Union of Kurdistan and the Kurdistan Democratic Party over power sharing in the Iraqi Kurdistan government.
- 10 November – Iraq recognizes the Sovereignty of Kuwait and accepts its UN recognized borders in a bid to have the sanctions lifted.

=== Date Unknown ===
- Baghdad tower, a landmark of the city of Baghdad is opened to the public. Work on the tower started in 1991 and stalled due to being damaged during the Gulf war and the subsequent sanctions.

== Births ==
- 12 January – Noor Al-Ameri, athlete.
- 28 January – Mustafa Saadoon, footballer
- 1 April –Hayder Al-Ogaili, athlete and Olympian.
- 9 May –Ahmad Abbas Hattab, footballer.
- 21 October – Fahad Talib Raheem, footballer.
- 1 December –Aso Rostam, footballer.

== Deaths ==
- 17 November – Mohammed Kadhim al-Qazwini, Iraqi religious scholar. (b.1930)
- 12 December – Jabra Ibrahim Jabra, Palestinian-Iraqi writer and translator. (b.1920)
