= 1997 in Iraq =

- Decades: 1970s; 1980s; 1990s; 2000s; 2010s
- See also: Other events of 1997; List of years in Iraq

The following lists events that happened during 1997 in Iraq.

== Incumbents ==
- President: Saddam Hussein
- Prime Minister: Saddam Hussein
- Vice President:
  - Taha Muhie-eldin Marouf
  - Taha Yassin Ramadan
  - Izzat Ibrahim al-Douri

== Events ==
- 15 January – The proceeds of the first Iraqi sale of oil are deposited at a special UN account as part of the Oil-for-Food Programme.
- 20 March – The first shipment of food and other commodities is delivered to Iraq as part of phase 1of the Oil-for-Food Programme.
- 16 October – The Iraqi national census is conducted, estimating the population of Iraq at 22,046,000.
- 14 November – Iraq expels 6 American weapon inspectors, and the UN orders inspectors from other nationalities to leave the country.

== Births ==
- 12 March – Amjed Attwan Kadhim, Iraqi footballer
- 2 April – Mazin Fayyadh, Iraqi footballer.
- 27 July – Alaa Abbas Abdulnabi, Iraqi footballer

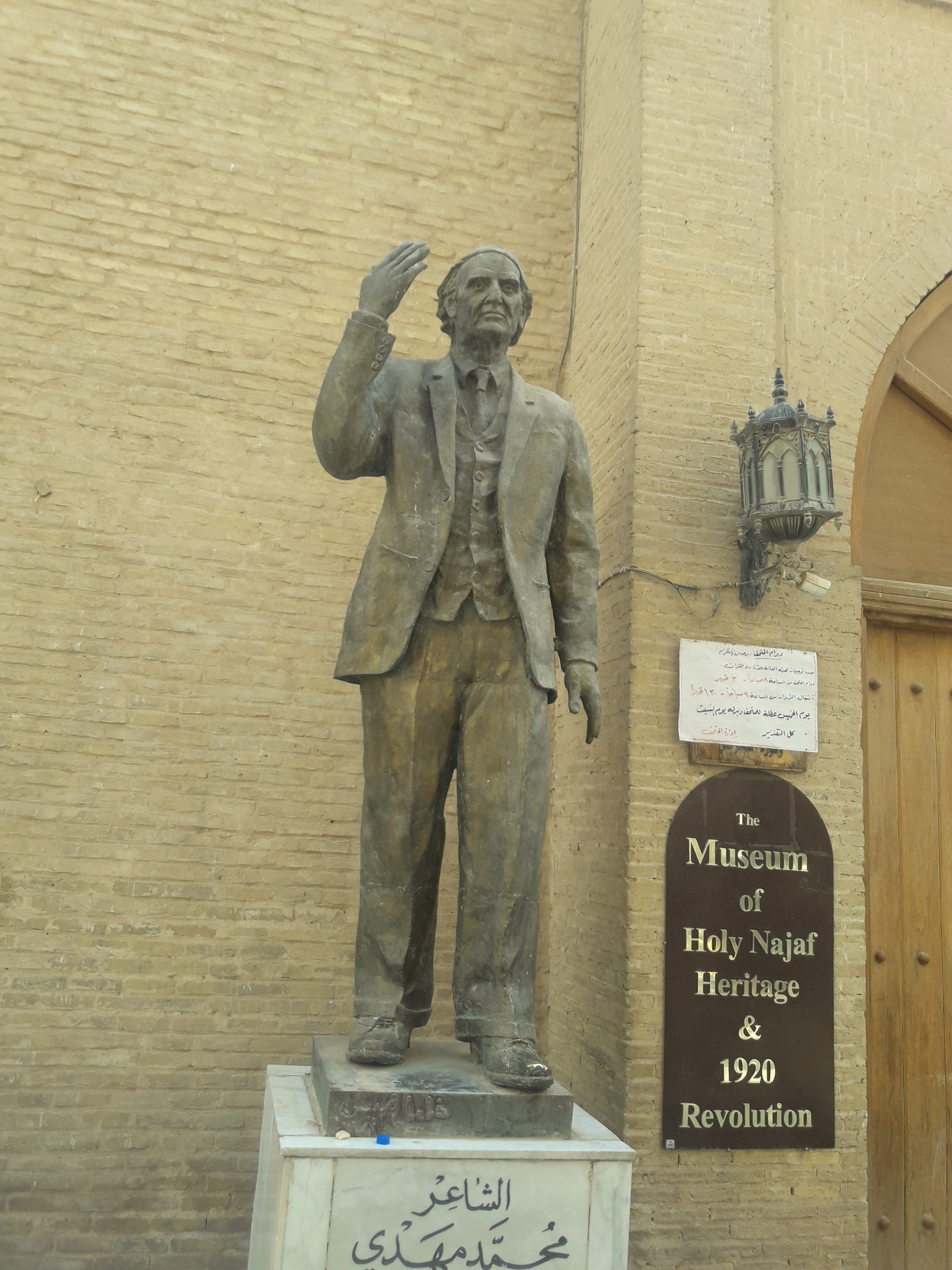
Muhammad Mahdi al-Jawahiri

== Deaths ==
- 8 May – Saleem Al-Basri, Iraqi actor. (b.1926)
- 24 May – Muhammad Fadhel al-Jamali, Iraqi politician and diplomat.(b.1903)
- 27 July – Muhammad Mahdi al-Jawahiri, Iraqi poet .(b.1899)
- 1 ِAugust – Hayat Sharara, Iraqi writer and translator. (b.c. 1937)
- 28 September – Munir Bashir, Iraqi-Assyrian musician famous for playing the oud.(b.1930)
- 12 October – Talib El-Shibib, Iraqi politician. (b.1934)
- 9 November – Atika Wahbi al-Khazraji, Iraqi poet. (b.1924)
