= 1990 in Iraq =

- Decades: 1970s; 1980s; 1990s; 2000s; 2010s
- See also: Other events of 1990; List of years in Iraq

The following lists events that happened during 1990 in Iraq.

== Incumbents ==
- President: Saddam Hussein
- Prime Minister: Saddam Hussein
- Vice President:
  - Taha Muhie-eldin Marouf
  - Izzat Ibrahim al-Douri

== Events ==
- 2 August – The Iraqi army invades Kuwait, starting the Gulf war.
- 9 August – The UN security council issues Resolution 662, declaring the Iraqi annexation of Kuwait "null and void"
- 25 August – United Nations Security Council Resolution 665 issued authorizing a blockade on Iraq and leading to International sanctions against Iraq, which were largely enforced until the 2003 invasion of Iraq.
- 6 December – Iraq announces the release of thousands of foreign nationals being held in the Gulf since the fall of Kuwait.
- 10 December – British hostages who were held in Iraq arrive at Heathrow airport.

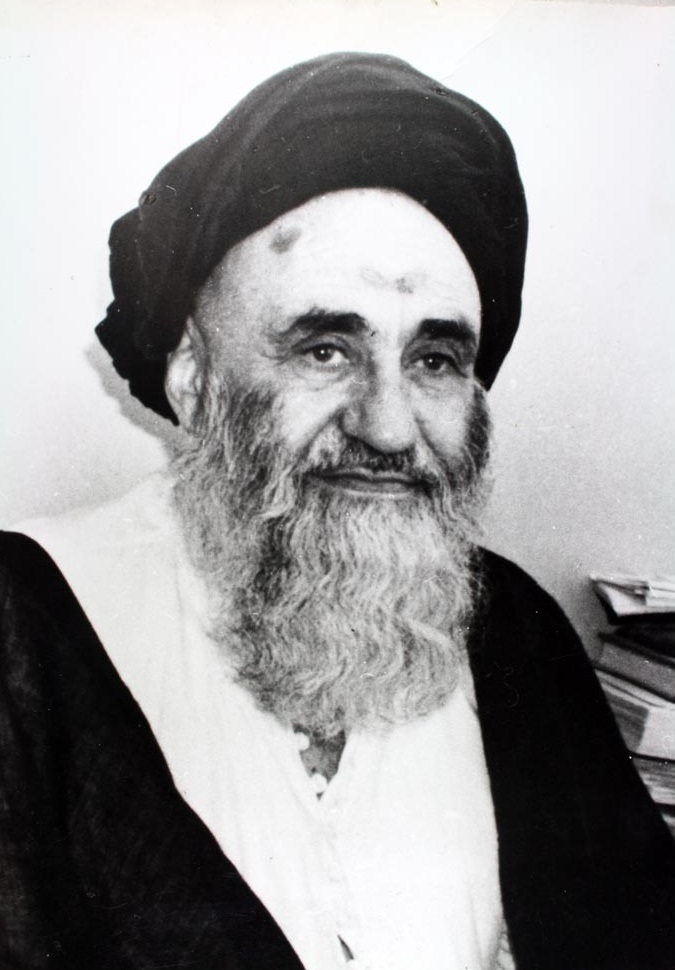
Shahab ud-Din Mar'ashi Najafi

== Births ==
- 1 January – Safaa Rashed, Iraqi weightlifter.
- 4 February –Sarah Idan, Iraqi model, and beauty pageant titleholder.
- 11 March – Akar Ali Salih Salih, Iraqi chess player.
- 17 July – Amjad Radhi, Iraqi footballer.
- 15 August – Salwan Georges, Iraqi photojournalist.
- 19 August – Zainab Al-Eqabi, Iraqi para-athlete, activist and TV personality.

== Deaths ==
- 29 August – Shahab ud-Din Mar'ashi Najafi, Iraqi Shia cleric. (b.1897)
