= 1989 in Iraq =

- Decades: 1960s; 1970s; 1980s; 1990s; 2000s
- See also: Other events of 1989; List of years in Iraq

The following lists events that happened during 1989 in Iraq.

== Incumbents ==
- President: Saddam Hussein
- Prime Minister: Saddam Hussein
- Vice President:
  - Taha Muhie-eldin Marouf
  - Izzat Ibrahim al-Douri

== Events ==
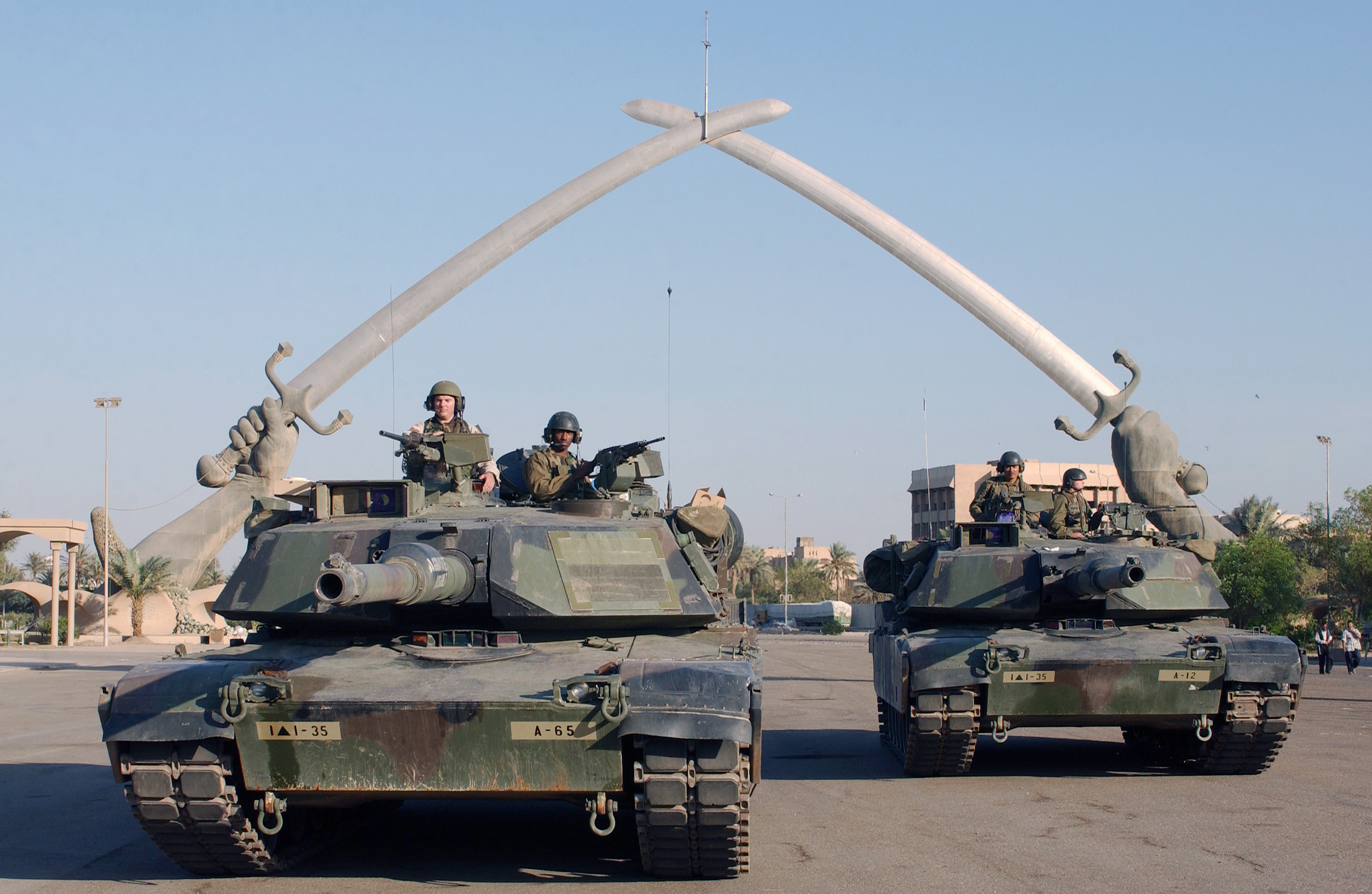
- Victory Arch, Baghdad 2003
  16 February – an agreement is signed in Baghdad by Iraq, Jordan, Egypt and Yemen to form the Arab Cooperation Council
- 1 April – Iraqi parliamentary election are held, as a result the Ba'ath Party won 207 of the 250 seats.
- 8 August –the Victory Arch monument is opened to the public in honor of the Iraqi soldiers who fell during the Iran–Iraq War, which concluded a year earlier.

=== Date Unknown ===
- The Iraqi University is established.

== Births ==
- 28 February – Neama Riadh, Iraqi TV presenter.
- 1 July – Miran Khesro, Iraqi footballer.
- 21 August – Karoj Sindi, Iraqi-German footballer.
- 3 September – Rayan al-Kildani, Iraqi Assyrian politician.
- 29 September – Lawen Redar, Iraqi-Swedish politician .
- 30 September – Zahraa Ben Mime, Iraqi-Tunisian actress and model.
- 14 October – Mohammed Abdul-Zahra, Iraqi footballer.

=== Date Unknown ===
- Roza Salih, Iraqi-Scottish politician.

== Deaths ==
- 13 March – Dilshad Meriwani, Iraqi Kurdish poet, teacher and translator.(b.1947)
- 13 April – Mar Paul II Cheikho, Iraqi Assyrian and Chaldean Patriarch. (b.1906)
- 2 April – Muhammad al-Qubanchi, Iraqi Maqam singer.(b.1904)
- 4 May – Adnan Khayr Allah, Iraqi military officer and politician. (b.1940)
