= 1991 in Iraq =

- Decades: 1970s; 1980s; 1990s; 2000s; 2010s
- See also: Other events of 1991; List of years in Iraq

The following lists events that happened during 1991 in Iraq.

== Incumbents ==
- President: Saddam Hussein
- Prime Minister:
  - Saddam Hussein (until March)
  - Sa'dun Hammadi (23 March – 13 September)
  - Mohammed Hamza Zubeidi (starting September 16)
- Vice President:
  - Taha Muhie-eldin Marouf
  - Taha Yassin Ramadan
  - Izzat Ibrahim al-Douri

== Events ==
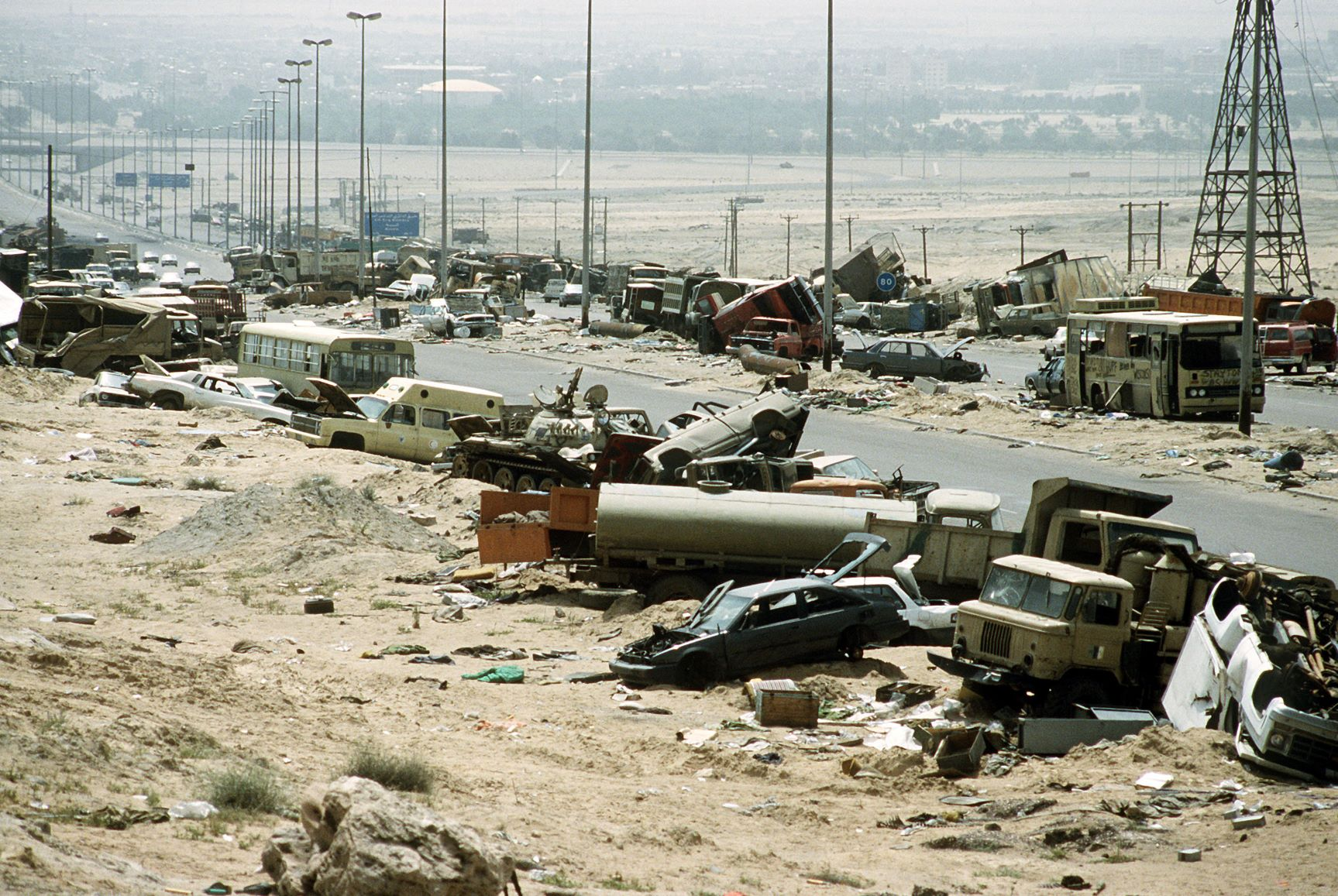
Highway 80 on 18 Apr 1991

- 15 January -The deadline for Iraq compliance with the UN Resolution 678, which stipulated that Iraq must withdraw from Kuwait. Iraq fails to comply.
- 17 January - Operation Desert storm starts with the American led coalition forces sending hundreds of planes on to carry out around 400 bombing raids into Iraq.
- 29–30 January - Battle of Khafji, first major ground engagement of the Gulf War. Iraqi tropes captured the city of Khafji on the Kuwaiti - Saudi Arabian border.
- 26–27 February-coalition forces airstrikes and ground attacks struck the retreating Iraqi military and some civilians on the road known as Highway 80 between Kuwait City and Basra. The controversial incident is known as the Highway of Death.
- 28 February - Iraq announces it will agree to a ceasefire.
- 1 March - an uprising in the south and Kurdish regions of Iraq starts in the city of Basra.

=== Date Unknown ===
- The University of Babylon is established.
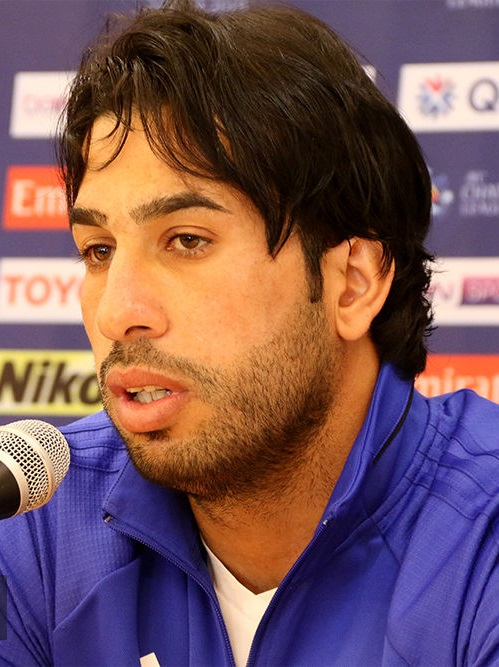
  Jalal Hassan

== Births ==
- 27 April - Haidar Raad, Iraqi footballer.
- 10 May - Yaser Kasim, Iraqi footballer.
- 18 May -Jalal Hassan, Iraqi footballer
- 18 July - Zuhal Sultan, Iraqi pianist and activists.

=== Date Unknown ===
- Faisal Saeed Al Mutar -Iraqi American human-rights activist.
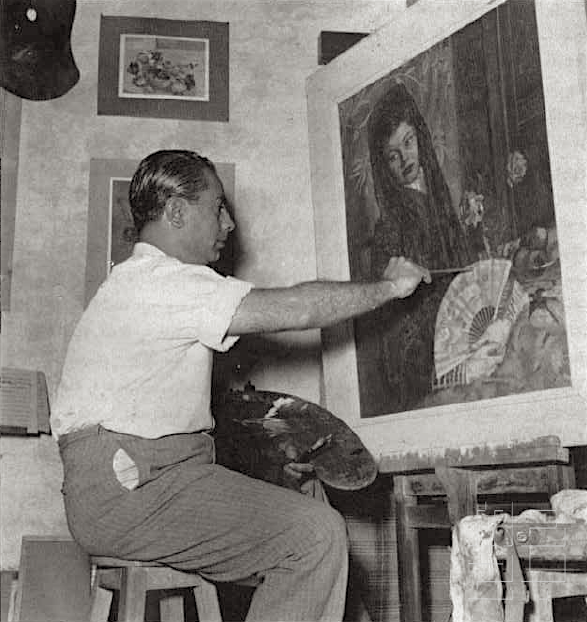
  Hafidh al-Droubi
- Ali Ismail Abbas- Iraqi 2003 invasion victim who lost his family and limbs and got heavily featured in the media.

== Deaths ==
- 23 January - Hafidh al-Droubi, Iraqi painter (b.1914)
- 29 August- Abrahim Jalal, Iraqi actor (b. 1920)
- 7 November – Nuri Ja'far, Iraqi psychologist. (b.1914)
