= 1988 in Iraq =

- Decades: 1960s; 1970s; 1980s; 1990s; 2000s
- See also: Other events of 1988; List of years in Iraq

The following lists events that happened during 1988 in Iraq.

== Incumbents ==
- President: Saddam Hussein
- Prime Minister: Saddam Hussein
- Vice President:
  - Taha Muhie-eldin Marouf
  - Izzat Ibrahim al-Douri

== Events ==
- 16 March – The Halabja massacre is carried out by Iraqi forces using chemical weapons in the northern Kurdish city of Halabja, which was occupied by Iran days earlier as part of the Iran–Iraq War.
- 17 April – Second Battle of al-Faw started to free the Al-Faw peninsula in southern Iraq, which has been under Iranian occupation for 2 years. The campaign was successful and by the 20th of April, the peninsula was under Iraqi control.
- 8 August – The 8-year long Iran-Iraq war ends with the announcement of a ceasefire.

== Births ==
- 10 January – Ameer Sabah, Iraqi footballer.
- 20 January – Ghazwan Jassem, Iraqi television presenter.
- 11 March – Halgurd Mulla Mohammed, Iraqi footballer.
- 27 May – Yassir Abdul-Mohsen, Iraqi footballer.
- 2 June – Sama Dizayee, Iraqi Journalist.

=== Date Unknown ===
- Dhu'l-Nun Ayyub, Iraqi novelist. (b.1908)
