= 1972 in Iraq =

- Decades: 1950s; 1960s; 1970s; 1980s; 1990s
- See also: Other events of 1972; List of years in Iraq

The following lists events that happened during 1972 in the Iraqi Republic.

== Incumbents ==
- President: Ahmed Hassan al-Bakr
- Prime Minister: Ahmed Hassan al-Bakr
- Vice President: Saddam Hussein

== Events ==
=== April ===
- 9 April – The Iraqi-Soviet Treaty of Friendship and Co-operation was signed in Baghdad, for a term of 15 years, after which the USSR supplied increased military aid to Iraq, as part of an agreement "to develop their cooperation in the matter of strengthening their defence capacity".

=== June ===
- 1 June – The Iraq Petroleum Company was completely nationalized by the government of Iraq, through its Public Law 69, making the company part of the state-owned Iraq National Oil Company.

== Births ==
- 28 January – Mohammad Iqbal Omar, Iraqi politician.
- 4 August – Saad Maan, Iraqi military officer.

=== Date Unknown ===
- Abdul Sattar Abu Risha, Iraqi tribal leader.(d.2007)
