= 1982 in Iraq =

- Decades: 1960s; 1970s; 1980s; 1990s; 2000s
- See also: Other events of 1982; List of years in Iraq

The following lists events that happened during 1982 in Iraq.

== Incumbents ==
- President: Saddam Hussein
- Prime Minister: Saddam Hussein
- Vice President: Taha Muhie-eldin Marouf

== Events ==
- April – Syria closes its oil pipeline with Iraq causing significant decrease in Iraqi oil exports.
- 24 May – Battle of Khorramshahr ends with Iranian forces retaking the city of Khorramshahr which had been captured by Iraqi forces earlier in the Iran-Iraq war.

== Deaths ==
- 23 September – Muzahim al-Pachachi, politician.(b.1918)
- 4 October – Ahmed Hassan al-Bakr, politician.(b.1914)
