= 1981 in Iraq =

- Decades: 1960s; 1970s; 1980s; 1990s; 2000s
- See also: Other events of 1981; List of years in Iraq

The following lists events that happened during 1981 in Iraq.

== Incumbents ==
- President: Saddam Hussein
- Prime Minister: Saddam Hussein
- Vice President: Taha Muhie-eldin Marouf

== Events ==
=== January ===
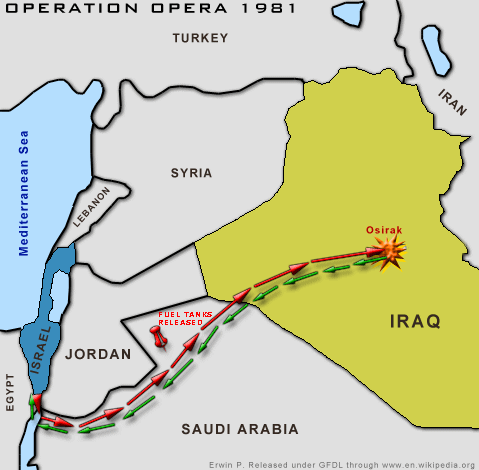
- Scheme of Operation Opera targeting Iraqi nuclear reactor
  5 January – For the first time since Iraq had invaded its territory in September, Iran launched a counterattack, concentrating its armies at Sousangerd. After 18 months, Iraqi forces had been driven out of Iran, which then began a drive toward capturing Iraqi territory. The war would continue until 1988.

=== June ===
- 7 June – Israel bombs the nearly completed but not operational Iraqi nuclear reactor 18 miles south of Baghdad in an operation known as Operation Opera. It was the world's first attack on a nuclear plant.

== Deaths ==
- 25 June – Saleh Yousefi Kurdish politician.(b.1918)

=== Date unknown ===
- Nureddin Mahmud – Politician and military commander.(b.1889)
