= Soheir =

Soheir, Soher, Suhair, or Suhayr is a feminine given name of Arabic origin. Notable people with the name include:

== Given name ==
=== Soheir ===
- Soheir Bakhoum (1947–2003), Egyptian-French numismatist
- Soheir Khashoggi (born 1947), Saudi Arabian writer
- Soheir Ramzi (born 1950), Egyptian actress
- Soheir Zaki (1945–2026), Egyptian belly dancer and actress

=== Soher ===
- Soher Al Bably (1937–2021), Egyptian actress
- Soher El Sukaria (born 1975), Lebanese-born Argentine politician

=== Suhair ===
- Suhair Batook (born 2006), Saudi footballer
- Suhair al-Qaisi (born 1985), Iraqi news anchor
- Suhair Vadakkepeedika (born 1992), Indian footballer
- Lisa Suhair Majaj (born 1960), Palestinian-American poet

=== Suhayr ===
- Suhayr al-Qalamawi (1911–1997), Egyptian writer
