= Mohammad Iqbal Omar =

Iraqi politician

Mohammad Iqbal Omar Al Saydali محمد إقبال عمر الصيدلي

Iraqi Minister of Education
- In office 2014–2018

Personal details
- Born: 28 January 1972 (age 53); Mosul, Iraq
- Profession: politician

Mohammad Iqbal Omar Al Saydali (Arabic: محمد إقبال عمر الصيدلي) (born 28 January 1972) is an Iraqi politician, formerly Iraq's education minister, was born 28 January 1972, in the northern Iraqi city of Mosul.

== Certificates ==
- "issest.prof" Date obtained: 1 September 2008 "University: Mosul College": Basic Education Department: Education.
- Certificate of Mastery in 1999: Specialization: Arts in Education / University of Baghdad Faculty of Education / Department of Educational and Psychological Sciences.
- Distinguished on the certificate of the degree of excellence (first) in 2004: Specialization: Philosophy in Education / University of Baghdad Faculty of Education / Department of Educational and Psychological Sciences.

== Career progression ==
- Professor of the Faculty of Basic Education / University of Mosul 3 December 2000 – now.
- Activities of faculty members at the college / university / other level. Membership of committees in the college.
- Chairman of Scientific Committee in the Department of Education.
- Course of Education Department.
- Member of the Graduate Studies Committee at the College.
- Representative of Teachers Syndicate in the College.
- Representative of teachers in the College Council.
- Member of the reconstruction committee at the college.
- Member of the Disciplinary Committee at the College.
- Member of the examination committee in the department.
- Member of Teachers Syndicate.
- Founding member of the Association of University Teachers.
