= Zaki al-Sarraf =

Iraqi poet and journalist (1932–1996)

- زكي الصراف
- Born: 1932; Karbala, Kingdom of Iraq
- Died: 11 March 1996 (aged 63–64); London, England
- Education: University of Baghdad (BA); Alexandria University (MA); Ain Shams University (PhD)

Zaki Abd al-Husayn Bedget al-Asadi (Arabic: زكي عبد الحسين بدقت الأسدي; 1932 – March 11, 1996), better known as Zaki al-Sarraf, was an Iraqi journalist and poet. He was a leading figure in both Arabic and Persian literature.

== Family ==
al-Sarraf hails from the prominent literary Bedget family of the Asad tribe. His ancestors settled in Karbala more than a thousand years ago, before the battle of Karbala, and had the honour of serving in the Imam Husayn and al-Abbas shrines', as well as holding custodianship of the two shrines.

al-Sarraf's great ancestor, Mehdi al-Asadi, was a renowned poet, and upon performing one of his pieces of poetry, instead of saying bezeghet (Arabic: بزغت), he made a speech error, and said bedeqet (Arabic: بدقت), and because of that incident, he became known as Haaj Mehdi Bedget. al-Sarraf's great uncle, Jawad Bedget (1795–1864) was a prominent poet, and one of the literary leaders of his time, especially praised for his skill in turning out quick responses. His uncle, Mashkoor al-Asadi, was also a renowned journalist, and laureate.

His surname al-Sarraf (Arabic: الصرّاف) was derived from his father's job, which was a money changer. His lineage is as follows:

Zakī bin ʿAbd al-Ḥusayn bin Mehdi bin Ḥammoud bin Muḥammad-Ḥusayn bin ʿAbd al-Nabī bin Mehdī (Bedget) bin Sāleḥ bin ʿAlī bin [leading to] Asad bin Khuzayma bin Mudrika bin Ilyās bin Mudhar bin Nizār bin Maʿad bin ʿAdnān.

== Early life and education ==
al-Sarraf was born in 1932, in Karbala, the son of Abd al-Husayn al-Sarraf, a merchant who owned a bureau de change. He had two brothers, one of them was a medical doctor. al-Sarraf lived a comfortable life and in one of the incidents of his childhood, al-Sarraf's wife narrates:

When my husband [al-Sarraf] was a young child, as Iraqi's normally do in the summer, when it gets hot, they sleep on the rooftops of their homes. During one of those nights, he noticed the moon in the sky, and began crying and demanded the moon. His parents couldn't get him to stop crying, so his [maternal] uncle, brought him a mirror and placed it in his lap, and showed him the moon in the reflection and told him: Here you go, the moon is now in your lap. It was then Zaki [al-Sarraf] was comforted, and slept.

As a child, al-Sarraf would often accompany his father on his business trips to Iran. So much so that, al-Sarraf eventually picked up the Persian language, and through this, he went as far as to become fluent in the language, study it, and write books and prose in Persian.

=== Education ===
He grew up in Karbala, and completed both elementary and high school there. He then went to Baghdad for university, and graduated with a bachelor's degree in Arabic literature from the University of Baghdad. In 1962, he travelled to Iran to study Persian literature at the University of Tehran, but due to clashes with an Israeli student, he did not complete his studies and travelled to Egypt to achieve his masters (on Fakhr-al-Din Iraqi) from the University of Alexandria. He earned his doctorate (Journalism in modern Persian literature) from the University of Ain Shams in 1972. In 1978, he took sabbatical leave to carry out a study at Oxford University, on the life of Rumi.

== Career ==
After graduating from university, al-Sarraf began to teach in a high school in Baghdad. He also worked in journalism, starting as an editor at the al-Hatif magazine, that was issued by prominent Iraqi writer, Jafar al-Khalili. al-Sarraf was the first Iraqi journalist to hold an interview with Iranian revolutionary, Navvab Safavi, when he was in Baghdad. He then did reporting at a Lebanese magazine called al-Adib, that was issued by Lebanese laureate, Albert Adib. He also worked at two other magazines, also Lebanese, al-Adaab and Egyptian, al-Kaatib, where he produced many articles and interviews. Between 1967 and 1972, he worked at the Council of Arab Economic Unity in Cairo. He then returned to Iraq after completing his doctorate, and began teaching at the University of Baghdad, in the Eastern Languages department. In 1980, al-Sarraf's health deteriorated, and so he travelled to London to seek treatment. However, not long after his arrival, the Iran-Iraq war set off, rendering it difficult for al-Sarraf to return home. So he remained in the United Kingdom, and had to resign from the university.

Whilst in London, al-Sarraf continued his literary activities, writing articles, books, prose, and poetry. He always dreamt of returning to Iraq, where the Baath was no more, and wrote poetry criticising Saddam Hussein:

يَا أَيُّهَا المُتَجَبِّرُ الطَاغِي الذِي
لَمْ يَبْقِ مِنْ دَارٍ وَلَا دِيَارِ
فَتَجَسَدَتْ فِيكَ المَظَاِلمِ كُلَهَا
وَتَمَثلْتَ مَا فِيكَ مِنْ اَوْزَارِ
مَا زَالَ فِي سَمْعِ الدُجَى أنَاتُ مَنْ
أفْنَيْتَهُم بِـ حَلَبْجَةَ الابْرَارِ
بِالغَازِ اَفْنَيْتَ الجَمِيعَ وَلَمْ تَدَعْ
شَيْخَاً وَلَا مِنْ نِسْوَةً وَصِغَارِ

Translation:

O' arrogant tyrant who,
never left a house or household safe.
You personified all oppression,
and personified all tribulations.
In the ears remain, the voices of,
all those you exterminated in the honourable Halabja
With gas you exterminated all, and never left,
the old, the women nor the children.

Then when Saddam started the Gulf War, al-Sarraf wrote:

(أُمُّ الكَوَاَرِثِ) لَمْ تَدَعْ شَيْئاً سِوَى
اِطْلَالَ اَرضِ خَرَائِبٍ وَبَوَارِ
وَفَخَرْتَ لَا بِالعِلْمِ يَنْشُرُ فِي الحَي
بَل بِالسِلَاحِ وجَيْشُكَ الجَرَّارِ
ِلمَن الجيُوشَ تَعُدّهَا؟ لِلْقُدْسِ؟ لَا
لِبَنِي العُرُوبَةِ سَقَتْهَا والجَارِ
أمِن المُرُوءَةِ اَنْ تُقَاتِلَ أُخْوَةٌ
فِي الدِينِ والتَارِيخِ؟ يَا للعَارِ

Translation:

(Mother of tragedies), you did not leave anything but,
a desecrated land and slum.
You pride yourself, not with spreading knowledge,
but with artillery and your grand army.
Who are you preparing the army for? Jerusalem? No!
For the sons of the Arabs and your neighbours.
Is it bravery to you fight your brothers,
in faith and history? What a shame.

== Personal life and death ==
al-Sarraf was married and had one son, Qusay and one daughter, Nihal. He died on 11 March 1996 in his home in London.

In Karbala, a community library named the Sayyid al-Shuhada Library was established through donations of books and financial contributions from local supporters. Al-Sarraf was among those who donated books to the library's collection.

== Works ==
- Layali al-Shabab (Nights of the Youth – Poetry Collection)
- Abdullah bin al-Muqafa' (Abdallah Ibn al-Muqaffa')
- Hareeq Maktabat al-Iskandariya (The Fire of Alexandria)
- Wijhat al-Adab Fi Iran (The Face of Literature in Iran)
- Karbala FI Uyoon al-Rahala al-Gharbiyin (Karbala in the eyes of Western travellers)
