= Sama Dizayee =

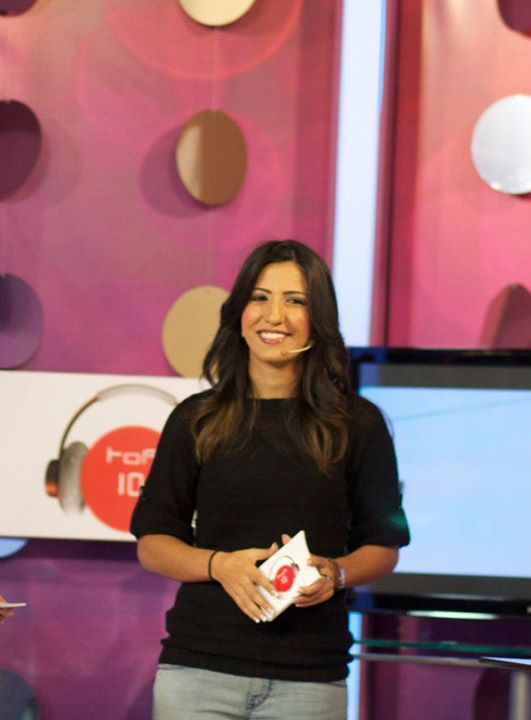
- Sama Dizayee live on Top 10 Show on Alsumaria TV Satellite Channel
- Born: Sama Ezzulddin Ameen Dizayee; 2 June 1988 (age 37); Baghdad, Iraq
- Occupation(s): Multimedia journalist, reporter, political analyst, writer
- Years active: 2005-present

Sama Ameen Dizayee (born 2 June 1988) is an Iraqi Kurdish radio and television personality.

Dizayee was born and raised in Baghdad. She studied computer sciences in Erbil till late 2009 and later moved to the United States to pursue her studies in political science.

== Early life ==
Dizayee began her career in media at the age of 15 when she became a radio host for the online radio station, VOY FM (Voice of Youth), and later a producer. She later became the main radio host and producer for other online radios; Marina FM, Shabab FM and Iraq FM. At 17, she started writing for the first English newspaper in Erbil, Kurdistan "The Kurdish Globe," while also writing for the local student magazine Ozone.

After a while Dizayee started working for the first English-language radio station Zed Radio, a part of Zagros Satellite Channel, in Kurdistan, Northern Iraq where she hosted and produced her shows in English and Kurdish.

== Professional background ==
Dizayee is currently working as a journalist covering feature stories and international politics in Washington, DC.

In Lebanon, Dizayee was one of the few Iraqi Kurdish faces of Al Sumaria TV Satellite channel. Al Sumaria is known as one of the leading Iraqi satellite channels in Iraq, broadcasting from multiple studios in the Arab countries, with millions of viewers from more than 86 countries. Al-Sumaria was ranked Iraq's #1 Satellite Channel in 2012.

She hosted Al-Sumaria's #1 Ramadan show "Majina Ya Majina" directed by Walid Melki. She and her colleagues won the award for "Best Ramadan Quiz Show" in 2011 from the Iraqi Minister of Culture.

She also presented the Arabic charts show "Top 10" on Al-Sumaria with co-anchor and Iraqi singer Bassam Mahdi broadcasting live from Al Sumaria studios in Lebanon.

== International contributions ==
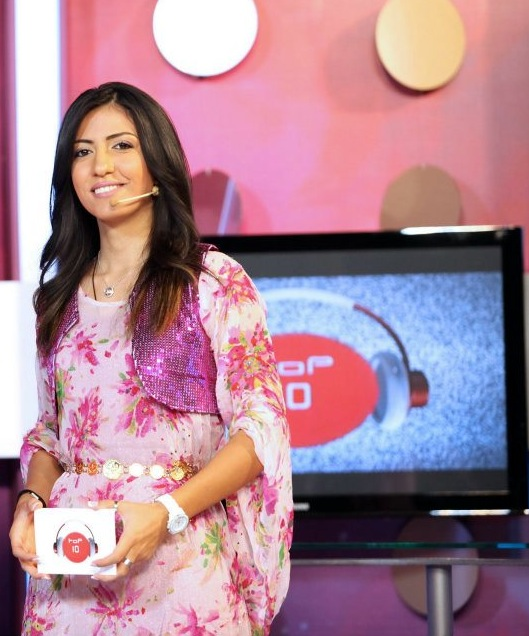
Sama Dizayee wearing the Kurdish traditional costume on her weekly TV show Top 10 on Al Sumaria TV Satellite Channe

Dizayee comes from a politically active family in the region. She graduated with a degree in Political Science and International Relations, aspiring to pursue a political career in Kurdistan. Currently, she is reporting on international, Iraqi, and Kurdish politics, contributing as a political analyst and writer on national and international news publications including Voice of America, Associated Press (AP), BBC World Service, BBC World News, and The Kurdish Globe (National Newspaper).
