= Aya Mansour =

Iraqi poet, writer, and journalist

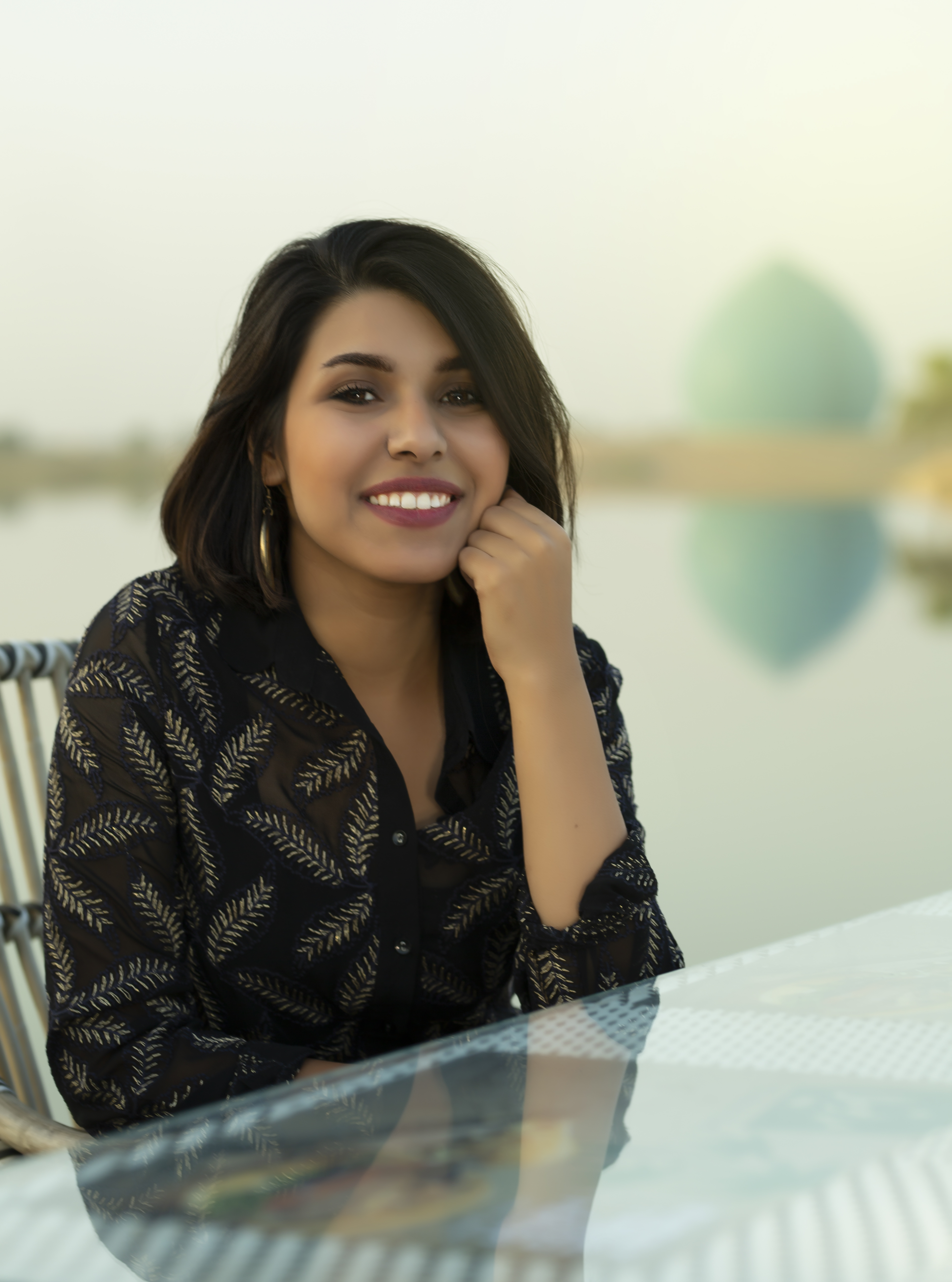
- Born: November 11, 1992; Baghdad, Iraq
- Education: Institute of preparation parameters
- Website: ayamansour.net

Aya Mansoor (Arabic: آية منصور born November 11, 1992), is an Iraqi poet, writer, and journalist. She published four books: Fingers' Forest, Alone She Sings, Alice in Baghdad, and Sunny Picture, and a play called Invisible. She also written many articles in different newspapers and magazines such as Al-Jazeera Net, Iraqi Network Magazine, Al-Sabah Iraqi Journalist, and Yalla news website.

== Early life ==
Born (November 11, 1992) in Baghdad, she graduated from Teachers' Institute in 2012 with a degree in mathematics. She started publishing her writings on social media websites in 2009. In 2014 Al-Arabiya published her first book, collecting all her poems.

== Career in journalism and media ==
She worked in Iraqi Network Magazine/Al-Iraqiya channel since 2016, she wrote many weekly bits including:

- Investigation of the Week: a weekly article that is published on the sixth page of every issue of Iraqi Network Magazine
- A series of reports about the libraries of Iraq: A weekly paragraph that is published on the 34th page of the same magazine
- Fingerprint: A series of articles about famous Iraqi people that have achievements, published in the website of Iraqi Network Magazine.
  - Producing and presenting short videos on Yalla news website
  - A bit "Make Your Life Right" presented from 2017 to 2018

== Journalism ==
- Al-Sabah Al-Iraqiya: "Female Ink": A weekly column (2016–2017)
- Al-Alam Al-Jadeed Iraqi Newspaper: Varied articles and columns (2015)
- Al-Alam Iraqi Newspaper: Varied articles and columns (2019)
- Al-Magharib Lebanese Website: Editor (2015–2016)
- Kutub Egyptian Website: Editor of cultural articles (2015–2016)
- Shabab Al-Safeer Website

== Publications ==
- Fingers' Forest: A poetry collection published by Al-Arabiya for Sciences, 2014
- Alone She Sings: Poetry collection published by Sutoor for Publishing and Distribution, 2017 (ISBN 9781773222202), it was translated to French and published by Editions des Lisières as "Seule elle chante" (ISBN 979-10-96274-08-6)
- Alice in Baghdad: An entertaining, educational story about Baghdad areas published by Farashat For Kids, 2017
- Sunny Picture: Collected stories published by Sutoor for publishing and distribution, 2019
- Invisible (Play): A theatrical play about Iraqi women (As part of Darboona project about the challenges Iraqi women face in this community), it was performed in the Academy of Arts in Berlin, Germany, 2016

== Lectures, seminars and poetry evenings ==
=== Poetry evenings and seminars ===
- Baghdad, 2013–2017
- Lebanon, 2016
- Egypt, 2017
- Oman, 2017
- France, 2019

=== Seminars about writing and poetry ===
- American University in Suleimania, 2014
- University of Lyon, France, 2019
- University of Nice, France, 2019

=== Theatrical plays ===
- With actress Judy Morris and singer Leo Ebirto, in the national theatre of Besançon, France

=== Lectures about writing ===
- Istanbul Shaheer University, Turkey, 2019

== Awards and certificates ==
- Iraqi National Journalism Syndicate Award 2019
- Certificate from the Carnival of World Peace Day by Peace Makers, Iraq, 2014
- Distinguish and Creativity shield from Baghdad International Expo, 2019
- Creativity award by Ahlamy event by Volunteers for Iraq Organization, 2015
- Shield of Success, awarded for talking at "I talk", by the leading youth forum in Istanbul, 2019
