= Zainab Al-Eqabi =

Iraqi para-athlete and television presenter

- زينب العقابي
- Born: August 19, 1990 (age 36); Baghdad, Baghdad Governorate, Iraq
- Education: University of Sharjah; University of Durham
- Occupations: Pharmacist; para-athlete; television presenter

Zainab Al-Eqabi (Arabic: زينب العقابي; born 19 August 1990) is an Iraqi pharmacist, para-athlete and television presenter based in the United Arab Emirates. An above-the-knee leg amputee, she is an advocate for the rights of disabled people, particularly those living in the Middle East.

== Personal life ==
Al-Eqabi was born and raised in Baghdad. In June 1997, she was severely wounded after an undetonated bomb dating back to the Gulf War exploded in her family's garden. Al-Eqabi sustained injuries to her hand and leg, the latter of which was later amputated after it became infected with gangrene; her father lost a hand as a result of the explosion, while her sister lost a finger. Al-Eqabi and her family subsequently emigrated to the United Arab Emirates in 2001, and she went on to graduate from the University of Sharjah with a degree in pharmacy in 2013. In 2017, Al-Eqabi completed postgraduate studies in International Social Work at Durham University in the United Kingdom.

Al-Eqabi currently lives in Dubai.

== Career ==
Al-Eqabi first received media attention after established a Facebook group entitled "Disabled and Proud" in response to what she felt was a stigma against disabled people throughout the Middle East. In 2011, Al-Eqabi was advised to take up swimming to alleviate back pain she was experiencing due to her prosthetic leg. As an athlete, she has completed two triathlons in the United Arab Emirates and received press attention when she trained to become a scuba diver in 2016. She subsequently received further public recognition when she completed the 2020 Dubai Fitness Challenge, which included hauling a Jeep.

Al-Eqabi has over a million followers on Instagram and 600,000 subscribers on YouTube.

Al-Eqabi is a brand ambassador for the prosthetics manufacturer Ottobock. She was the first woman from the Middle East to serve in such a role.

Al-Eqabi became the first amputee television host in the Middle East after appearing on the MBC1 show Yalla Banat. The show discusses issues facing young people in the Middle East and North Africa and how these can be resolved.

== Recognition ==
In July 2021, Al-Eqabi, alongside fellow amputees Dareen Barbar and Rania Hammad, were featured on the cover of Vogue Arabia.

In 2021, Al-Eqabi was named as a regional face of The Body Shop's Global Self-Love Movement campaign.

Al-Eqabi featured in Nike's 2020 Victory Swim marketing campaign, alongside Maha Al-Ameri and Manal Rostom.

Al-Eqabi has an ongoing ambassadorship for Nike since November 2021.

Al-Eqabi walked Milan Fashion Week for BOSS in September 2022.

Al-Eqabi was signed to become Volkswagen Middle East brand ambassador for the year of 2023 and 2024
