= Karoj Sindi =

German footballer (born 1989)

Personal information
- Date of birth: 21 August 1989 (age 37)
- Place of birth: Zakho, Iraq
- Height: 1.73 m (5 ft 8 in)
- Position: Winger

Youth career
- MSV Duisburg
- Wuppertaler SV

Senior career*
Years	Team	Apps	(Gls)
2009–2010	Wuppertaler SV	1	(0)
2010	VfB Homberg	5	(0)
2011–2012	VVV-Venlo	0	(0)
2012–2013	Rot-Weiss Oberhausen	20	(1)
2013	Rot-Weiß Oberhausen II	13	(3)
2014	Duhok SC		
2014–2015	1. FC Bocholt	11	(0)
2015	Wuppertaler SV	15	(2)
2015–2016	TuS Erndtebrück	8	(0)
2016	Germania Ratingen 04/19	9	(0)
2016–2018	Nuol FC		
2018	TV Herkenrath 09	7	(0)
2019	FSV Duisburg	7	(0)
2020	Wuppertaler SV	2	(0)
2021–2022	FSV Duisburg	14	(1)

International career
- Iraq U19
- Iraq U20
- * Club domestic league appearances and goals as of 09:36, 28 September 2022 (UTC)

Karoj Sindi (born 21 August 1989) is an Iraqi footballer who most recently played as a winger for FSV Duisburg. At international level, he played for the Iraq U19 and Iraq U20.

== Club career ==
Sindi was born in Zakho, Iraq. He moved to Germany when he was two years old and grew up in Duisburg.

He played youth football for MSV Duisburg and Wuppertaler SV and made his senior debut with Wuppertaler SV in the 3. Liga, playing 70 minutes of a match against Carl Zeiss Jena.

Sindi joined NRW-Liga club VfB Homberg from Wuppertaler SV in summer 2010. In November, having made five substitute appearances for the club, he agreed the termination of his contract.

After his stint at VfB Homberg he played for the reserves of Eredivisie club VVV-Venlo.

In summer 2012 Sindi signed with Regionalliga West side Rot-Weiss Oberhausen. After the first half of the season, during which he made 20 appearances scoring one goal and making two assists and was noted for missing goalscoring opportunities, he was demoted to the club's reserves by coach Peter Kunkel. He was released in summer 2013.

In February 2014, after months of searching for a new club, Sindi joined Iraqi Premier League club Duhok SC on a contract until the end of the season.

He agreed the termination of his contract with Oberliga Niederrhein side 1. FC Bocholt in January 2015.

In January 2016, having left Regionalliga West club TuS Erndtebrück, he joined Germania Ratingen 04/19 of the Oberliga Niederrhein.

In summer 2016 Sindi signed with Lao Premier League club Nuol FC in Laos, where he stayed for two years. He took part in the Wiederentdeckt project, a casting show for footballers wanting to become professionals.

In the first half of the 2018–19 season, Sindi made seven appearances for TV Herkenrath 09 in the Regionalliga West. He moved to Oberliga Niederrhein side FSV Duisburg in January 2019.

Sindi joined Wuppertaler SV for a third time in January 2020 and made an assist on his debut in a 3–1 win against VfB Homberg in the Regionalliga West.

== International career ==
Sindi played youth international football for the Iraq U19 and Iraq U20 national teams. He also made an appearance for the senior national team in an unofficial friendly. In 2012 he stated he would no longer accept call-ups.

== Style of play ==
A winger, Sindi's is known for his pace and his dribbling abilities. He has been compared to former Germany international David Odonkor.

== Personal life ==
Sindi also has a German passport.
