= Hawbir Mustafa =

Iraqi-Dutch footballer

Personal information
- Date of birth: 23 September 1993 (age 33)
- Place of birth: Sulaymaniyah, Iraq
- Height: 1.73 m (5 ft 8 in)
- Position: Full back

Youth career
- RKVCL
- MVV Maastricht

Senior career*
| Years | Team | Apps | (Gls) |
| 2011–2017 | MVV Maastricht | 100 | (0) |
| 2017–2018 | KFC Oosterzonen | 4 | (0) |
| 2018–2019 | MVV Maastricht | 19 | (0) |
| 2019–2020 | Spouwen-Mopertingen | | |

International career^{‡}
| 2016 | Iraq U23 | 0 | (0) |
| 2014 | Iraq | 1 | (0) |
- * Club domestic league appearances and goals ‡ National team caps and goals as of 24 May 2019

Hawbir Mustafa (Arabic: هوبير مصطفى; born 24 September 1993) is an Iraqi professional footballer and an Olympian who plays as a full back.

== Career ==
Born in Sulaymaniyah, Iraq, Hawbir Mustafa made his senior debut for MVV Maastricht in the 2011–12 season.

His first name Hawbir means “always in the mind” in Kurdish. With Iraq under UN sanctions and the region in turmoil, Hawbir's father left for the Netherlands in 1997 and three years later, six-year-old Hawbir and his mother followed. They lived in refugee centers in Leiden, Eindhoven and Venlo before settling in the city of Maastricht, where Hawbir's brother Hawsang “everything is equal” was born. To keep the young Hawbir preoccupied, he would have the ball at his feet on the street and football helped him make friends. A coach at the local football club RKVCL noticed his abilities near the club's complex and as the player recalls, the coach “literally forced” him to train. Not long after MVV signed him and at just 17, the club's head coach René Trost gave the fast and agile full back his debut. At the time the player's papers were not in order however he was given a reprieve by staying on as a player on an amateur basis and has made nearly 100 appearances for “Us MVV’ke” in the Jupiler League since making his debut in 2011 and had been a club regular for two seasons.

In late 2014 Hawbir received a surprise call-up from the Iraq FA and despite possessing no valid Iraqi passport, he made his debut against Yemen in an international friendly in Manama. He played 55 minutes in a 1–1 draw.
