= Suhair al-Qaisi =

Iraqi presenter (born 1985)

Suhair al-Qaisi سهير القيسي
- Born: Suhair Ibrahim al-Qaisi; 31 May 1985 (age 40); Baghdad, Iraq
- Occupation(s): TV Presenter, Journalist

Souhair Ibrahim Al-Qayssei (Arabic: سهير إبراهيم القيسي) (born 31 May 1985 in Baghdad) is a senior news anchor with the pan-Arab Middle East Broadcasting Center Group (MBC) presenting prime-time news for MBC1. Al-Qayssei who studied dentistry is one of the leading journalists and television personalities in the Middle East. She was also a news anchor and presenter with Al Arabiya news from 2004 to 2014 and was chosen in 2008 by Fox News as among the 10 most important personalities in Iraq.

In January 2016, Al-Qayssei was officially appointed as a Celebrity Partner to Iraq by the United Nations' World Food Programme (WFP). In her new role she supports WFP's work in providing food assistance to conflict-affected families and internally displaced people. The surge in violence in Iraq has left over 3.2 million Iraqis displaced and in need of food assistance.
