= Taha Yassin Ramadan =

7th vice president of Iraq

- طه ياسين رمضان
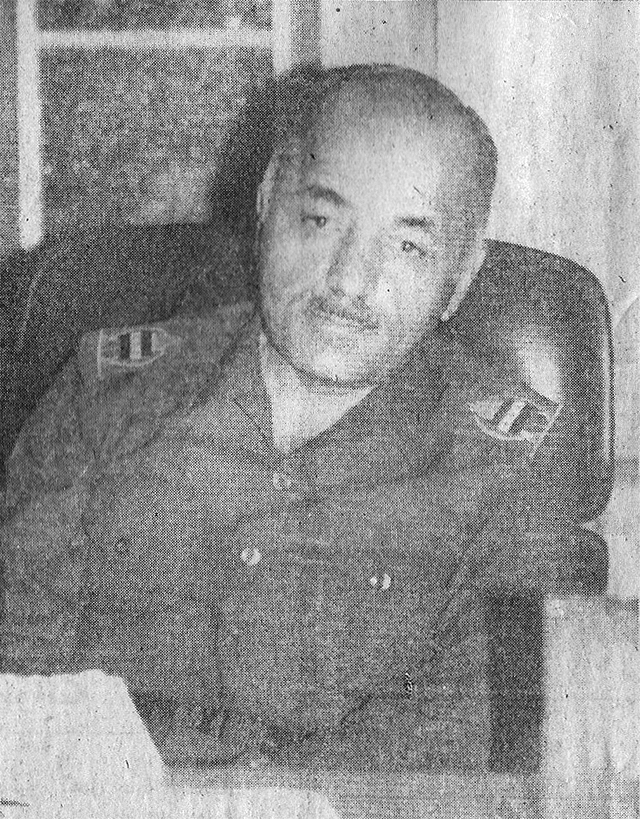
- Ramadan on 14 November 1988

Vice President of Iraq
- In office March 1991 – 9 April 2003 Serving with Taha Muhie-eldin Marouf and Izzat Ibrahim al-Douri
- President: Saddam Hussein
- Preceded by: Izzat Ibrahim al-Douri
- Succeeded by: Ibrahim Jaafari and Roj Shaweis

Head of the Popular Army
- In office 1974–1991

Deputy Secretary of the Regional Command of the Iraqi Regional Branch
- In office 16 July 1979 – September 1991
- Preceded by: Saddam Hussein
- Succeeded by: Izzat Ibrahim al-Douri

Member of the Regional Command of the Iraqi Regional Branch
- In office October 1966 – 9 April 2003

Personal details
- Born: 20 February 1938 Mosul, Iraq
- Died: 20 March 2007 (aged 69) Baghdad, Iraq
- Cause of death: Execution by hanging
- Party: Iraqi Regional Branch of the Arab Socialist Ba'ath Party

Taha Yassin Ramadan al-Jazrawi (Arabic: طه ياسين رمضان الجزراوي; c. 1938 – 20 March 2007) was an Iraqi military officer and politician who served as the vice president of Iraq from March 1991 to the fall of Saddam Hussein in April 2003 and the commander of the Popular Army.

He is often referred to as "the difficult man" and "the man of major missions." Known for his serious demeanor and deep knowledge of Iraqi-Soviet relations, he has played a significant role in Iraq's leadership.

== Early life ==
Ramadan was born sometime between 1936 and 1938 to a peasant family in Mosul. His family categorically denied Kurdish origin and his son explained that Western news agencies had made an error due to the fact that Iraqi President Saddam Hussein had two vice presidents: one representing Kurds, Taha Muhi al-Din Ma’rouf and the other vice president representing Arabs. He grew up in Mosul until he obtained his high school diploma. Ramadan graduated from the Military College and initially retired from service in 1959.

== Formative career ==
He returned to the military following the events of February 8, 1963, but retired again in 1964 and spent two years under house arrest. Subsequently, he was elected as a member of the regional leadership of the Iraqi Ba'ath Party.

After the 17 July Revolution of 1968, he was reinstated in the army and became a member of the Revolutionary Command Council in November 1969. In early 1970, he presided over a special court that tried "enemies of the revolution." By March 1970, he was appointed Minister of Industry, a role he held until becoming Minister of Housing in 1976.

Ramadan also served as the commander of the Iraqi Popular Army, a militia aligned with the Ba'ath Party. In early 1974, he was re-elected to the Ba'ath Party's regional leadership and acted as Minister of Planning from November 1974 to May 1976. By 1977, he was elected to the National Command of the Ba'ath Party.

Ramadan provided insight into the People’s Army, a key component of Iraq’s defense strategy. He explained that while the People’s Army, with around 600,000 trained members, was a reserve force, it was not a regular military unit. Its primary role was to support the regular army and maintain the home front. Ramadan stated that the People's Army was a militia with a unique training regime and was integrated into the national defense under the leadership of the regular army. The personnel of the People’s Army participated in front-line duties based on military leadership's guidance.

Regarding the potential for peace, Ramadan reiterated Iraq's readiness for negotiations based on international norms, historical borders, and non-interference in internal affairs. However, he maintained that the Iranian conditions for ending the war were unacceptable, as they amounted to a breach of Iraq’s sovereignty.

== Deputy Prime Minister ==
On July 16, 1979, following Saddam Hussein's rise to the presidency, Ramadan was appointed First Deputy Prime Minister. This position enabled him to oversee the activities of various ministries and state institutions, as well as undertake visits to Western European countries and the former Soviet Union.

=== Iran–Iraq War ===
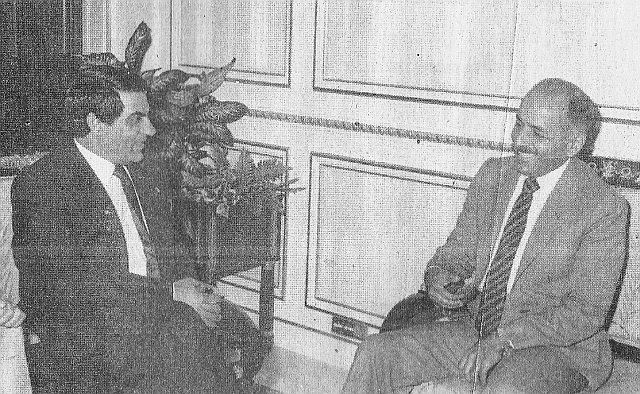
Taha Yassin Ramadan with Ben Ali of Tunisia, 1988

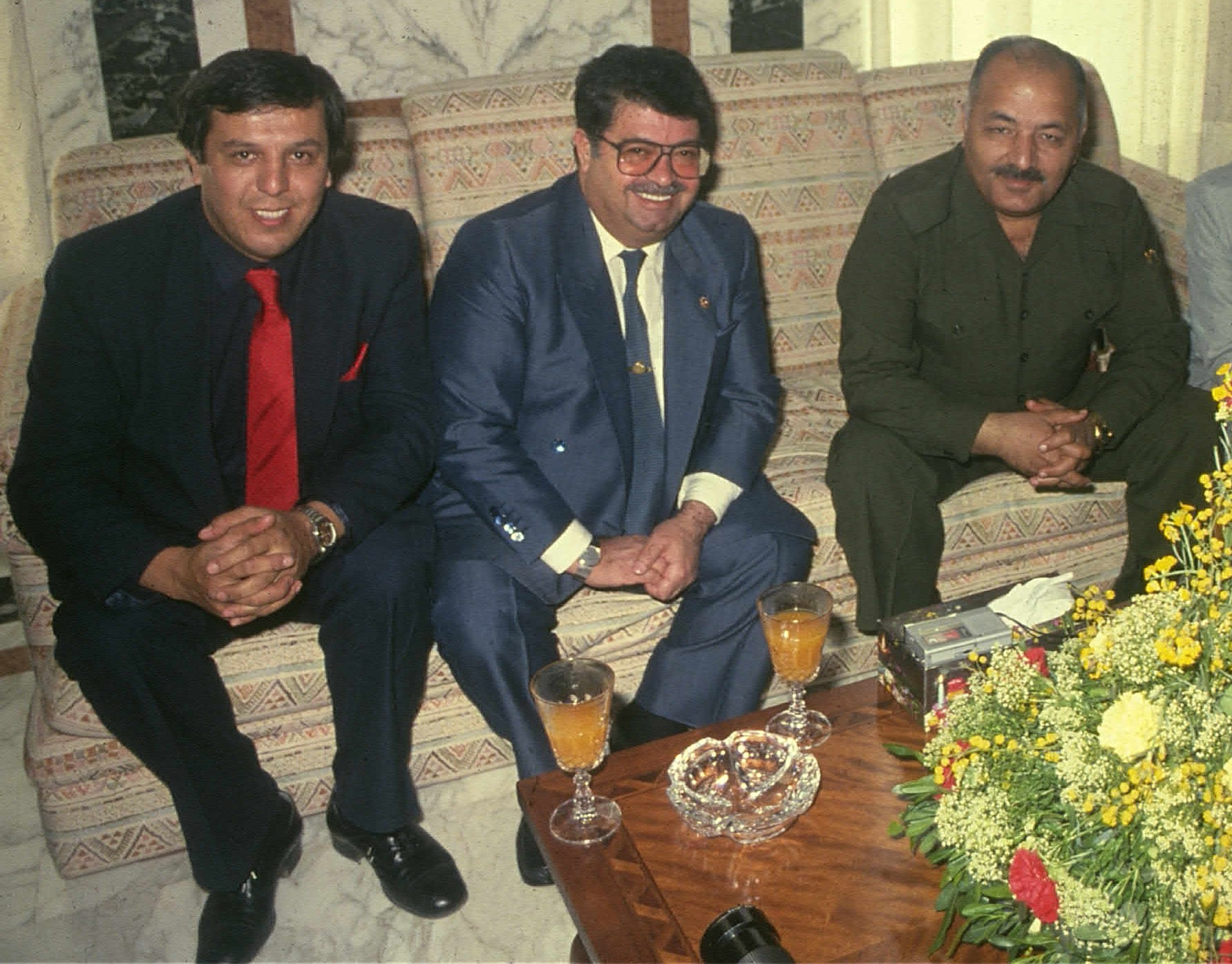
Turkish Prime Minister Turgut Özal with Ramadan in Baghdad, 1984

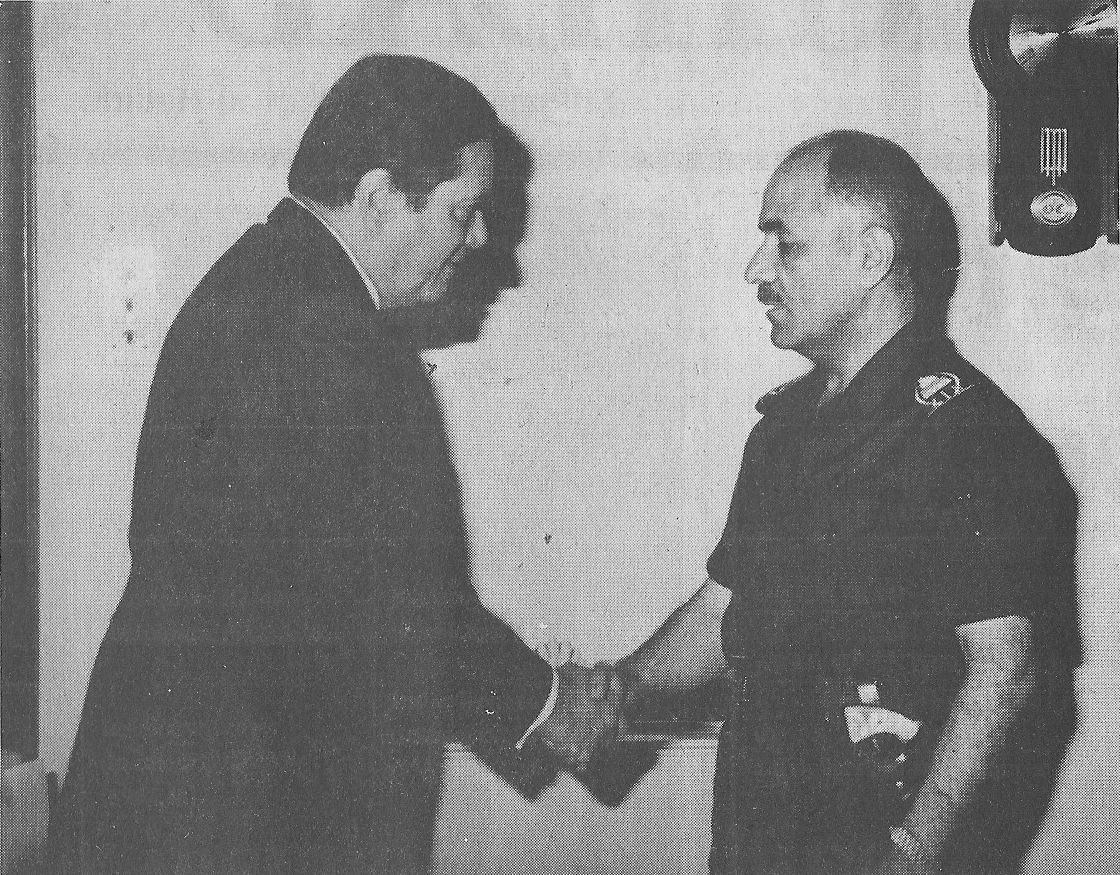
Ramadan receiving the Brazilian Deputy Foreign Minister Paulo Tarso Flecha de Lima, 1988

During the interview, Ramadan was asked about the broader Arab context of the Iran-Iraq war. He stated that in the early years of the war, some Arab parties used the conflict as a cover for their own issues, claiming that Iraq’s involvement was a distraction from the real battle – the defense of Palestine. Ramadan emphasized that Iraq’s defense of its sovereignty, especially in Basra and the Shatt al-Arab region, was critical, as those territories were central to Iraq's survival. He pointed out that the reluctance of some Arab countries to fully support Iraq in its struggle against Iran was part of a broader Arab disunity that was weakening the region.

He expressed disappointment with certain Arab states that failed to take decisive or supportive stances, criticizing their inability to act when Iraq was under direct threat. Ramadan lamented the "silent spectator" role many Arab countries took during the war, reflecting what he described as a painful and fragmented Arab political landscape. According to Ramadan, had the Arab countries shown more unity and determination, the war might not have prolonged as it did.

When asked whether the continuation of the war was driven by military or political decisions, Ramadan acknowledged that although Iran had indicated a desire to invade Iraq, the conflict had not yet reached a decisive point. He argued that while Iraq’s military strength was formidable, the Arab situation, international interests, and the Iranian stance made it difficult to resolve the war. He stressed that Iraq was committed to defending its land but had no intention of invading Iranian territory. Peace, he suggested, could only become a reality if Iran was willing to engage in meaningful negotiations.

Finally, when questioned about reports of Iranian prisoners of war, Ramadan stated that he did not have official statistics on the number of prisoners. He denied the existence of civilian prisoners, although he invited further inquiries from The Economist.

=== Economy and social impact during war ===
On the topic of Iraq's economic situation during the war, Ramadan rejected claims that the country was facing a financial crisis. He acknowledged that the war had strained Iraq’s resources but argued that Iraq’s economy was structurally solid. Iraq had managed to navigate the challenges of war without significant disruption to its internal economic stability. Ramadan pointed out that, despite the war, Iraq had continued to build and maintain its infrastructure, with citizens generally not feeling the war's effects as strongly as those in other nations involved in shorter conflicts. He refuted claims that Iraq’s economic difficulties were due to war, stating that the situation was more about monetary adjustments and borrowing from various countries, which did not indicate an imbalance.

Ramadan emphasized that Iraq's economy was adapting and continuing to grow, despite challenges. He argued that the nation’s socialist approach, combined with its ability to maintain economic activity even during war, set it apart from other countries. He also noted that while citizens did feel some concern over scarcity, the overall economic health of the country remained strong.

In the interview, Ramadan was asked about the social consequences of the Iraq-Iran war, particularly concerning the impact on students and families. He dismissed the notion that university students were being unnecessarily sent to the front lines, claiming that the Iraqi government ensured students could finish their education before being called to serve. He acknowledged that the war had created some social issues, but he emphasized the government’s focus on keeping the public engaged and responsible for their own defense.

== Vice President ==
=== Foreign relations ===
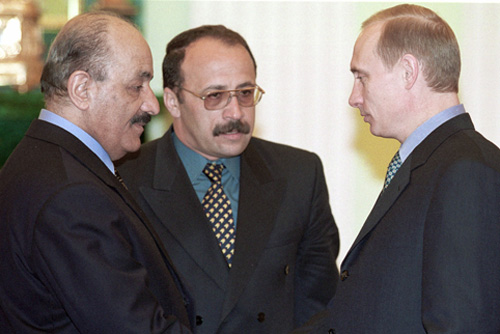
Russian president Vladimir Putin meeting with Iraqi vice president Taha Yassin Ramadan in 2001

Despite international pressure, he played a crucial role in strengthening Iraq's diplomatic and economic ties with several key nations. He led efforts to improve relations with Russia, India, Iran, Indonesia and neighboring countries, positioning Iraq as a more active player on the global stage. His outreach aimed at diversifying Iraq's alliances and reducing its dependence on Western powers, particularly amid ongoing tensions with the United States. In 2000, Ramadan made an official visit to India.

At the same time, according to Middle East analyst Amir Taheri, he was also involved in a "Mafia-style crime syndicate" that dominated Iraq's trade, particularly in dealings with France and Germany. This suggests that beyond official diplomatic efforts, he played a significant role in managing illicit networks that facilitated trade and imports, circumventing international sanctions.

In 2000 and 2001, he further expanded Iraq's economic partnerships by signing free trade agreements with countries such as Jordan, Egypt, and Syria. These agreements weakened U.S. efforts to isolate Iraq economically and politically, providing the country with alternative markets and trade routes despite ongoing sanctions. His ability to foster these alliances demonstrated a strategic push to counterbalance American influence in the region.

=== Proposed resolution to United States–Iraq conflict ===
In October 2002, four months before the United States invaded Iraq, Ramadan suggested U.S. President George W. Bush and Saddam Hussein settle their difference in a duel. He reasoned this would not only serve as an alternative to a war that was certain to damage Iraq's infrastructure, but that it would also reduce the suffering of the Iraqi and American peoples. Ramadan's offer included the possibility that a group of US officials would face off with a group of Iraqi officials of same or similar rank (President v. President, Vice President v. Vice President, etc.). Ramadan proposed that the duel be held in a neutral land, with each party using the same weapons, and with UN Secretary General Kofi Annan presiding as the supervisor. On behalf of Bush, White House Press Secretary Ari Fleischer declined the offer.

=== Later years ===
Ramadan endured multiple assassination attempts, surviving two in 1997 and another in 1999, highlighting the volatile nature of Iraqi politics and the threats he faced from both internal and external adversaries. Despite these dangers, his unwavering loyalty to Saddam Hussein ensured his continued presence in the upper echelons of power. However, this same loyalty also constrained him, preventing him from making an independent bid for absolute authority.

In his later years, his influence diminished as Saddam's sons, Uday Hussein and Qusay Hussein, consolidated their control, sidelining other key figures within the regime. While Ramadan remained a significant figure, he was ultimately overshadowed by the growing dominance of the Hussein family.

== Post-2003 ==
Following the fall of Saddam's government, Taha Yasin Ramadan was placed on the U.S. list of most-wanted Iraqis and depicted as the "Ten of Diamonds" in the US deck of most-wanted Iraqi playing cards. He was captured on August 19, 2003, in Mosul, by fighters of the Patriotic Union of Kurdistan (PUK) and handed over to US forces.

He was one of the defendants in the Iraq Special Tribunal's Al-Dujail trial. On 5 November 2006, he was sentenced to life imprisonment. On 26 December 2006, the appeals court sent the case file back to the Tribunal, saying the sentence was too lenient and demanding a death sentence.

== Execution ==
On 12 February 2007, he was sentenced to death by hanging. His sentence was carried out on the fourth anniversary of US invasion of Iraq, before dawn on 20 March 2007.

== See also ==
- Saddam Hussein
- Ibrahim Hesqel
