= Izzat Ibrahim al-Douri =

Iraqi politician and military officer (1942–2020)

Field Marshal Izzat Ibrahim al-Douri
- عزة إبراهيم الدوري
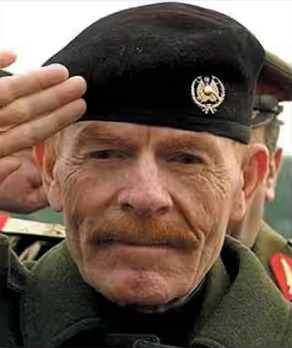
- al-Douri, c. 2003

Secretary General of the National Command of the Arab Socialist Ba'ath Party
- In office 30 December 2006 – 25 October 2020
- Preceded by: Saddam Hussein
- Succeeded by: Salah Al-Mukhtar

Regional Secretary of the Iraqi Ba'ath Party
- In office 3 January 2007 – 25 October 2020
- Preceded by: Saddam Hussein
- Succeeded by: Unknown (most likely Mohammed Younis al-Ahmed)

Deputy Secretary of the Regional Command of the Iraqi Regional Branch
- In office September 1991 – 3 January 2007
- Preceded by: Taha Yassin Ramadan
- Succeeded by: Unknown

Vice Chairman of the Revolutionary Command Council
- In office 16 July 1979 – 9 April 2003
- President: Saddam Hussein
- Preceded by: Saddam Hussein
- Succeeded by: Post abolished

Member of the Regional Command of the Iraqi Regional Branch
- In office October 1966 – 9 April 2003

Personal details
- Born: 1 July 1942 Ad-Dawr, Saladin, Kingdom of Iraq
- Died: 25 October 2020 (aged 78)
- Party: Iraqi Ba'ath
- Spouses: Sundus Abd Al-Ghafar; Jawhar Majid Al-Duri; Nidal Al-Rabi'i; Intissar Al-Ubaydi
- Children: Ahmed; Ibrahim; Ali; Suleiman; Hamd; Yusef; Khaled; Mustafa; Abbas; Omar; Hawazin; Abla; Amra
- Nickname: Ghost

Military service
- Allegiance: Iraqi Republic (1962–1968); Ba'athist Iraq (1968–2003); Naqshbandi Army
- Branch/service: Iraqi Ground Forces
- Years of service: 1962–2003
- Rank: Field marshal
- Unit: Political Guidance Directorate
- Commands: 2nd Infantry Division (1977–1981)
- Battles/wars: First Iraqi-Kurdish War; Iran–Iraq War; Al-Anfal Campaign; Gulf War; Battle of Khafji; 1991 uprisings in Iraq; Iraq War; US Invasion of Iraq; Iraqi insurgency (2003–2011); Iraqi civil war (2006–2008); Iraqi insurgency (2011–2013); 2013 Hawija clashes; War in Iraq (2013-17); Anbar campaign (2013–2014); Northern Iraq offensive; Salahuddin campaign; First Battle of Tikrit

Izzat Ibrahim al-Douri (Arabic: عزة إبراهيم الدوري, romanized: ʿIzzat Ibrāhīm ad-Dūrī; 1 July 1942 – 25 October 2020) was an Iraqi politician, military officer and field marshal. He served as Vice Chairman of the Iraqi Revolutionary Command Council until the 2003 invasion of Iraq by the United States and was regarded as the closest advisor and deputy under President Saddam Hussein. He led the Iraqi militant group Naqshbandi Army.

Al-Douri was the most high-profile Ba'athist official to successfully evade capture after the invasion of Iraq, and was the "king of clubs" in the infamous U.S. deck of most-wanted Iraqi playing cards. Al-Douri continued to lead elements of the Iraqi resistance such as the Naqshbandi Army against the then-occupation forces and waged an insurgency against the current regime in Baghdad. Following the execution of Saddam Hussein on 30 December 2006, al-Douri was confirmed as the new leader of the banned Iraqi Ba'ath Party on 3 January 2007.

In April 2015, the Shiite militant organization Asa'ib Ahl al-Haq claimed they had killed al-Douri and his nine bodyguards during a military operation near the Al-Alaas oil fields in Hemreen east of Tikrit. The group further alleged that his body had been transported to Baghdad to confirm its identity on 17 April 2015. Though the story was carried by the BBC, they also noted that the Iraqi Ba'ath party denied that al-Douri had died, while a Kurdish news source reported that Iraq did not have al-Douri's DNA to confirm his death. Al-Douri subsequently appeared in videos talking about events that took place after his supposed death. On 26 October 2020, news of his death was again carried by both local and international media, this time based on an announcement made a day earlier by the Iraqi Ba'ath Party, and a statement by Raghad Hussein, the daughter of Saddam Hussein.

== Biography ==
=== Early life ===
Born in 1942, al-Douri was born in Ad-Dawr, near the Iraqi town of Tikrit, to Ibrahim Khalil al-Douri, a farmer, and Hamdah Salim al-Douri. His family belonged to the Sunni Muslim Al-Shuwaikhat clan of the Jabour tribe. Nicknamed "the Iceman" for his humble origins selling blocks of ice, he became involved in revolutionary politics in his late teenage years, despite having had only a primary school education. He befriended Saddam Hussein in 1963, then they both served in the early intelligence apparatus of the Ba'ath Party and participated in what would be known as the 17 July Revolution in 1968.

=== During the Ba'athist government ===
Al-Douri was a senior member of the Ba'athist government under Saddam Hussein. This was due to the fact that both al-Douri and Saddam came from the same Tikriti tribal background. When the Ba'athists seized power in 1968, he was made interior minister where he oversaw efforts to sideline political rivals to the Ba'ath Party, mainly the Iraqi Communist Party. Al-Douri became the vice chairman of the Iraqi Revolutionary Command Council prior to 2003, giving him unprecedented amounts of power and influence within the Iraqi political sphere.

As vice chairman of the Revolutionary Command Council, al-Douri was involved in the wars against Iran and Kuwait. During the 1988–1989 Al-Anfal Campaign, al-Douri was said to have ordered Ali Hassan al-Majid (aka 'Chemical Ali') to use Mustard and Sarin nerve gas on Kurdish fighters in Halabja. He was complicit in the invasion of Saudi Arabia and the attack on the town of Khafji in January 1991. Amid the critical Iraq-Kuwait summit in Jeddah, Saudi Arabia, convened on 31 July and 1 August 1990, to address the ongoing crisis, Izzat Ibrahim al-Douri arrived alongside Ali Hassan al-Majid. It was subsequently reported by some sources that the proceedings escalated into severe confrontations and the throwing of objects.

During the 1991 uprisings in Iraq, he was involved in the suppression of the revolt led by the Iraqi Marsh Arabs. When the Kurds rebelled again in 1991, al-Douri warned them "If you have forgotten Halabja, I would like to remind you that we are ready to repeat the operation."

In 1993, al-Douri was involved in the state-sponsored Return to Faith Campaign (al-Hamlah al-Imaniyyah), which sought to encourage devotion to Islam in Iraqi social life. This saw aspects of Islam fused into the Iraqi media, education system and judicial system.

In October 1998, al-Douri escaped an assassination attempt when visiting Karbala.

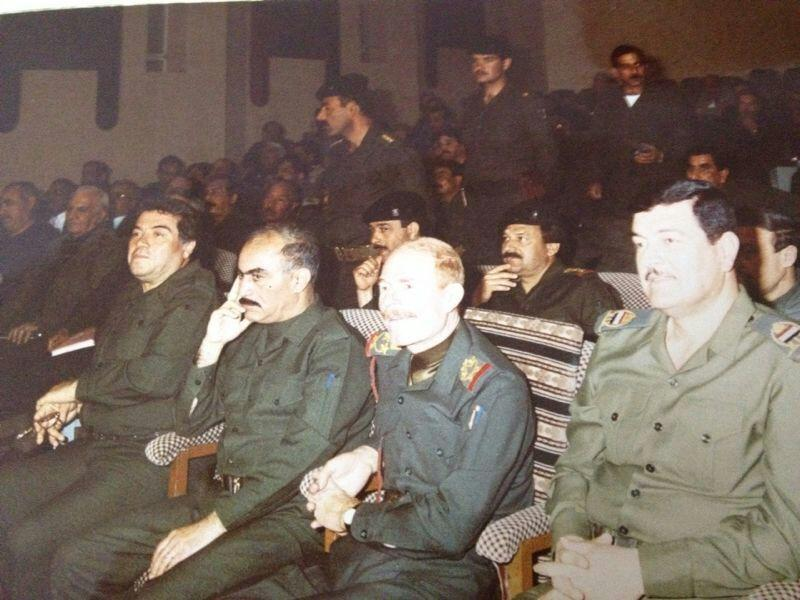
Al-Douri with party members at Baghdad, 2000

Following the October 2000 events, Arab leaders including al-Douri gathered in Cairo condemning Israel's reaction to the protests. In response to the Palestinian protests, Al-Douri was said to have remarked "The Jews will be taught a lesson."

On 5 March 2003, during an emergency summit of the then Organisation of the Islamic Conference, al-Douri made a heated address where he accused the neighbouring Gulf states of being "traitors" for cooperating with the United States and Israel. He blamed Kuwait for being responsible for Iraq's suffering and scrutinised the United States of America's aggressive stance towards Iraq. These comments sparked the Kuwaiti representative to stand up and protest to which al-Douri responded "Shut up, sit down you small American agent, you monkey!"

Al-Douri, a member of the Naqshbandi Order, was able to use his position in the regime to leverage support to the Naqshbandi community within Iraq. This form of patronage would eventfully culminate in the rise of the Army of the Men of the Naqshbandi Order during the Iraqi insurgency, of which al-Douri would play a leading role.

=== Personal life ===
Al-Douri married for the first time in 1968; however, he married five times in total and had 24 children: 13 daughters and 11 sons. In a sign of loyalty, al-Douri consented to marry his daughter Hawazin to Saddam's eldest son, Uday. Al-Douri's influence with Saddam was so substantial that he could even levy a condition, that the union would not be consummated, and later made a successful petition that his daughter be permitted to divorce Uday.

Al-Douri is believed to have suffered from leukemia and was said to have undergone blood transfusions every six months. In 1999, he visited Vienna, Austria for treatment. A Vienna city Councillor submitted an request for the arrest and investigation on al-Douri for war crimes, but the government allowed him to leave the country. His son was reportedly killed in Tikrit in July 2014.

== Fall of the Ba'ath regime and Iraqi insurgency ==
=== The 2003 US invasion of Iraq ===
On 20 March 2003, U.S.-led coalition forces invaded Iraq, leading to the toppling of the regime of President Saddam Hussein on 9 April 2003. Following the fall of Baghdad, al-Douri went into hiding. U.S. officials claimed that he was involved in the subsequent Iraqi insurgency against U.S. forces, directing and funding attacks, as well as brokering an alliance between Ba'athist insurgents and militant Islamists.

In November 2003, the U.S.-led coalition issued a US$10 million bounty for any information leading to al-Douri's apprehension by authorities in response to coordinating attacks against Coalition forces. One of al-Douri's wives and a daughter were captured in the same month, to be questioned about his whereabouts.

Al-Douri was made the King of Clubs in the famous most-wanted Iraqi playing cards, making him among the top 8 "most wanted" figures in Saddam Hussein's regime.

At the time of the invasion of Iraq, al-Douri, along with Saddam and Vice President Taha Yassin Ramadan, were among the three surviving plotters who had brought the Ba'ath Party to power in a coup in 1968.

=== The Iraqi insurgency and disappearance ===
In an interview in May 2008, al-Douri detailed his strategy, indicating that "any negotiations with the invaders without it represents a desertion and treason, and is refused by all national, Pan-Arab and Islamic factions of the resistance." During the interview, al-Douri made the following demands:

1. An official pronounced recognition of the armed and unarmed national resistance, including all its factions and (political) parties, as the sole legitimate representative of the people of Iraq
2. An official declaration of unconditional withdrawal from Iraq by the U.S. leadership
3. Declaring null and void all the political and legislative institutions, as well as all the laws and legislation issued by them, since the occupation, with the de-Ba'athfication law in the forefront, and compensating all who were adversely affected by them
4. A stop to raids, prosecutions, arrests, killings and displacement
5. Release of all prisoners of war (POWs), prisoners and detainees without exception and compensating all for their physical and psychological damage
6. Reinstating the army and the national security forces in service in accordance with their preoccupation laws and regulations, and compensating all who were adversely affected by dissolving them
7. A pledge to compensate Iraq for all the material and moral losses it incurred because of the occupation

Al-Douri was reportedly the head of the Iraqi resistance group Army of the Men of the Naqshbandi Order as well as the Supreme Command for Jihad and Liberation based on his longstanding positions of leadership in the Naqshbandi sect in Iraq.

==== Whereabouts ====
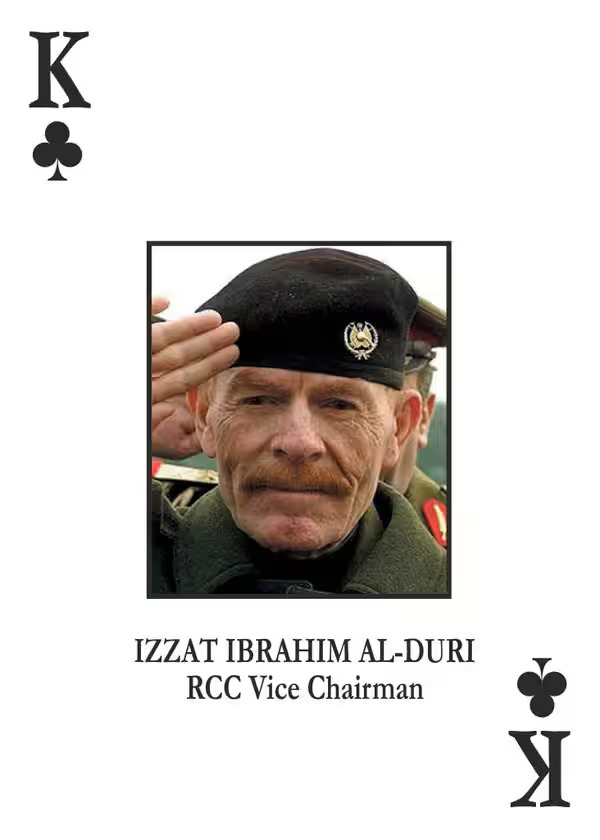
Izzat Ibrahim al-Douri depicted as the King of Clubs in the US Department of Defense's "Most-wanted" playing cards

Sometime after the Fall of Baghdad, al-Douri evaded capture and went into hiding. There are many different reports on his whereabouts. Several sources close to al-Douri's family reported to Al Jazeera that they had not heard of al-Douri since April 2003 and did not know where he was hiding.

According to veteran intelligence consultant Malcolm Nance and a U.S. telegram cable, al-Douri and the Iraqi Revolutionary Command Council were rumoured to have developed deep relations with Hafez al-Assad and the Syrian Ba'ath party, despite historical differences between the two Ba'ath factions. Al-Douri urged Saddam to open oil pipelines with Syria, building a financial relationship with the Assad family. Nance would also allege that al-Douri fled to Syria after the 2003 Invasion of Iraq, where he organised the National Command of the Islamic Resistance which co-ordinated major combat operations during the Iraqi insurgency.

The RAND Corporation reported prior to the capture of Saddam Hussein, al-Douri served as "Saddam's point of contact in Diyala Governorate" and that he had visited Diyala twice to meet with leaders to organize the insurgency inside Iraq.

There were reports from al-Hayat that al-Douri was allegedly in Mosul visiting his wife, before fleeing to an undisclosed location. NBC News reported that al-Douri was rumoured to be hiding in Syria or elsewhere.

In 2007, Iraqi security forces raided a hideout in Tikrit belonging to al-Douri, the raid was based on "confirmed intelligence" that al-Douri was holding meetings with his aides at the hideout. Al-Douri however was not caught. In early 2007, Iraqi President Jalal Talabani claimed al-Douri was not in Syria, but that he was in Yemen, saying that the Iraqi government has had this information for a while and had been tracing al-Douri's movements. A U.S. intelligence source told the Long War Journal, that al-Douri was being sheltered in northern Iraq. Iraqi tribal expert and senior fellow at the United States Institute of Peace, Amatzia Baram, claimed that al-Douri is likely in hiding somewhere between Mosul and the Turkish border. Middle East expert Juan Cole believes that al-Douri is likely in the Mosul area and not Syria.

The U.S. claimed that al-Douri resurfaced in Syria in 2008, however, Al-Mawqif Al-Arabi, an Egyptian newspaper which interviewed al-Douri that same year, told reporters that he was "on the battlefield" and on a "combat field while weapons were talking", presumably meaning he was still fighting in Iraq. The Combating Terrorism Center reported that al-Douri was still "politically active within Iraq." The Irish Times reported that it was believed that al-Douri was hiding somewhere in Iraq. Likewise, The Times reported that it was believed that al-Douri was hiding around Mosul or Tikrit. Other reports claimed that al-Douri was in the Iraqi town of Ad-Dawr and Iraqi Kurdistan.

General David Petraeus who was at the time heading the United States Central Command, told reporters from Al Arabiya that al-Douri was still residing in Syria with "complete freedom". The Syrian government denied that al-Douri was residing in Syria. Iraqi Prime Minister Nouri al-Maliki claimed to U.S. officials that a Syrian offered to show him al-Douri's home in Damascus during a visit. However, Iraqi intelligence sources in 2009 have emphasized that al-Douri was residing in the southern suburbs of Diyala in an Islamic State of Iraq stronghold.

Unconfirmed speculations located al-Douri somewhere in Gulf or the southern Arabian Peninsula, or in Qatar, while other theories claimed that al-Douri had stayed in Iraq permanently since 2003, or that he had "a number of safe houses in and around Muqdadiya."

Despite allegations from U.S. and Iraqi officials that al-Douri was residing in Syria, al-Douri had opposed and even attempted to oust the Syrian-backed Iraqi Ba'athist, Mohammed Younis al-Ahmed, from the party and he had also criticized the Syrian government for being part of an American conspiracy to undermine the Iraqi Ba'ath Party. Furthermore, analysts have noted that "Douri deeply distrusts working with the Syrians because he distrusts the Iranians, who are strong allies with Syria". In an interview on 26 May 2008, al-Douri boasted that his resistance was not supported or incubated by any outside powers.

Some leaders such as former national security advisor Mowaffak al-Rubaie and former Prime Minister Nouri al-Maliki have accused the Assad government of harbouring and supporting Iraqi militants. A charge Ba'athist Syria heavily denied and demanded be proven with evidence.

While U.S. telegram cable claimed by at least October 2009 that al-Douri was no longer part of the "former regime elements" living in Syria, U.S. intelligence believed al-Douri operated out of Syria until the start of the Syrian civil war in 2011, when he may have moved to safe houses across the North-western Iraq province of Nineveh. Malcolm Nance, however claims that al-Douri was still in Syria by as late as 2013, before moving to Tikrit in 2014.

=== Iraqi insurgency and resurfacing ===
On 10 November 2011, a man claiming to be Izzat Ibrahim al-Douri released an audio tape condemning a recent arrest campaign targeting suspected Ba'ath Party members.

The first visual evidence of his survival surfaced on 7 April 2012 when a video posted online showed him giving a speech. In the shots, he is seen wearing an olive Saddam-era military uniform (with the rank of Field Marshal) and glasses, denouncing the Shiite-led government in Baghdad and interference in Iraqi politics by regional Shia powerhouse Iran. "Everyone can hear the sounds of danger echoing daily and threatening this country," al-Douri says during the hour-long broadcast. Prime Minister Maliki's personal adviser, Ali al-Moussawi, said the tape had a propaganda function but that he doubted al-Douri was still in Iraq as he required extensive medical care for a number of illnesses.

On 5 January 2013, a 53-minute video was released on YouTube in which al-Douri encouraged recent Sunni protests in Nineveh and Anbar Governorates against Prime Minister Nouri al-Maliki, saying that "the people of Iraq and all its nationalist and Islamic forces support you until the realization of your just demands for the fall of the Safavid-Persian alliance." The message, which showed the Ba'athist leader sitting behind a desk with a small Saddam-era Iraqi flag on it, was partially broadcast on the Al Arabiya news channel. In the video, released just before the Iraqi Army Day on 6 January, Douri claimed to be somewhere in Iraq's Babil Governorate. However, former U.S. intelligence officials believe it was filmed in Damascus, Syria. Hours after the tape was released, Iraqi military intelligence arrested Abdul Rahman Mohammed Ibrahim, the nephew of al-Douri, in Saladin Governorate.

In April 2013, the Iraqi government claimed to be closing in on al-Douri, who they claimed was moving between Tikrit and the towns of Hawija and Dour, which is alleged to be an area of strong support for al-Douri, and also where he is claimed to have owned a villa. In 2014, al-Douri returned to Tikrit during the Iraqi Civil War.

== The fall of Mosul and Iraqi Civil War ==
Al-Douri played a role in the Northern Iraq Offensive as commander of the Naqshbandi Army. Reports soon surfaced that he had links with the jihadist group ISIL, helping them take the city of Tikrit and coordinating attacks against Iraqi security forces. On 13 June, a Twitter account, @wikibaghdadi, claimed a "Meeting between ISIS and Naqshbandi Army near al-Qayara area south of Mosul had taken place with representatives from Izzat Ibrahim al-Douri and Abu Bakr al-Baghdadi." In July 2014, al-Douri issued an audio recording praising "the heroes and knights of al Qaeda and the Islamic State" forces in attacking Iraqi government positions within Saladin, Kirkuk, Diyala, and Nineveh Governorates. His connections with Islamist elements in Iraq is said to have emerged as far back as during Saddam's regime. According to the Soufan Group, al-Douri had close ties with senior ISIL officials Abu Muslim al-Turkmani and Abu Ayman al-Iraqi. Both men had served in the Ba'athist regime under Saddam Hussein, with al-Turkmani being a Lieutenant colonel and serving in the Istikhbarat and Special Republican Guard. Al-Iraqi had been a Colonel in Iraq's Air Defense Intelligence.

Al-Douri has been pointed out as one of the main commanders responsible for successful takeover by resistance groups of North Iraq and the city of Mosul in June 2014. The Naqshbandi Army, along with other groups led by former Ba'ath officers, are reported to have assumed an increasingly large role in the governance and administration of occupied cities. Militants were reported to have appointed fellow Ba'ath generals Azhar al-Obeidi and Ahmed Abdul Rashid as the governors of Mosul and Tikrit. Shortly afterwards, unverified reports emerged that the Ba'ath Party, under al-Douri's leadership, declared war on ISIL in response to the displacement of Christians from Mosul. Other reports still maintained that there was a limited degree of cooperation between the two groups.

=== Iraqi Civil War and resurfacing ===
In May 2015, an audio recording alleging to be that of al-Douri, criticized both IS and Iran. He also hailed the Saudi-led alliance targeting the Houthi militias in Yemen. On IS he stated "We do cross paths ... but what stops us from meeting is that even if we wanted to, they would not accept because they consider the Ba'ath infidels". He claimed that the group was detaining a third of the Ba'ath's command, and then went on to claim the number of IS victims in Iraq "does not equal 1% of those killed by the militias". On Iran, al-Douri called for the "Iraqis in Al-Anbar and Karbala to strongly fight the Persian criminal plan, which aims at swallowing Iraq." He stressed that Iran is the main player in Iraq and it is working through the Quds Force.

In October 2015, it was reported that al-Douri's Naqshbandi Army was involved in secret discussions with the Iraqi government, alongside other insurgent groups, as part of a move to create a new Sunni force to fight IS in Iraq.

On 7 April 2016, he released a video in which he sits at a desk in military uniform, flanked by two bodyguards and reads a statement. He calls on 'mujahideen' in Iraq to fight the Shia militias and combat Iranian influence in Iraq under the Islamic Military Alliance to Fight Terrorism created by Saudi Arabia on 15 December 2015. He said: "We consider everything that is happening in Iraq from Iran, its agents, militias, and its security apparatus, is the responsibility of the United States". He added: "If it [U.S.] did not move to save Iraq and its people from Iran's hegemony, control and occupation, and to stop bloodshed, destruction, burning and the changing demographic, then Iraqi people should resist [the occupation]." He stated that one of the ways to deal with the issue in Yemen was to make Iran and its allies adhere to the Security Council decision on ceasefire.

On 7 April 2018, al-Douri released a new video commemorating the 71st anniversary of the Baath party and vowing that U.S. President Donald Trump "will never attack Iran until the Resurrection Day."

In an article published by NRT News, an Iraqi politician, Hassan Alawi, claimed to have had information about previous meetings of al-Douri in the Kurdistan Region of Iraq, claiming "he never left the homeland".

=== Allegations of death ===
In November 2005, Arab media reported that al-Douri died of natural causes, probably in Iraq. On 17 April 2015, al-Douri allegedly died during a military operation conducted by the Iraqi Army near Al-Alaas oil fields in Hamrin Mountains, east of Tikrit. Iraqi security forces and Shia militias opened fire at a convoy believed to be carrying al-Douri and nine bodyguards, resulting in a 25-minute firefight. General Haider al-Basri, a senior Iraqi commander, announced to state television that the man believed to be al-Douri and his guards were killed. The Shi'ite militant organization Asa'ib Ahl al-Haq claimed to have killed him, saying that his body was being transported to Baghdad to confirm its identity. Before delivering the body to Baghdad, Shi'ite militias did DNA tests on the body and confirmed the results on 19 April. The body was delivered to Baghdad on 20 April, with the government starting the DNA tests a day after, on 21 April. The governor of Salahaddin province, Raed al-Jabbouri, characterized al-Douri as a "mastermind of Islamic State in Iraq" and stated that his death would be a blow to the group.

On 24 April 2015, the Iraqi Health Ministry spokesman, Dr. Ziyad Tareq, said: "The ministry does not have any DNA test (results) for any relative of al-Douri at the present time, and further efforts will be made to achieve a DNA result."

On 15 May 2015, a Ba'athist television channel released an audio recording, purportedly made by al-Douri, in which the speaker referred to events that had happened since al-Douri's reported death on 17 April.

In April 2018, Izzat released a new video where he talked about current issues in different Arab countries. On 21 June 2018, Raghad Saddam Hussein was reported to have sent a note of condolence to Al Douri's family, with the source saying that "Douri died of a hematological illness at a Tunisian hospital."

== Death ==
Several Arabic language media outlets reported that the Ba'ath Party announced his death on 26 October 2020. It is unknown what he died of. Al-Baath Party issued a statement following his death on 25 October, which read: "Today, the knight of the Baath and the Iraqi national resistance has dismounted from his horse". Saddam's daughter, Raghad, tweeted a message confirming Al-Douri's death on 26 October.

== See also ==
- Muhammad Saeed al-Sahhaf

Party political offices
Preceded by Saddam Hussein	Leader of the Ba'ath Party; 2006–2020	Succeeded by Salah Al-Mukhtar
