= Taha Muhie-eldin Marouf =

5th vice president of Iraq

- طٰهٰ مُحْيِي الدِّين مَعْرُوف
- Marouf in 1978

Vice President of Iraq
- In office April 1974 – April 2003 Serving with Saddam Hussein (until 1979), Izzat Ibrahim al-Douri (after 1979) and Taha Yassin Ramadan (after 1991)
- President: Ahmed Hassan al-Bakr; Saddam Hussein
- Preceded by: Salih Mahdi Ammash
- Succeeded by: Izzat Ibrahim al-Douri

Personal details
- Born: 1924 Sulaymaniyah, Mandatory Iraq
- Died: 7 August 2009 (aged 84–85) Amman, Jordan
- Party: Iraqi Regional Branch of the Arab Socialist Ba'ath Party

Taha Muhie-eldin Marouf (Arabic: طٰهٰ مُحْيِي الدِّين مَعْرُوف; 1924 – 7 August 2009) was an Iraqi-Kurdish politician and diplomat who served as the vice president of Iraq from 1974 until the U.S. invasion in April 2003. He was also a member of the Revolutionary Command Council, making him one of the few Kurdish leaders to hold a prominent position within the Baathist regime, albeit in a largely ceremonial capacity.

== Early life ==
He was born in 1924 in Sulaymaniyah, into a wealthy and influential Kurdish family in Sulaymaniah, Kurdistan of Iraq. He completed his secondary education in his hometown and graduated from the College of Law in Baghdad in 1948. After practicing law, he entered politics, joining the Kurdish Rizgari Liberation Party in 1945. He later contributed to the establishment of the Kurdistan Democratic Party (KDP) in 1946, serving as a member of its Central Committee. His older brother Qader Agha was the head of the Sulaymaniyah Municipal Council.

== Political life ==
Marouf's political career spanned several decades, beginning with his role in the KDP and evolving through various governmental and diplomatic positions. After leaving the KDP following internal splits in 1964, he joined the Ibrahim Ahmed and Jalal Talabani wing of the party before transitioning to the diplomatic corps in the 1960s.

When the Arab Socialist Baath Party seized power in 1968, Marouf joined in same year. In 1970, he became his country's ambassador abroad after the March 1970 statement. Marouf proved to be a successful diplomat due to his proficiency in many languages.

He held several ministerial positions, such as Minister of State and Acting Minister of Public Works. Following the failure of the Kurdish rebellion in 1975 and the signing of the Algiers Agreement between Iraq and Iran, Marouf was appointed Vice President under Ahmed Hassan al-Bakr. He continued in this role when Saddam Hussein assumed the presidency in 1979, serving until the US invasion in 2003.

Marouf was an ethnic Kurd in Saddam Hussein's Ba'ath Party hierarchy, but the Kurdish community viewed his appointment as a mere gesture, believing that he had little real power. However, he did serve as ambassador to Italy, Malta, and Albania. Marouf represented the president at formal events, protocol visits, and certain international forums.

== Iraq War ==
It was announced that Marouf was taken into custody on 2 May 2003. He had been captured with two other Saddam deputies Abd al-Tawab Mullah Huwaysh, director of the Office of Military Industrialization and a deputy prime minister in charge of arms procurement, and Mizban Khadr Hadi commander of one of four military regions Saddam established on the eve of the 2003 invasion of Iraq. Marouf was #24 (initially #42) on the U.S. list of most-wanted Iraqis. He was represented by the nine of diamonds in the most-wanted Iraqi playing cards.

On May 3, 2003, American forces detained him and placed him in their custody. However, he was later released, as no evidence linked him to war crimes or crimes against humanity, unlike other officials from the former regime. Seen largely as a symbolic representative of the Kurds, his role did not attract significant allegations. Following his release, he relocated to the Kurdistan region in northern Iraq, where he spent the remainder of his years.

== Death ==
He died on 7 August 2009 in Amman, Jordan. He was buried in Erbil, Kurdistan Region the following day.

== See also ==
- Taha Yassin Ramadan
- Ibrahim Hesqel
