= Vice President of Iraq =

Deputy head of state of the Republic of Iraq

Vice President of the Republic of Iraq
- Official emblem
- Incumbent; Vacant since 2 October 2018
- Style: His Excellency
- Appointer: Parliamentary vote on the names submitted by the President
- Term length: Four years
- Formation: 14 July 1958; 10 October 2016 (restored)
- Salary: 122,400 USD annually

Iraq has had three vice presidents or deputy presidents serving concurrently.

The office of Vice President was historically largely ceremonial but prestigious. In post-war Iraq, the Constitution of Iraq, in its "Transitional Guidelines," creates a three-member presidency (or presidential) council, consisting of the president of Iraq and two deputy presidents, who must act in unison. The presidency council had three members to accommodate Iraq's three largest groups: Sunni Muslim Arabs, Shiite Muslim Arabs, and the mostly Sunni Kurds. As a unit, the Presidency Council was meant to symbolize the unity of the nation. This arrangement is required by the constitution to continue until the Council of Representatives, enters its second set of sessions. At this point, the Presidency Council would be replaced by a solitary President of the Republic, who would have only one deputy, the vice-president. In any case, the Presidency is appointed by the Council of Representatives. The three-member arrangement was a hold-over from the Iraqi Interim Government and the Iraqi Transitional Government.

In September 2014, three new vice presidents were elected: former prime ministers Nouri al-Maliki and Ayad Allawi and former speaker of Parliament Osama al-Nujaifi.

On August 11, 2015, the Council of Representatives approved the plan proposed by the al Abadi government to eliminate the positions of vice president and deputy prime minister. However, this decision was met with opposition, and Osama al-Nujaifi filed a constitutional complaint. Nuri al-Maliki also expressed his determination to retain his position.

On October 10, 2016, Federal Supreme Court of Iraq of Iraq ruled that the abolition of the three vice president posts was unconstitutional. Consequently, the positions were reinstated.

However, since October 2, 2018, the three vice president posts have remained vacant.

== List of officeholders ==
=== Under Iraqi Republic and Ba'athist Iraq ===
The Ba'athist regime of Ahmed Hassan al-Bakr and Saddam Hussein also used the office of Vice President. However, the post was not as influential as the Vice Chairmen of the Revolutionary Command Council. Vice Presidents were appointed at the discretion of the President.

Portrait	Name (Birth–Death)	Term of office			Political party	President	Notes
Portrait	Name (Birth–Death)	Took office	Left office	Time in office	Political party	President	Notes
→ • Iraqi Republic (pre–Ba'ath Party) (1958–1968) • →
	Ahmed Hassan al-Bakr أحمد حسن البكر (1914–1982)	18 November 1963	4 January 1964	47 days	Iraqi Ba'ath Party (Iraq Region)	Abdul Salam Arif	
→ • Iraqi Republic (under Ba'ath Party) (1968–2003) • →
	Saddam Hussein صدام حسين (1937–2006)	17 July 1968	15 July 1979	10 years, 363 days	Iraqi Ba'ath Party (Iraq Region)	Ahmed Hassan al-Bakr	
	Hardan al-Tikriti حردان عبدالغفار التكريتي (1925–1971)	3 April 1970	15 October 1970	195 days	Iraqi Ba'ath Party (Iraq Region)	Ahmed Hassan al-Bakr	
	Salih Mahdi Ammash صالح مهدي عماش (1924–1985)	3 April 1970	December 1971	1 year, 7 months	Iraqi Ba'ath Party (Iraq Region)	Ahmed Hassan al-Bakr	
	Taha Muhie-eldin Marouf طه محيي الدين معروف (1929–2009)	April 1974	April 2003	29 years	Iraqi Ba'ath Party (Iraq Region)	Ahmed Hassan al-Bakr; Saddam Hussein	
	Izzat Ibrahim al-Douri عزة إبراهيم الدوري (1942–2020)	16 July 1979	9 April 2003	23 years, 267 days	Iraqi Ba'ath Party (Iraq Region)	Saddam Hussein	
	Taha Yassin Ramadan طه ياسين رمضان الجزراوي (1938–2007)	March 1991	9 April 2003	12 years, 39 days	Iraqi Ba'ath Party (Iraq Region)	Saddam Hussein	

=== Republic of Iraq since 2004 ===
Portrait	Name (Birth–Death)	Term of office			Political party	President	Notes
Portrait	Name (Birth–Death)	Took office	Left office	Time in office	Political party	President	Notes
	Ibrahim al-Jaafari إبراهيم الجعفري (born 1947)	1 June 2004	7 April 2005	310 days	Islamic Dawa Party	Ghazi Mashal Ajil al-Yawer	
	Rowsch Shaways روز نورى شاويس (1947–2021)	1 June 2004	7 April 2005	310 days	Kurdistan Democratic Party	Ghazi Mashal Ajil al-Yawer	
	Adil Abdul-Mahdi عادل عبد المهدي (born 1942)	7 April 2005	11 July 2011	6 years, 95 days	Islamic Supreme Council of Iraq	Jalal Talabani	
	Ghazi Mashal Ajil al-Yawer غازي مشعل عجيل الياور (born 1958)	7 April 2005	22 April 2006	1 year, 15 days	The Iraqis	Jalal Talabani	
	Tariq al-Hashimi طارق الهاشمي (born 1942)	22 April 2006	10 September 2012	6 years, 141 days	Iraqi Islamic Party	Jalal Talabani	
	Khodair al-Khozaei خضير الخزاعي (born 1947)	13 May 2011	9 September 2014	3 years, 119 days	Islamic Dawa Party – Iraq Organisation	Jalal Talabani; Fuad Masum	
	Nouri al-Maliki نوري المالكي (born 1950)	9 September 2014	11 August 2015	336 days	Islamic Dawa Party	Fuad Masum	
	Osama al-Nujaifi أسامة النجيفي (born 1956)	9 September 2014	11 August 2015	336 days	Muttahidoon	Fuad Masum	
	Ayad Allawi أياد علاوي (born 1944)	9 September 2014	11 August 2015	336 days	Iraqi National Accord	Fuad Masum	
Post abolished (11 August 2015–10 October 2016)
Post restored (10 October 2016–present)
	Nouri al-Maliki نوري المالكي (born 1950)	10 October 2016	2 October 2018	1 year, 357 days	Islamic Dawa Party	Fuad Masum	
	Osama al-Nujaifi أسامة النجيفي (born 1956)	10 October 2016	2 October 2018	1 year, 357 days	Muttahidoon	Fuad Masum	
	Ayad Allawi أياد علاوي (born 1944)	10 October 2016	2 October 2018	1 year, 357 days	Iraqi National Accord	Fuad Masum	

== See also ==
- List of current vice presidents
