= Iraqi insurgency (2003–2011) =

Sectarian and anti-government warfare in American-occupied Iraq

- Part of the Iraq War
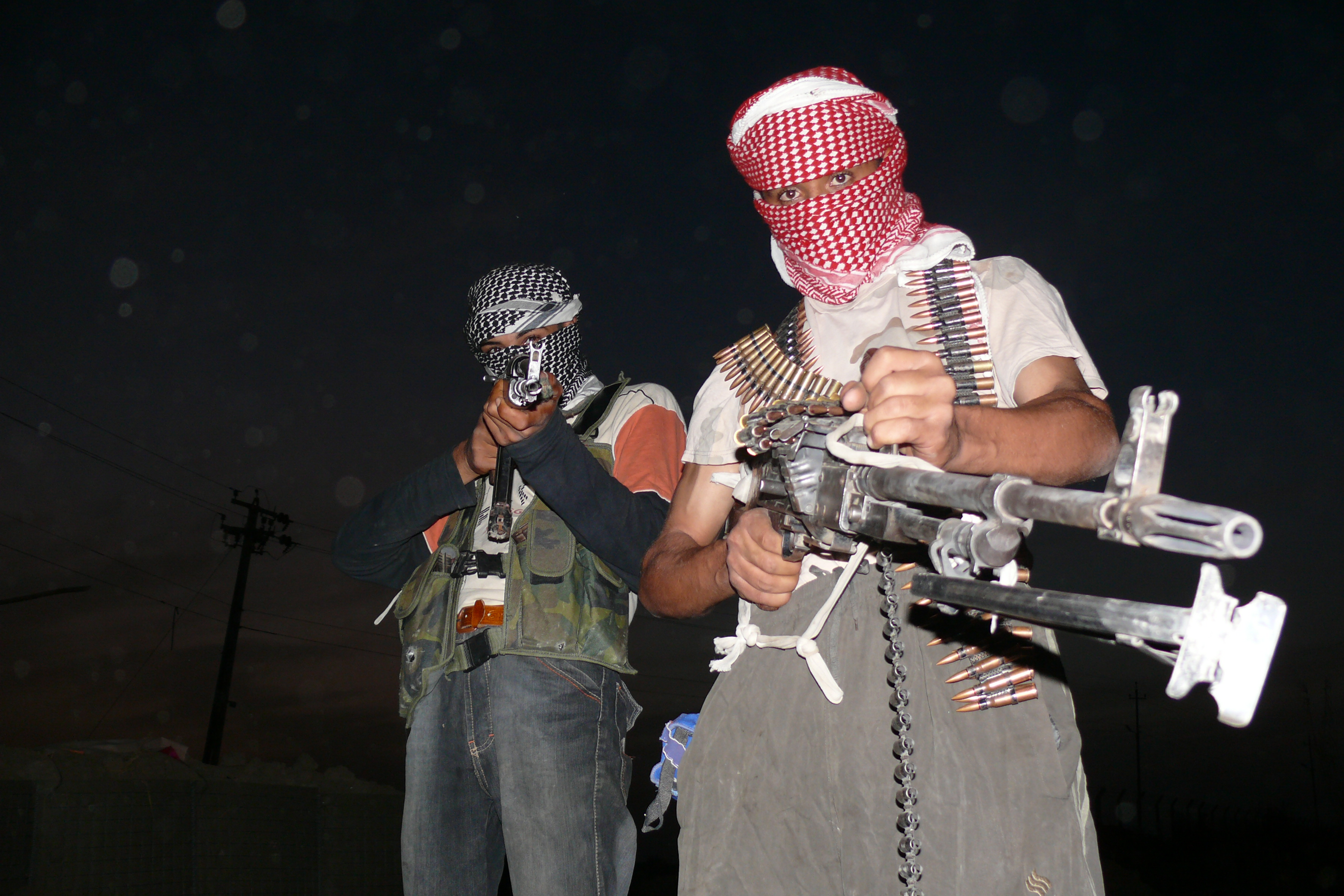
- Insurgents in northern Iraq, 2006
Date	9 April 2003 – 18 December 2011 (8 years, 8 months, 1 week and 2 days)
Location	Iraq
Result	Inconclusive: 2003–2006 insurgency phase deteriorates into 2006–2008 civil war; 20,000+ additional American soldiers deployed to Iraq to quell violence in troop surge of 2007; Coalition failure to defeat Iraqi insurgency; End of American military presence in Iraq with 2007–2011 withdrawal; Continued Iraqi conflict

Belligerents
United States; United Kingdom MNF–I (2003–09): United States (2003–09); United Kingdom (2003–09); Australia (2003–09); Romania (2003–09); Azerbaijan (2003–08); Kuwait (2003–08); Estonia (2003–09); El Salvador (2003–09); Bulgaria (2003–08); Moldova (2003–08); Albania (2003–08); Ukraine (2003–08); Denmark (2003–08); Czech Republic (2003–08); South Korea (2003–08); Singapore (2003–08); Croatia (2003–08); Bosnia and Herzegovina (2003–08); Republic of Macedonia (2003–08); Latvia (2003–08); Poland (2003–08); Kazakhstan (2003–08); Mongolia (2003–08); Georgia (2003–08); Tonga (2004–08); Japan (2004–08); Armenia (2005–08); Slovakia (2003–07); Lithuania (2003–07); Italy (2003–06); Norway (2003–06); Hungary (2003–05); Netherlands (2003–05); Portugal (2003–05); New Zealand (2003–04); Thailand (2003–04); Philippines (2003–04); Honduras (2003–04); Dominican Republic (2003–04); Spain (2003–04); Nicaragua (2003–04); Iceland (2003–unknown); New Iraqi government: Iraqi Armed Forces; Iraqi Police; Iraqi Kurdistan; Peshmerga; Sons of Iraq; Badr Organization	Sunni insurgents; Al-Qaeda; Al-Qaeda in Iraq (2004–06); Islamic State of Iraq (from 2006); Islamic Army in Iraq; (Ba'athist Iraq) Naqshbandi Army (from 2006); Ansar al-Sunnah (2003–07); other smaller groups; Several Sunni Tribes	Shia insurgents; Mahdi Army (2003–2008); Special Groups; Kata'ib Hezbollah; Asa'ib Ahl al-Haq; Promised Day Brigades (from 2008); other smaller groups; Several Shia Tribes

Commanders and leaders
George W. Bush; Barack Obama; Tommy Franks; Donald Rumsfeld; Robert Gates; Tony Blair; Gordon Brown; David Cameron; John Howard; Kevin Rudd; Silvio Berlusconi; Walter Natynczyk; José María Aznar; Anders Fogh Rasmussen; Aleksander Kwaśniewski; Ayad Allawi; Ibrahim al-Jaafari; Nouri al-Maliki; Ali Khamenei; Mohammad Salimi; Ataollah Salehi (Iran) Qasem Soleimani	Abu Musab al-Zarqawi †; Abu Ayyub al-Masri †; Abu Omar al-Baghdadi †; Abu Bakr al-Baghdadi; Abu Abdullah al-Shafi'i (POW); Ishmael Jubouri	Muqtada al-Sadr; Abu Deraa; Akram al-Kaabi; Abu Mahdi al-Muhandis; Qais al-Khazali

The Iraqi insurgency lasted from 2003 until 2011, beginning shortly after the 2003 American invasion deposed longtime leader Saddam Hussein, and lasting until the end of the Iraq War and U.S. withdrawal in 2011. It was followed by a renewed insurgency.

The initial outbreak of violence (the 2003–2006 phase) was triggered by the fall and preceded the establishment of the new Iraqi government by the Multi-National Force – Iraq (MNF–I), which was led by the U.S. From around 2004 to May 2007, Iraqi insurgents largely focused their attacks on MNF-I troops, but later shifted to targeting the post-invasion Iraqi security forces as well.

The insurgents were composed of a diverse mix of private militias, pro-Saddam Ba'athists, local Iraqis opposed to the MNF–I and/or the post-Saddam Iraqi government, and a number of foreign jihadists. The various insurgent groups fought an asymmetric war of attrition against the MNF–I and the Iraqi government, while also fighting among themselves.

The insurgency was shaped by sectarian tensions in Iraq, particularly between Shia Muslims (~60% of the population) and Sunni Muslims (~35% of the population). By February 2006, the violence escalated into a Shia–Sunni civil war, and for the next two years, the MNF–I and the Iraqi government were locked in intense fighting with various militants, who were also targeting each other based on their sectarian affiliations. Many of the militant attacks in American-controlled territories were directed at the Shia-dominated government of Nouri al-Maliki. Militancy continued amid post-invasion Iraqi reconstruction efforts, as the federal government tried to establish itself in the country. The civil war and sectarian violence ended in mid-2008, having been quelled by the American troop surge of 2007.

However, after the American withdrawal from Iraq in December 2011, a renewed sectarian and anti-government insurgency swept through the country, causing thousands of casualties. Two years later, the violence of the new insurgency escalated into the Second Iraq War, largely triggered by the rise of the Islamic State.

== Background ==
The 2003 invasion of Iraq (20 March – 1 May 2003) began the Iraq War, or Operation Iraqi Freedom, in which a combined force of troops from the United States, the United Kingdom, Australia, and Poland invaded Iraq and toppled the government of Saddam Hussein within 26 days of major combat operations. The invasion phase consisted of a conventionally fought war which concluded with the capture of the Iraq capital Baghdad by U.S. forces.

Four countries participated with troops during the initial invasion phase, which lasted from 20 March to 15 April 2003. These were the United States (148,000), United Kingdom (45,000), Australia (2,000), and Poland (194). Thirty-six other countries were involved in its aftermath. In preparation for the invasion, 100,000 U.S. troops were assembled in Kuwait by 18 February. The United States supplied the majority of the invading forces, but also received support from Kurdish irregulars in Iraqi Kurdistan.

The invasion was preceded by an air strike on the Presidential Palace in Baghdad on 20 March 2003. The following day coalition forces launched an incursion into Basra Province from their massing point close to the Iraq-Kuwait border. While the special forces launched an amphibious assault from the Persian Gulf to secure Basra and the surrounding petroleum fields, the main invasion army moved into southern Iraq, occupying the region and engaging in the Battle of Nasiriyah on 23 March. Massive air strikes across the country and against Iraqi command and control threw the defending army into chaos and prevented an effective resistance. On 26 March, the 173rd Airborne Brigade was airdropped near the northern city of Kirkuk, where they joined forces with Kurdish rebels and fought several actions against the Iraqi army to secure the northern part of the country.

The main body of coalition forces continued their drive into the heart of Iraq and met with little resistance. Most of the Iraqi military was quickly defeated and Baghdad was occupied on 9 April. Other operations occurred against pockets of the Iraqi army including the capture and occupation of Kirkuk on 10 April, and the attack and capture of Tikrit on 15 April. Saddam and the central leadership went into hiding as the coalition forces completed the occupation of the country.

On 1 May, an end of major combat operations was declared, ending the invasion stage of the Iraq War and beginning the military occupation period and the Iraqi insurgency against coalition forces.

On 23 May 2003, Iraqi military personnel, police and security services were disbanded per Order 2 of the Coalition Provisional Authority under Administrator Paul Bremer, leaving 400,000 soldiers and officers jobless, providing a ready pool of recruits for Islamist groups and other insurgents that emerged. Furthermore, for 10 months Iraq's borders were left open for anyone to come in without even a visa or a passport.

== History ==
=== 2003–2006: initial insurgency ===
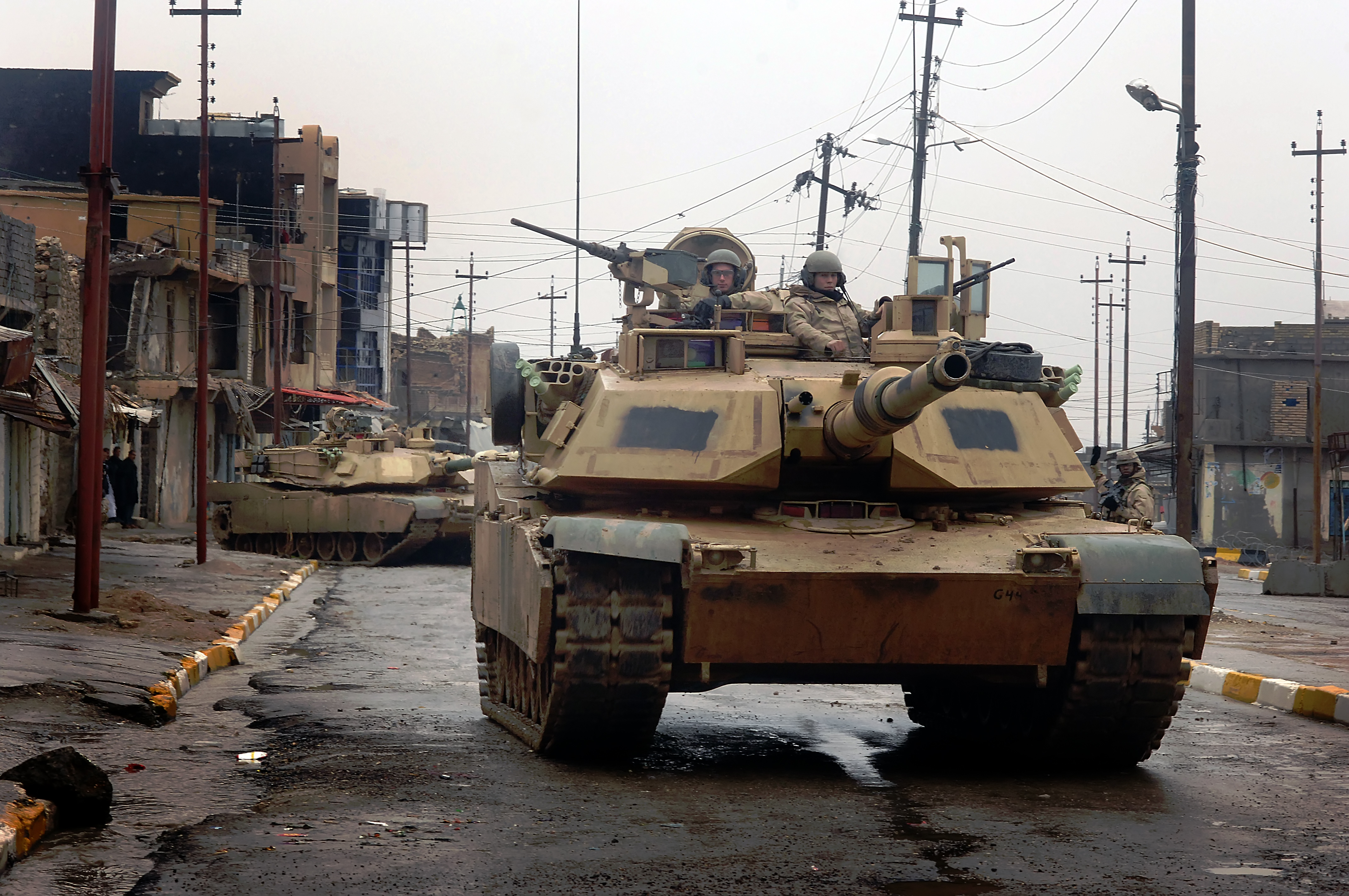
U.S. Army M1A2 Abrams tanks patrol the streets of Tal Afar, Iraq in February 2005.

The Iraqi insurgency of 2003–06 erupted following the invasion of Iraq and the toppling of Saddam's rule in April 2003. The armed insurgent opposition to the United States-led multinational force in Iraq and the post-2003 Iraqi government lasted until early 2006, when it deteriorated into a sectarian civil war, the most violent phase of the Iraq War.

=== Fallujah killings of April 2003 ===
The armed insurgency continued on with the topple of Saddam's regime. The US military met limited resistance in multiple sectors of Central Iraq, Fallujah had avoided most damage from ground attack but began receiving bombardment by the 82nd Airborne who entered Fallujah on April 23rd. 5 days later on April 28th US military opened fire on local protestors claiming to have been provoked, these protestors denied any altercation and communicated that they had been fired upon without reason. 17 people were killed with around 70 injured, two days later the US encountered another protest where shots were fired upon the crowd. US soldiers had been occupying Fallujah for limited time at this point. Soldiers had been found using night vision to harass the citizens of the city, disrupting day to day life without reason.

The protestors had been shouting for their liberation; they had been under occupation by both the US and Iraqi military. Their protests included shouts of ‘God is great! Muhammad is his prophet!’ and ‘No to Saddam! No to the US!’, and while loud and crowded as these protests were, none of them involved violence. This caused difficulty for US military in trying to define when there were threats and when it was just protests, anti-US insurgents used schools, mosques, and other community centers to bait the military into looking anti-Islamic and creating another line of defense against US occupation within Iraq.

Iraqi insurgents used the killings to their advantage, creating Fallujah into a safe space for insurgents. With the US military now depicted in a negative view by the people and insurgents, it allowed for a hotspot of anti-American sentiment without fear of conspirators or pro-US military factions opposing the insurgents. The disproportionate use of force by the US military sent the task of settling and bringing peace to a torn Iraq in the complete opposite direction, causing complete alienation and transforming the American push for liberation into an existential threat against the Iraqi citizens.

The US government and officials were not able to comprehend the mistake that was made with the massacre. With lack of resources and communication, they viewed the insurgents not as true military threats. This warfare can be compared to Vietnam's guerrilla tactics, which is why generals and commanders were slow to realize the damage the Iraqi insurgents were having on US troops and resources. The Fallujah massacre proved the intentions of US forces, not to fight and liberate, but invade and dismantle. The killings of protestors outside a primary school (the Al-Qa'id school) provided potent imagery: an American military force that was so brutal it fired on students, teachers, and parents. By successfully framing the U.S. as the brutal enemy, insurgent leaders turned "fence-sitters" and moderates into a crucial support network. This passive support providing safe houses, logistical information, silence, and funding is the lifeblood of any effective insurgency, enabling militants to melt back into the population and strike repeatedly. 39 Americans were killed and 90 wounded in the during First Battle of Fallujah. About 200 insurgents are believed to have been killed. The number of civilian deaths are not fully known, but are estimated to be at least 600, half of those women and children.

=== 2006–2008: insurgency to civil war ===
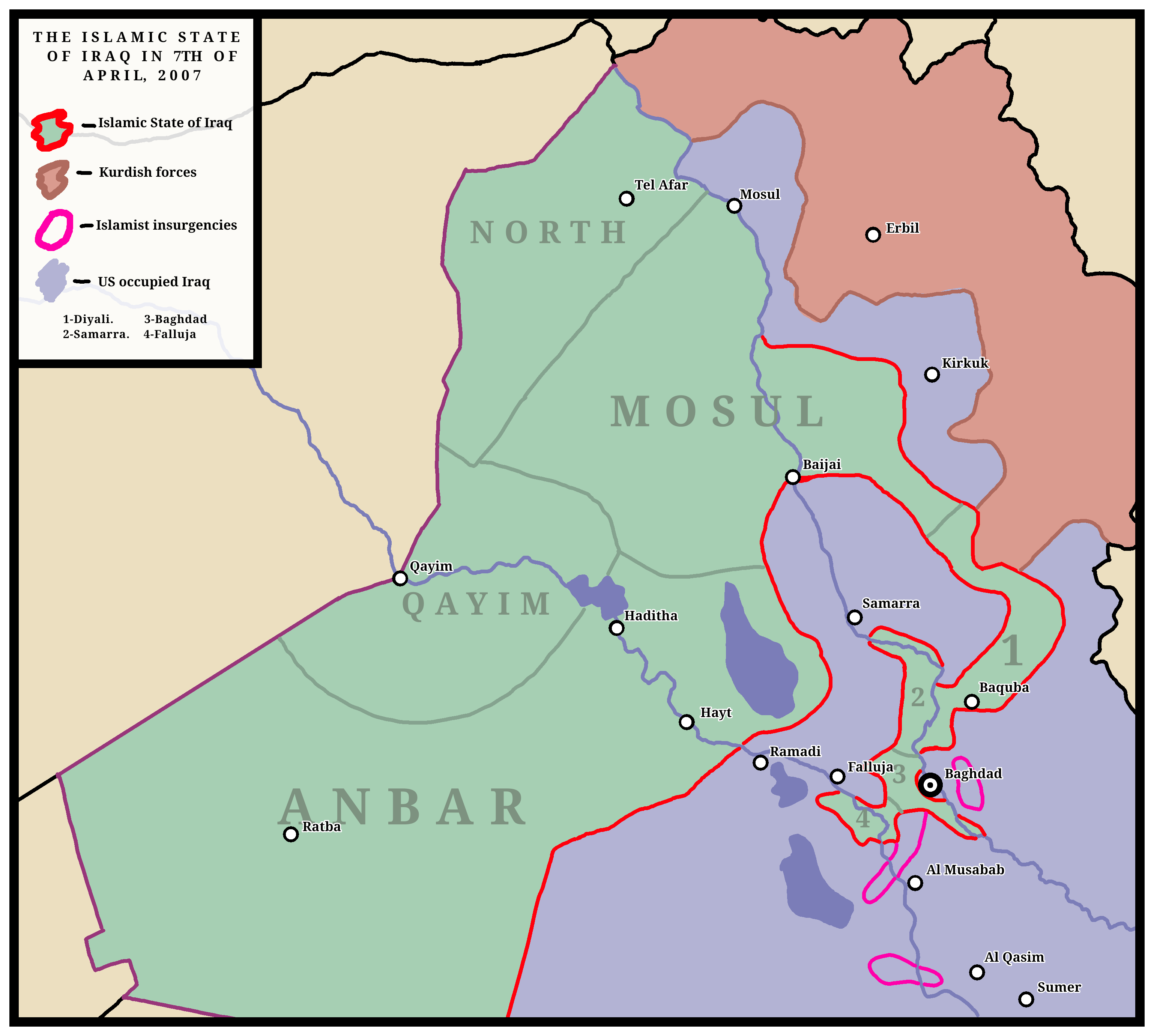
Map of the Islamic State of Iraq and its provinces on 7 April 2007

Following the 2003 invasion, the situation in Iraq deteriorated, and by 2007, the intercommunal violence between Iraqi Sunni and Shia factions was described by the National Intelligence Estimate as having elements of a civil war. In a 10 January 2007 address to the American people, President George W. Bush stated that "80% of Iraq's sectarian violence occurs within 30 miles (48 km) of the capital. This violence is splitting Baghdad into sectarian enclaves, and shaking the confidence of all Iraqis." Two polls of Americans conducted in 2006 found that between 65% and 85% believed Iraq was in a civil war; however, a similar poll of Iraqis conducted in 2007 found that 61% did not believe that they were in a civil war.

In October 2006, the Office of the United Nations High Commissioner for Refugees (UNHCR) and the Iraqi government estimated that more than 370,000 Iraqis had been displaced since the 2006 bombing of the al-Askari Mosque, bringing the total number of Iraqi refugees to more than 1.6 million. By 2008, the UNHCR raised the estimate of refugees to a total of about 4.7 million (~16% of the population). The number of refugees estimated abroad was 2 million (a number close to CIA projections) and the number of internally displaced people was 2.7 million. The estimated number of orphans across Iraq has ranged from 400,000 (according to the Baghdad Provincial Council), to five million (according to Iraq's anti-corruption board). A UN report from 2008 placed the number of orphans at about 870,000. The Red Cross stated in 2009 that Iraq's humanitarian situation remained among the most critical in the world, with millions of Iraqis forced to rely on insufficient and poor-quality water sources.

According to the Failed States Index, produced by Foreign Policy magazine and the Fund for Peace, Iraq was one of the world's top 5 unstable states from 2005 to 2008. A poll of top U.S. foreign policy experts conducted in 2007 showed that over the next 10 years, just 3% of experts believed the U.S. would be able to rebuild Iraq into a "beacon of democracy" and 58% of experts believed that Sunni-Shiite tensions would dramatically increase in the Middle East.

In June 2008, the U.S. Department of Defense reported that "the security, political and economic trends in Iraq continue to be positive; however, they remain fragile, reversible and uneven." In July 2008, the audit arm of the U.S. Congress recommended that the U.S. Government should "develop an updated strategy for Iraq that defines U.S. goals and objectives after July 2008 and addresses the long-term goal of achieving an Iraq that can govern, defend, and sustain itself". Steven Simon, a Senior Fellow for Middle Eastern Studies at the Council on Foreign Relations, wrote in May 2008 that "the recent short-term gains" had "come at the expense of the long-term goal of a stable, unitary Iraq."

After Iraqi security forces took the lead in security operations on 30 June 2009, Iraq experienced a "dramatic reduction in war-related violence of all types ..., with civilian and military deaths down by 80 to 90 percent compared with the same period in 2008."

=== 2008–2011: low-level insurgency ===
In 2010, a low point for the al-Qaeda effort in Iraq, car bombings declined to an average of ten a month and multiple-location attacks occurred only two or three times a year.

== Militant organizations ==
The Iraqi insurgency is composed of at least a dozen major organizations and perhaps as many as 40 distinct groups. These groups are subdivided into countless smaller cells. The American Center for Strategic and International Studies (CSIS) estimated that less than 10% of insurgents are non-Iraqi foreign fighters. According to the Chief of the British General Staff, General Sir Richard Dannatt, speaking in September 2007,

The militants (and I use the word deliberately because not all are insurgents, or terrorists, or criminals; they are a mixture of them all) are well armed – probably with outside help, and probably from Iran. By motivation, essentially, and with the exception of the Al Qaeda in Iraq element who have endeavoured to exploit the situation for their own ends, our opponents are Iraqi Nationalists, and are most concerned with their own needs – jobs, money, security – and the majority are not bad people.

Because of its clandestine nature, the exact composition of the Iraqi insurgency is difficult to determine, but the main groupings are:

- Ba'athists, the supporters of Saddam's former administration including army or intelligence officers, whose ideology is a variant of Pan-Arabism.
- Iraqi nationalists, Iraqis who believe in a strong version of Iraqi self-determination. These policies may not necessarily espouse a Pan-Arab ideology, but rather advocate the country's territorial integrity, including Kuwait and Khuzestan. Historical figures of this movement include the pre-Ba'athist leader of Iraq Abd al-Karim Qasim and his government.
- Iraqi Salafi Islamists, the indigenous armed followers of the Salafi movement, as well as any remnants of the Kurdish Ansar al-Islam: individuals with a Salafi-only policy opposed to non-Salafis though not aligned to one specific ethnic group. Though opposed to the U.S.-led invasion, these groups were not wholly sympathetic towards the former Ba'ath Party as its members included non-Salafis.
- Shia militias, including the southern, Iran-linked Badr Organization, the Mahdi Army, and the central-Iraq followers of Muqtada al-Sadr. These groups neither advocated the dominance of a single ethnic group, nor the traditional ideologies behind the Iraqi state (e.g. these particular Shi'as did not support the capture of Khuzestan or other border areas with Iran, but rather promoted warm relations with Iran's Shia government).
- Foreign Islamist volunteers, including those often linked to al-Qaeda and largely driven by the Salafi/Wahhabi doctrine (the two preceding categories are often lumped as "jihadists");
- Possibly some socialist revolutionaries (such as the Iraqi Armed Revolutionary Resistance, which claimed one attack in 2007).
- Non-violent resistance groups and political parties (not part of the armed insurgency).

=== Arab nationalists ===
==== Ba'athists and pro-Saddamists ====
Ba'ath Party flag

The Ba'athists included former Ba'ath Party officials, the Fedayeen Saddam, the Special Republican Guard and some former agents of the Iraqi intelligence elements and security services, such as the Mukhabarat and the Special Security Organization. Their goal, at least before Saddam's capture, was the restoration of the former Ba'athist government to power. The pre-war organization of the Ba'ath Party and its militias as a cellular structure aided the continued pro-Saddam resistance after the fall of Baghdad, and Iraqi intelligence operatives may have developed a plan for guerrilla war following the toppling of Saddam from power.

Following Saddam's capture, the Ba'athist movement largely faded; its surviving factions were increasingly shifting to either nationalist factions (Iraqi, though not Pan-Arab, such as the ideology of the pre-Ba'athist regime), or Islamist (Sunni or Shia, depending on the actual faith of the individual, though Ba'ath Party policy had been secular).

As the goal of restoring the Ba'ath Party to power was seemingly out of reach, the alternative solution appeared to be to join forces with organisations who opposed the U.S.-led invasion. Many former Ba'athists had adopted an Islamist façade to attract more credibility within the country, and perhaps gain support from outside Iraq. Others, especially following the January 2005 elections, became more interested in politics.

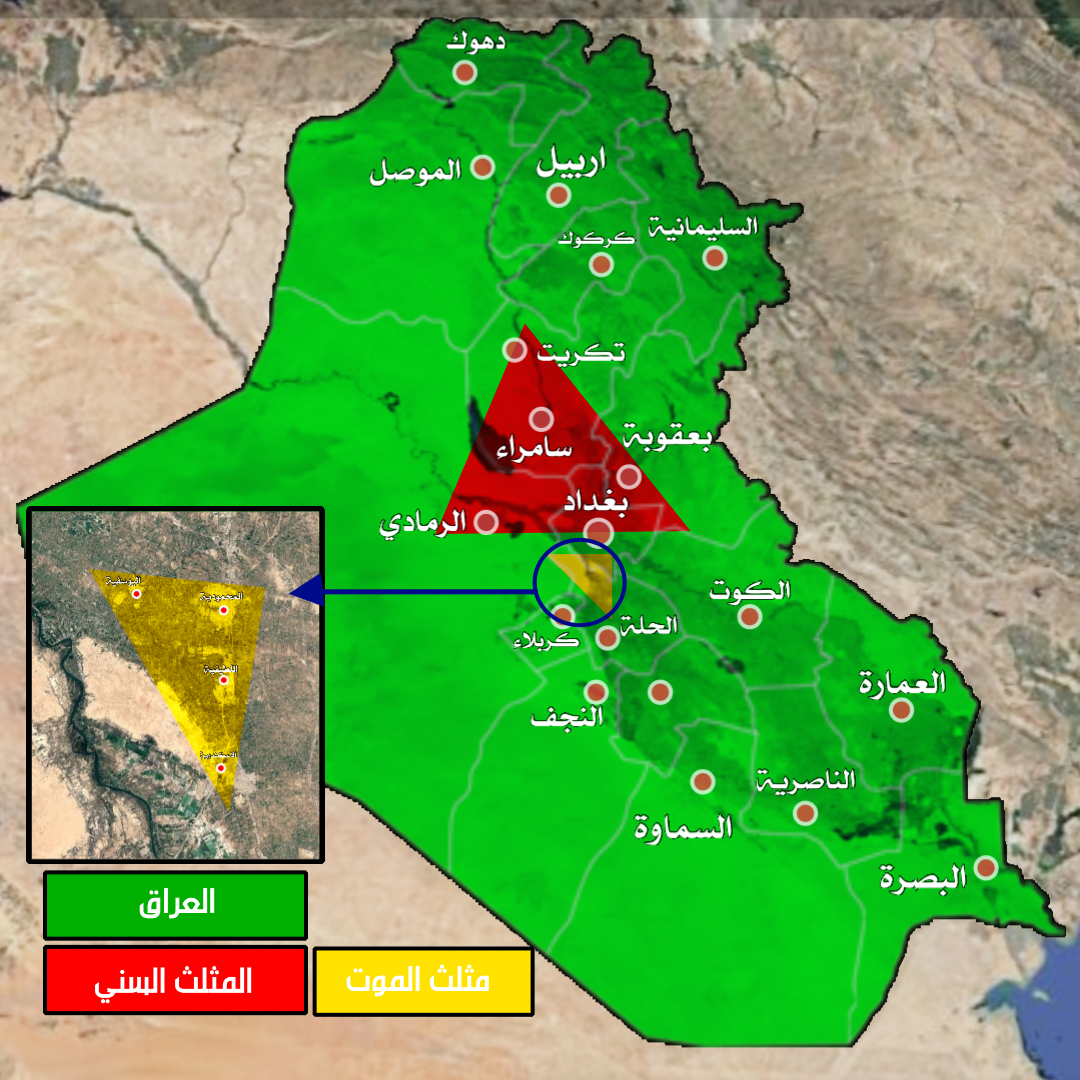
The Sunni Triangle, in red

The fall of Baghdad effectively ended the existence of the Fedayeen Saddam as an organized paramilitary. Several of its members died during the war. A large number survived, however, and were willing to carry on the fight even after the fall of Saddam from power. Many former members joined guerrilla organizations that began to form to resist the U.S-led coalition in Iraq. Some Fedayeen members fled to Syria. By June, an insurgency was underway in central and northern Iraq, especially in an area known as the Sunni Triangle. Some units of the Fedayeen also continued to operate independently of other insurgent organizations in the Sunni areas of Iraq. On 30 November 2003, a U.S. convoy traveling through the town of Samarra in the Sunni Triangle was ambushed by over 100 Iraqi guerillas, reportedly wearing trademark Fedayeen Saddam uniforms.

Following Saddam's execution, Deputy Leader of the Iraqi-cell of the Iraqi-led Ba'ath Party and former Vice President of Iraq Izzat Ibrahim ad-Douri became a leading candidate to succeed him as Leader of the Iraqi Ba'ath Party. Ad-Douri had taken over the running of the Iraqi Ba'ath Party following Saddam's capture and had been endorsed by a previously unknown group calling itself Baghdad Citizens Gathering. On 3 January 2007, the website of the banned Iraqi Ba'ath Party confirmed that he was new leader of the party.

Increasing Syrian influence in the Iraqi Ba'ath Party may well have a major effect on result in a fragmentation of Ba'athist parts of the insurgency.

==== Iraqi nationalists (non-Ba'athist) ====
The Iraqi nationalists were mostly drawn from the Arab regions. Their reasons for opposing the Coalition varied from a rejection of the Coalition presence as a matter of principle, to the failure of the multinational forces to fully restore public services and to quickly restore complete sovereignty.

One notable leader of the insurgency among nationalist Sunnis was a former aide to Saddam, and former regional Ba'ath Party organiser, Mohammed Younis al-Ahmed al-Muwali, who was crossing the Iraq-Syria border, disbursing funds, smuggling weaponry, and organising much of the fighting in central Iraq.

One former minister in the interim government, Ayham al-Samarai, announced the launch in 2005 of "a new political movement, saying he aimed to give a voice to figures from the legitimate Iraqi resistance. 'The birth of this political bloc is to silence the skeptics who say there is no legitimate Iraqi resistance and that they cannot reveal their political face,' he told a news conference." It is unclear what became of this movement.

=== Shia militias ===
==== Government inefficacy and Iranian support ====
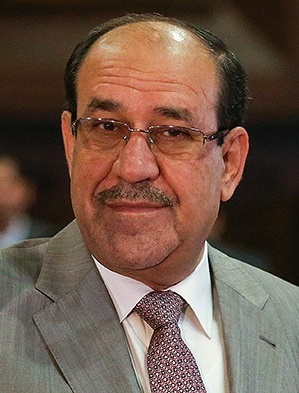
Nouri al-Maliki, the prime minister of Iraq

The Shia militias presented Nouri al-Maliki with perhaps the greatest conundrum of his administration given the capture of Amarah. American officials pressed him hard to disarm the militias and rid the state security forces of their influence.

A 2008 report by the Combating Terrorism Center at West Point based on reports from the interrogations of dozens of captured Shia fighters described an Iranian-run network smuggling Shia fighters into Iran where they received training and weapons before returning to Iraq.

==== Badr Organization ====
One major Shia militia in Iraq is the Badr Organization, the military wing of the Supreme Islamic Council of Iraq. The group was active in areas throughout southern Iraq. The group was formed by the Iranian Government to fight the Saddam-controlled Iraq during the Iran–Iraq War. Originally, the group consisted of Iraqi exiles who were banished from Iraq during the reign of Saddam. After the war ended in 1988, the organization remained in Iran until Saddam was overthrown during the 2003 invasion of Iraq. Following the invasion, the brigade then moved into Iraq, became members of the new Iraq Army, and aided coalition forces in insurgents.

Colonel Derek Harvey stated "that the U.S. military detained Badr assassination teams possessing target lists of Sunni officers and pilots in 2003 and 2004 but did not hold them. Harvey said his superiors told him that 'this stuff had to play itself out' – implying that revenge attacks by returning Shi'ite groups were to be expected. He also said Badr and ISCI offered intelligence and advice to U.S. officials on how to navigate Iraqi politics."

In a letter published by the Coalition in February 2004, an insurgent believed to be al-Zarqawi wrote that jihadists should start an open sectarian war so that Sunnis would mobilize against what would otherwise be a secret war being waged by Shia. The author only specifically pointed to assassinations carried out by the Badr Brigade as an example of this secret war.

In December 2005, the group and their leaders in the Supreme Islamic Council of Iraq participated in parliament elections, under the pro-Shiite coalition known as the United Iraqi Alliance, and managed to get 36 members into the Iraqi Parliament.

The Badr organization supported the government of Nouri al-Maliki.

==== Muqtada al-Sadr's Mahdi Army ====
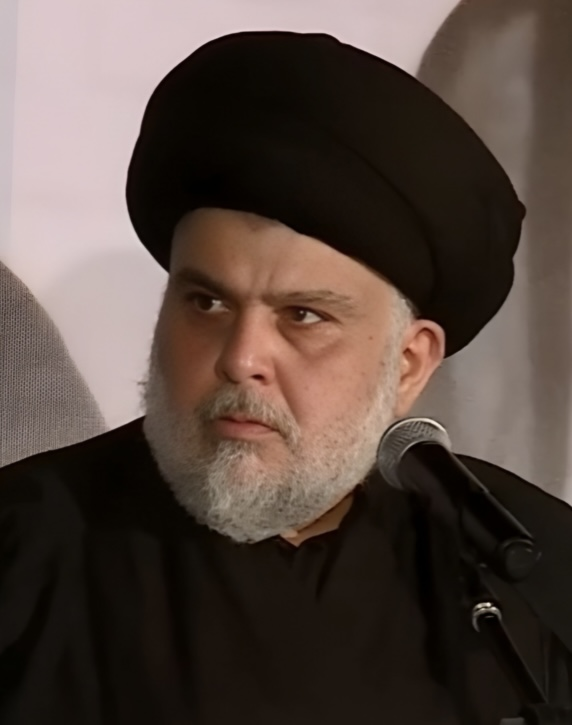
Muqtada al-Sadr, the leader of the Mahdi Army

Supporters of the young Shi'a cleric Muqtada al-Sadr were largely impoverished men from the Shi'a urban areas and slums in Baghdad and the southern Shi'a cities. The Mahdi Army area of operation stretches from Basra in the south to the Sadr City section of Baghdad in central Iraq (some scattered Shi'a militia activity had also been reported in Baquba and Kirkuk, where Shi'a minorities exist).

During his group's active militant phase, Al-Sadr enjoyed wide support from the Iraqi people according to some polls. A poll by the Iraq Center for Research and Studies found that 32% of Iraqis "strongly supported" him and another 36% "somewhat supported" him, making him the second most popular man in Iraq, behind only Ayatollah Ali Al-Sistani. The Mahdi Army is believed to have around 60,000 members.

Following the December 2005 elections in Iraq, Al-Sadr's party got 32 new seats giving him substantial political power in the divided Iraqi Parliament. In January 2006, he used these seats to swing the vote for prime minister to Ibrahim Al-Jaafari, giving Al-Sadr a legitimate stake in the new Iraqi government and allying Al-Jaafari with the cleric.

On 27 November 2006, a senior American intelligence official told reporters that the Iranian-backed group Hezbollah had been training members of the Mahdi Army. The official said that 1,000 to 2,000 fighters from the Mahdi Army and other Shia militias had been trained by Hezbollah in Lebanon, and a small number of Hezbollah operatives had also visited Iraq to help with training. Iran had facilitated the link between Hezbollah and the Shia militias in Iraq, the official said. "There seems to have been a strategic decision taken sometime over late winter or early spring by Damascus, Tehran, along with their partners in ait Lebanese Hezbollah, to provide more support to Sadr to increase pressure on the U.S.," the American intelligence official said.

=== Foreign participants ===
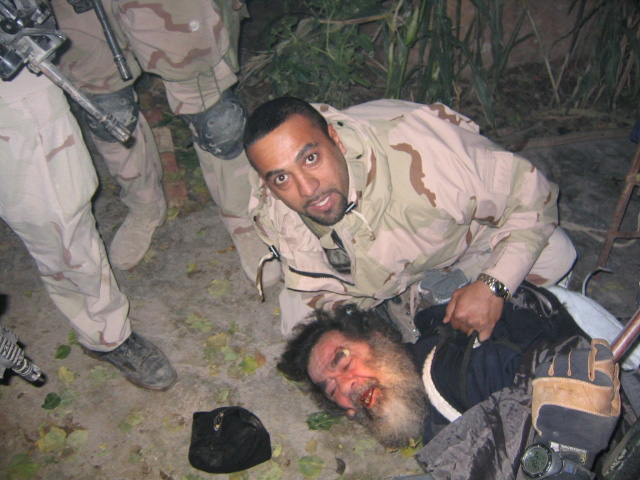
Capture of Saddam Hussein in 2003

When Saddam was captured, several documents were found in his possession. One particular document, which was apparently written after he lost power, appeared to be a directive to his Ba'athist loyalists warning them to be wary of Islamist mujahideen and other foreign Arabs entering the country to join the insurgency. The directive supposedly shows Saddam having concerns that foreign fighters would not share the same objectives as Ba'ath loyalists (i.e. the eventual return of Saddam to power and the restoration of his regime). A U.S. official commenting on the document stressed that while Saddam urged his followers to be cautious in their dealings with other Arab fighters, he did not order them to avoid contact or rule out co-operation. Bruce Hoffman, a Washington counter-terrorism expert stated that the existence of the document underscored the fact that "this is an insurgency cut of many different cloths...[and] everybody's jockeying for their position of power in the future Iraq." Many experts believed that fighters from other countries who had flocked to Iraq to join the insurgents were motivated by animosity toward the United States and the desire to install an Islamic state in place of the Ba'ath Party's secular regime.

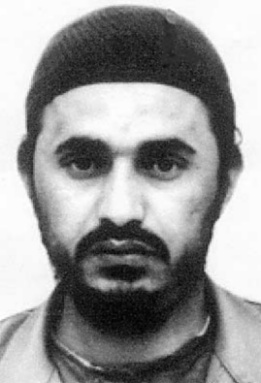
Abu Musab al-Zarqawi, leader of Al-Qaeda in Iraq

Foreign fighters were mostly Arabs from neighboring countries, who entered Iraq primarily through the porous desert borders of Syria and Saudi Arabia, to assist the Iraqi insurgency. Many of these fighters were Wahhabi fundamentalists who saw Iraq as the new "field of jihad" in the battle against U.S. forces. It is generally believed that most are freelance fighters, but a few members of al-Qaeda and the related group Ansar al-Islam were suspected of infiltrating into the Sunni areas of Iraq through the mountainous northeastern border with Iran. The United States and its allies pointed to Jordanian-born Al-Qaeda in Iraq leader Abu Musab al-Zarqawi as the key player in this group. al-Zarqawi was considered the head of an insurgent group called Al-Tawhid Wal-Jihad ("Monotheism and Holy War") until his death on 7 June 2006, which according to U.S. estimates numbers in the low hundreds.

Usage of the term "foreign fighters" received criticism as being Western-centric because, taken literally, the term would encompass all non-Iraqi forces, including Coalition forces. Al-Zarqawi taunted the American forces about the irony of the term: "Who is the foreigner, O cross worshippers? You are the ones who came to the land of the Muslims from your distant corrupt land." (Communiqué of 10 May 2005). His group since announced the formation of the Ansar platoon, a squad of Iraqi suicide bombers, which an AP writer called "an apparent bid to deflect criticism that most suicide bombers in Iraq are foreigners."

While it is not known how many of those fighting the U.S. forces in Iraq are from outside the country, it is generally agreed that foreign fighters made up a very small percentage of the insurgency. Major General Joseph Taluto, head of the 42nd Infantry Division, said that "99.9 per cent" of captured Insurgents are Iraqi. The estimate was confirmed by the Pentagon's own figures; in one analysis of over 1000 insurgents captured in Fallujah, only 15 were non-Iraqi. According to the Daily Telegraph, information from military commanders engaging in battles around Ramadi exposed the fact that out of 1300 suspected insurgents arrested in five months of 2005, none were foreign, although Colonel John L. Gronski stated that foreigners provided money and logistical support: "The foreign fighters are staying north of the [Euphrates] river, training and advising, like the Soviets were doing in Vietnam."

In September 2006, the Christian Science Monitor reported, "It's true that foreign fighters are in Iraq, such as al-Zarqawi. But they are a small minority of the insurgents, say administration critics. Most Iraqi mujahideen are Sunnis who fear their interests will be ignored under Iraq's Shia-dominated government. They are fighting for concrete, local political goals – not the destruction of America." The paper quoted University of Michigan history professor Juan Cole: "If the Iraqi Sunni nationalists could take over their own territory, they would not put up with the few hundred foreign volunteers blowing things up, and would send them away or slit their throats." In 2005, the CSIS concluded that foreign fighters accounted for less than 10% of the estimated 30,000 insurgents and argued that the U.S. and Iraqi Governments were "feeding the myth" that they comprised the backbone of the insurgency.

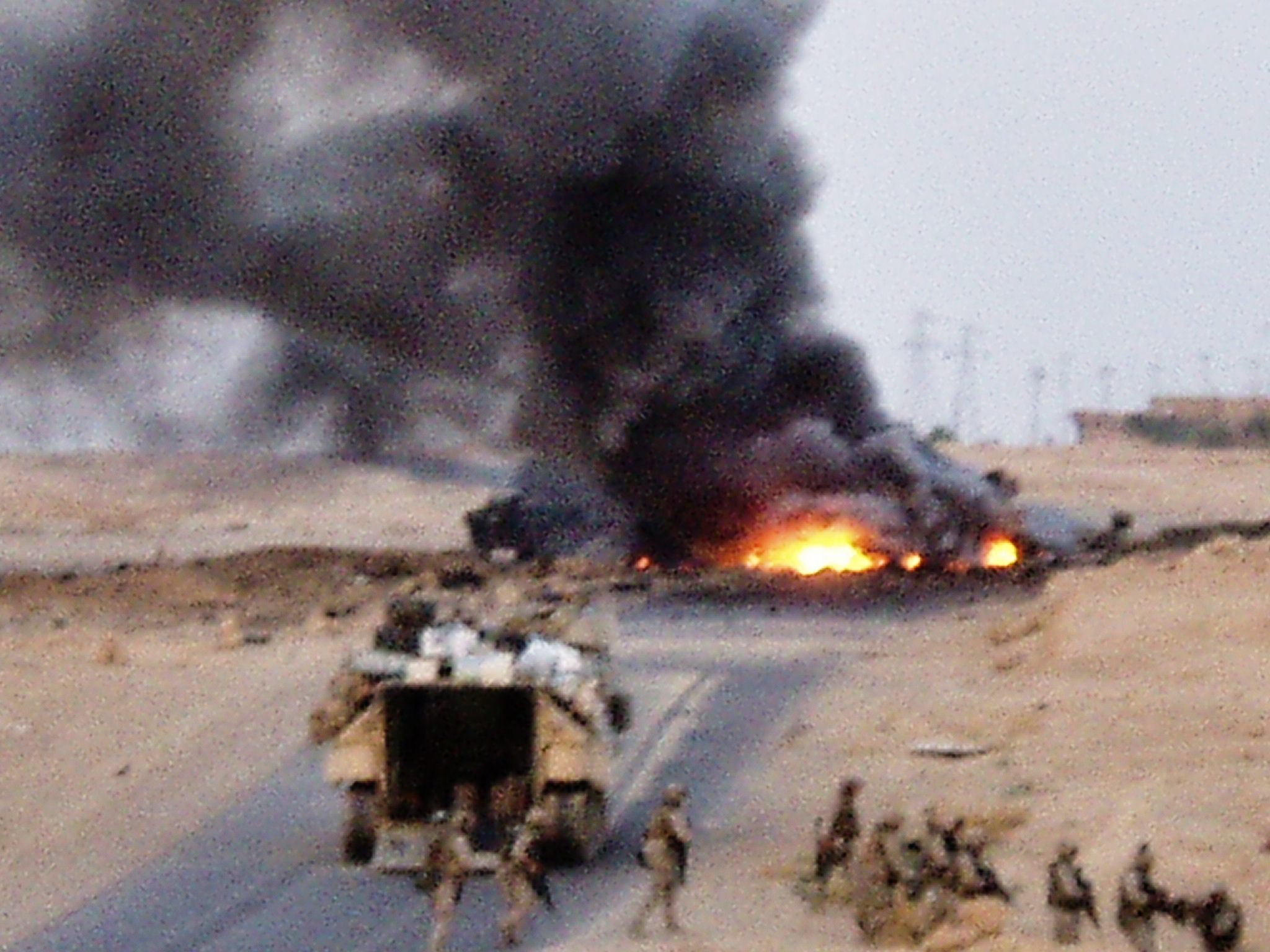
A roadside bombing in Iraq on 3 August 2005

Despite the low numbers of foreign fighters, their presence was confirmed in several ways and Coalition forces believed the majority of suicide bombings were carried out by non-Iraqi foreigners. Kenneth Katzman, a Middle East expert with the Congressional Research Service, stated in June 2005: "I still think 80 percent of the Insurgents, the day-to-day activity, is Iraqi – the roadside bombings, mortars, direct weapons fire, rifle fire, automatic weapons fire...[but] the foreign fighters attract the headlines with the suicide bombings, no question."

In September 2005, Iraqi and U.S. forces conducted a counter-insurgency operation in the predominantly Turkmen town of Tal Afar. An Iraqi Army Captain claimed that Iraqi forces arrested 150 non-Iraqi Arabs (Syria, Sudan, Yemen and Jordan) in the operation; the American army claimed 20% of arrests were foreign combatants, while Donald Rumsfeld on PBS confirmed that foreign combatants were present. However, not all accounts of the battle mention these arrests, and U.S. Army commander Colonel H. R. McMaster said the "vast majority" of Insurgents captured there were "Iraqis and not foreigners." Iraqi journalist Nasir Ali claimed that there were "very few foreign combatants" in Tal Afar and charged "Every time the US army and the Iraqi government want to destroy a specific city, they claim it hosts Arab fighters and Abu Musab al-Zarqawi."

There are allegations that the U.S. government attempted to inflate the number of foreign fighters in order to advance the theory that the insurgency is not a local movement. U.S. Army Specialist Tony Lagouranis spoke about his job identifying many of the bodies after the assault on Fallujah:

We had women and children, old men, young boys. So, you know, it's hard to say. I think initially, the reason that we were doing this was they were trying to find foreign fighters. [U.S. commanders] were trying to prove that there were a lot of foreign fighters in Fallujah. So, mainly, that's what we were going for, but most of them really didn't have I.D.'s but maybe half of them had I.D.'s. Very few of them had foreign I.D.'s. There were people working with me who would – in an effort to sort of cook the books, you know they would find a Koran on the guy and the Koran was printed in Algeria, and they would mark him down as an Algerian, or you know guys would come in with a black shirt and khaki pants and they would say, well, this is the Hezbollah uniform and they would mark him down as a Lebanese, which was ridiculous, but – you know... [Amy Goodman: So, what did you say?] Well, I was only a specialist, so actually, you know, I did say something to the staff sergeant, who was really in charge, and you know, I just got yelled down you know, shot down.

==== Foreign fighters' nationality distribution ====
In July 2007, the Los Angeles Times reported that 45% of all foreign militants targeting U.S. troops and Iraqi civilians and security forces were from Saudi Arabia; 15% were from Syria and Lebanon; and 10% were from North Africa. 50% of all Saudi fighters in Iraq came as suicide bombers. In the six months preceding that article, such bombings killed or injured 4,000 Iraqis.

According to a U.S. military press briefing on 20 October 2005, 312 foreign nationals from 27 countries had been captured in Iraq from April to October 2005. This represented a component of the Iraqi insurgent movement, which also included a nationalist movement encompassing over 30 Shia and Sunni militias.

Foreign insurgents captured in Iraq in the 7-month period April–October 2005:

Nationality	Number
Egypt	78
Syria	66
Sudan	41
Saudi Arabia	32
Jordan	17
United States	15
Iran	13
Palestine	12
Tunisia	10
Algeria	8
Libya	7
Turkey	6
Lebanon	3
India	2
Qatar	2
United Arab Emirates	2
United Kingdom	2
Denmark	1
France	1
Indonesia	1
Ireland	1
Israel	1
Kuwait	1
North Macedonia	1
Morocco	1
Somalia	1
Yemen	1
Total	619

==== Abu Musab al-Zarqawi, al-Qaeda in Iraq, and Sunni jihadists ====
The extent of al-Zarqawi's influence was a source of much controversy. al-Zarqawi was reported killed in action in March 2004 in "a statement signed by a dozen alleged insurgent groups". His Jordanian family then held a funeral service on his behalf, although no body was recovered and positively identified. Iraqi leaders denied the presence of al-Zarqawi in Fallujah prior to the U.S. attack on that city in November 2004. Al-Zarqawi's existence was even questioned.

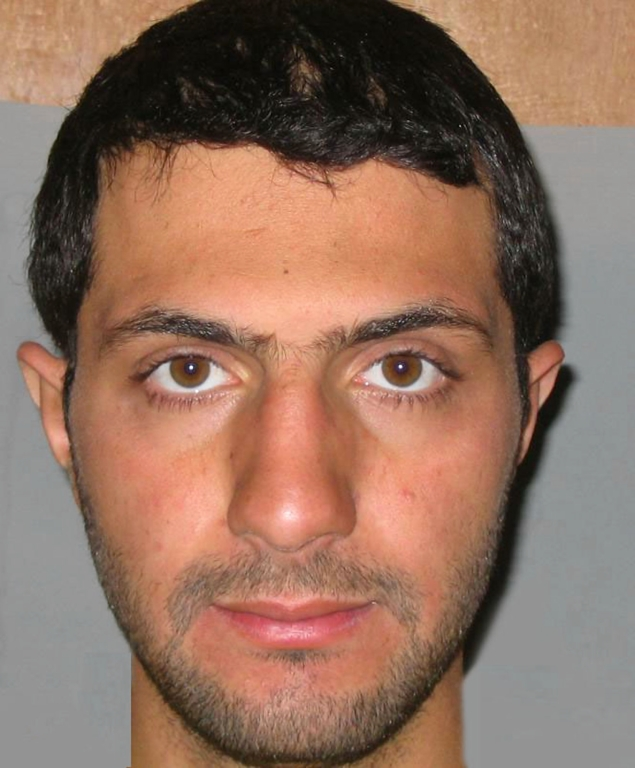
Mugshot of future Syrian president Ahmed al-Sharaa in 2006, after his capture by US forces in Iraq

Involvement of al-Zarqawi in significant terrorist incidents was not usually proven, although his group often claimed it perpetrated bombings. As al-Qaeda is an "opt-in" group (meaning everyone who agrees to some basic Wahhabi moral tenets and the fundamental goals may consider himself a member), it is most likely that "Al-Qaeda in Iraq" was a loose association of largely independent cells united by a common strategy and vision, rather than a unified organization with a firm internal structure.

On 8 June 2006, Iraqi officials confirmed al-Zarqawi was killed by two 500 lb laser-guided bombs dropped from an F-16 the previous evening. Abu Ayyub al-Masri, an Egyptian who was trained in Al-Qaeda camps in Afghanistan, took his place.

A document found in al-Zarqawi's safe house indicates that the guerrilla group was trying to provoke the U.S. to attack Iran in order to reinvigorate the resistance in Iraq and to weaken American forces in Iraq. "The question remains, how to draw the Americans into fighting a war against Iran? It is not known whether American is serious in its animosity towards Iraq, because of the big support Iran is offering to America in its war in Afghanistan and in Iraq. Hence, it is necessary first to exaggerate the Iranian danger and to convince America and the west in general, of the real danger coming from Iran...". The document then outlines 6 ways to incite war between the two nations. Iraqi national security adviser Mowaffak al-Rubaie said the document shows al-Qaeda in Iraq is in "pretty bad shape." He added that "we believe that this is the beginning of the end of al-Qaeda in Iraq."

Journalist Jill Carroll, detailing her captivity in Iraq, described one of her captors, who identified himself as Abdullah Rashid and leader of the Mujahideen Shura Council in Iraq. He told her that; "The Americans were constantly saying that the mujahideen in Iraq were led by foreigners... So, the Iraqi insurgents went to al-Zarqawi and insisted that an Iraqi be put in charge." She continued by stating; "But as I saw in coming weeks, [al-]Zarqawi remained the insurgents' hero, and the most influential member of their council, whatever Nour/Rashid's position... At various times, I heard my captors discussing changes in their plans because of directives from the council and [al-]Zarqawi."

==== Schism between foreign fighters and native Iraqi insurgency ====
Large-scale terrorist attacks against civilians carried out by foreign fighters, as well as the interpretation of Islam that they attempted to impose on the local population in areas under their control, increasingly turned Iraqis against them, in some cases breaking out into open fighting between different groups in the insurgency. There were signs that local Islamist insurgent groups have also increasingly caused the population to turn against them.

Opinions differed on how broad this schism was. Terrorism expert Jessica Stern warned that; "In the run-up to the war, most Iraqis viewed the foreign volunteers who were rushing in to fight against America as troublemakers, and Saddam Hussein's forces reportedly killed many of them." This contradicted Iraqi scholar Mustapha Alani, who said that these foreigners were increasingly welcomed by the public, especially in the former Ba'athist strongholds north of Baghdad.

While some noted an alliance of convenience that existed between the foreign fighters and the native Sunni insurgents, there were signs that the foreign militants, especially those who followed al-Zarqawi, were increasingly unpopular among the native fighters. In the run-up to the December 2005 elections, Sunni fighters were warning al-Qaeda members and foreign fighters not to attack polling stations. One former Ba'athist told Reuters; "Sunnis should vote to make political gains. We have sent leaflets telling al-Qaeda that they will face us if they attack voters." An unnamed Sunni leader was quoted commenting on al-Zarqawi; "[al-]Zarqawi is an American, Israeli and Iranian agent who is trying to keep our country unstable so that the Sunnis will keep facing occupation."

U.S. Army Sgt. McCool shot by an Iraqi insurgent sniper in Ramadi, 2006.

By early 2006, the split between the Sunni groups and the al-Zarqawi-led foreign fighters had grown dramatically, and Sunni forces began targeting al-Qaeda forces for assassination. One senior intelligence official told the Telegraph that al-Zarqawi had fled to Iran as a result of the attacks. In response to al-Qaeda killings in Iraq, Sunni insurgents in al-Anbar province led by former Ba'athist intelligence officer Ahmed Ftaikhan formed an anti-al-Qaeda militia called the Anbar Revolutionaries. All of the militia's core members had relatives who were killed by al-Qaeda in Iraq, and sought to prevent foreign jihadists from entering the country. The group claimed "to have killed 20 foreign fighters and 33 Iraqi sympathizers." The schism became all the more apparent in, when a tape alleged to be from the Mujahedeen Shura Council urged Osama bin Laden to replace al-Qaeda in Iraq's current head with an Iraqi national. The Mujahedeen Shura Council, however, issued a statement shortly afterwards denying the authenticity of the tape.

On 19 July 2007 seven domestic insurgent groups informed journalists in Damascus that they were forming a united front independent of al-Qaeda.

=== Covert Iranian military involvement ===
An estimated 150 Iranian intelligence officers, plus members of Iran's Islamic Revolutionary Guard Corps, were believed to be active inside Iraq at any given time. For more than a year, U.S. troops detained and recorded fingerprints, photographs, and DNA samples from dozens of suspected Iranian agents in a catch and release program designed to intimidate the Iranian leadership. Iranian influence is felt most heavily within the Iraqi Government, the ISF, and Shiite militias.

Although the CPA enforced a 1987 law banning unions in public enterprises, trade unions such as the Iraqi Federation of Trade Unions (IFTU) and Iraq's Union of the Unemployed also mounted effective opposition to the Coalition. However, no trade unions supported the armed insurgents, and unions themselves were subject to attacks from the insurgents. Hadi Saleh of the IFTU was assassinated under circumstances that pointed to a Ba'athist insurgent group on 3 January 2005. Another union federation, the General Union of Oil Employees (GUOE), opposed the Coalition forces in Iraq and called for immediate withdrawal, but was neutral on participation in the election. Whereas the GUOE wanted all Coalition troops out immediately, both the IFTU and the Workers Councils' called for replacement of U.S. and British forces with neutral forces from the UN, the Arab League, and other nations as a transition.

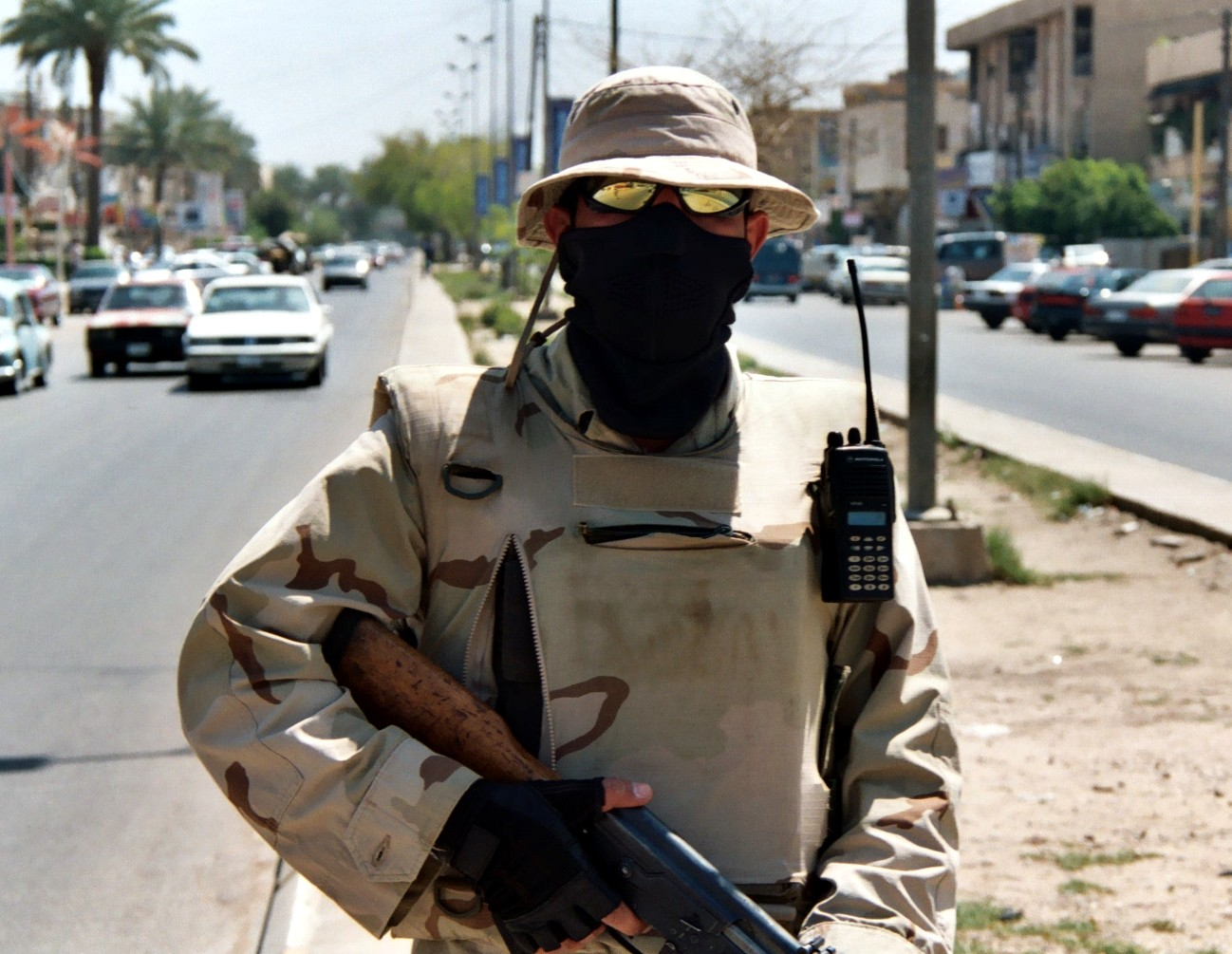
An armed Iraqi interpreter on patrol with U.S. troops on the streets of Baghdad. They became frequent targets of insurgents during the war.

== Tactics ==
The tactics of the Iraqi insurgency varied widely. The majority of militant elements used improvised explosive devices (IEDs), car bombs, kidnappings, suicide attacks, hostage-taking, shootings, assassinations, ambushes, sniper attacks, mortar and rocket strikes and other types of attacks to target Iraqis and U.S. forces with little regard for civilian casualties.

== Awareness of American public opinion ==
A single study has compared the number of insurgent attacks in Iraq to supposedly negative statements in the U.S. media, release of public opinion polls, and geographic variations in access to international media by Iraqis. The purpose was to determine if there was a link between insurgent activity and media reports. The researchers' study suggested it may be possible that insurgent attacks spiked by 5 to 10% after increases in the number of negative reports of the war in the media. The authors believed this may possibly be an "emboldenment effect" and speculated that "insurgent groups respond rationally to expected probability of US withdrawal."

== Iraqi public opinion ==
A series of several polls were conducted to ascertain the position of the Iraqi public further on Al Qaeda in Iraq and the U.S. presence. Some polls found the following:

- Polls suggested the majority of Iraqis disapproved of the presence of Coalition forces.
- A majority of both Sunnis and Shias wanted an end to the U.S. presence as soon as possible, although Sunnis were opposed to the Coalition soldiers being there by greater margins.
- Polls suggested the vast majority of Iraqis supported attacks on insurgent groups with 80% supporting US attacks on Al-Qaeda.

Directly after the invasion, polling suggested that a slight majority supported the US invasion. However, polls conducted in June 2005 suggest that there was some sentiment towards Coalition armies being in Iraq. A 2005 poll by British intelligence said that 45% of Iraqis supported attacks against Coalition forces, rising to 65% in some areas, and that 82% were "strongly opposed" to the presence of Coalition troops. Demands for U.S. withdrawal were also signed onto by one third of Iraq's Parliament. These results were consistent with a January 2006 poll that found an overall 47% approval for attacks on U.S.-led forces. That figure climbed to 88% among Sunnis. Attacks on Iraqi security forces and civilians, however, were approved of by only 7% and 12% of respondents respectively. Polls conducted between 2005 and 2007 showed 31–37% of Iraqi's wanted US and other Coalition forces to withdraw once security was restored, and that 26–35% wanted immediate withdrawal instead.

A September 2006 poll of both Sunnis and Shias found that 71% of Iraqis wanted the U.S. to leave within a year, with 65% favoring an immediate pullout and 77% voicing suspicion that the U.S. wanted to keep permanent bases in Iraq. 61% approved of attacks on U.S. forces. A later poll in March 2007 suggested the percentage of Iraqis who approve of attacks on Coalition forces had dropped to 51%. In 2006 a poll conducted on the Iraqi public revealed that 52% of the ones polled said Iraq was going in the wrong direction, and 61% claimed it was worth ousting Saddam.

Despite a majority having previously been opposed to the US presence, 60% of Iraqis opposed American troops leaving directly prior to withdrawal, with 51% saying withdrawal would have a negative effect.

== Scope and size of the insurgency ==
The most intense Sunni insurgent activity took place in the cities and countryside along the Euphrates river, from the Syrian border town of al-Qaim through Ramadi and Fallujah to Baghdad, as well as along the Tigris river from Baghdad north to Tikrit. Heavy guerrilla activity also took place around the cities of Mosul and Tal Afar in the north, as well as the "Triangle of Death" south of Baghdad, which includes the "-iya" cities of Iskandariya, Mahmudiya, Latifiya, and Yusufiya. Lesser activity took place in several other areas of the country. The insurgents were believed to maintain a key supply line stretching from Syria through al-Qaim and along the Euphrates to Baghdad and central Iraq, the Iraqi equivalent of the Ho Chi Minh trail. A second "ratline" ran from the Syrian border through Tal Afar to Mosul.

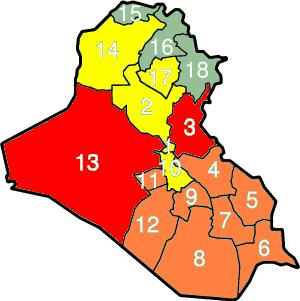
Provincial control of Iraq in September 2011 Coalition control

Although estimates of the total number of Iraqi guerrillas varied by group and fluctuated under changing political climate, some assessments put the present number at between 3,000 and 7,000 fighters, along with numerous supporters and facilitators throughout the Sunni Arab community. At various points, U.S. forces provided estimates on the number of fighters in specific regions. A few are provided here (although these numbers almost certainly have fluctuated):

- Fallujah (mid-2004): 2,000–5,000 In a November 2004 operation, the Fallujah insurgency was destroyed or dispersed, but had staged a comeback in 2005, albeit not to former strength, in the course of 2005–2008 the remainder of the insurgency was defeated in Fallujah and the rest of Al-Anbar province.
- Samarra (August 2011): 1,000+
- Baquba (August 2011 ): 1,000+
- Baghdad (August 2011): 2,000+

Guerilla forces operated in many of the cities and towns of al-Anbar province, due to mostly ineffective Iraqi security forces in this area. There was extensive guerrilla activity in Ramadi, the capital of the province, as well as al-Qa'im, the first stop on an insurgent movement route between Iraq and Syria. In 2006, reports suggested that the Anbar capital Ramadi had largely fallen under insurgent control along with most of the Anbar region, and that as a result, the United States had sent an extra 3,500 marines to reestablish control of the region. In the early part of 2007, the insurgency suffered serious setbacks in Ramadi after they were defeated in the Second Battle of Ramadi in the fall of 2006. With the help of the Anbar Salvation Council, incidents fell from an average of 30 attacks per day in December 2006 to an average of fewer than four in April 2007.

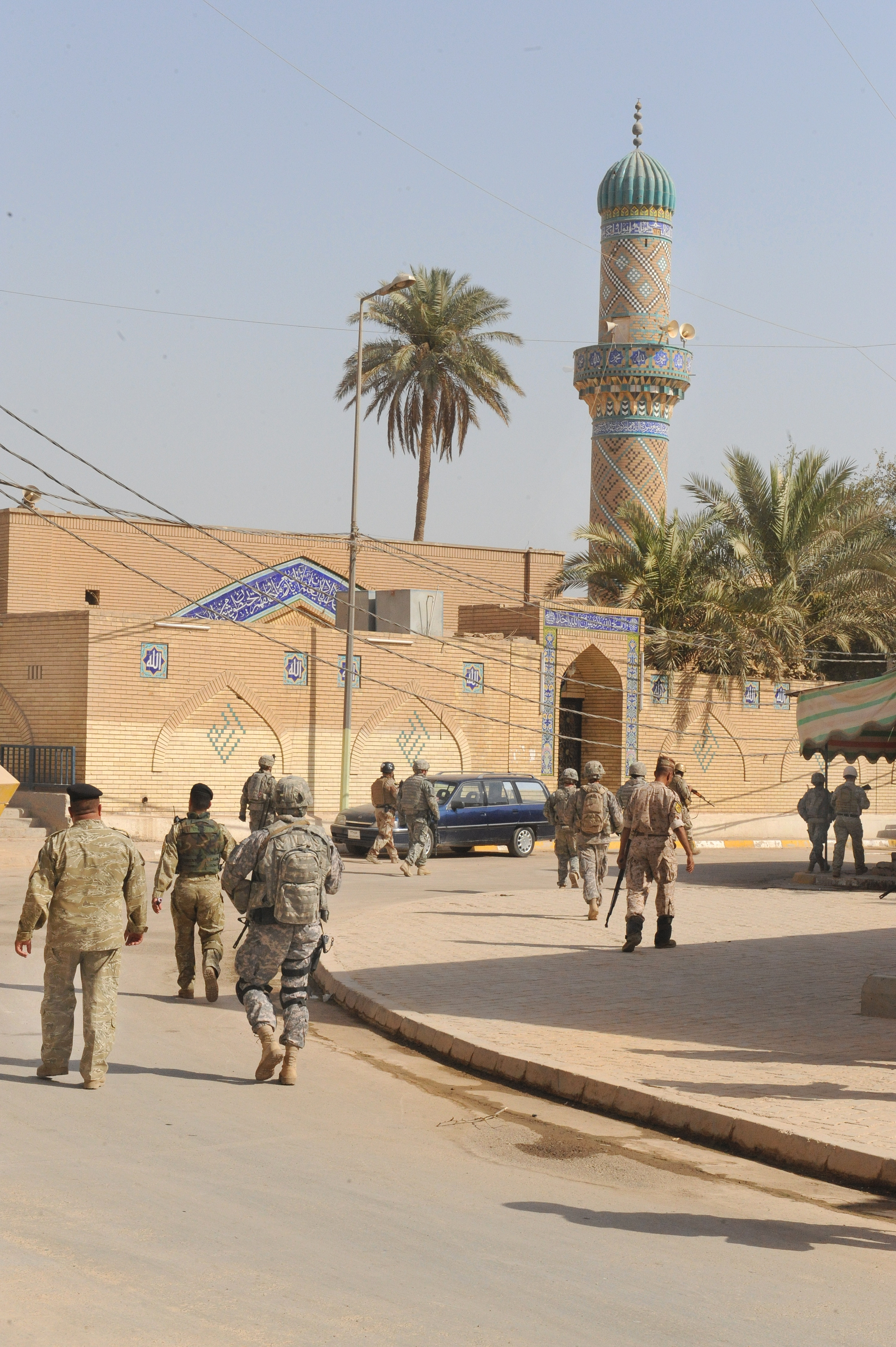
U.S. troops on Haifa Street in Baghdad in 2009

Baghdad was still one of the most violent regions of the country. Even after the 2007 troop surge, more than two-thirds of the violence that took place in Iraq happened in Baghdad, even though the Iraqi Government was in firm control of the entire city. Suicide attacks and car bombs were near daily occurrences in Baghdad. The road from Baghdad to the city airport was the most dangerous in the country, if not the world. Iraqi security and police forces had also been significantly built up in the capital and, despite being constantly targeted, had enjoyed some successes such as the pacification of Haifa Street, which, however, subsequently saw a massive surge of insurgent activity. and after the failed Coalition Operation Together Forward fell under Sunni insurgent control. The U.S. and Iraqi Forces scored many decisive victories in 2007 during the U.S. troop surge, when they launched Operation Law and Order and Operation Phantom Thunder, which broke the back of the insurgency and led to a mass reduction in violence by 80 percent.

Intelligence reports suggested that the base of foreign paramilitary operations moved from Anbar to the religiously and ethnically mixed Diyala province. By July 2007, Diyala had fallen under almost total Insurgent control, and had become the headquarters for the Sunni-dominated Islamic State of Iraq, which issued a proclamation declaring the regional capital Baqubah its capital.

In response to a law allowing for the partitioning of Iraq into autonomous regions, members of the Mutayibeen Coalition (Khalf al-Mutayibeen), a coalition of Sunni insurgent groups including al-Qaeda in Iraq, announced the creation of the Islamic State of Iraq encompassing parts of 6 of Iraq's 18 provinces on 15 October 2006. Yet another show of defiance came on 18 October when Sunni fighters brazenly paraded in Ramadi. Similar parades were held two days later in several towns across western Iraq, two of which occurred within two miles of U.S. military bases.

By October 2006, small radicalized militias had seemed to overshadow the larger and more organized Sunni groups which had composed the insurgency previously. As disagreements emerged in pre-existing groups for reasons ranging from the rift in the Sunni forces between foreign and Iraqi fighters, competition between Mahdi Army and Badr Brigade, and anger over various decisions such as Muqtada al Sadr's agreement to join the political process, dozens of insurgency groups sprung up across the country, though particularly in Baghdad where the U.S. army listed 23 active militias. Residents described the capital as being a patchwork of militia run fiefs. As a result of the insurgency's splintering nature, many established leaders seemed to lose influence. This was particularly illustrated on 19 October, when members of the Mahdi army briefly seized control of Amarah. The attack, while demonstrating the influence of the Madhi army, was believed to have originated as a result of contention between local units of the Madhi army and the allegedly Badr brigade run security forces, and the timing suggested that neither Al Sadr nor his top commanders had known or orchestrated the offensive.

At the height of the war, insurgents launched hundreds of attacks each month against Coalition forces. Overtime, insurgency groups moved to more sophisticated methods of attacks, such as Explosively formed penetrators, and infrared lasers, which could not be easily jammed. These attacks contributed to the rate of civilian casualties, which in turn reduced Iraq's public safety, as well as the reliability of infrastructure.

As of 29 January 2009 4,235 U.S. soldiers, 178 British soldiers and 139 soldiers from other nations (allied with the coalition) died in Iraq. 31,834 U.S. soldiers had been wounded. Coalition forces did not usually release death counts. As such, the exact number of insurgents killed by the Coalition or Iraqi forces is unknown. Through September 2007, more than 19,000 insurgents were reported to have been killed in fighting with Coalition forces, and tens of thousands of Iraqi "suspected civilians" were captured (including 25,000 detainees in U.S. military custody at the time), according to military statistics released for the first time.

== American-led counter-insurgency operations ==
Video footage taken from the gun camera of an Apache helicopter showing the killing of people whom the U.S. military regarded as suspected Iraqi insurgents. 1 December 2003, near al-Taji.

Over 500 counterinsurgency operations were undertaken by the U.S.-led Coalition or the Iraqi government. These included Operation Option North and Operation Bayonet Lightning in Kirkuk, Operation Desert Thrust, Operation Abilene and Operation All American Tiger throughout Iraq, Operation Iron Hammer in Baghdad and Operation Ivy Blizzard in Samarra – all in 2003; Operation Market Sweep, Operation Vigilant Resolve and Operation Phantom Fury in Fallujah in 2004; Operation Matador in Anbar, Operation Squeeze Play and Operation Lightning in Baghdad, Operation New Market near Haditha, Operation Spear in Karabillah and the Battle of Tal Afar – all in 2005; Operation Swarmer in Samarra and Operation Together Forward in Baghdad in 2006; and Operation Law and Order in Baghdad, Operation Arrowhead Ripper in Baqouba and Operation Phantom Strike throughout Iraq – all in 2007.

== Aftermath ==
=== 2011–2013: American withdrawal and renewed insurgency ===
Iraqi attacks since U.S. withdrawal relates to the last stage of violent terror activities engaged by Iraqis, primarily radical Sunni and Shia insurgent groups against the central government, and the sectarian warfare between various factions within Iraq in the aftermath of the U.S. withdrawal. The events of post-U.S. withdrawal violence succeeded the previous insurgency in Iraq (prior to 18 December 2011), but showed increasingly violent patterns, raising concerns that the surging violence might slide into another civil war.

== See also ==
- Challenge Project
- Iraqi civil war (2006–2008)
- Iraqi insurgency (2011–2013)
- Consolation payment
- Fallujah during the Iraq War
- Juba (sniper)
- List of revolutions and rebellions
- Iraq War order of battle, 2009
- USA kill or capture strategy in Iraq
- USA list of most-wanted Iraqis
- Taliban insurgency
- Joint Special Operations Command Task Force in the Iraq War
- Task Force ODIN
- Executive Order 13303

Chronology:

- History of Iraq (2003–11)
  - 2003 in Iraq
  - 2004 in Iraq
  - 2005 in Iraq
  - 2006 in Iraq
  - 2007 in Iraq
  - 2008 in Iraq
    - 2008 Mosul offensive
  - 2009 in Iraq
  - 2010 in Iraq
  - 2011 in Iraq

== Sources ==
- Bishku, Michael B. (2018), Israel and the Kurds: A Pragmatic Relationship in Middle Eastern Politics, vol. 41, Journal of South Asian and Middle Eastern Studies
