= M14 =

M14, M-14, or M.14 most often refers to:

- M14 rifle (or the mini version)
- Mk 14 Enhanced Battle Rifle

M14, M-14, or M.14 may also refer to:

== Roads ==
- Highway M14 (Ukraine)
- M-14 (Michigan highway), connecting Ann Arbor and Detroit
- M14 (New York City bus)
- M14 (Bloemfontein), South Africa
- M14 (Cape Town), South Africa
- M14 (East London), South Africa
- M14 (Johannesburg), South Africa
- M14 (Port Elizabeth), South Africa
- M14 (Pretoria), South Africa
- M14 road (Zambia)
- M14 road (Malawi)
- M-14 motorway (Pakistan), Pakistan

== Military ==
- Directorate 14 or M14, a branch of the Iraqi Intelligence Service
- M14 mine, a landmine
- AN/M14 incendiary grenade
- M-14 (rocket), an artillery rocket
- M14 rifle, US military rifle
- M14 Half-track, a self-propelled anti-aircraft gun

== Vehicles ==
- Chery M14, a concept car; See Auto Shanghai
- Macchi M.14, an Italian fighter aircraft of 1918
- Miles M.14 Magister, a 1937 British trainer aircraft
- Noble M14, a British prototype sports car
- Vedeneyev M14P, a Russian aircraft engine
- Watercat M14-class landing craft, a military ship class

== Other uses ==
- M14 (cell line), a human melanoma cell line
- March 14 Alliance, an anti-Syrian Lebanese coalition
- Messier 14, a globular cluster in the constellation Ophiuchus
- Mercedes-AMG F1 M14 E Performance, a 2023-spec Formula One power unit
- M14, a size of ISO metric screw thread
- Magic 2014, a Magic: The Gathering expansion set
- Samsung Galaxy M14 5G, a smartphone
