= Consolation (disambiguation) =

Consolation is the act of offering comfort to someone who has suffered loss.

Consolation(s) may also refer to:

== Music ==
- Consolation (band), a Dutch death metal/grindcore band
- Consolation (Kalafina album), 2013
- Consolation (album), by Pomme, 2022
- Consolation (EP), by Protomartyr, 2018
- "Consolation" (song), by the Hep Stars, 1966
- "Consolation", a song by Vertical Horizon from Echoes from the Underground, 2013
- Consolations (Liszt), six piano pieces by Liszt, 1850

== Other uses ==
- Consolation (novel), a 2020 novel by Garry Disher
- Awake!, formerly Consolation, a Jehova's Witnesses magazine
- Seneca's Consolations, three works by Seneca c. 40–45 AD

== See also ==
- Basilica and National Shrine of Our Lady of Consolation
- Consolation payment, to relatives of civilians who have died accidentally
- Consolation prize
