= Federation of Workers Councils and Unions in Iraq =

Union federation in Iraq

- Founded: 2003
- Headquarters: Baghdad, Iraq
- Location: Iraq
- Affiliations: Independent

The Federation of Workers Councils and Unions in Iraq (FWCUI) is the second largest union federation in Iraq.

The federation was formed in December 2003 by members of the Union of the Unemployed of Iraq, which is connected to the Worker Communist Party of Iraq as a left-wing alternative to the now defunct Iraqi Federation of Trade Unions (IFTU). Between 2004 and 2005, the Iraqi Communist Party-affiliated IFTU was the only legally recognized union federation in Iraq; it merged with the General Federation of Trade Unions and the General Federation of Iraqi Trade Unions in 2005 to form the General Federation of Iraqi Workers or the Iraqi Workers' Federation.

- This "legal recognition" of one union federation over another was a violation of the International Labour Organisation's Convention 87 on Freedom of Association and Protection of the Right to Organise, to which Iraq and all the occupying powers are signatory.(, look for Convention 87; Freedom of Association and Protection of the Right to Organise Convention, 1948.)

The FWCUI opposes both the U.S.-led occupation of Iraq and the Islamist elements of the Iraqi insurgency, and it is often repressed by both the foreign and Islamist forces. Many anti-war movements around the world have provided venues for FWCUI speaker tours. A third labor formation known as the Federation of Oil Unions in Iraq also exists.

The FWCUI's members have led a number of strikes, and are particularly strong around the Basra region.
