= General Federation of Trade Unions =

General Federation of Trade Unions is the name of several union federations:

- General Federation of Trade Unions (UK)
- General Federation of Trade Unions (Pakistan)
- General Federation of Trade Unions of Korea
- Palestine General Federation of Trade Unions
- General Federation of Trade Unions (Syria)
- General Federation of Trade Unions (Iraq)
