= Hadi Saleh =

Iraqi trade unionist (1949–2005)

- هادى صالح
- Born: 1949
- Died: January 4, 2005 (aged 55–56); Baghdad, Iraq
- Cause of death: Torture and murder by insurgents
- Occupation: Trade unionist
- Years active: 1960s–2005
- Organization: Iraqi Federation of Trade Unions
- Known for: International Secretary of the Iraqi Federation of Trade Unions
- Movement: Workers' Democratic Trade Union Movement

Hadi Saleh (Arabic: هادى صالح, 1949 – January 4, 2005) was an Iraqi trade unionist and was International Secretary of the Iraqi Federation of Trade Unions.

Saleh had been involved in Iraqi trade unions for much of his adult life, and was sentenced to death in 1969 because of his involvement in independent unions after the 1968 Ba'ath coup. He served five years in jail before the sentence was commuted, and he fled to Sweden, where he lived as a refugee until after the 2003 invasion of Iraq.

While in Sweden, Saleh helped form the Workers' Democratic Trade Union Movement, an underground organization in Iraq.

Following his return to Iraq, he helped found the Iraqi Federation of Trade Unions in May 2003, and was elected onto its executive committee.

On January 4, 2005, his Baghdad home was broken into, and he was tortured and killed by Iraqi insurgents. It has been suggested that the killing bore the hallmarks of an action by the former Iraqi security services, and that it was intended to undermine the growth of the Iraqi trade union movement.
