= Directorate 14 =

Branch of the Iraqi Intelligence Service under President Saddam Hussein

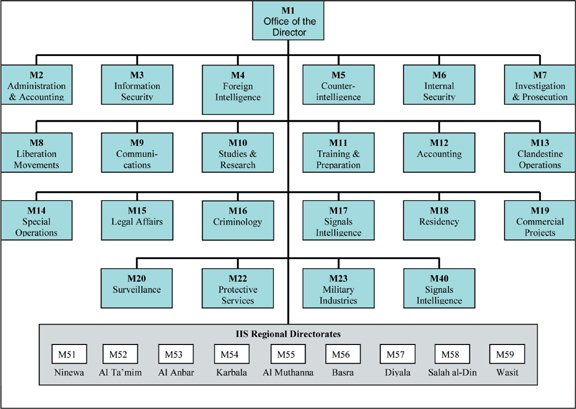
M14's location in the Iraqi Intelligence Service organization

Directorate 14, also referred to as the Directorate of Special Operations or M14, was a branch of the Iraqi Intelligence Service under President Saddam Hussein. Headquartered in Salman Pak, this branch was one of the largest and most important directorates within the Iraqi Intelligence Service, and was responsible for the most secret and sensitive operations undertaken outside of Iraq, including espionage and assassination. Directorate 14 was also responsible for the training of officers for operations of this nature. It is also reported to have occasionally worked with the Iranian opposition group, the People's Mujahedin of Iran. The last known director for Directorate 14 was Muhammad Khudayr Sabah Al Dulaymi, and according to the Iraqi National Congress, was previously led by Brig Nouri Al Douri (Abu Ibrahim) from Jadriya.

Before the 2003 invasion of Iraq, Directorate 14 was entrusted with oversight of the Challenge Project. According to the Iraq Survey Group report:

M14, directed by Muhammad Khudayr Sabah Al Dulaymi, was responsible for training and conducting special operations missions. It trained Iraqis, Palestinians, Syrians, Yemeni, Lebanese, Egyptian, and Sudanese operatives in counterterrorism, explosives, marksmanship, and foreign operations at its facilities at Salman Pak. Additionally, M14 oversaw the “Challenge Project,” a highly secretive project regarding explosives. Sources to date have not been able to provide sufficient details regarding the “Challenge Project.”

The report also stated that the Directorate was engaged in assassination attempts, including those of US President George H. W. Bush and Husayn Kamil, an Iraqi defector. It may have also been behind the assassination of Talib Al Suheil, an Iraqi dissident killed in 1994 in Beirut.

Soon after the 2003 invasion, Newsweek reported that a memo from the Directorate, dated October 29, 2002, raised the possibility that they had an informant inside the US intelligence community before the war: "one of our sources in the United States, with a high level of reliability, says the CIA and the so-called opposition have a joint plan to bring 'quislings' to Iraq from the north and south to gather information and await future missions. Our informant will be one of them."

== Structure ==
According to the Iraq Survey Group:

- Special Operations Department, composed of a foreign and a domestic section, performed government-sanctioned assassinations inside or outside of Iraq.
- The “Tiger Group” was similar to Special Operations, except that it was primarily composed of suicide bombers.
- The Training Department provided training for all IIS officers going abroad.
- The Counterterrorism Department handled counterterrorism activities in Iraq and at embassies; reportedly, it disarmed terrorists hijacking a Sudanese airliner from Saddam International Airport.
- The Administrative Department provided support services such as administration, finances, communications, and logistics.
- The Anti-Iranian Department infiltrated operatives into Iran for intelligence collection and operated against Iranian groups attempting to enter Iraq.
