= Operation Spear =

2005 US military action in Karabillah, Iraq

- Part of the Post-invasion Iraq
Date	June 2005
Location	Karabillah, Iraq

Belligerents
United States; New Iraqi Army	Iraqi Insurgents

Operation Spear was a United States operation, conducted by U.S. Marines, in Karabillah, Iraq, announced in June 2005. The main objective was to provide proof of foreign fighters, mainly Syrian, passing through the borders between Iraq and Syria. Marines from Lima Company, 3rd Battalion, 25th Marines (3/25), Kilo and Weapons Companies, 3rd Battalion, 2nd Marines (3/2) took part. Charlie Company, 2nd Light Armored Reconnaissance Battalion played a key part in the operation. 1st platoon Charlie company 2nd LAR advanced deep into the outskirts the town, ahead of the main force overnight. They held a support by fire position throughout the morning under heavy fire.

Operation Spear began on 17 June 2005. A force of about 1,000 marines and sailors from Regimental Combat Team 2 and Iraqi soldiers form 1st Company, 2nd Battalion, 4th Brigade took part in the offensive. The operation took place around Karabilah near the Syrian border. Coalition leaders said that foreign fighters were using the area to infiltrate into Iraq. In the city they would receive help from other anti-Iraqi forces. From the city foreigners would spread around Iraq. They were said to be part of a terror network led by Abu Musab al-Zarqawi.

The operation was designed to root out anti-Iraqi and anti-coalition forces and destroying some of their support system. In clearing out the city coalition forces found four Iraqi hostages held in a bunker in the center of the city. The forces also found and destroyed several weapons caches and improvised explosive devices. While clearing the city, marines and Iraqi forces came under heavy fire but managed to fight off the insurgents with only one friendly killed in action. Air strikes were called in on three buildings which were subsequently destroyed. There were said to be four civilian casualties who were evacuated to military hospitals.

It followed Operation Lightning and was followed by Operation Dagger.
