= Justice M. Chambers =

American lawyer (1908–1982)

Justice Marion Chambers
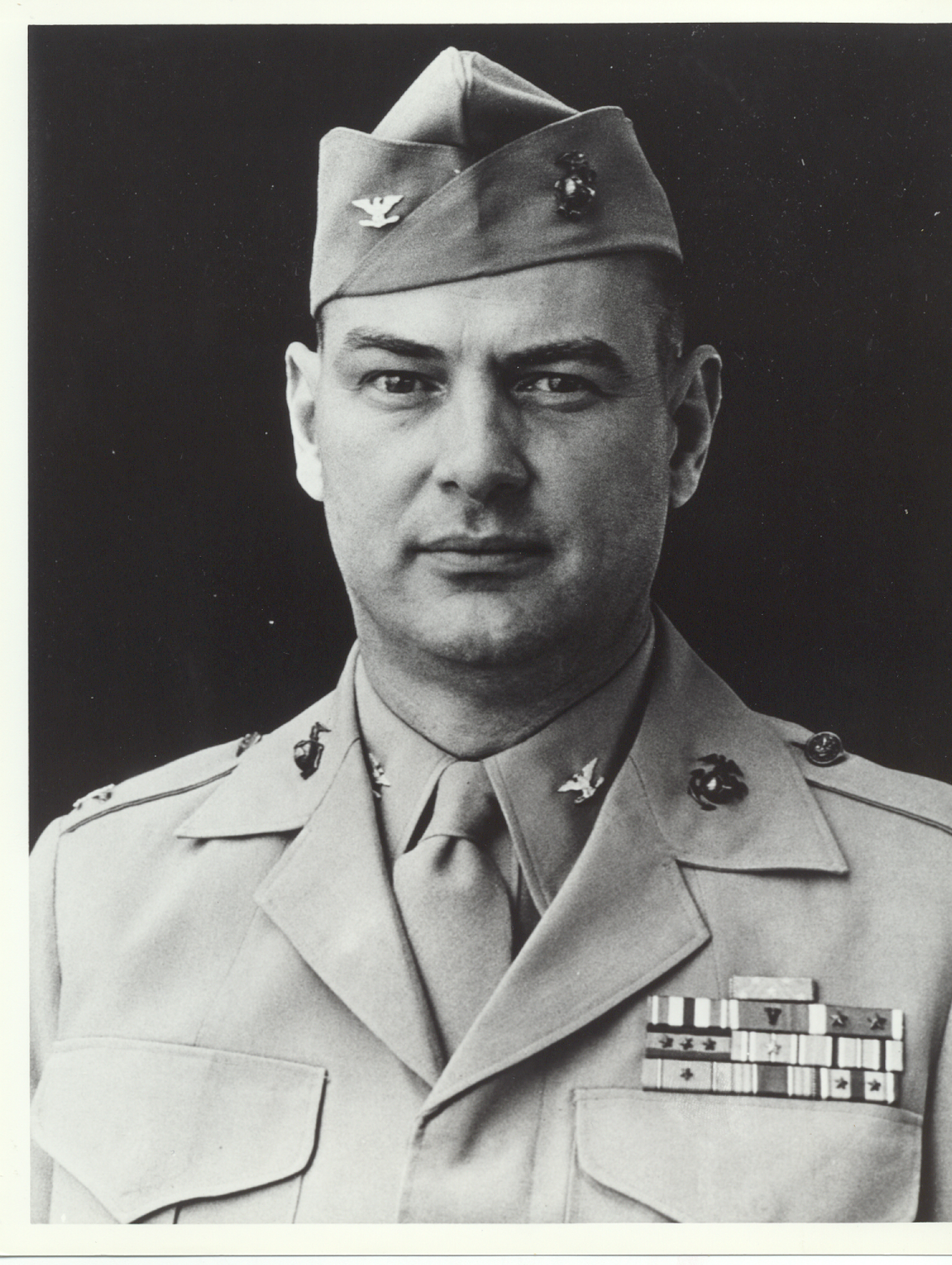
- Colonel Justice M. Chambers, Medal of Honor recipient
- Born: February 2, 1908; Huntington, West Virginia, U.S.
- Died: July 29, 1982 (aged 74); Bethesda, Maryland, U.S.
- Burial place: Arlington National Cemetery
- Education: Marshall University
- Military career
- Allegiance: United States
- Branch: United States Marine Corps
- Service years: 1928–1930 (USN), 1930–1946 (USMC)
- Rank: Colonel
- Nickname: Jumping Joe
- Commands: 3rd Battalion, 25th Marines
- Conflicts: World War II; Battle of Iwo Jima
- Awards: Medal of Honor (1945); Silver Star; Legion of Merit; Purple Heart
- Other work: Staff advisor for the Senate Armed Services Committee

Colonel Justice Marion Chambers (February 2, 1908 – July 29, 1982) was a United States Marine Corps officer who received the Medal of Honor for actions in World War II during the Iwo Jima campaign.

== Biography ==
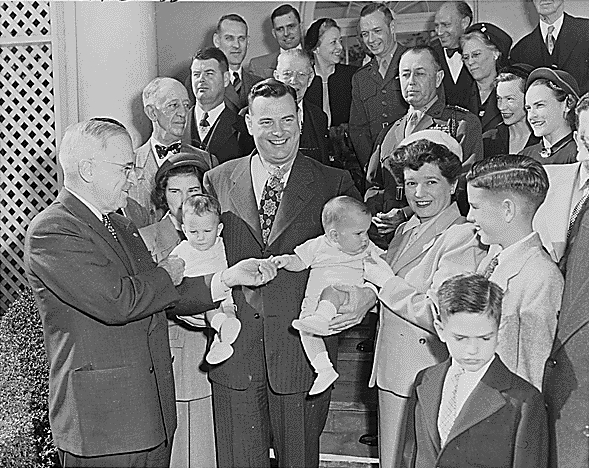
Chambers with his family and President Harry Truman during his Medal of Honor presentation ceremony. A few hours later, two Puerto Rican nationalists attempted to assassinate Truman across the street at Blair House.

Chambers was born February 2, 1908, in Huntington, West Virginia. He went to school there and completed three years at Marshall College in Huntington. He attended George Washington University for two years and National University, both in Washington, D.C., where he obtained his law degree.

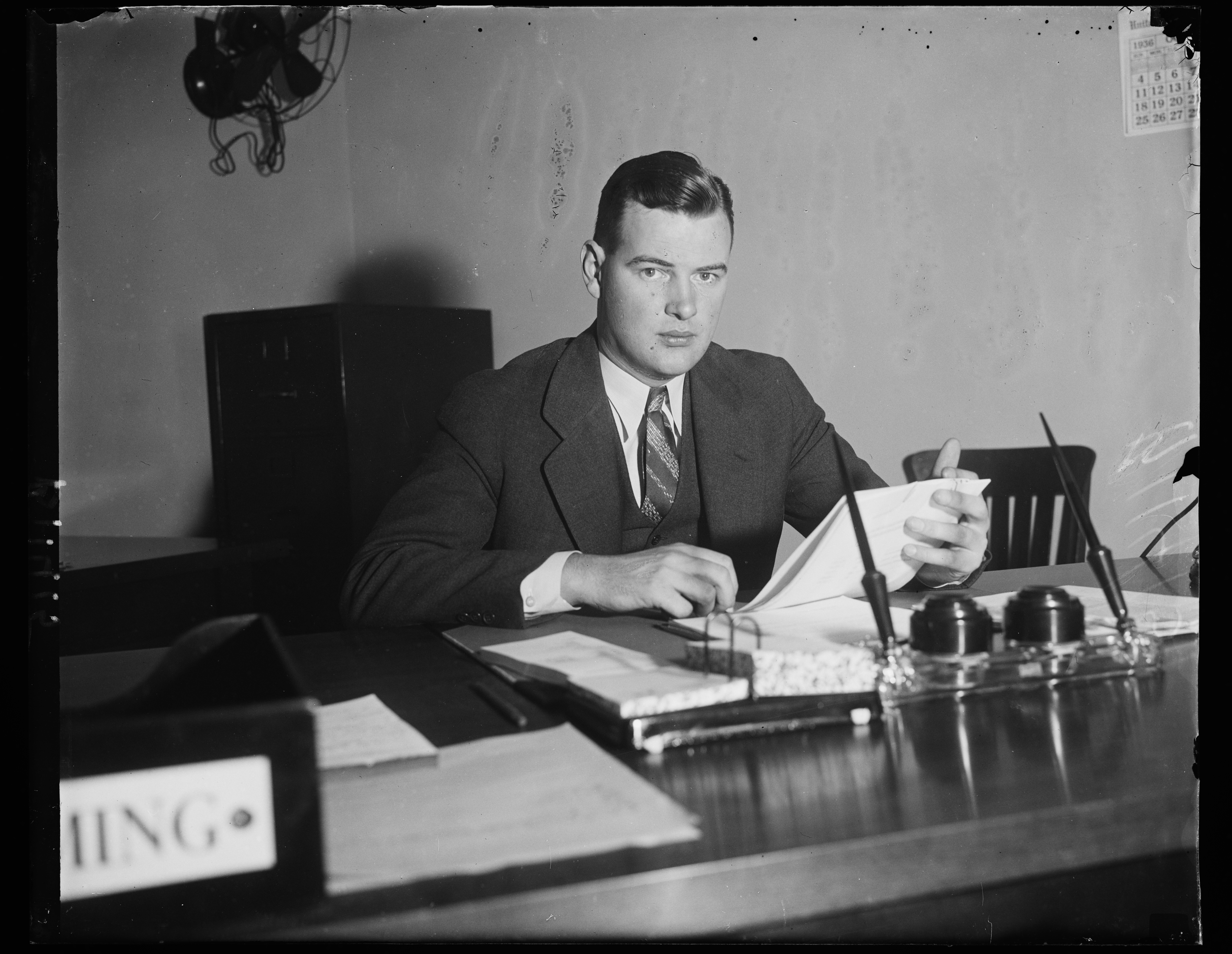
Chambers in 1936

Following the completion of two years enlistment in the Naval Reserve in 1930, he joined the Marine Corps Reserve as a private. He was commissioned in 1932 and continued his studies toward promotion. He was a major, attending summer camp, when Washington's 5th Battalion was called up in 1940. He was well known for the enthusiasm and energy with which he trained his men.

Serving with the 1st Marine Raider Battalion, Lieutenant Colonel Chambers received the Silver Star for evacuating the wounded and directing the night defense of a battalion aid station on Tulagi, where he himself was a patient already seriously wounded. Then "Major" Chambers' wounding would be later mentioned in "Pua Pua" written by Oscar Brand and released on his album "Tell it to the Marines."

He commanded the 3rd Battalion, 25th Marines in the Roi-Namur campaign. On Saipan he suffered blast concussion, but returned to lead his battalion there and on Tinian. He had trained his command so thoroughly and his leadership was so conspicuous that he was awarded the Legion of Merit with Combat "V."

Chambers commanded the 3rd Battalion, 25th Marines in the Iwo Jima landing on February 19, 1945. His sector was beneath high ground from which heavy enemy fire raked the whole landing beach. "Capture of the high ground," the Medal of Honor recommendation stated, "... was essential to the success of the D-Day operations. It is an established fact that had it not been done, it would have constituted a most serious threat to the subsequent operations of the 5th Amphibious Corps."

The 3rd Battalion lost more than half its officers and nearly one-half its enlisted strength on D-Day. But by "fearless disregard for his own life" and leading his depleted battalion "by example rather than command," Chambers won the key heights and anchored the right flank of the Marines' position.

On the fourth day, directing the Marines' first rocket barrage and exposed to the enemy's main line of resistance, Chambers fell under enemy machine-gun fire. His wounds were so serious that he was medically retired and, because he had been specially commended for performance of duty in combat, he was promoted to colonel.

Presentation of the Medal of Honor was made at the White House by President Harry S. Truman on November 1, 1950. (Later that same day, two Puerto Rican nationalists attempted to assassinate Truman across the street at Blair House.) Chambers had been recommended for the award on April 7, 1945, following his evacuation, seriously wounded, from Iwo Jima. He initially received the Navy Cross for his actions, but upon re-examination of the original recommendation with additional evidence, his award was upgraded to the Medal of Honor a few years later.

Chambers retired from the U.S. Marine Corps Reserve January 1, 1946. After his retirement, he served as staff advisor for the Senate Armed Services Committee.

Chambers was appointed in 1962 by President John F. Kennedy to the post of deputy director of the Office of Emergency Planning, where he served with distinction until his retirement.

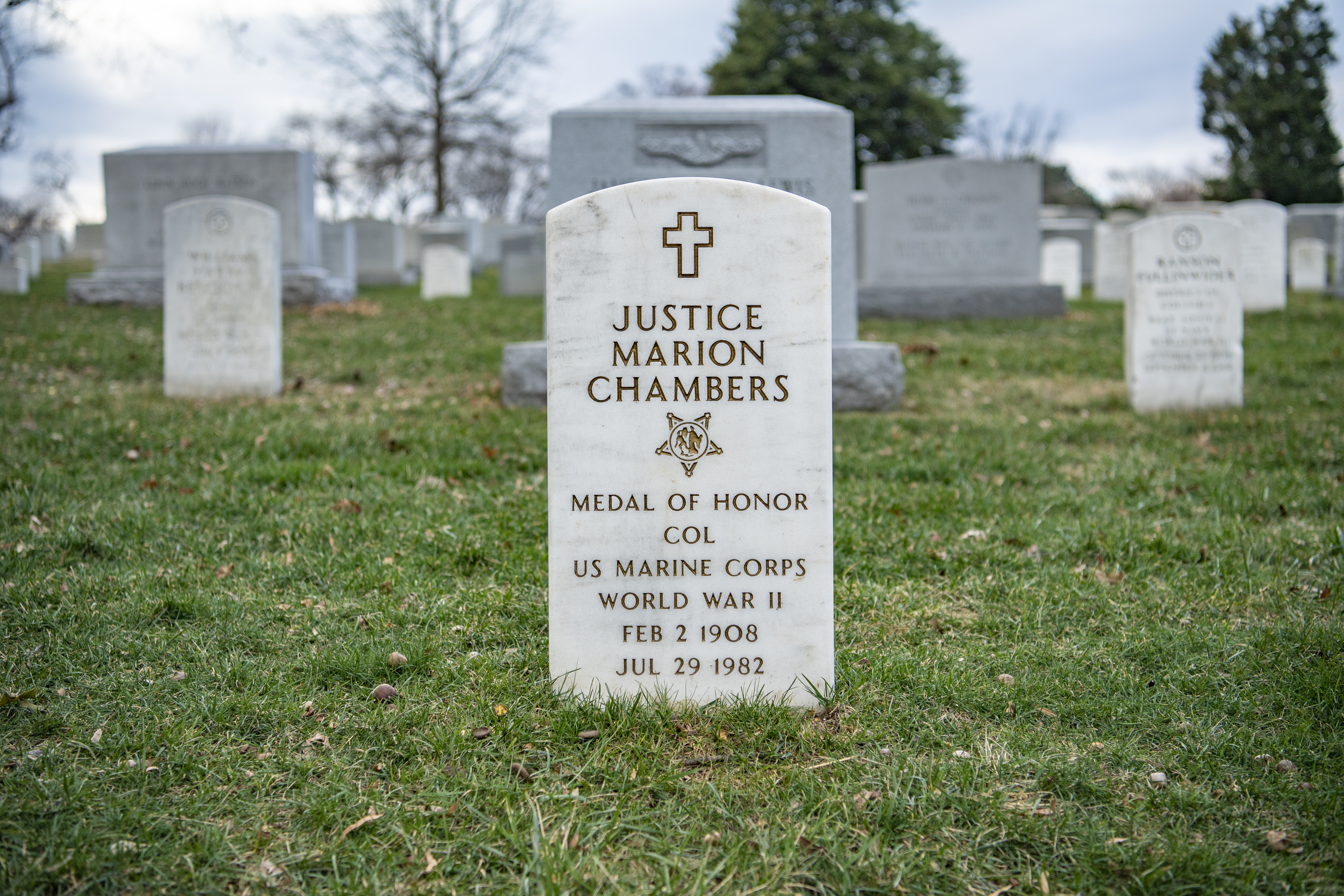
Grave at Arlington National Cemetery

He died on July 29, 1982, and was buried in Arlington National Cemetery.

== Awards and decorations ==

	Medal of Honor	
Silver Star	Legion of Merit with Valor device	Purple Heart with two award stars
Navy Presidential Unit Citation with three service stars	Organized Marine Corps Reserve Medal with two service stars	American Defense Service Medal
American Campaign Medal	Asiatic-Pacific Campaign Medal with silver service star	World War II Victory Medal

=== Medal of Honor citation ===
The President of the United States in the name of The Congress takes pride in presenting the MEDAL OF HONOR to

COLONEL
Justice Marion Chambers
UNITED STATES MARINE CORPS

For service as set forth in the following CITATION:

For conspicuous gallantry and intrepidity at the risk of his life above and beyond the call of duty as commanding officer of the 3d Assault Battalion Landing Team, 25th Marines, 4th Marine Division, in action against enemy Japanese forces on Iwo Jima, Volcano Islands, from 19 to 22 February 1945. Under a furious barrage of enemy machinegun and small-arms fire from the commanding cliffs on the right, Col. Chambers (then Lt. Col.) landed immediately after the initial assault waves of his battalion on D-day to find the momentum of the assault threatened by heavy casualties from withering Japanese artillery, mortar rocket, machinegun, and rifle fire. Exposed to relentless hostile fire, he coolly reorganized his battle-weary men, inspiring them to heroic efforts by his own valor and leading them in an attack on the critical, impregnable high ground from which the enemy was pouring an increasing volume of fire directly onto troops ashore as well as amphibious craft in succeeding waves. Constantly in the front lines encouraging his men to push forward against the enemy's savage resistance, Col. Chambers led the 8-hour battle to carry the flanking ridge top and reduce the enemy's fields of aimed fire, thus protecting the vital foothold gained. In constant defiance of hostile fire while reconnoitering the entire regimental combat team zone of action, he maintained contact with adjacent units and forwarded vital information to the regimental commander. His zealous fighting spirit undiminished despite terrific casualties and the loss of most of his key officers, he again reorganized his troops for renewed attack against the enemy's main line of resistance and was directing the fire of the rocket platoon when he fell, critically wounded. Evacuated under heavy Japanese fire, Col. Chambers, by forceful leadership, courage, and fortitude in the face of staggering odds, was directly instrumental in insuring the success of subsequent operations of the 5th Amphibious Corps on Iwo Jima, thereby sustaining and enhancing the finest traditions of the U.S. Naval Service.

=== Silver Star citation ===
Citation:

The President of the United States of America takes pleasure in presenting the Silver Star to Major Justice Marion Chambers (MCSN: 0-4796), United States Marine Corps Reserve, for conspicuous gallantry and intrepidity in action while attached to the First Marine Raider Battalion during the seizure of Tulagi, Solomon Islands, from enemy Japanese forces, on the night of August 7–8, 1942. While a patient at the Battalion Aid Station, suffering from multiple wounds inflected by a mortar shell, Major Chambers personally assumed control of the evacuation of the wounded when a hostile counterattack threatened to penetrate to the station. With utter disregard for his own personal safety, he also directed the action of the Marine detachment covering the removal of the wounded to a less dangerous area. His heroic devotion to duty was in keeping with the highest traditions of the United States Naval Service.

== Named After Justice M. Chambers ==
Marine Corps League – Col. Justice M. Chambers Detachment – #555 – 8720 Twinbrook Dr. Mentor, Ohio 44060

"Colonel Justice M. Chambers Memorial Bridge" West Virginia: U.S. Route 60 bridge crossing Four Pole Creek from Cabell County to Wayne County.

CHAMBERS AWARD FOR OUTSTANDING LEADERSHIP:
The Colonel Justice Marion "Jumping Joe" Chambers Award is presented annually to the Reserve company grade officer within the 4th Marine Division or 4th Force Service Support Group who best demonstrates the outstanding leadership qualities exemplified by Colonel Chambers during World War II. (MARINE CORPS ORDER 1650R.35B)

The Reserve Center in Brook Park, OH, home to HQ Co, 3d BN, 25th MAR is named after Col. Chambers.

== See also ==
- List of Medal of Honor recipients for World War II
- List of Medal of Honor recipients for the Battle of Iwo Jima
