= 3rd Battalion, 25th Marines =

Reserve infantry battalion

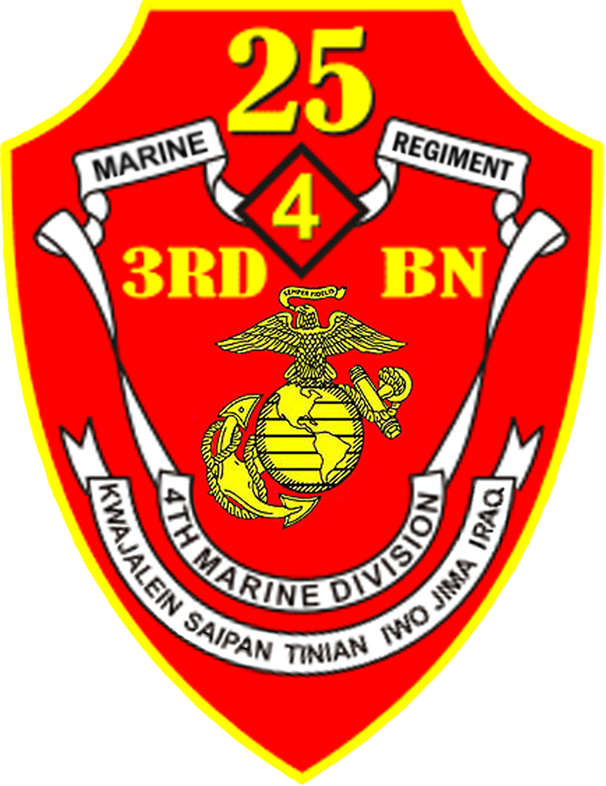
- 3/25 Insignia
- Active: May 1, 1943 – 1945; July 1, 1962 – present
- Country: United States of America
- Branch: United States Marine Corps
- Type: Infantry battalion
- Role: Locate, close with and destroy the enemy with fire and maneuver
- Size: ~ 800 personnel
- Part of: 25th Marine Regiment; 4th Marine Division
- Garrison/HQ: Brook Park, Ohio
- Nicknames: "Three deuce five" "Cold Steel Warriors"
- Motto: Find A Way or Make One
- Engagements: World War II: Battle of Kwajalein; Battle of Saipan; Battle of Tinian; Battle of Iwo Jima; War on terror: Operation Iraqi Freedom; Operation Enduring Freedom

Commanders
- Current commander: Lt Col. Michael Thatcher
- Notable commanders: Justice M. Chambers

3rd Battalion, 25th Marines (3/25) is a reserve infantry battalion in the United States Marine Corps. The battalion was first formed in 1943 for service in the Pacific Theater of Operations during World War II, taking part in a number of significant battles including those at Saipan and Iwo Jima before being deactivated at the end of the war. In the early 1960s, the unit was reactivated as a reserve battalion. Currently headquartered in Brook Park, Ohio with units throughout Ohio, Tennessee, and Pennsylvania, the battalion is nicknamed "three deuce five" and consists of approximately 800 Marines and Sailors. They fall under the 25th Marine Regiment and the 4th Marine Division. Recent operations have included tours in Iraq and Afghanistan.

== Current units ==
Name	Location
Headquarters and Services Company	Brook Park, OH
India Company	Johnson City, TN
Kilo Company	Perrysburg, OH
Lima Company	Columbus, OH
Weapons Company	Akron, OH

== Mission ==
To locate, close with, and destroy the enemy by fire and maneuver or to repel the enemy assault by fire and close combat. Additionally, the Battalion is prepared to augment active Marine Forces in case of national emergency.

== History ==
=== World War II ===
The 25th Marine Regiment was activated on May 1, 1943. The 25th Marine Regiment fought in the Battles of Saipan, Tinian, Kwajalein Atoll, and Iwo Jima. During the fighting on Iwo Jima, the battalion was tasked with the securing of Airfield One, before pushing northward into the heart of the Japanese defenses. Colonel Justice M. Chambers received the Medal of Honor for his actions as 3/25's commanding officer during the battle. His citation reads, in part, that while "exposed to relentless fire, he coolly reorganized his battle-weary men, inspiring them to heroic efforts by his own valor and in leading an attack on the critical, impregnable high ground." His medals are displayed in the trophy case located at H&S Brook Park, Ohio.

In 1945 the regiment was deactivated when World War II had ended.

=== Reactivation: 1960s–1990s ===
On July 1, 1962, the 25th Marine Regiment was reactivated as a Marine Corps Reserve Unit. This Regiment has continued to train in "every clime and place" for its role in the defense of the United States.

The 3rd Battalion, 25th Marines was again activated during Operation Desert Storm to support operations conducted in Southwest Asia. Although the Marines of 3/25 did not deploy to Southwest Asia, they played a key role in other operations in Norway, Panama, and Honduras.

=== Global war on terror ===
The battalion was activated on January 4, 2005. From January 10 to late February 2005, the companies conducted pre-deployment training at Marine Corps Air Ground Combat Center Twentynine Palms, California and March Air Reserve Base, California. The battalion was in Iraq by the first week of March 2005, tasked with training the Iraqi Security Forces (ISF) and conducting stability and security operations to prevent insurgents from gaining a foothold in and around the cities of Iraq's Al Anbar province.

Major operations that the battalion participated in during its deployment included Operations Matador, New Market, Spear, Sword, River Bridge, Outer Banks, and Quick Strike. The battalion rotated out of Iraq in late September 2005, and deactivated on January 3, 2006. Forty-six Marines and two Navy Corpsmen serving with the battalion in Iraq were killed in action. Lima Company received the most combat losses of any infantry unit since the Vietnam War with the exception of 1st Bn, 8th Marines who lost 220 during the Beirut Barracks attack in 1983. A memorial paying tribute to them was erected at the Battalion headquarters in Brook Park, Ohio and was dedicated on November 12, 2005.

On January 23, 2010, 3/25 Marines received notification from the CO of Activation/Mobilization. As per the message dated 221705z Jan 10, the unit would be officially activated May 1st, 2010 and begin pre-deployment procedures.

In August 2010, 3/25 deployed to Afghanistan in support of Operation Enduring Freedom to include The Areo Hunter Mission. The battalion's missions were across Helmand province and included reconnaissance, civil affairs, security and combat operations. The battalion rotated out of Afghanistan in March 2011, and was deactivated in June 2011. One Marine serving in the battalion was killed in action during the deployment. Lance Corporal Aaron M. Swanson, 21, died Monday February 7th, 2011 in Garmsir District, Helmand Province, Afghanistan.

== See also ==
- List of United States Marine Corps battalions
- Organization of the United States Marine Corps
