= Federation of Oil Unions in Iraq =

Founded in October 2005 from unions that had begun organizing after the invasion, the Federation of Oil Unions of Iraq is the largest independent union consortium in Iraq, with tens of thousands of members. It fully opposed the American occupation of Iraq.

== History ==
First organized in the Southern Oil Company Union in May 2003, Iraq's oil workers began organizing what became the General Union of Oil Employees (GUOE). They have pushed to keep Iraq's resources in the hands of Iraqis, while the union remained independent of any political parties and influences from the foreign occupation. It has not affiliated to either of the two major union federations of Iraq: the Iraqi Communist Party-connected Iraqi Federation of Trade Unions or the Worker-Communist Party of Iraq-influenced Federation of Workers Councils and Unions in Iraq, but it has worked with both groupings.

As SOCU, the oil workers engaged in direct action to expel Baathist managers from oil facilities, occupation forces began moving in to attempt to take over administration of the industry. Kellogg Brown and Root (KBR) led this, and was also militantly removed by the SOCU workers, along with subcontracted laborers. With threats to strike, the union was able to gain wage increases over what the United States-led occupation was willing to pay. KBR eventually took over much of the administration of the oil industry, although resistance in the form of strikes in June and August of that year, and blockades, continued. In cases where occupation forces threatened force, the SOCU workers warned that they would be met with armed resistance.

In June 2004, the GUOE was formed from the workers of the major oil companies: Southern Oil Company, Southern Gas Company, Southern Refinery Company, Iraqi Drilling Company, the Oil Carrier Company, the Gas Packing Company, the Oil Production Company, the Oil Projects Company, and the Oil Pipe Lines Company. In May 2005, the GUOE organized a large conference against privatization with hundreds of unionists and representatives of other international groups. More strikes came in July and August, usually with outcomes favorable to the workers. In October, union president Hassan Jumaa Awad led the group to change its name to the Federation of Oil Unions of Iraq.
