= Iraqi Federation of Trade Unions =

Former federation of unions in Iraq

- ألاتحاد العام لنقابات العمال فى العراق
- Merged into: 2005
- Founded: 2003
- Headquarters: Baghdad, Iraq
- Location: Iraq
- Members: 200,000 (2005)
- Key people: Rasem Hussien Abdullah, president; Hadi Saleh, international secretary; Abdullah Muhsin, foreign representative (Britain)
- Affiliations: Iraqi Communist Party
- Website: Official Website (2006 archive)

The Iraqi Federation of Trade Unions (IFTU) was the largest union federation in Iraq in the first half of the 2000s and, under Decree No. 16 in January 2004, the only one recognized by the Iraqi government. This, along with the organization's alliance with Ayad Allawi's transitional government, many other labor organizations distrusted and criticized the IFTU. In 2005, IFTU claimed 12 national unions and over 200,000 members, though it merged with three other union federations to form the General Federation of Iraqi Workers (also known as the Iraqi Workers' Federation) in 2006.

== History ==
The IFTU was formed in May 2003 at a conference in Baghdad by 400 union activists who had recently resumed their lives in Iraq after a period of hiding or exile. This occurred after Saddam Hussein was overthrown as the president of Iraq. The organization has roots in the Saddam-era and Ba'ath Party-supported General Federation of Trade Unions and an earlier group also called the Iraqi Federation of Trade Unions. The historical IFTU was headed by al-Qadir al-Ayash and Aram Khashadur in the late 1950s, was associated with the Iraqi Communist Party, and was legally affiliated with the World Federation of Trade Unions.

They supported democratic elections, secularism, and accountable leaders and opposed privatization. By late 2005, IFTU represented supporters of former prime minister Ayad Allawi and some Arab nationalists, though was still largely aligned with the Iraqi Communist Party.

== American occupation of Iraq ==
The IFTU were very critical of American occupation in Iraq; despite this, they were often criticized by other federations for being too supportive of it. Their mixed messaging may have been due to the fact that transitional prime minister Ayad Allawi, who was selected for the role by American occupation officials, had a strong alliance with the IFTU and often showed them favor, including by making them the only governmentally-recognized labor federation in the country.

In 2005, US Labor Against the War (USLAW), a non-governmental, anti-war organization, invited representatives from the IFTU, the Federation of Workers Councils and Unions in Iraq, and the General Union of Oil Employees to speak with a number of Americans opposed to foreign occupation of Iraq. At the end of their tour, USLAW and the union groups made a collective statement in opposition of the privatization of Iraq's economy that came as a consequence of the occupation. However, the IFTU was quick to clarify that they did not approve of the occupation in any way, even with the understanding that without foreign intervention, there was no guarantee for the safety of the Iraqi people.

Perhaps due to its fluctuating disdain for the occupation, the IFTU felt that the United States had a vendetta against them. On December 6, 2003, US forces raided an IFTU-affiliated Transport and Communication Workers' headquarters and arrested eight of its leaders. They detained for one day and released without charge, though the office remained closed until July 2004.

== Murders, kidnappings, and other attacks ==
IFTU's open support of the January 2005 Iraqi parliamentary election, which would elect a new National Assembly of Iraq to write an updated constitution, made the organization a target for attacks, kidnappings, and murders, mostly from insurgents who supported Saddam Hussein.

On November 3, 2004, four railroad workers were killed and mutilated; on December 25, two train engineers were kidnapped and five additional workers were beaten.

On January 4, terrorists believed to be part of the disbanded Mukhabarat broke into the house of IFTU international secretary Hadi Saleh and brutally tortured and murdered him.

On January 26, IFTU's Mosul president Saady Edan was kidnapped and tortured before being released six days later with the express warning to cease his work with the IFTU. On January 27, Talib Khadim Al Tayee, president of the IFTU-affiliated Mechanics', Metalworkers', and Printworkers' Union, was kidnapped during a meeting with union members. He was released five days later on February 1. On February 11, Moaid Hamed, who worked as the general secretary for IFTU's Mosul branch, was kidnapped as he left his home. He was released 14 days later.

On February 18, Ali Hassan Abd (also known as Abu Fahad) was gunned down while walking home with his children from the al-Daura oil refinery where he worked. He was a member of leadership in IFTU's oil union. On February 24, Ahmed Adrid Abbas was also shot and killed.

The violence against those affiliated with IFTU did not end after IFTU dissolved; in June 2006, IFTU co-founder Shukry Al Shakhly, was murdered.

== Merger ==
In September 2005, IFTU announced it was merging with the General Federation of Trade Unions and the General Federation of Iraqi Trade Unions to create a new organization called the General Federation of Iraqi Workers or the Iraqi Workers' Federation.
