= General Federation of Trade Unions (Iraq) =

- Merged into: 2005
- Founded: 1959
- Headquarters: Baghdad, Iraq
- Location: Iraq
- Key people: Jamil Jabbouri, president Karim Hamzeh, general secretary
- Affiliations: WFTU, ICATU

The General Federation of Trade Unions (GFTU) was a major federation of trade unions in Iraq prior to 2005, when it merged with the Iraqi Federation of Trade Unions and the General Federation of Iraqi Trade Unions to the General Federation of Iraqi Workers.

During the rule of Saddam Hussein, a 1986 legislation established that GFTU was the sole legal trade union in Iraq. GFTU worked in close cooperation with the Baath Party and worked to strengthen the influence of the party in the workplaces. At the time there were committees affiliated to GFTU at privately owned workplaces and workplaces with joint private-public ownership. GFTU did not operate in public enterprises or within the state administration. In January 2004, transitional prime minister Ayad Allawi's government passed a decree naming the Iraqi Federation of Trade Unions the only recognize union federation in Iraq.
