= Challenge Project =

Insurgency plan

The Challenge Project refers to an insurgency plan developed by Saddam Hussein and his advisers prior to the 2003 invasion of Iraq by the United States. It was orchestrated by a branch of the Iraqi Intelligence Service known as M14, the Directorate of Special Operations. According to an intelligence report by the United States Pentagon, as U.S.-led forces approached Baghdad, Iraqi intelligence officers dispersed to engage in guerrilla warfare, including bombings and other attacks.
