= Consolation payment =

Consolation payments is payment given to relatives of civilians who have died accidentally.

US Representative John Murtha has said that the United States has paid $5 million in consolation payments to the Iraqis in 2004 and $20 million in 2005.

== See also ==
- Iraq War
