= 2006 in Iraq =

- Decades: 1980s; 1990s; 2000s; 2010s; 2020s
- See also: Other events of 2006; List of years in Iraq

The following lists events that happened during 2006 in Iraq.

== Incumbents ==
- President: Jalal Talabani
- Prime Minister: Ibrahim al-Jaafari (until 20 May), Nouri al-Maliki (starting 20 May)
- Vice President: Ghazi Mashal Ajil al-Yawer (until 22 April), Tariq al-Hashimi (starting 22 April), Adil Abdul-Mahdi
- Iraqi Kurdistan Regional Government (autonomous region)
  - President: Massoud Barzani
  - Prime Minister: Nechervan Idris Barzani (until 1 March)

== Events ==
=== January ===
- January 4 – Suicide bomber struck a Shiite funeral in Karbala, killing 32 and wounding 40.
- January 5 – Iraq War
  - 50 people were killed and 80 wounded by a suicide bomb attack in the Iraqi city of Karbala.
  - 70 people were killed and 40 injured in a suicide attack on a line of police recruits in Ramadi.
  - Insurgent violence shut down Iraq's largest oil refinery.
- January 6 – Iraq War
  - Thousands of Shiites demonstrated in Baghdad after two days of bloodshed that claimed almost 200 lives.
  - A secret Pentagon study has found that at least 80 percent of the marines who died in Iraq due to wounds to their upper body could have survived if they had worn extra body armor. The armor had been available since 2003.
  - Paul Bremer, who led the U.S. civilian occupation authority in Iraq after the 2003 invasion, admitted the United States did not anticipate the insurgency in the country, as reported on NBC.
  - Demonstrations protesting against unemployment in the Iraqi town of Nasiriyah turned violent, leaving two dead and two dozen injured.

=== February ===
- February 22 – The Al Askari Mosque bombing. Although no injuries occurred in the blast, the bombing was hugely offensive to Shi'ites. This resulted in violence over the following days which was widely described as a civil war. The Iraqi government stated that 379 people were killed in the subsequent attacks, although the Washington Post reported that over 1,300 people were killed.
- February 28 – A bomber blew himself up near a petrol station in one of the Iraqi capital's Shia areas just before curfew and hours after other blasts killed 35.

=== March ===
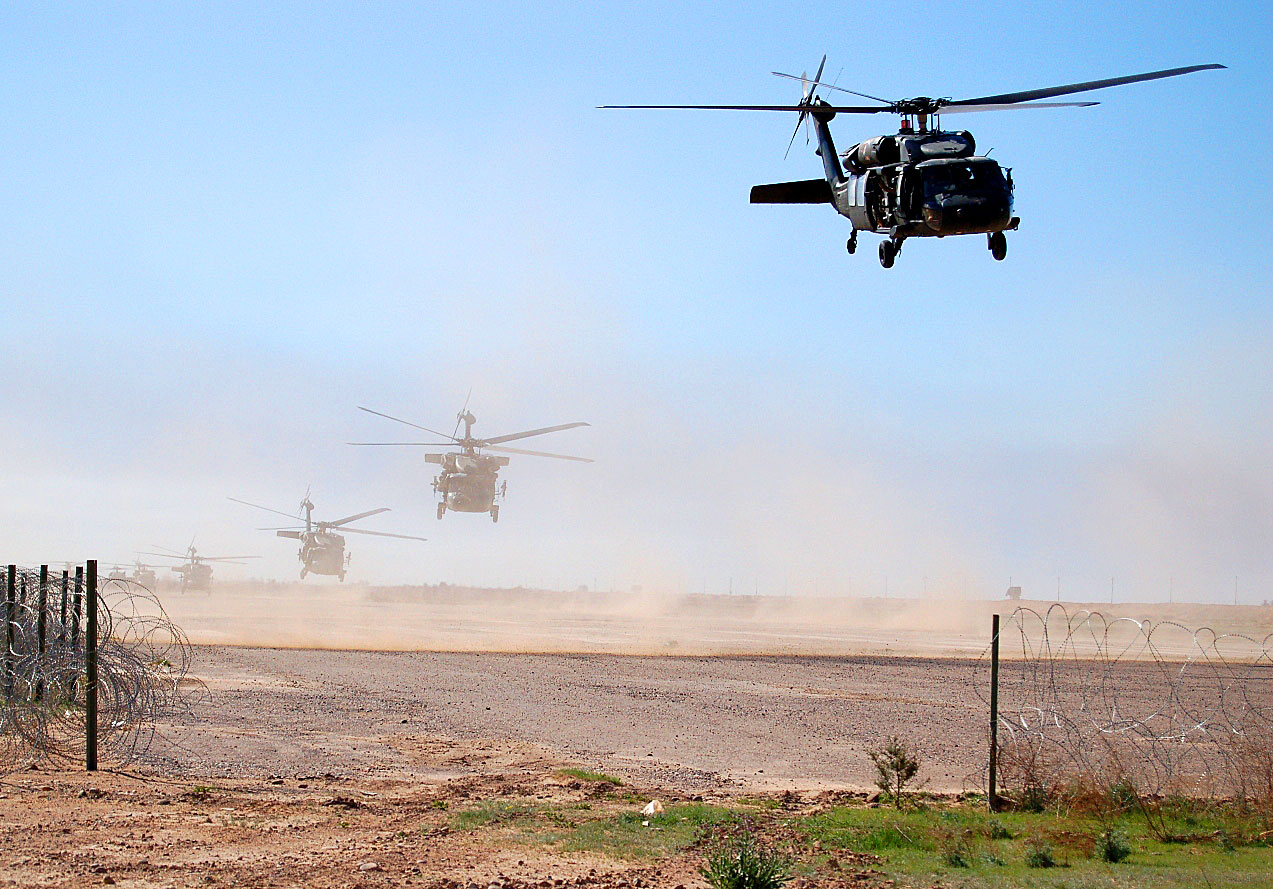
Operation Swarmer, March 2006

- March 12 – Abeer Qassim Hamza al-Janabi, a fourteen-year-old Iraqi girl was raped and murdered together with most of her family in the Mahmudiyah killings.
- March 23 – members of the Special Air Service recovered British and Canadian hostages ending the Christian Peacemaker hostage crisis.
- March 24 – The Joint Center for Operational Analysis at United States Department of Defense released a report compiled from captured Iraqi intelligence. The report stated that Russia aided Saddam's regime with correct information on the coalition invasion.
- March 25 (Saturday) – Iraq War
  - 40 people were killed or wounded in gun battle near Mahmudiyah.
  - US Ambassador Zalmay Khalilzad said that militias, many with strong ties to powerful Shiite leaders and well entrenched in security and police forces, are killing more Iraqis than terrorists.
- March 26 – 30 beheaded bodies found in Iraq.
- March 27 – Memo shows US president was firmly set on the path to war two months before the 2003 Iraq invasion.
  - 40 people were killed and 20 others wounded in a suicide bomb attack at a recruitment center.
- March 29 – Morgue officials said that around 30 to 40 bodies were being found on the streets of Baghdad every day.
- March 30 – Pentagon requests hundreds of millions of dollars in emergency funds for military construction in Iraq.

=== April ===
- April 16 – B Squadron, 22nd SAS Regiment carried out Operation Larchwood 4 in Yusufiyah.
- April 19 – British brigadier attacks America's 'Hollywood' generals.

=== May ===
- May 10 – Iraqi President Jalal Talabani made a public announcement urging all political parties to "quell this bleeding" after figures showed sectarian violence killed 1,091 in Baghdad the prior month.
- May 5 – Iraq was listed fourth on the 2006 Failed States Index compiled by the American Foreign Policy magazine and the Fund for Peace think-tank. The list was topped by Sudan.
- May 13/14 – As part of a series of operation in the "Triangle of Death" US forces took out an entire network in and around Latifiyah, the cell was led by Abu Mustafa who was responsible for shooting down a US Apache helicopter in early April. On May 13, US forces raided 4 houses used by Abu Mustafa network, quick exploitation of intelligence found in the raids resulted in US force hitting 3 more locations, the raids resulted in 15 "suspected al-Qaeda associates" as well as Abu Mustafa killed.

=== June ===
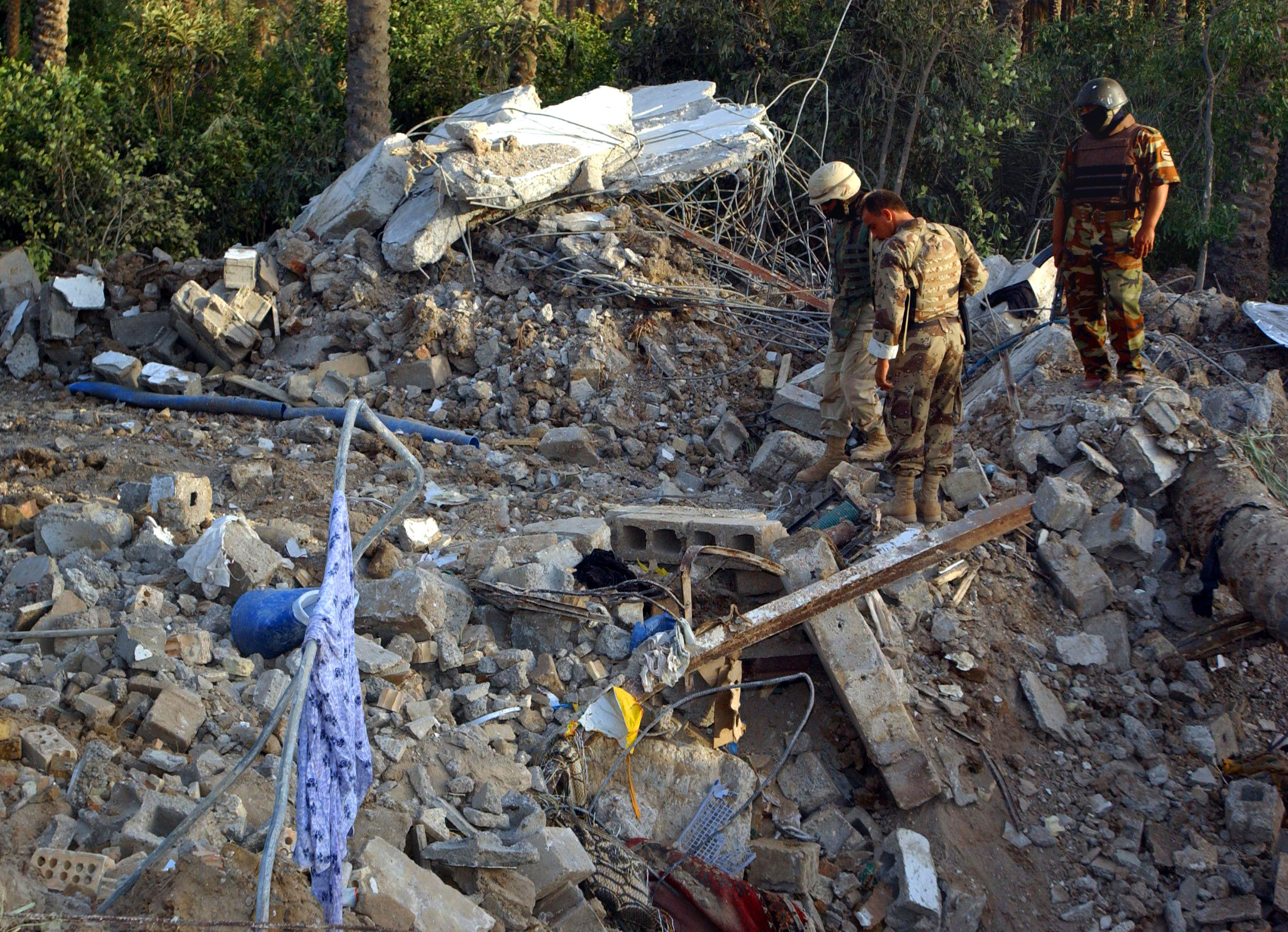
Remains of Zarqawi's safe house, June 8

- June 5 – A U.S. Navy SeaBee convoy moving between Al Quim and Al Asad was ambushed by several IEDs. Two members of NMCB-25 were killed. Petty Officer First Class Equipment Operator Gary Rovinski and Petty Officer Second Class Hospital Corpsman Jamie Jaenke.
- June 7 – Al-Qaeda in Iraq leader Abu Musab al-Zarqawi is killed by a U.S. air strike. Zarqawi was a Jordanian militant who had called for attacks against Shi'ites. Most Iraqis hoped his death will help ease sectarian bloodshed, much of which was masterminded by him.

=== July ===
Coalition and Iraqi soldiers conducting field operations in July 2006.

- July 1 – Attacks in the Shi'ite slum of Sadr City in Baghdad killed 66 people.
- July 9 – Shia gunmen allegedly massacred 40 Sunni Muslims in Baghdad after setting up fake security checkpoints a day after the Shi'ite Zahra mosque in the area was bombed.
- July 16 – An Iraqi general claims that a suicide bombing in a Shiite cafe in northern Iraq has killed 25 people.
- July 17 – British troops from the Brigade Reconnaissance Company of 20th Armoured Brigade, spearheaded by the SAS's HATHOR detachment captured Sajjad Badr Adal Sayeed, the leader of the Mahdi Army, in a raid on a building in Basra. Mahdi Army militia soon engaged the strike force cordon with assault rifles and RPGs, the engagement lasted for 2 hours resulting in 1 British soldier killed and at least 4 militiaman killed.
- July 18 – A car bomb killed 53 people in the holy Shi'ite city of Kufa.
- In July 2006, Baghdad's central morgue received 1,855 bodies, the most since the bombing of a Shia shrine in February prompted a wave of sectarian killings. The Iraqi government stated that 3,438 Iraqis died around the country that month.

=== August ===
- August – 70 Americans were killed in Iraq, 32 of them in Al Anbar province.

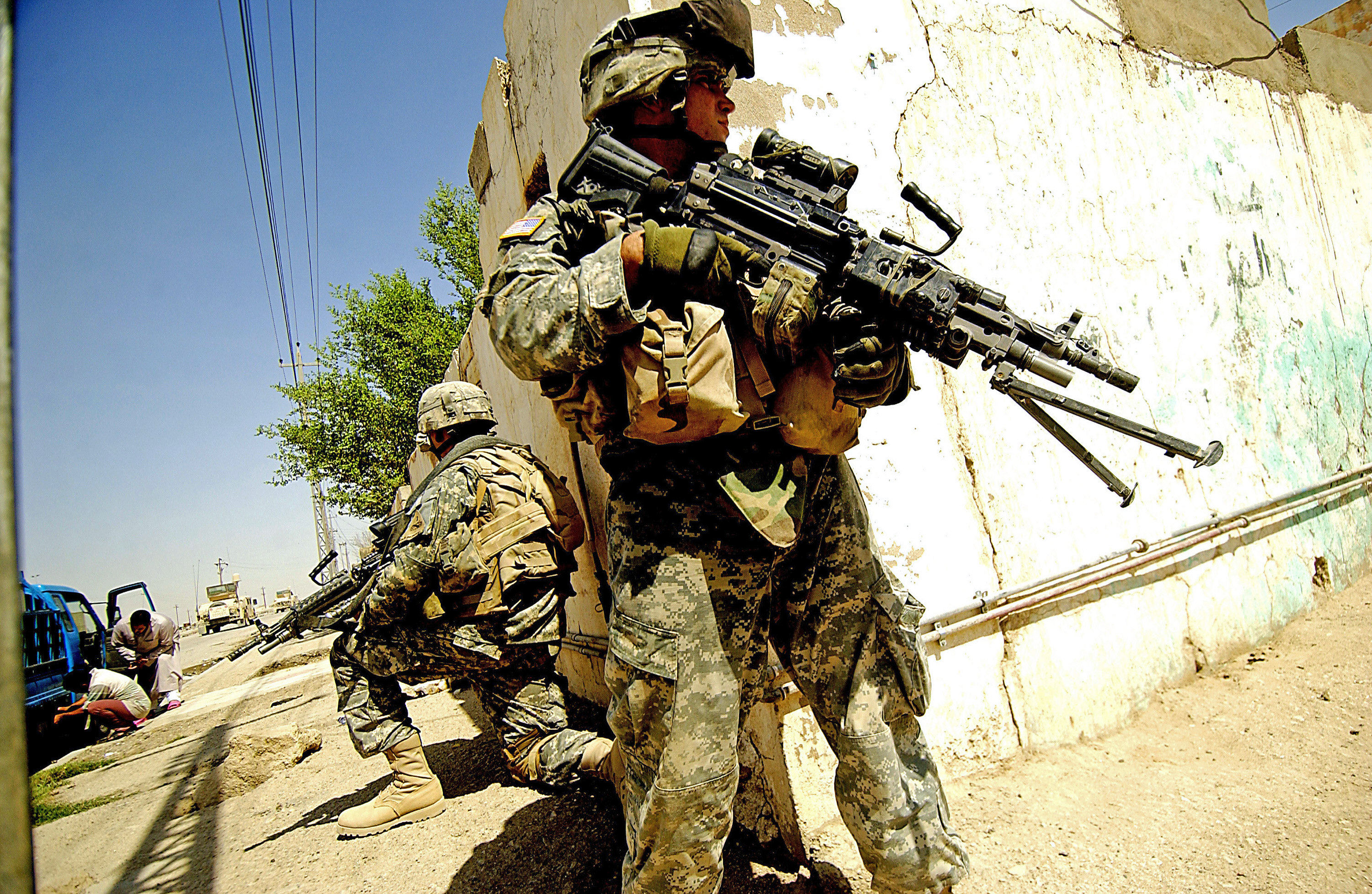
Battle of Ramadi: US soldiers take up positions on a street corner during a foot patrol in Ramadi, August 2006

- August 20 – Sunni snipers shot and killed at least 22 Shiites during a pilgrimage in Baghdad.

=== September ===
- September 11 – The Washington Post reported that the commander of the Marine forces in Iraq filed "an unusual secret report" concluding that the prospects for securing the Anbar province are dim, and that there is almost nothing the U.S. military can do to improve the political and social situation there.
- September 27 – A WPO poll found that seven out of ten Iraqis want U.S.-led forces to withdraw from Iraq within one year. The perception that the U.S. presence in Iraq has a negative impact on security is widespread and is given some support by the British withdrawal from Basra which led to a 90% reduction in violence. Overall, 78% of those polled said they believed that the presence of U.S. forces is "provoking more conflict than it's preventing." 53% of those polled believed the Iraqi government would be strengthened if U.S. forces left Iraq (versus 23% who believed it would be weakened), and 71% wanted this to happen in 1 year or less. All of these positions are more prevalent amongst Sunni and Shia respondents than among Kurds. 61% of respondents said that they "approve" of attacks on U.S.-led forces, while 94% still had an unfavorable opinion of al-Qaeda.

=== October ===
- October 20 – The U.S. military announced that Operation Together Forward had failed to stem the tide of violence in Baghdad, and Shiite militants under al-Sadr seized several southern Iraq cities.

=== November ===
- November 7 – The United States midterm elections removed the Republican Party from control of both chambers of the United States Congress. U.S. voters' perceptions of failings in the Iraq War were cited as one of the main causes of the Republicans' defeat, even though the Bush administration had attempted to distance itself from its earlier "stay the course" rhetoric.
- November 14 – Up to 150 people are abducted from the Ministry of Higher education and scientific research in Baghdad by armed men wearing security forces' uniforms. The kidnapped included academics, ministry staff and visitors.
- November 15 – Around 40 of the Ministry of Higher education kidnapping victims are released over night and another 30 were accounted for, leaving an estimated 40 missing.
- November 23 – The deadliest attack since the beginning of the Iraq war occurred. Suspected Sunni-Arab militants used five suicide car bombs and two mortar rounds on the capital's Shiite Sadr City slum to kill at least 215 people and wound 257. Shiite mortar teams quickly retaliated, firing 10 shells at Sunni Islam's most important shrine in Baghdad, badly damaging the Abu Hanifa mosque and killing one person. Eight more rounds slammed down near the offices of the Association of Muslim Scholars, the top Sunni Muslim organisation in Iraq, setting nearby houses on fire. Two other mortar barrages on Sunni neighborhoods in west Baghdad killed nine and wounded 21, police said.
- November 26 – EFP(explosively formed penetrator) attack near Sadr City kills 3 US Army soldiers and injures at least 2 others. Among those lost this day are PFC Joshua C Burrows, 20, 1st Cavalry Division, 1st Battalion, 8th Cavalry Regiment, based out of Ft. Hood, TX. Josh was a lifelong resident of Bossier City, LA.
- November 28 – Another Marine Corps intelligence report was released confirming the previous report on Anbar stating that, "U.S. and Iraqi troops 'are no longer capable of militarily defeating the insurgency in al-Anbar,' and 'nearly all government institutions from the village to provincial levels have disintegrated or have been thoroughly corrupted and infiltrated by Al Qaeda in Iraq.'"

=== December ===
- December 12 – Controversy arose when former Secretary of State Colin Powell announced before the surge took place that there would have to be a draw down of troops by mid-2007.
- December 30 – The former president Saddam Hussein, was executed by hanging.

== Notable deaths ==
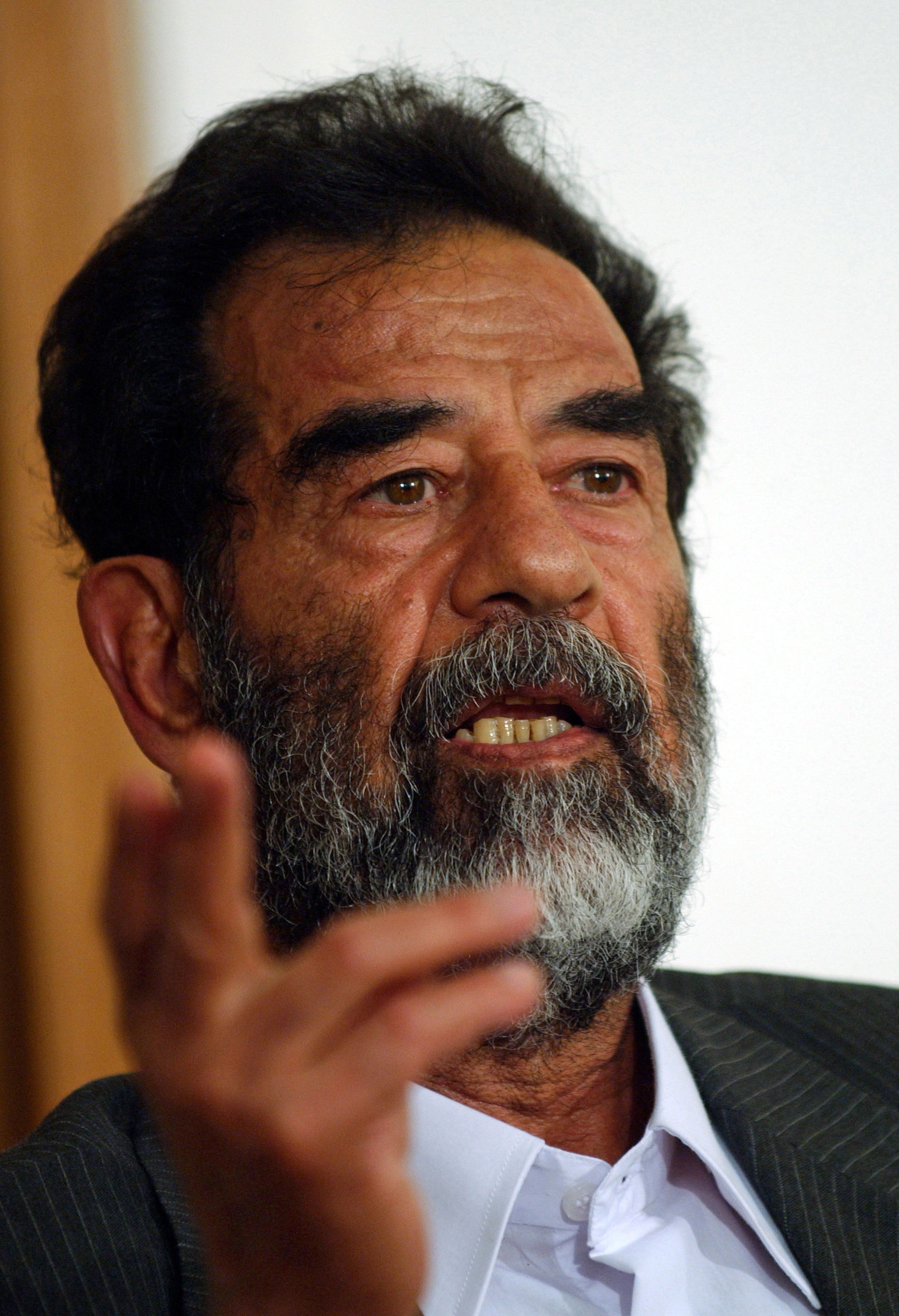
Saddam Hussein

- February 22 – Atwar Bahjat, 30, Iraqi journalist for al-Arabiya, abducted and killed in Iraq.
- March 6 – Mubdar Hatim al-Dulaimi, 55, Major General in the Iraqi Army, shot by a sniper.
- March 12 – Hadeel Qasim Hamza, 6, murder victim (born 1999)
- April 21 – Jacob Kovco, 25, first Australian Defence Force serviceperson killed in Iraq.
- May 6 – Wing Commander John Coxen, 46, Royal Air Force, most senior British Officer killed in Iraq to date.
- May 6 – Flt Lt Sarah Mulvihill, 32, first British servicewoman to be killed in action in Iraq.
- May 29 – James Brolan, 42, CBS News sound technician, injuries sustained in car bombing in Iraq.
- May 31 – Ali Jaafar Ali, 39, Iraqi sports anchorman, shot dead by unknown gunmen in Baghdad.
- June 7 – Abu Musab al-Zarqawi, 39, leader of Al-Qaeda in Iraq, US military strike.
- June 7 – Sheik Abd-Al-Rahman, spiritual adviser for Al-Qaeda in Iraq, US military strike.
- October 11 – Raad Mutar Saleh, Iraqi Mandaean leader, shot.
- November 20 – Walid Hassan, 47, Iraqi television comedian, shot.
- December 30 – Saddam Hussein, 69, Iraqi President (1979–2003), execution by hanging.

== See also ==
- Iraq War
