= 2003 in Iraq =

- Decades: 1980s; 1990s; 2000s; 2010s; 2020s
- See also: Other events of 2003; List of years in Iraq

The following lists events in the year 2003 in Iraq.

== Incumbents ==
- President – Saddam Hussein (until 9 April)
- Prime Minister – Saddam Hussein (until 9 April)
- Vice President – Taha Muhie-eldin Marouf (until May)
- Vice President – Taha Yassin Ramadan (until May)

Transitional government:

- Head of State –
  - Government Administrator – Jay Montgomery Garner (9 April–6 May) Paul Bremer
- Head of Government –
  1. Mohammad Bahr al-Ulloum, President of the Governing Council of Iraq (13 July – 31 July)
  2. Ibrahim al-Jaafari, President of the Governing Council of Iraq (1 August – 31 August)
  3. Ahmed Chalabi, President of the Governing Council of Iraq (1 September – 30 September)
  4. Ayad Allawi, President of the Governing Council of Iraq (1 October – 31 October)
  5. Jalal Talabani, President of the Governing Council of Iraq (1 November – 30 November)
  6. Abdul Aziz al-Hakim, President of the Governing Council of Iraq (1 December – 31 December)

== Events ==
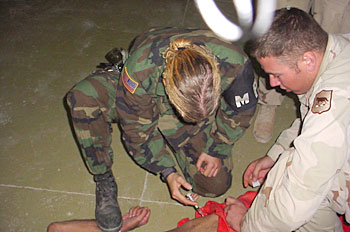
US Military Police officer restraining and sedating prisoner, while a soldier holds him down. Abu Gharib prison.

- The Abu Gharib prison torture scandal took place in 2003 and 2004.

=== January ===
- January 3 – United Nations arms inspectors from UNMOVIC have established a base of operations in Mosul, 375 kilometers or 200 miles north of Baghdad, to speed the inspection process.
- January 7 – French President Jacques Chirac, in a New Year's message to French forces, stated that French forces should be prepare to be activated if the United Nations decides on military action in Iraq.
- January 9 – UN Chief Weapons Inspector Hans Blix and International Atomic Energy Agency head Mohammed El Baradei give a report to the United Nations Security Council. They say that progress on the search for weapons of mass destruction in Iraq is "inching forward" but that a more "pro-active" stance is required from the Iraqi government.
- January 16 – UN weapons inspectors in Iraq stated that they found empty rocket warheads, designed to carry chemical warfare agents, at the Ukhaider Ammunition Storage Area.
- January 18 – A mass mobilization pulls together global protests against the Iraq war in cities around the world, including Tokyo, Moscow, Paris, London, Montreal, Ottawa, Toronto, Cologne, Bonn, Gothenburg, Istanbul, and Cairo. NION and ANSWER hold protests in Washington, D.C., and San Francisco, California.
- January 20 – As part of the plan to invade Iraq, British defence secretary Geoff Hoon announces that 26,000 British troops and equipment including 120 tanks will be sent to Kuwait, joining the 5,000 troops already on their way there.
- January 23 – 350 Australian troops begin their journey towards Iraq, joining the US and UK troops already assembled there. Prime Minister John Howard said that "pre-positioning troops increased the likelihood of (the crisis) being resolved peacefully". Around 150 people protested as the troop ship left Sydney, some shouting "Go yourself!" to Mr. Howard.
- January 27 – Speaking to the United Nations Security Council, Iraqi Foreign Minister Naji Sabri said that the United States and its allies are "unjustifably aggressive" and that Iraq is complying fully with requests made by the UN weapons inspectors. Speaking to the same forum, Hans Blix, the chief inspector, later said that Iraq had not been fully co-operative with the United Nations inspection teams.
- January 30 – Facing worldwide criticism and against the wishes of the majorities of their own electorates, leaders of Britain, Spain, Italy, Portugal, Hungary, Poland, Denmark, and the Czech Republic release a statement, the letter of the eight, demonstrating support for the United States' plans for an invasion of Iraq.

=== February ===
- February 5 – At the United Nations US Secretary of State Colin Powell presents the US government's case against the Saddam Hussein government of Iraq, as part of the diplomatic side of the U.S. plan to invade Iraq. The presentation includes tape recordings, satellite photographs and other intelligence data, and aims to prove WMD production, evasion of weapons inspections and a link to Al-Qaeda.
- February 7 - The chief United Nations arms inspector Hans Blix said Iraq appeared to be making fresh efforts to cooperate with U.N. teams hunting weapons of mass destruction, as Washington said the "momentum is building" for war with Iraq.
- February 8 – Sections of a 'dodgy dossier' issued by the UK government, which purported to present the latest British intelligence about Iraq, and which had been cited by Tony Blair and Colin Powell as evidence for the need for war, were criticized as plagiarisms. They had been copied without permission from a number of sources including Jane's Intelligence Review and a 12-year-old doctoral thesis of a Californian student that had been published in the US journal Middle East Review of International Affairs. Some sentences were copied word-for-word, and spelling mistakes had been reproduced from the original articles. Downing Street responded by saying that the government had never claimed exclusive authorship and that the information was accurate.
- February 9 – 13% of the 3,300 reservists called by the British Government in preparation for a possible war in Iraq have attempted to avoid being drafted.
- February 10 – France and Belgium broke the NATO procedure of silent approval concerning the timing of protective measures for Turkey in case of a possible war with Iraq. Germany said it supports this veto. The procedure was put into operation on February 6 by secretary general George Robertson. In response Turkey called upon Article 4 of the NATO Treaty, which stipulates that member states must deliberate when asked to do so by another member state if it feels threatened.
- February 12 – An audio tape attributed to Osama bin Laden is released by al Jazeera television. It recounts the battle of Tora Bora and urges Muslims to fight the United States and to overthrow the Iraq regime of Saddam Hussein.
- February 13 – Pre-Iraq invasion
  - Austria bars US military units involved in the attack on Iraq from entering into or flying over its territories without a United Nations mandate to attack Iraq.
  - United States military officials anonymously confirm to the Washington Post that two Special Forces units have been operating on the ground inside Iraq for over a month, making preliminary preparations for a large-scale invasion.
  - A United Nations panel reports that Iraq's al-Samoud 2 missiles have a range of 180 km (above the 150 km limit allowed by the UN), splitting opinion over whether they breach UNSCR 1441.
- February 14 – Pre-Iraq invasion
  - A very large demonstration was held in Melbourne to protest against the Australian government's support for the US's policy on Iraq. Organisers estimated that 200,000 people came out on to the streets, while some news sources put the number at "up to 150,000".
  - UNMOVIC chief weapons inspectors Hans Blix and Mohamed ElBaradei presented a report to the United Nations Security Council. They stated that the Iraqis had been co-operating well with the inspectors and that no weapons of mass destruction had been found, but that the Saddam Hussein regime had still to account for many banned weapons believed to have been in his arsenal. Blix also expressed doubts about some of the conclusions in Colin Powell's Security Council presentation of February 5, and specifically questioned the significance of some of the photographic evidence that Mr Powell had presented.
  - Tariq Aziz of Iraq met with Pope John Paul II.
- February 15 – More than six million people protest in over 600 cities worldwide, the largest war protest to take place before the war occurred.
- February 16 – A missile larger than allowed by UN sanction rules has been found in Iraq.
- February 24 – General Colin Powell states at a meeting in Beijing that "It is time to take action. The evidence is clear ... We are reaching that point where serious consequences must flow." His speech appears to imply that military action is likely to follow within three weeks, based on previous Pentagon briefings.
- February 25 – Pre-Iraq invasion
  - The United States, Britain and Spain present to the UN Security Council a much-anticipated second resolution stating that Iraq "has failed to take the final opportunity" to disarm, but does not include deadlines or an explicit threat of military force. Meanwhile, France, Germany, and Russia offer a counter-proposal calling for peaceful disarmament through further inspections. Sometime reporter Jeff Gannon, actual name James Guckert, signs in at the White House for the first time, according to Secret Service White House access logs obtained through FOIA by Representatives John Conyers (D-MI) and Louise Slaughter (D-NY).
  - Both major parties of Kurdistan, an autonomous region in Northern Iraq, vow to fight Turkish troops if they enter Kurdistan to capture Mosul or interfere in Kurdish self-rule. Between them the two parties can mobilize up to 80,000 guerillas – most likely no match for the modern Turkish army, but a severe blow to the unity of U.S. allies on the Northern front expected in the U.S. plan to invade Iraq.
- February 26 – Pre-Iraq invasion
  - United Nations chief weapons inspector Hans Blix said there is no evidence that Iraq has any weapons of mass destruction.
  - U.S. President George W. Bush talks publicly about his vision of a post-invasion democracy in Iraq. Bush says it will be "an example" to other nations in Arabia.
  - The House of Commons saw the largest rebellion by MPs from any governing party in Britain for at least 100 years. 122 MPs from the ruling Labour party were among 199 from all parties who voted to add the phrase "[This House] finds the case for military action against Iraq as yet unproven" to a government motion. The motion itself endorsed UN Security Council Resolution 1441 and supported "... the Government's continuing efforts in the UN to disarm Iraq of its weapons of mass destruction."
  - Saddam Hussein, in an interview with Dan Rather, rules out exile as an option. He calls for dialogue with United States president George W. Bush, and suggests that the two should engage in a televised debate.
- February 27 – Pre-Iraq invasion
  - Spanish Prime Minister José María Aznar personally asks United States President George W. Bush to silence Secretary of Defense Donald Rumsfeld, indicating that Rumsfeld's numerous public remarks on European countries' Iraq policies are generally viewed as inflammatory and overwhelmingly counterproductive within the European diplomatic community. Aznar indicated a preference for Secretary of State Colin Powell.
  - Regarding the disarmament of Iraq, the chief weapons inspector Hans Blix, says "The results in terms of disarmament have been very limited so far."
  - Elie Wiesel, Nobel Peace Prize winner and Holocaust survivor, announced his support to the United States and United Kingdom campaign against Iraq.
- February 28 – Pre-Iraq invasion
  - Iraq begins the process of destroying Al Samoud two missiles on March 1. Hans Blix, U.N. chief weapons inspector said "It is a very significant piece of real disarmament". However, the spokesman of the White House, Ari Fleischer declared that the Iraq commitment to destroy these missiles is a fraud that President George W. Bush had predicted, and indicated that the United States wanted a total and complete disarmament of Iraq. He also repeated that if the United Nations did not act to disarm Baghdad, the United States would lead a coalition of voluntary countries to disarm Saddam Hussein.
  - Canada's Prime Minister Jean Chrétien indicates that he believes that regime change is a dangerous goal for an invasion of Iraq, and that disarmament only should be the goal of international pressure.
  - It is reported that, citing "national interest" as a reason, the British government under Margaret Thatcher contributed approximately £1bn of taxpayer money to Iraq under Saddam Hussein in the 1980s. Most of this money went into military infrastructure built by British companies such as GEC-Marconi.

=== March ===
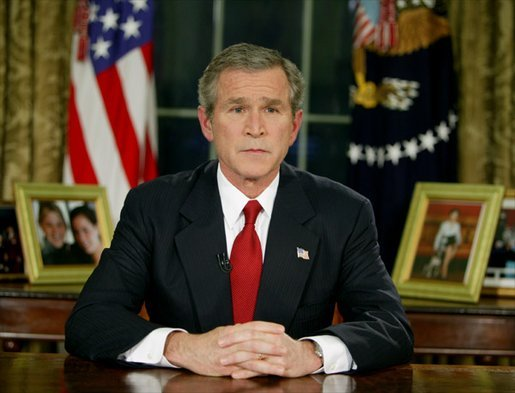
US President George W. Bush addresses the nation from the Oval Office, March 19, 2003, to announce the beginning of Operation Iraqi Freedom.

- March 1 – Pre-Iraq invasion
  - The United Arab Emirates calls for Iraqi president Saddam Hussein to step down to avoid war. The sentiment is later echoed by Bahrain and Kuwait.
  - The Turkish speaker of Parliament voids the vote accepting U.S. troops involved in the planned invasion of Iraq into Turkey on constitutional grounds. 264 votes for and 250 against accepting 62,000 US military personnel do not constitute the necessary majority under the Turkish constitution, due to 19 abstentions.
  - Under U.N. supervision, Iraq begins destroying four of its Al Samoud missiles.
- March 2 – Iraq destroys six more Al-Samoud 2 missiles, bringing the total destroyed to 10 out of an estimated 100 missiles ordered eliminated by the U.N. The U.S. continues to dismiss Iraq's actions as "part of its game of deception." Iraq indicates that it may halt destruction of the missiles if the U.S. indicates it will go to war anyway.
- March 3 – Under intense American pressure, Turkey indicates that its Parliament will consider a second vote on whether to allow U.S. troops to use Turkish bases for a military attack on Iraq.
- March 5 – Pre-Iraq invasion
  - The foreign ministers of France, Germany and Russia indicate that they will oppose any UN Security Council proposals that would authorize war with Iraq.
  - UK newspaper The Times reports that the United Nations had secretly drawn up a plan to establish a post-war government in Iraq. Although no consensus had been reached among UN Security Council members in regard to military action, the document indicated that UN leaders may now consider war all but inevitable.
  - Meeting of the Organisation of the Islamic Conference in Qatar fails to produce a statement opposing war in Iraq.
  - Saudi Arabia deploys 3,300 troops to Kuwait in preparation for a potential Iraq conflict.
  - Students protest and go on strike in a number of countries around the world.
  - Crossgates Mall in Guilderland, New York, dropped charges of trespassing against a man who had been arrested for refusing to remove his "Give Peace a Chance" T-shirt. The change of heart occurred after over 100 anti-war demonstrators marched through the mall and threatened to stay until the mall backed down.
- March 7 – Pre-Iraq invasion
  - Hans Blix reports to the UN Security Council citing Iraq's increased but qualified cooperation.
  - Revising the draft resolution put forth by the United States, United Kingdom and Spain a week ago, Britain proposes setting March 17 as the date for Iraq to voluntarily disarm or face the prospect of war.
  - The Nikkei benchmark hit a 20-year low record as war in Iraq appears closer, alleged stock manipulation by Nikko Salomon Smith Barney came to light, North Korea is preparing to test fire a mid-range missile, and a new political scandal in the party of Prime Minister Junichiro Koizumi came to light.
- March 8 – Pre-Iraq invasion
  - Kuwaiti workers have been instructed to make 35 holes in the fence between Iraq and Kuwait, and that the Kuwaiti army is positioning tanks at these openings. The Pakistan Daily Times reported that UNIKOM had found armed US Marines in the demilitarized zone along the fence last month. CBC reported that 230 UN support workers have been ordered out of the demilitarized zone.
  - The Japanese government expressed support for a revised draft resolution submitted jointly by the United States, United Kingdom and Spain to the United Nations Security Council that sets March 17 as the deadline for Iraq. Japanese media opinion polls taken last week indicate that 84% of Japanese people oppose an Iraq war.
- March 9 – Pre-Iraq invasion
  - In an interview on BBC Radio 4, Clare Short, a member of Tony Blair's cabinet, describes his stance on Iraq as "deeply reckless", and says she would resign if he committed the UK to war without an unambiguous mandate from the United Nations.
  - ArabNews reports that Saddam Hussein demanded that the UN Security Council lift the "embargo against Iraq", denounce the United States and the United Kingdom as "liars", strip Israel of weapons of mass destruction and force Israel to withdraw from "Palestine and occupied Arab land".
  - Albania says it will send troops to join any war against Iraq, largely a symbolic measure thanking the United States and NATO for intervening in Kosovo in the 1999 Kosovo War.
- March 10 – Pre-Iraq invasion
  - The White House press secretary, paraphrasing the President, stated "If the United Nations fails to act, that means the United Nations will not be the international body that disarms Saddam Hussein. Another international body will disarm Saddam Hussein."
  - Kofi Annan, Secretary General of the United Nations, stated "If the US and others were to go outside the [Security] Council and take military action it would not be in conformity with the [UN] Charter".
  - French president Jacques Chirac declares that France will veto a UN resolution sponsored by Spain, the United Kingdom, and the United States. The resolution would authorize use of force against Iraq unless that country proves it disarmament by March 17.
  - Russian Foreign Minister Igor Ivanov announced that Russia would veto a UN resolution by the US and the UK authorising the use of force against Iraq.
  - U.S. diplomat John Brown, who joined the State Department in 1981, resigned. He said that the Bush administration's Iraq policy was fomenting a massive rise in anti-US sentiment around the world and he could not support it.
- March 11 – Pre-Iraq invasion
  - Iraqi fighters threaten two U.S. U-2 surveillance planes, flying missions for U.N. weapons inspectors, forcing them to abort their mission and return to base. Iraqi officials described the incident as a "technical mistake" by the U.N. inspectors. Ewen Buchanan, spokesman for UNMOVIC, said that Iraqi officials had been notified about the flight beforehand
  - According to Arab media, Saddam Hussein opens terrorist training camps in Iraq for Arab volunteers willing to carry out suicide bombings against U.S. forces if a U.S.-led attack took place.
- March 12 – British prime minister Tony Blair proposes an amendment to the possible 18th U.N. resolution, which would call for Iraq to meet certain benchmarks to prove that it was disarming. The amendment is immediately rejected by France, who promises to veto any new resolution.
- March 14 – Pre-Iraq invasion
  - U.S. Representative James P. Moran, Democrat from Virginia, is forced out of a party leadership post after furor over his remarks that were interpreted as saying that American Jews are responsible for a possible war with Iraq.
  - Key documents presented as evidence that the US should invade Iraq are revealed as forgeries. The documents stated that Niger was selling 500 tons of uranium to Iraq. One, dated 2000, was on stationery from the military government of the 1980s and referred to a foreign minister who had not been in power for 14 years; another bore a signature of the president of Niger that was an obvious fake. Iraq's supposed acquisition of African uranium was a feature in Colin Powell's speech to the UN Security Council in February and in George W. Bush's State of the Union Address. Senator John Rockefeller asked the FBI to investigate the origin of the documents. Rockefeller expressed concern that the forgeries "may be part of a larger deception campaign aimed at manipulating public opinion and foreign policy regarding Iraq."
- March 15 – A round of protests against the Iraq War takes place in cities across the world.
- March 16 – Pre-Iraq invasion
  - The leaders of the United States, Britain, Portugal, and Spain meet at a summit in the Azores Islands. U.S. President Bush calls Monday, March 17, the "moment of Truth", meaning that the "coalition of the willing" would make its final effort to extract a resolution from the U.N. Security Council that would give Iraq an ultimatum to disarm immediately or to be disarmed by force.
  - Largest co-ordinated worldwide vigil as part of the global protests against war on Iraq.
- March 17 – Pre-Iraq invasion
  - President Bush gives the final ultimatum to Saddam Hussein. His conditions are that Saddam and his sons, Qusay and Uday, must leave Iraq in 48 hours.
  - Kofi Annan, Secretary General of the United Nations, orders all UN personnel to leave Iraq.
  - Peter Goldsmith, Attorney General of the UK set out the legal justification for an invasion of Iraq. Robin Cook, Leader of the British House of Commons, resigned from the UK cabinet over the plan to invade Iraq. The UK and the US have withdrawn a proposed UN Security Council resolution on Iraq. The United States advised UNMOVIC and the International Atomic Energy Agency to withdraw all weapon inspectors out of Iraq. Japanese prime minister Junichiro Koizumi said that he supports the U.S., U.K., and Spain for ending diplomatic efforts against Iraq. He also indicates no further UN resolution is necessary to invade Iraq.
- March 18 – Pre-Iraq invasion
  - U.S. Secretary of State Colin Powell says that thirty nations have joined with the United States in a "coalition of the willing" to remove Saddam Hussein from power, with another 15 quietly promising their support.
  - Naji Sabri, the Iraqi foreign minister, calls U.S. President George W. Bush "a war criminal", "tyrant", "despot" and "idiot". He also claims that evacuation of UNIKOM from the demilitarized zone violates the UN resolution of 1991.
  - Approximately US$1 billion is stolen from the Central Bank of Iraq, just hours after the United States began bombing Baghdad.
  - The United Kingdom Parliament votes in to grant Parliamentary Approval for the invasion of Iraq.
- March 19 – President Bush orders the invasion of Iraq. General Tommy Franks is supreme commander in the area. Bombs begin dropping on military targets in Baghdad. Jørn Siljeholm, a weapons inspector recently in Iraq, accuses the U.S. of lying about evidence for weapons of mass destruction.
- March 20 – The Invasion of Iraq begins with a series of bombings targeting Baghdad. Land troops from United States, United Kingdom, Australia, and Poland invade Iraq.
- March 21 – The United States and the United Kingdom begin their shock and awe campaign with a massive air strike on military targets in Baghdad using cruise missiles fired from US Navy warships, Royal Navy submarines and B-52 bombers; and laser guided missiles fired by Stealth Bombers.
- March 26 – 2003 invasion of Iraq
  - UN Secretary General Kofi Annan says that American and allied troops in Iraq must be used to provide humanitarian aid to Iraqis whilst the security situation is so unstable.
  - At least 14 people are killed in Baghdad after a missile hits a marketplace.
  - Al Jazeera television broadcasts images of two dead soldiers and two prisoners of war, whom it says are British.
  - 954 paratroopers of the US Army's 173rd Airborne made a combat jump into the Bashur Drop Zone as part of Operation Iraqi Freedom.
- March 28 – During the Coalition invasion of Iraq, two A-10 Thunderbolts from the USAF 190th Fighter Squadron fired on and destroyed two armored vehicles from the United Kingdom's D-Squadron, killing one British soldier, and injuring five others.

=== April ===
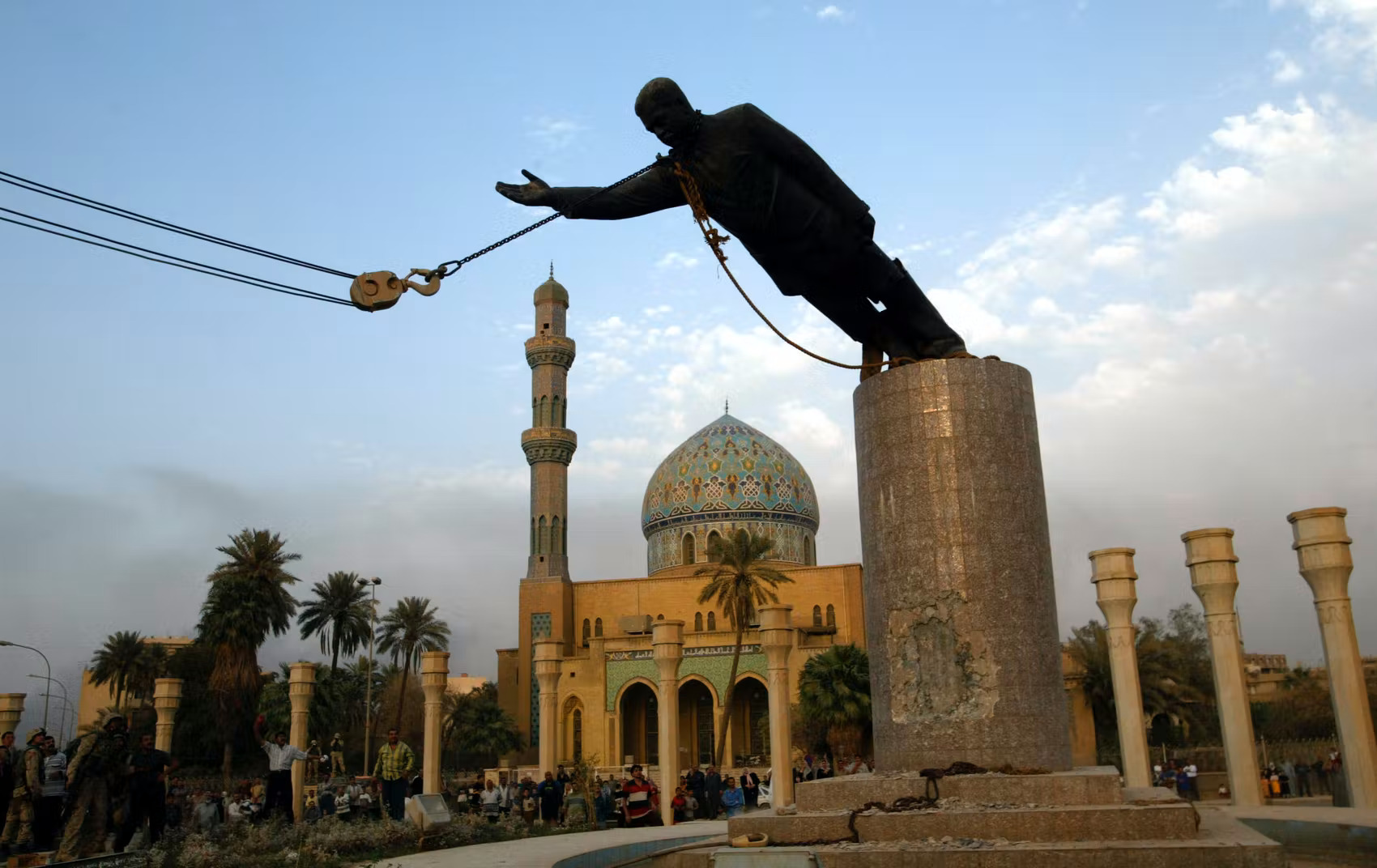
Statue of Saddam Hussein being toppled in Baghdad's Firdos Square on April 9, 2003.

- April 8 – three journalists in Baghdad were killed by a US tank
- April 9 – U.S. forces advance into Baghdad and overtake it with little resistance, Saddam Hussein and other Iraqi government officials go into hiding.
- April 10 – Kurdish forces capture Kirkuk.
- April 15 –
  - U.S. forces seize control of most of Tikrit.
  - U.S. forces capture Abu Abbas in Baghdad.
- April 21 – retired Lt Gen Jay Garner becomes the civil leader of Iraq when the Office for Reconstruction and Humanitarian Assistance (ORHA) is formed and he is placed as the administrator with three deputies, including Tim Cross.
- April 23 – U.S. forces arrive in Fallujah.
- April 28 – A group of 200 protestors defy the U.S. imposed curfew in Fallujah and organize a protest. During the protest soldiers occupying a schoolhouse claim to have been fired upon, and kill 15 in returning fire. No U.S. casualties were reported.

=== May ===
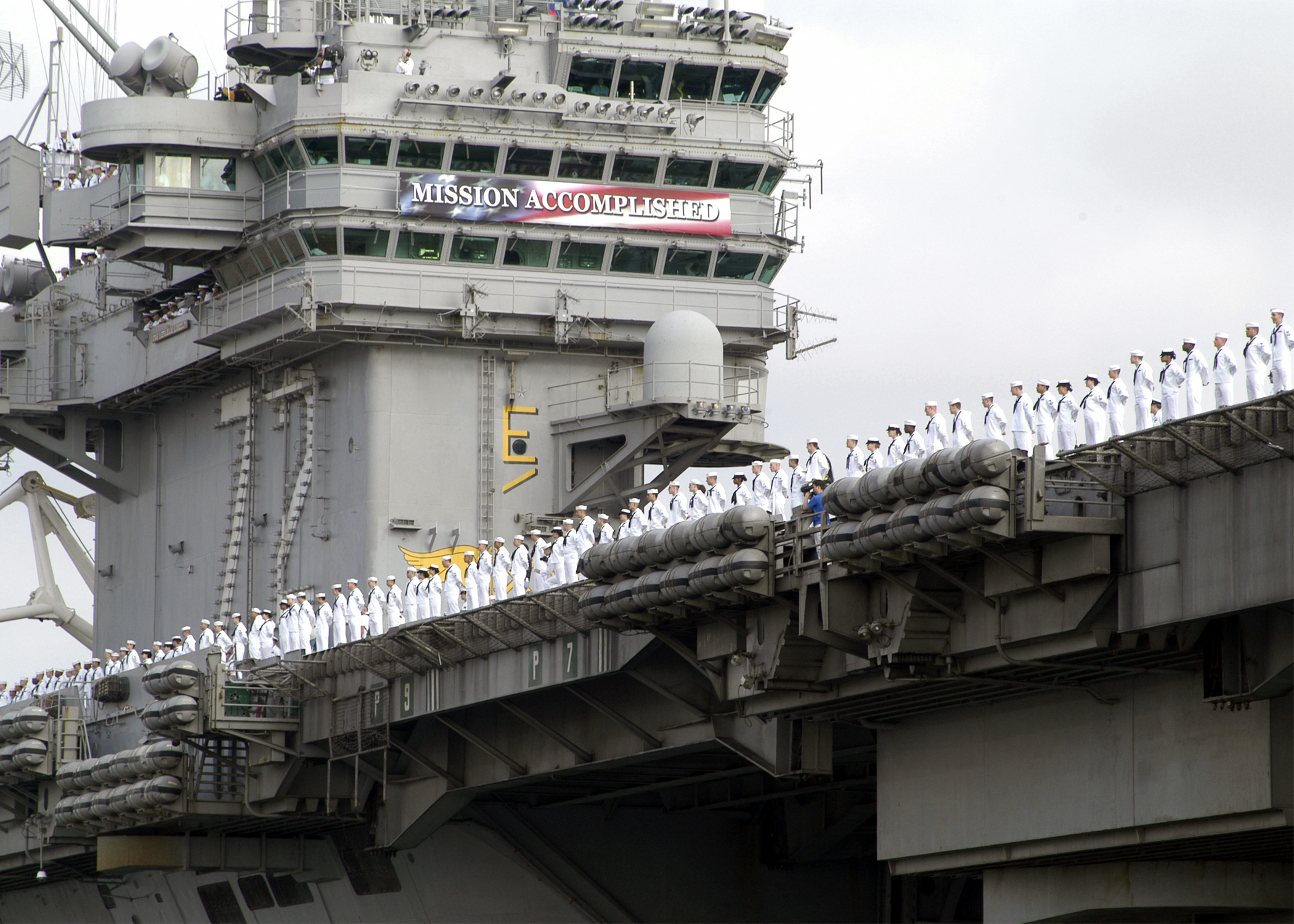
The USS Abraham Lincoln returning to port carrying its Mission Accomplished banner

- May 1 –
  - U.S. President Bush announces an end to major combat operations on a visit to the aircraft carrier USS Abraham Lincoln, which marked the end of the invasion, the United States military occupation had begun.
  - Secretary of Defense Donald Rumsfeld arrives in Baghdad and greets Jay Garner.
- May 12 – Paul Bremer arrives in Iraq as the head of the newly formed Coalition Provisional Authority (CPA) and replaces General Jay Garner as the civil leader of Iraq.
- May 15 – Operation Planet X captures 260 suspected fugitives near Tikrit. 230 are later released. Some high-level fugitives are captured from the raid.
- May 22 – Reports of high uranium concentration in Afghan urine in 2003 fueled speculation that the coalition used depleted uranium weapons in Afghanistan. However, further research in 2005 showed the isotope ratios to be more consistent with a natural (not depleted) uranium source.
- May 25 – The US-led Coalition Provisional Authority launches the controversial de-Baathification process to eliminate the Baath party's influence.

=== June ===
U.S. Marines in Iraq, June 2003

- June 24 – 6 British Royal Military Police soldiers are killed by a mob in Majar al-Kabir in Southern Iraq.

=== July ===
- July 2 – President Bush declared that U.S. troops would remain in Iraq in spite of the attacks.
- July 6 – Joseph C. Wilson IV, reveals in the New York Times' editorial page that the Iraqi's yellow cake excuse is "bunk".
- July 7 – General John Abizaid replaces General Tommy Franks as CENTCOM commander.
- July 22 – Paul Bremer appoints a special Iraq interim governing council from prominent Iraqis from different areas of Iraq.
- July 22 – Members of the 101st Airborne kill Uday and Qusay Hussein during a three-hour firefight in Mosul, Iraq.

=== August ===
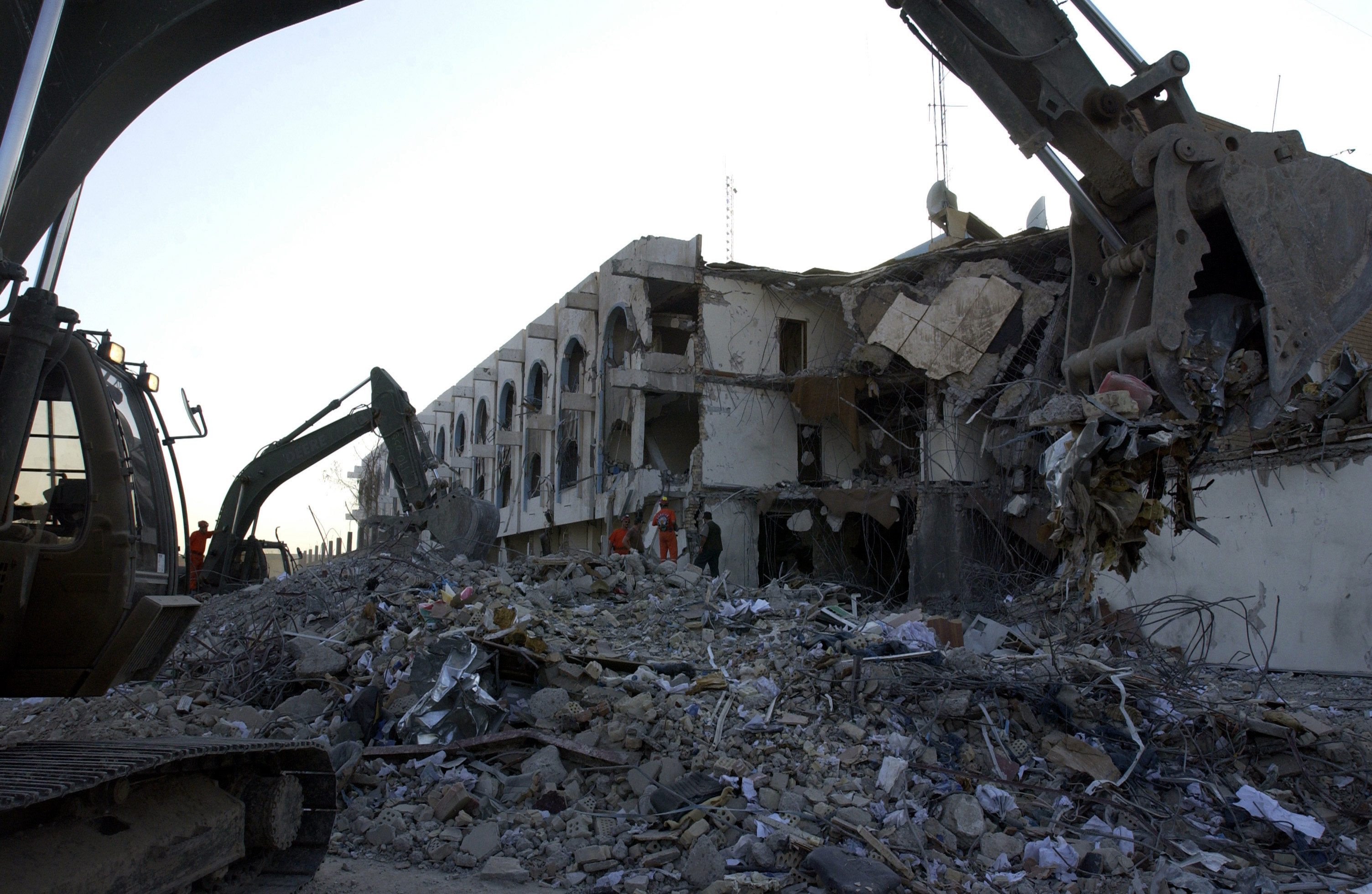
UN headquarters in Baghdad after the Zarqawi's men bombed it, August 22

- August 7 – Jordanian embassy bombing in Baghdad.
- August 19 – A truck bomb attack on the UN kills Sérgio Vieira de Mello and 21 others. This leads to the UN leaving Iraq due to security concerns.
- August 29 – The Shi'ite Imam Ali Mosque was hit by a suicide car bomber assassinating the head of one of Iraq's largest Shi'ite parties who had led prayers there and killing between 85 and 125 others.

=== September ===
- September 20 – Aquila al-Hashimi, a member of the Iraq Interim Governing Council is shot in the abdomen. She dies five days later.

=== October ===
As part of the CPA plan of "De-Ba'athification" Americans briefly paid many Iraqi soldiers who Saddam failed to compensate with wages around the time of the U.S. lead invasion. On October 5, 2003, those payments abruptly came to an end when cash ran out ahead of the announced timetable for such payouts. Many soldiers of the Iraq Army still had yet to receive their wages either from the Iraqi government or the Coalition. Now jobless and without an income a crowd of appx 20,000 people, largely former soldiers and Ba'ath party members gathered at the pay sites location on Damascus Street in Baghdad and began a demonstration that quickly developed into a full-scale riot. A notable uptick in "insurgency" attacks against coalition forces followed soon thereafter.

- October 27 – 2003 Baghdad bombings

=== November ===
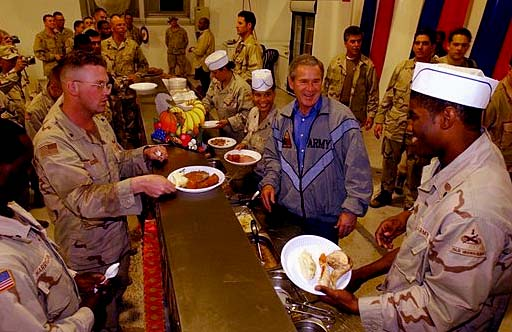
U.S. President George W. Bush meets with troops on Thanksgiving Day.

- November 12 – In Nasiriyah, at least 23 people, among them the first Italian casualties of the 2003 Iraq war are killed in a suicide bomb attack on an Italian police base.
- November 26
  - UK foreign minister Jack Straw pays a brief, surprise visit to Iraq.
  - Abed Hamed Mowhoush, Iraqi General, tortured to death by the USA Army personnel while in prison.
- November 27 – President Bush drops by for a surprise Thanksgiving dinner with soldiers in Baghdad with Condoleezza Rice.

=== December ===
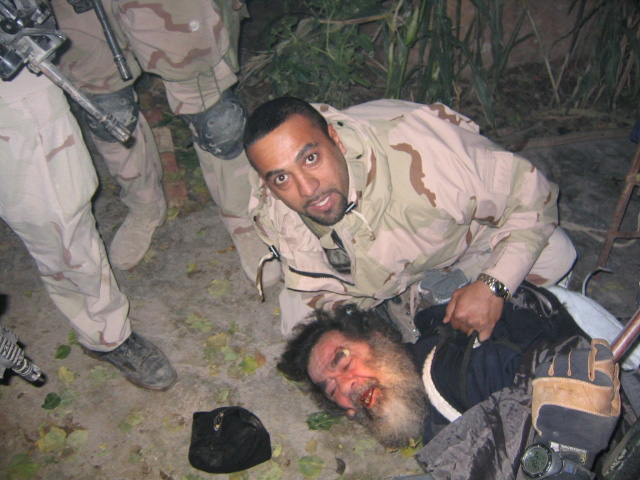
Saddam Hussein being pulled from his hideaway in Operation Red Dawn, December 13

- December 9 – Japan promises 1,000 troops to help with the reconstruction effort.
- December 13 – Saddam Hussein is captured by members of the 4th infantry division, 1st brigade. He was hiding in a spider hole in Ad Dawr, near Tikrit, his hometown. Saddam was captured in a hole below a two-room mud shack. When he was captured only a Styrofoam square and a rug were between Saddam and U.S. forces. Major General Raymond Odierno commented, “he was caught like a rat.”

"I am Saddam Hussein. I am the president of Iraq. I want to negotiate." – Saddam Hussein, upon surrendering.
"President Bush sends his regards." – Response from American soldiers accepting Saddam's surrender.
"Ladies and gentlemen, we got him." – Paul Bremer, announcing the capture at a press conference.

- December 27 – 2003 Karbala bombings

=== Date Unknown ===
- The University of Wasit and the University of Kirkuk are established.

== Births ==
- February 16 – Alai Fadel Ali, footballer.

== Deaths ==
- March 22 – Terry Lloyd, 50, ITN reporter killed in southern Iraq. (b.1952)
- April 6 – Lance Corporal Ian Malone, Irish soldier in the British Army, killed in Iraq.(b.1974)
- 10 April – Abdul-Majid al-Khoei, Iraqi Shia cleric. (1962)
- July 4 – Nizar Hamdoon, Iraqi politician.(b.1944)
- July 22 – Uday Hussein, Son of Saddam Hussain, killed in Mosul.(b.1964)
- July 22 – Qusay Hussein, Son of Saddam Hussain, killed in Mosul.(b.1966)
- August 19 – Sérgio Vieira de Mello, Brazilian diplomat who worked for the United Nations, killed in Iraq.(b.1948)
- 29 August – Mohammad Baqir al-Hakim, Iraqi Shia scholar and politician, assassinated in Najaf. (b.1939)
- September 25 – Aquila al-Hashimi, Iraq Interim Governing Council member.(b.1953)
- 26 November – Abed Hamed Mowhoush, Iraqi military officer, died in US custody. (b.1947)
- December 26 – Sgt. Michael Miholikis, United States National Guard, killed in Iraq.

== See also ==
- Iraq War
- 2003 invasion of Iraq
- Iraq disarmament crisis
