= 2004 in Iraq =

- Decades: 1980s; 1990s; 2000s; 2010s; 2020s
- See also: Other events of 2004; List of years in Iraq

Events in the year 2004 in Iraq.

== Incumbents ==
- Head of State -
  1. Government Administrator – L. Paul Bremer III (until June 28)
  2. President – Ghazi Mashal Ajil al-Yawer (from June 28)
  3. Vice President – Ibrahim al-Jaafari (from June 1)
  4. Vice President – Rowsch Shaways (from June 1)
- Head of Government -
  1. President of the Governing Council of Iraq – Adnan Pachachi (January 1 – January 31)
  2. President of the Governing Council of Iraq – Mohsen Abdel Hamid (February 1 – February 29)
  3. President of the Governing Council of Iraq – Mohammad Bahr al-Ulloum (March 1 – March 31)
  4. President of the Governing Council of Iraq – Massoud Barzani (April 1 – April 30)
  5. President of the Governing Council of Iraq – Ezzedine Salim (May 1 – May 17)
  6. President of the Governing Council of Iraq – Ghazi Mashal Ajil al-Yawer (May 17 – May 28)
  7. Prime Minister of Iraq – Ayad Allawi, (from May 28)

== Events ==
=== January ===
- January 10 – Protests in the city of Amarah because of an unemployment crisis. Police officers and soldiers open fire on demonstrators.
- January 15 – The United Nations call direct elections in advance of July impractical, due to continuing disorder and other factors.
- January 18 – A suicide bomber detonates a pickup truck packed with 1,000 pounds of explosives outside the headquarters of the US led coalition killing about 20 people and injuring more than 60 – most of them Iraqis.

=== February ===
- February 1 – During the Muslim eid, two suicide bombers kill 117 and wound 235 at two Kurdish buildings in the northern Iraqi city of Erbil. The bombers targeted the two offices for Iraq's main secular Kurdish parties packed with well-wishers. Sunni militant group Ansar al-Sunna claimed the attack.
- February 3 – The CIA admits that there was no imminent threat from weapons of mass destruction before the 2003 invasion of Iraq.
- February 7 – The Prince of Wales (now Charles III) begins a tour of the Middle East, visiting troops in Iraq.
- February 10 – At least 50 people killed in a car bomb attack on a police recruitment centre south of Baghdad.
- February 11 – Up to 47 people killed in a car bomb attack on an army recruiting centre in Baghdad.
- February 21 – The U.S. permits the Red Cross to visit Saddam Hussein for first time since his capture in December.

=== March ===
- March 2 – In the Ashoura Massacre almost 200 are killed in a series of bomb blasts in Baghdad and Karbala at the climax of the Shi'a festival of Aashurah. A combination of suicide bombers and mortars hit large Shi'ite crowds mourning outside revered shrines in Kerbala and Baghdad's Kadhimiya shrine.
- March 8
  - The governing council unanimously approves the country's new interim constitution
  - Abu Abbas dies in U.S. custody from natural causes.
- March 31 – Four American defense contractors are attacked and killed in Fallujah and their burned bodies are hung openly from a bridge.

=== April ===
- U.S. General Tommy Franks reportedly estimated soon after the invasion that there had been 30,000 Iraqi casualties as of April 9, 2003. After this initial estimate he made no further public estimates.
- April 2 – Al Sadr gives a heated sermon, which leads to the uprising of the Mahdi army.
- April 3 – Polish-Bulgarian defense of Karbala's City Hall starts.
- April 4 – Operation Vigilant Resolve begins in response to the mutilation on March 31 in Fallujah. U.S. coalition forces face tough opposition as the resistance uses Soviet-style defense in depth tactics.
- April 5 – U.S. forces seal off Fallujah
- April 6 – Defense of Karbala's City Hall ends with victory of Polish-Bulgarian troops
- April 7
  - U.S. forces fired upon a mosque compound in Fallujah. Officials claim that it was being used by insurgents to fire RPGs and mortars. Fox
  - After three days of fighting, the U.S. forces are only able to secure 15% of Fallujah in Operation Vigilant Resolve.
  - ar Ramadi is returned to the control of the Iraqi Police Services and Iraqi Civil Defense Corps.
- April 8 – The Mahdi army has taken full control in Kut and partial control of Najaf, Karbala and Kufa.
- April 9 – A civilian fuel convoy operated by private contractors Halliburton and Kellogg, Brown and Root is ambushed en route to Baghdad International Airport. The Mahdi Army is believed to be responsible for the attack. 7 civilians and several US Army Soldiers were killed in the attack. One of the truck drivers and one Soldier are still missing.
- April 10 – The U.S. forces declare a unilateral cease fire in Fallujah. Although the U.S. forces fight when provoked, they do not move to take more area.
- April 16 – Kut is retaken by coalition forces, but Najaf, Karbala and Kufa remain under control by Al Sadr.
- April 20 – 12 mortar rounds were fired on Abu Ghraib Prison by insurgents. 22 detainees were killed and 92 wounded.
- April 21 – At least 73 people were killed, including 17 children, along with 94 wounded in Iraq in suicide attacks on police stations in Basra and Az Zubayr.
- April 26 – The Iraq Interim Governing Council announced a new flag for post-Saddam Iraq. The flag is later abandoned among sentiments that it looks too much like Israel's flag.
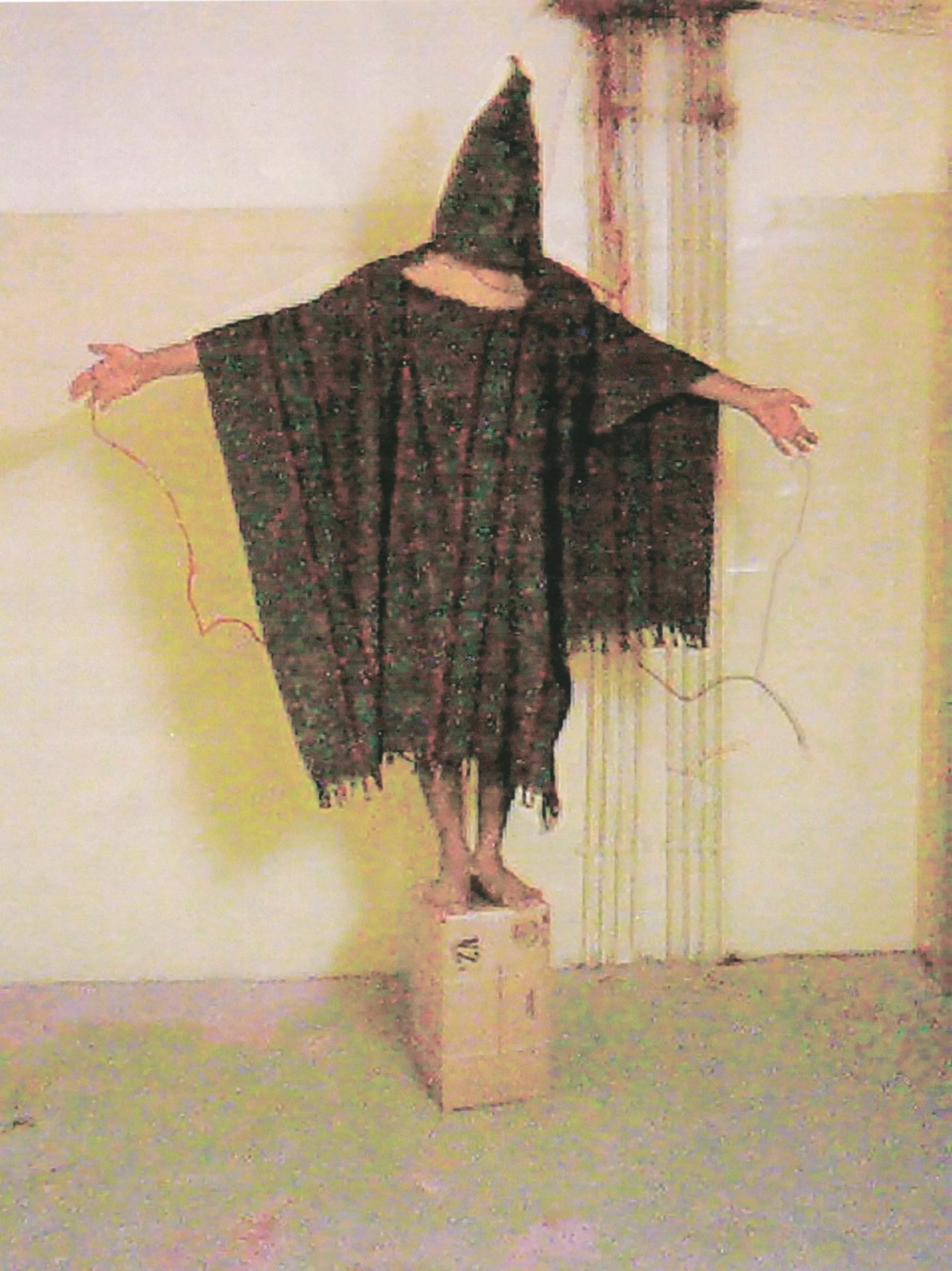
- Abu Ghraib prison abuse photo released April 2004
  April 28 – The program 60 Minutes II, airing on the CBS channel, revels shocking and gruesome images of prisoners at Abu Ghraib prison in Iraq being abused and tortured at the hands of American soldiers.
- April 29
  - The U.S. Marines announce it will pull out of Fallujah over a two- or three-week period and hand over control to the Iraqi army.
  - At least 600 civilians have been killed during the American attack on Falluja
  - 8 U.S. soldiers are killed and 4 wounded in a car bomb attack near Mahmudiyah, south of Baghdad.

=== May ===
- May 17 – A suicide car bomb in Baghdad kills the head of Iraq's Governing Council Abdul-Zahra Othman Mohammad, a prominent Shi'ite politician from Basra also known as Izzedin Salim. More than a dozen others were also killed in the blast at the gates of the fortified Green Zone in Baghdad.
- May 28 – Iyad Allawi is chosen as the prime minister for the interim Iraqi government. The handover is scheduled to take place on June 30.

=== June ===
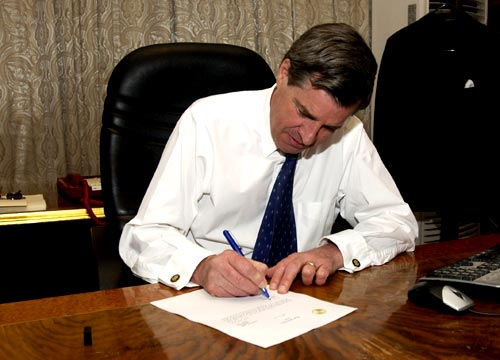
Paul Bremer signs over limited sovereignty to Iraq's interim government, June 28

- June 28 – Two days ahead of schedule, control and sovereignty of Iraq is handed over from the United States to an interim Iraqi government. Allawi becomes the prime minister, and Paul Bremer leaves the country. A slightly modified form of the flag is used.

=== July ===
- July 1 – Saddam Hussein goes on trial for war crimes, arraigned before an Iraqi judge on seven preliminary charges.
- July 12 – At a press conference, Prime Minister Allawi announces the creation of the General Security Directorate, a domestic intelligence agency.
- July 19 - FOB Chosin mortar attack, casualties listed in Stars and Stripes.

=== August ===
The new flag of Iraq

- August 5 – Marines from 1st Battalion 4th Marines begin battle in Najaf, Iraq. A new flag is created for the country.
- August 8 – United States Marine Jonathan Collins of Crystal Lake, Illinois was KIA in Al Ramadi, located in the Al Anbar Province.
- August 20 – Two French journalists, Christian Chesnot and Georges Malbrunot, are kidnaped while traveling between Baghdad and Najaf by the Islamic Army in Iraq.

=== September ===
- September 12 - The Haifa Street helicopter incident or the Haifa Street massacre was a controversial event in Baghdad, Iraq, on September 12, 2004. The fighting started before dawn on Haifa Street, where insurgents detonated two car bombs and attacked American troops with heavy gunfire. An American Bradley armored fighting vehicle was mobilized to support US troops, but it was struck by a car bomb around 6:30 a.m., wounding four American soldiers.

At around 8:00 a.m., an American helicopter fired two missiles and machine guns at the burning tank, killing 13 people and injuring about 60 others.

- September 14 – A car bomb near a crowded market and police station in a Shi'ite area of Baghdad kills at least 47 people and wounds 114.
- September 30 – Insurgents detonate three car bombs killing 41 people (34 of them children) in the Shi'ite Amil area of southern Baghdad. The blasts, which wounded 139, occurred shortly after U.S. troops had celebrated opening a new sewage system and distributed sweets to children.

=== October ===
- October 1 – An early morning coordinated invasion of Samarra by 3,000 US troops and 2,000 Iraqi troops begins. Iraqis take two religious sites by force. Americans claim to have killed as many as 125 insurgents.
- October 5 - An American soldier is killed after driving over a landmine in Latifiyah.
- October 9 – Major-General Tim Cross is appointed the new General Officer Commanding, Theatre Troops, commanding all British forces deployed in the country.
- October 10 – Tawhid and Jihad claims responsibility for two car bombs in Baghdad, killing at least 11 people including an American soldier, and wounding at least 16.
- October 12 – Army of Ansar al-Sunna claims to have beheaded Alaa al-Maliki. They claim he was a spy for the United States and Muqtada Al Sadr.
- October 12 – Germany's defense minister, Peter Struck, indicated that Germany might deploy troops in Iraq if conditions there change. This gesture appears to provide backing for John Kerry, the US Democratic presidential challenger.
- October 13 -
  - A suicide attack and roadside bombings kills six American soldiers.
  - Brigades of Abu Bakr Al-Sidiq, believed to be linked to al-Zarqawi, release a video via internet showing the beheading of two Iraqis: Fadhel Ibrahim and Firas Imeil, believed to be members of the Iraqi National Intelligence.
  - In a refusal of orders, American Army reservists participating in the Iraq War refused an order to drive a convoy of fuel tankers lacking armour plates through Baghdad on a "suicide mission".
- September 28 -
  - U.S. troops swept into the Sunni stronghold of Ramadi and joined Iraqi police and National Guardsmen in raids in Baqouba.
  - Investigators uncovered more than 100 bodies in a mass grave near the northern Iraqi village of Hatra. The bodies were believed to be Kurds killed during Saddam's crackdown in 1987–1988. The bodies includes those of small children and their mothers with bulletholes in their skulls.
- October 14 -
  - Two suicide bombers penetrate the highly guarded green zone in Baghdad and detonate bombs in their backpacks. 5 are killed, 4 of them Americans. 20 others are wounded. Tawhid and Jihad, a group connected to al-Zarqawi, claim responsibility. The bombers are reportedly Jordanians. This is the first successful attack in the green zone. AP
  - Ansar al-Sannah Army posts a video showing the beheading of a Turkish driver. AP
  - The U.S. responds to the suspension of talks with more air, artillery, and ground attacks. AP
- October 15 – A platoon in the 343rd Quartermaster Company refuses orders to convoy supplies from Tallil, Iraq to Taji, Iraq, citing safety concerns. They claim that their vehicles were unsafe and that the convoy isn't adequately protected. The Army launches an investigation. AP
- October 25 – Nearly 380 tons of conventional high-explosives are found missing from an Iraqi site formerly used by Saddam Hussein for his dismantled atom bomb program, that was never secured by the United States Army. It is reported by MSNBC that the site was looted in April 2003, before coalition troops reached the area. US troops reported at the time that the explosives were missing. MSNBC

=== November ===
- November 7 – The United States Marine Corps and the United States Army (1st Infantry Division) launched the bloodiest offensive of the Iraq War on November 7, 2004, Operation Phantom Fury against the insurgency in the city of Fallujah.
- November 10 – The Battle of Mosul (2004) officially begins even though intense fighting had already spread throughout the streets and city days before.

=== December ===
- December 19 – A suicide car bomb blast in Najaf, 300 metres from the Imam Ali shrine, near crowds of people, kills 52 and wounds at least 140. On the same day, a car bomb exploded in Kerbala, killing 14 and injuring at least 52.
- December 21 a huge explosion rocked a US-base in the northern city of Mosul killing 22 people (14 U.S. soldiers, 4 U.S. contractors and 4 Iraqi National guards) and wounding more than 70 people. At first, there were reports of a rocket attack but later it was said to be a suicide bomber. The Ansar al-Sunnah army in Iraq claimed responsibility. It was the deadliest single-attack on Americans (soldiers and civilians) in Iraq since the war ended on May 1, 2003.
- December 21, the French hostages Georges Malbrunot and Christian Chesnot were released, after having been taken hostage in August.
- December 27 – A suicide car bomber kills at least 13 people outside the offices of the Supreme Council for Islamic Revolution in Iraq (SCIRI), one of the largest Shi'ite parties in Iraq in the upscale Jadiriya area of Baghdad. Its leader Abdel Aziz al-Hakim said it was a failed attempt on his life and blamed the bombing on Sunni militants.

== Notable deaths ==
- January 24 – Abdul Rahman Munif, author
- February 28 – Andres Nuiamäe, 21, first Estonian soldier to be killed in Iraq
- March 8 – Abu Abbas, terrorist
- May 7 – Waldemar Milewicz, 48, Polish journalist, and Mounyra Beouamrane, killed in Iraq
- May 8 – (body found) Nick Berg, 26, American civilian killed in Iraq
- May 17 – Ezzedine Salim, 60?, president of the Iraqi Governing Council
- May 18 – Joseph "SSG G" Garyantes, 34, U.S. Army Staff Sergeant, M1 Abrams Tank Commander killed by sniper fire while on Combat Patrol in Muqdadiyah, Diyala Governorate Iraq.
- June 22 – Kim Sun-il, 33, South Korean translator, decapitated by Iraqi militants
- June 28 – Keith Matthew Maupin, 20, U.S. Army Private First Class, killed by Islamist militants in Iraq
- August 26 – Enzo G. Baldoni, 56, Italian journalist, murdered in Iraq
- September 20 – Eugene Armstrong, 52, American civilian contractor, beheaded by militants in Iraq.
- September 21 – Jack Hensley, 48, American civilian contractor, beheaded by militants in Iraq.
- October 7 – Ken Bigley, 62, British hostage in Iraq, executed by hostage takers
- October 28 – Shosei Koda, 24, Japanese backpacker, beheaded by his captors in Iraq
- November 16 – Margaret Hassan, 59, British-born Iraqi chief of the humanitarian relief organization CARE International, killed by hostage takers in Iraq (unconfirmed, but presumed dead)

== See also ==
- Iraq War
