= 1998 in Iraq =

- Decades: 1970s; 1980s; 1990s; 2000s; 2010s
- See also: Other events of 1998; List of years in Iraq

The following lists events that happened during 1998 in Iraq.

== Incumbents ==
- President: Saddam Hussein
- Prime Minister: Saddam Hussein
- Vice President:
  - Taha Muhie-eldin Marouf
  - Taha Yassin Ramadan
  - Izzat Ibrahim al-Douri

== Events ==
- 18 February – Around 2,000 protesters gather in front of the White House protesting the US threats of military strikes in Iraq.
- 22 February – UN Secretary General Kofi Annan arrives at an agreement with Iraqi officials to resolve the crisis over UN inspections teams' presence in Iraq.
- 28 April – Construction starts on the Umm al-Qura Mosque, one of the largest mosques in Iraq.
- 29 September – The Kurdish civil war officially ends with the signing of the Washington agreement.
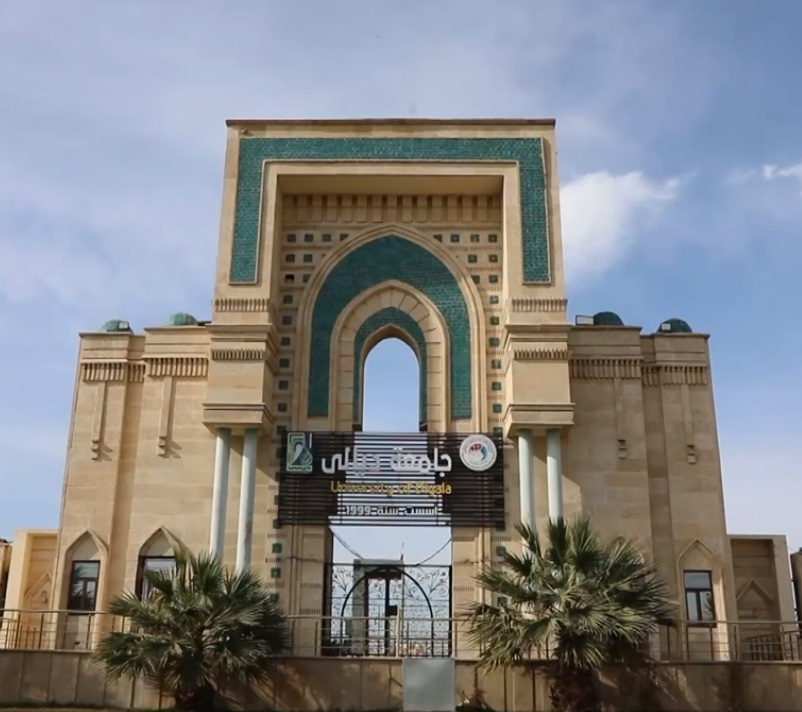
- University of Diyala
  November 13 – After Iraq commits to United Nations Special Commission, American President Bill Clinton cancels scheduled air raids on the country.
- November 23 – Iraq stops their UNSCOM partnership.
- 16-19 December –The United States and Britain carry out a bombing campaign targeting Iraqi sites, the operation codenamed Operation Desert Fox.

=== Date Unknown ===
- The University of Diyala is established.

== Births ==
- 7 January – Sajjad Jasim Mousa, footballer.

== Deaths ==
- 27 September – Hadi Alwai, intellectual and historian.(b.1932)

=== Date Unknown ===
- Abd al-Malik Nuri, Iraqi writer. (b.1921)
- Rabab Al-Kadhimi, Iraqi poet and surgeon.(b.1918).
