= Americablog =

American liberal blog

- Website type: Blog
- Creator: John Aravosis
- Editor: John Aravosis
- Website: americablog.com
- Launched: April 2004; 22 years ago
- Current status: defunct

Americablog (stylized as AMERICAblog) was an American liberal blog founded by John Aravosis in April 2004, with several co-bloggers. The blog helped expose Jeff Gannon in 2005, and in 2006 helped make cell phone privacy an issue by obtaining General Wesley Clark's call records. The blog focused on U.S. politics.

== Members ==
- John Aravosis, lawyer, journalist, Democratic political consultant, and civil rights advocate who served five years as the senior foreign policy adviser to United States Senator Ted Stevens (R-AK), and wrote as a stringer for the Economist.
- Joe Sudbay, Democratic political consultant and former gun control activist, held staff positions with Violence Policy Center, and Handgun Control, Inc.
- Chris Ryan, who lives in Paris, France.
- Steven Kyle, a professor in economics at Cornell University.
- Naomi Seligman, a communications professional from Santa Monica, California.

== History ==
Americablog first received widespread media attention after it revealed that Jeff Gannon, a member of the White House press corps with a reputation for asking "softball" questions at opportune moments for Press Secretary Scott McClellan, was actually James Guckert and had advertised his services as an escort.

In 2006, Aravosis learned that a number of commercial websites were selling people's private cell phone records, and that the practice was legal. In order to publicize what he considered a problem, Aravosis purchased the call records of former presidential candidate and Supreme Allied Commander of NATO General Wesley Clark for $89.95, and then published the records (with the numbers blacked out) on Americablog, bringing the issue widespread attention. In September 2006, California passed a state law banning the practice of pretexting, or pretending to be someone else, used by the websites, with the bill's sponsor specifically citing the Americablog coverage. Clark became an advocate of cell record privacy bills in Congress. Within months, Congress passed a law restricting these records.

In 2011, Aravosis received a tip that British oil giant BP (British Petroleum) was posting falsified photos to its website during the Deepwater Horizon oil spill. He analyzed the photos, then published an article on Americablog proving that the images were doctored electronically. The story received widespread coverage in the media.

Americablog ceased posting new content in February 2022.

== Rankings ==
A study of blogs and the 2004 U.S. presidential election ranked Americablog as the 18th most popular liberal blog for October–November 2004. In 2005, less than one year after its launch, Americablog was ranked fifth in page views among all political blogs in an analysis done by MyDD. In 2008, PC Magazine ranked Americablog as one of the "20 best political Web sites." At the time, PC Magazine wrote: "You'll want to keep Americablog on your radar." In 2009, Americablog was ranked as one of the top ten political blogs by the Personal Democracy Forum, and as the 23rd most popular political blog by Wikio. In 2010, Technorati ranked Americablog in the top 100 political blogs and top 100 US politics blogs, and in 2013 Pingdom cited Americablog as one of the top 100 blogs. The New York Times includes Americablog among 17 "politics & government" blog that it recommends. Rolling Stone once wrote of Americablog: "We trust you are all reading Americablog ... you'll be better Amurricans for it."
