= Sinophile =

Someone with a strong interest in or love of Chinese people, culture, or history

Chinese name
- Traditional Chinese: 親華派/親華者
- Simplified Chinese: 亲华派/亲华者
- Hanyu Pinyin: Qīn huá pài/Qīn huá zhě
Transcriptions
Standard Mandarin
- Hanyu Pinyin: Qīn huá pài/Qīn huá zhě
Wu
- Romanization: Chin1 Gho6 Pha5 (tɕʰin53 ɦo23 pʰʌ34)
Hakka
- Pha̍k-fa-sṳ: Tshîn-fà-phai / Tshîn-fà-chá
Yue: Cantonese
- Jyutping: Can1 Waa4 Paai3 / Can1 Waa4 Ze2
Southern Min
- Hokkien POJ: Chhin-hôa-phài / Chhin-hôa-chiá
- Tâi-lô: Tshin-huâ-phài / Tshin-huâ-tsiá

Vietnamese name
- Vietnamese alphabet: thân Trung Quốc, thân Trung Hoa, thân Tàu
- Chữ Nôm: 親中國, 親中華, 親艚

A Sinophile is a person who demonstrates fondness or strong interest in China, Chinese culture, Chinese history, Chinese politics, or Chinese people.

== Etymology ==
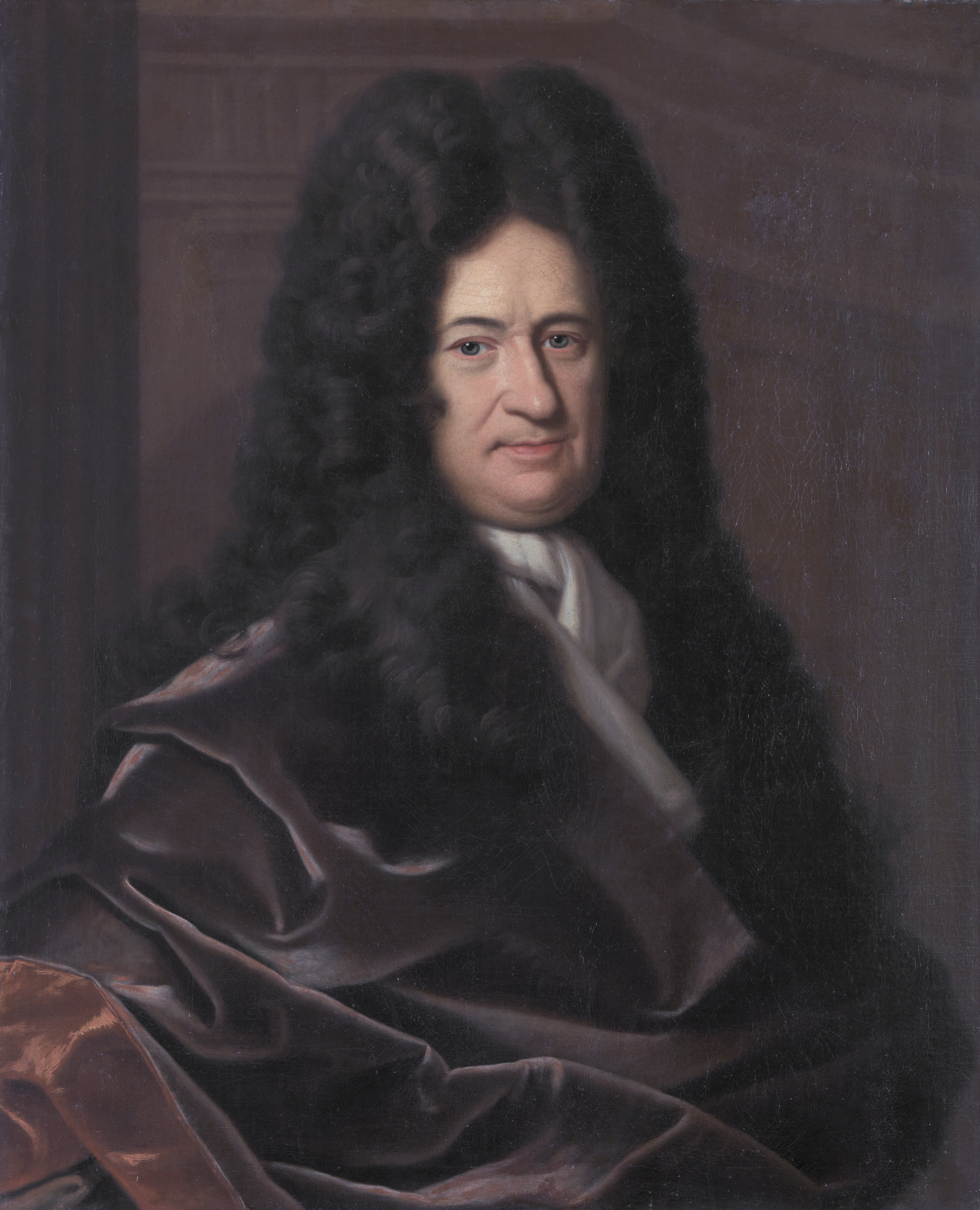
Gottfried Wilhelm Leibniz, a 17th–18th century German polymath who made significant contributions in many areas of physics, logic, history, librarianship, and studied numerous aspects of Chinese culture

The word Sinophile is derived from the prefix Sino- (referring to anything in relation to China) and the suffix -phile (meaning the lover of something). The word itself emerged in the early 20th century.

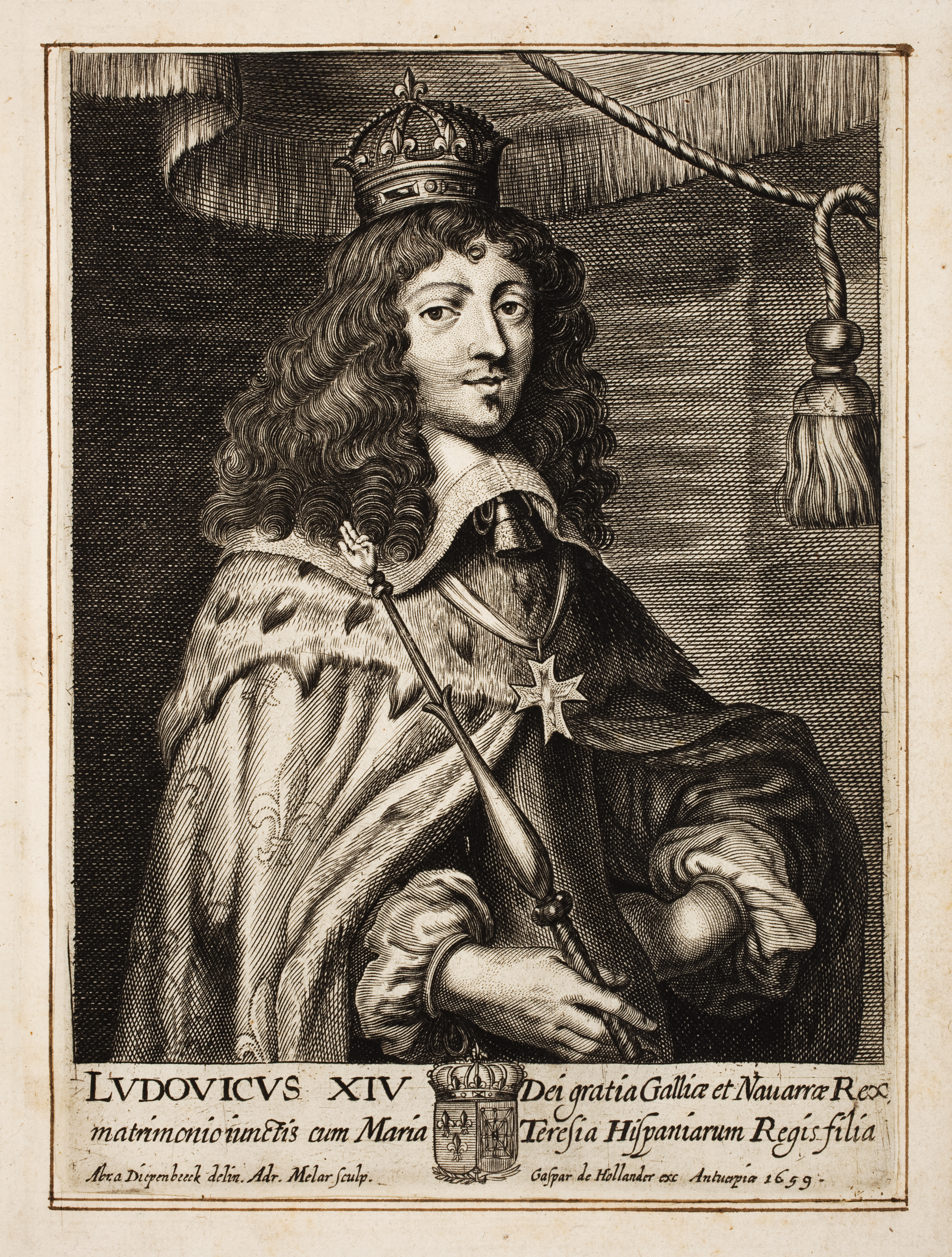
Louis XIV, a 17th-century French monarch whose Grand Trianon, spread of Chinoiserie, centennial new year bash, and Confucian translations were influenced by Chinese culture

== Notable Sinophiles ==
=== Europe ===
==== United Kingdom ====
- Joseph Needham, a British biochemist, historian and sinologist known for his research on the history of Chinese science and technology, initiating publication of the multi-volume Science and Civilisation in China.

==== France ====
- Louis XIV, a 17th-century French monarch whose Grand Trianon, spread of Chinoiserie, centennial new year bash, and Confucian translations were influenced by Chinese culture.
- Voltaire, a 17th-century French philosopher who admired Chinese culture and Confucian thought.

==== Germany ====
- Gottfried Wilhelm Leibniz, a 17th-century German polymath who wrote about his admiration of the Chinese "idea of things being created by their natural propensity and by a pre-established harmony" in a letter written in the last year of his life (1716).

==== Italy ====
- Marco Polo (c. 1254–1324), Italian explorer who was one of the first Europeans to visit China and narrated about the nation in his travelogue, The Travels of Marco Polo
- Matteo Ricci (1552–1610), Italian Jesuit who was the first to translate the Confucian classics into Latin and taught European science to the Emperor and the Chinese literati

==== Russia ====
- Dmitri Mendeleev (1834–1907), Russian chemist and inventor
- Leo Tolstoy (1828–1910), Russian writer widely considered one of the world's greatest novelists

=== Oceania ===
==== Australia ====
- Paul Keating (born 1944), Prime Minister of Australia from 1991 to 1996
- Kevin Rudd (born 1957), Prime Minister of Australia from 2007 to 2010 and in 2013. Rudd took up Chinese in college and is fluent in Mandarin, but his Sinophile characterisation has been disputed.

=== North America ===
==== United States ====
- Allen Iverson (born 1975), former NBA star basketball player who has expressed affinity for the country
- Stephon Marbury (born 1977), former NBA star basketball player who joined the Beijing Ducks and has expressed affinity for the country
- James Veneris (1922–2004), US soldier who defected to China after the Korean War and remained in the country expressing positive feelings until his death in 2004
- Jeffrey Sachs (born 1954), American economist from Columbia University who has been a strong advocate for greater China-US engagement and friendship between the two peoples
- Hasan Piker (born 1991), popular socialist American Twitch Streamer who has expressed affinity and admiration for the Chinese people and visited China to help American left-wingers better understand the country

=== Asia ===
==== Iran ====
- Majid Majidi (born 1959), Iranian filmmaker who has been described by China Radio International as "a longtime friend of the Chinese people".

==== Iraq ====
- Jalal Al-Hanafi (1914-2006), a well-known Iraqi scholar who taught Arabic in China and enthusiastically promoted cultural exchanges between the two countries.
- Hadi Alwai (1932-1998), a prominent exiled intellectual who travelled periodically between Syria and China, and held deep affinity for Chinese philosophies.

==== Thailand ====
- Sirindhorn (born 1955), Thai princess who has received awards in China for promoting friendship between the two countries

== See also ==
- Chinamaxxing
- Chinoiserie
- Sinology
