= Walid Hassan =

Walid Hassan may refer to:

- Walid Hassan (comedian) (1959–2006), Iraqi comedian and actor
- Walid Hassan (footballer) (born 1991), Sudanese footballer
