= Talon News =

American website

Talon News is an American website, established in April 2003, which became newsworthy in January 2005 because alleged irregularities in the background of its chief correspondent, known as Jeff Gannon, came to light. Gannon, born James Dale Guckert, resigned from Talon on February 8, 2005. The Talon News website was shut down on February 23, 2005, but was later revived as a parody.

== Organization ==
A virtual organization with no physical office space or newsroom, Talon News was owned by a conservative activist group called GOPUSA. Robert Eberle, the president and CEO of GOPUSA, held both titles for Talon News as well.

According to Media Matters for America, "Talon News apparently consists of little more than (Robert) Eberle, (Jeff) Gannon, and a few volunteers, and is virtually indistinguishable from GOPUSA.com.

Initially, Talon News made its articles available on their website, but in September 2004, moved them to GOPUSA.com and simply re-directed visitors asking for the full news articles there with the statement "This story can be found on our #1 client — GOPUSA!". In January 2005, during the controversy, Talon News removed information from its biography section regarding some of its employees, including the reporter at the center of the controversy, Jeff Gannon.

The Talon News site went entirely off line on February 23, 2005, to "re-evaluate operations." Since May 2007, the Talon News site has been a parody, and its pages link to The Firesign Theatre's site.

== Controversy ==
Media Matters raised the question of Talon News' legitimacy with respect to Gannon's loaded questions at White House press conferences, such as asking then President George W. Bush how he would work with Democrats who had "divorced themselves from reality." Washington Post columnist Dan Froomkin noted in his February 19, 2004, column that "Within the press corps, Gannon is known for asking softball questions." Media Matters also discovered that the Talon News operation seemed as more of an arm of the PAC GOPUSA than a legitimate journalistic enterprise. Both groups were run out of the same address (Eberle's home), Talon News items were culled from the GOPUSA website, and Talon News "journalists" lacked significant journalistic experience but had a lengthy history in conservative activism.

The Standing Committee of Correspondents rejected Gannon's application for a Capitol Hill press pass because of Talon News' lack of independence from a political organization. Committee chairman Jim Drinkard wrote in his letter:

The application for accreditation to the press galleries states that "members of the press shall not engage in lobbying or paid advertising, publicity, promotion, work for any individual, political party, corporation, organization, or agency of the Federal Government." Talon News has not demonstrated to the satisfaction of the committee that there is a separation from GOPUSA/Millions of Americans.com.

=== Jeff Gannon/James Guckert ===
Gannon submitted his resignation from Talon News effective February 8, 2005. On February 10, Gannon said in a CNN interview that Talon News is a legitimate conservative online news service. He also stated; "Talon News is a separate, independent news division. I work for Talon News. I write articles for Talon News." On February 20, 2005, The New York Times quoted Eberle, who said he had no inkling that Gannon may have created pornographic web sites or offered himself as a gay escort. If he had known, Eberle said, "I don't think I would have brought him on."

In 2007, Gannon published a book titled "The Great Media War", in which he attacks his critics and criticizes liberal media bias. He maintained a blog through 2007.
