= Atika Wahbi al-Khazraji =

Iraqi poet and educator

'Atika Wahbi al-Khazraji (Arabic: عاتكة وهبي الخزرجي; 14 November 1924 – 9 November 1997) was an Iraqi poet and educator.

Al-Khazraji was born in Baghdad, she was talented with poetry from a young age and began writing as young as ten years old, and published her poems at the age of fourteen in Iraqi magazines. She received a BA from the Higher Teachers' Institute, going on to work as a teacher. In 1950, she enrolled in the Sorbonne, receiving a PhD in 1955. She published a collection of the poet Abbas Ibn al-Ahnaf's work in 1954. She later taught Arabic at the Higher Teachers' Institute. She published a work on the poet Isma'il Sabri.

== Selected works ==
- Majnun Layla (Crazy for Layla) (1954)
- Anfas al-sihr (Breaths of magic) (1963)
- La'la' alqamar (The moon shimmered) (1965)
- Afwaf al-zahr (The flower's membranes) (1975)
