= 2000 in Iraq =

- Decades: 1980s; 1990s; 2000s; 2010s; 2020s
- See also: Other events of 2000; List of years in Iraq

The following lists events that happened during 2000 in Iraq.

== Incumbents ==
- President: Saddam Hussein
- Prime Minister: Saddam Hussein
- Vice President:
  - Taha Muhie-eldin Marouf
  - Taha Yassin Ramadan
  - Izzat Ibrahim al-Douri

== Events ==
- 27 March – Iraqi Parliamentary elections are held, resulting in the Ba'ath Party winning 165 out of 250 seats, the remaining seats were split between 55 independents and 30 government appointed to representatives of Kurdistan.
- Last case of Polio recorded in Iraq.

== Births ==
- 20 June – Mohanad Ali, footballer.
- 23 September – Hasan Raed Hasan, footballer
- 10 November – Maytham Jabbar Mutlag,footballer

== Deaths ==
- 8 April – Ibrahim Ahmad, Iraqi Kurdish writer and translator, founder of the Patriotic Union of Kurdistan. (b.1914)
