= 2001 in Iraq =

- Decades: 1980s; 1990s; 2000s; 2010s; 2020s
- See also: Other events of 2001; List of years in Iraq

The following lists events that happened during 2001 in the Iraqi Republic.

== Incumbents ==
- President: Saddam Hussein
- Prime Minister: Saddam Hussein
- Vice President: Taha Muhie-eldin Marouf
- Vice President: Taha Yassin Ramadan

== Events ==
=== February ===
- February 16 – British and U.S. forces carry out bombing raids, attempting to disable Iraq's air defense network.
- February 17 – Baghdad is bombed by US and UK war planes, killing three people.
- February 19 – The Arab world and the UN Security Council criticize the attacks by the US and UK two days ago.
- February 20 – The critics of the raids by the UK and US claim that foreign ministers are planning to refine the sanctions against Iraq.

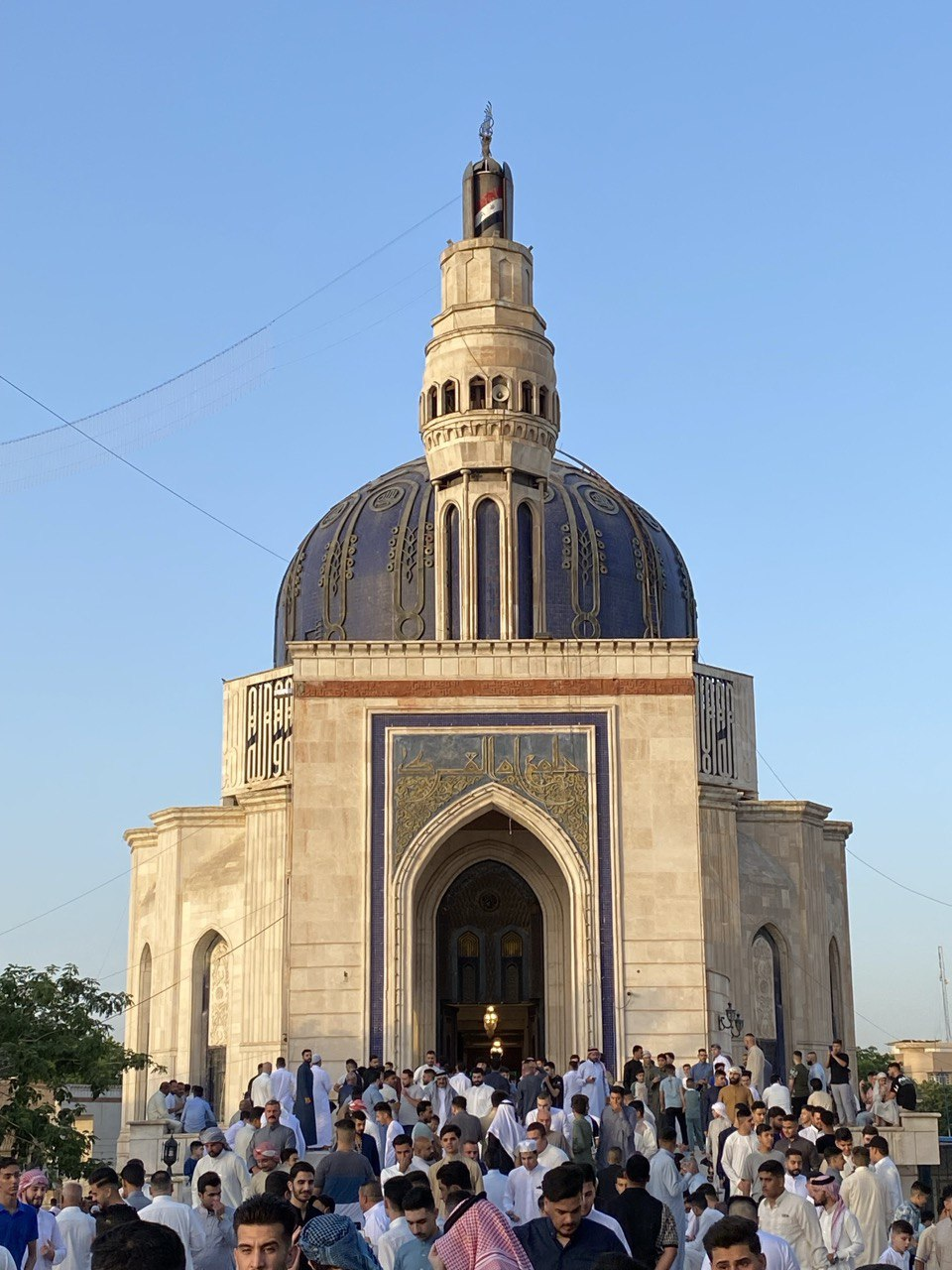
Umm Al-Qura Mosque

=== April ===
- 28 April – Construction of the Umm al-Qura Mosque, one of the largest mosques in Iraq, is completed.

=== August ===
- August 27 – A U.S. Military RQ-1B Predator unmanned aerial vehicle failed to return from a routine reconnaissance mission, Iraq claims to have shot it down.

=== September ===
- September 11 – 2,996 killed in the September 11 attacks on the World Trade Center in New York City, New York, The Pentagon in Arlington, Virginia, and Shanksville, Pennsylvania. Saddam Hussein immediately declares that his government played no part in the attacks. Also that day a U.S. military RQ-1B Predator drone crashed near Basra, Iraq claims to have shot it down.

== Births ==
- 29 January – Zaid Tahseen, footballer.

== Deaths ==
- 18 February – Franso Hariri, Iraqi Assyrian politician.(b.1937)

=== Date Unknown ===
- Su'ad Salim, artist and cartoonist. (b. 1918)
