= 2002 in Iraq =

- Decades: 1980s; 1990s; 2000s; 2010s; 2020s
- See also: Other events of 2002; List of years in Iraq

Events in the year 2002 in Iraq.

== Incumbents ==
- President - Saddam Hussein
- Prime Minister - Saddam Hussein
- Vice President - Taha Muhie-eldin Marouf
- Vice President - Taha Yassin Ramadan

== Events ==
The CIA's Special Activities Division (SAD) teams were the first U.S. forces to enter Iraq in July 2002, prior to the US Invasion. Once on the ground, they prepared for the subsequent arrival of US Army Special Forces to organize the Kurdish Peshmerga. In Operation Viking Hammer, this joint team (called the Northern Iraq Liaison Element (NILE)) combined to defeat Ansar al-Islam, an ally of Al Qaeda, in the North East corner of Iraq. This battle was for control of a territory that was occupied by Ansar al-Islam and was executed prior to the invasion. It was carried out by Paramilitary Operations Officers from SAD and the Army's 10th Special Forces Group. This battle was a significant defeat of a key terrorist organization and the uncovering of a chemical weapons facility at Sargat. Sargat was the only facility of its type discovered in the Iraq war.

SAD teams also conducted missions behind enemy lines to identify leadership targets. These missions led to the initial strikes against Saddam Hussein and his Generals. Although the strike against Saddam was unsuccessful in killing him, it was successful in effectively ending his ability to command and control his forces. Other strikes against his Generals were successful and significantly degraded the command's ability to react to, and maneuver against the US led invasion force. SAD operations officers were also successful in convincing key Iraqi Army officers into surrendering their units once the fighting started.

Turkey refused to allow the US Army entry into Northern Iraq. Therefore, joint SAD and Army Special forces teams and the Kurdish Peshmerga were the entire Northern force against Saddam. They managed to keep Saddam's Army in place rather than moving the northern army to contest the US led coalition force coming from the south. The efforts of the Kurds, SAD and 10th Special Forces Group with the Kurds likely saved the lives of many US and coalition forces during and after the invasion. As described by Mike Tucker and Charles Faddis in their book entitled, "Operation Hotel California: The Clandestine War Inside Iraq", four of these CIA officers were awarded the Intelligence Star for their heroic actions.

=== January ===
January 29 – US President George W. Bush placed Iraq on the axis of evil, along with Iran and North Korea, for developing weapons of mass destruction, violating human rights, and enmity with the United States.

=== July ===
- July 5 – Saddam Hussein again rejects new U.N. weapons inspections proposals.

=== August ===
- August 2 – Saddam Hussein invites chief weapons inspector Hans Blix to Iraq for discussions on remaining disarmament issues.
- August 19
  - The U.N. Secretary General rejects Iraq's August 2 proposal as the "wrong work program", and instead recommends that Iraq allow weapons inspectors to return to the country, in accordance with previous U.N. resolutions.
  - Terrorist Abu Nidal dies in his home in Baghdad from multiple gunshot wounds. Deputy Prime Minister Tariq Aziz claims the wounds were self-inflicted.

=== September ===
- September 12 – U.S. President George W. Bush, addresses the U.N. and challenges its members to confront the "grave and gathering danger" of Iraq or stand aside as the United States and likeminded nations act.

=== October ===
- October – In October 2002, a few days before the U.S. Senate voted on the Joint Resolution to Authorize the Use of United States Armed Forces Against Iraq, about 75 senators were told in closed session that Iraq had the means of attacking the eastern seaboard of the U.S. with biological or chemical weapons delivered by unmanned aerial vehicles (UAVs.) On February 5, 2003, Colin Powell presented further evidence in his Iraqi WMD program presentation to the UN Security Council that UAVs were ready to be launched against the U.S. At the time, there was a vigorous dispute within the US military and intelligence community as to whether conclusions about Iraqi UAVs were accurate. The U.S. Air Force agency most familiar with UAVs denied that Iraq possessed any offensive UAV capability, saying the few they had were designed for surveillance and intended for reconnaissance. In fact, Iraq's UAV fleet was never deployed and consisted of a handful of outdated 24.5-foot (7.5 m) wingspan drones with no room for more than a camera and video recorder, and no offensive capability. Despite this controversy, the Senate voted to approve the Joint Resolution on October 11, 2002 providing the Bush Administration with the legal basis for the U.S. invasion under US law.
- October 2 – The U.S. Congress passes a joint resolution which explicitly authorized the President to use the Armed Forces of the United States as he determines to be necessary and appropriate in Iraq.
- October 16 – U.S. President George W. Bush signs the Iraq war resolution.

=== November ===
- November 8 – UN Security Council Resolution 1441 – The United Nations Security Council unanimously approves a resolution on Iraq, forcing Saddam Hussein to disarm or face "serious consequences".
- November 18 – United Nations weapons inspectors led by Hans Blix arrive in Iraq.

=== December ===
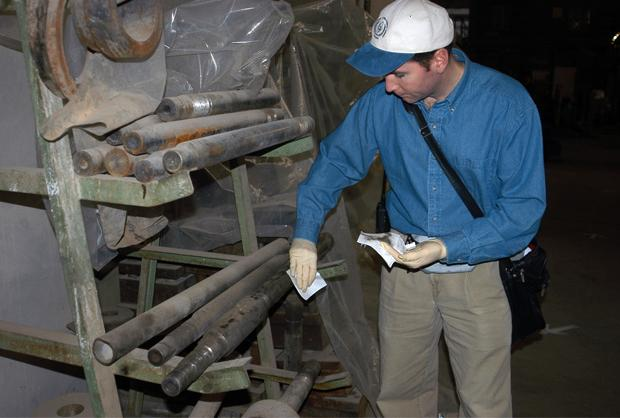
A UN weapons inspector in Iraq

- December 7 – As required by UN Security Council Resolution 1441, Iraq files a 12,000 page weapons declaration with the U.N. Security Council. Although it is supposed to be a complete declaration, it is seen as incomplete by the Security Council and weapons inspectors.

=== Date Unknown ===
- The University of Karbala and the University of Thi Qar are established.

== Notable births ==
- 11 June – Mired bin Ra'ad, son of Prince Ra'ad bin Zeid, head of the defunct Iraqi royal line.
- October 14 – Youssif, burn victim.

== Notable deaths ==
- 12 October – Heshu Yones, murder victim. (b.1986)

== See also ==
- Iraq disarmament crisis
