= Hayat Sharara =

Iraqi writer, translator and educator (1935 – 1997)

- حياة شرارة
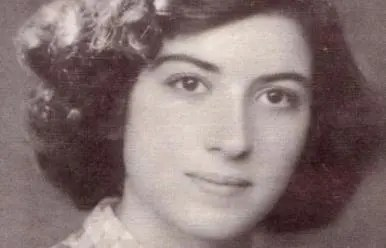
- Born: c. 1935
- Died: 1 August 1997 (aged 61–62)

Hayat Sharara (Arabic:حياة شرارة ; c.1935 – August 1, 1997) was an Iraqi writer, translator and educator.

She was born in Najaf. Her family moved to Baghdad in the mid-1940s. Sharara graduated from high school and completed her baccalaureate but could not attend Baghdad University because she was unable to obtain the necessary certificate of good conduct due to her political activism. She was told that she must join the Ba'ath Party if she wished to keep her university job. After she refused, she was transferred to a job as an interpreter for the Ministry of Industry.

Sharara and her daughter Maha, who had also been discriminated against in hiring due to her mother's political activism, committed suicide in 1997.

Her semi-autobiographical novel Idha al-Ayyam Aghsaqat ("When darkness falls"), which she completed shortly before her death, was published posthumously in 2000. Her sister wrote an introduction, which was translated into English.
