= 1999 in Iraq =

- Decades: 1970s; 1980s; 1990s; 2000s; 2010s
- See also: Other events of 1999; List of years in Iraq

The following lists events that happened during 1999 in Iraq.

== Incumbents ==
- President: Saddam Hussein
- Prime Minister: Saddam Hussein
- Vice President:
  - Taha Muhie-eldin Marouf
  - Taha Yassin Ramadan
  - Izzat Ibrahim al-Douri

== Events ==
- 8 January – United States officials admit to using UNSCOM to collect intelligence against the Iraqi government.
- 19 February – The Second Sadr uprising breaks out in majority Shia cities and neighborhoods in Iraq after a Shia cleric, Muhammad al-Sadr is assassinated in Najaf.
- 6 November – A delegation in support of listing the sanctions on Iraq led by British MP George Galloway arrives in Baghdad. The delegation, which left London using a double-decker bus on September 2, 1999, passed through few countries on its route, raising funds for cancer treatment for Iraqi children and highlighting the humanitarian cost of the sanctions.
- 17 December – United Nations Security Council Resolution 1284 is adopted, replacing UNSCOM with the United Nations Monitoring, Verification and Inspection Commission (UNMOVIC).

=== Date Unknown ===
- Eighteen Thousand Iraqis are turned down at the Iraqi-Saudi border and not allowed to perform Hajj, due to the UN not releasing Iraqi funds designated for their travel expenses.

== Births ==
- 1 January –Hasan Abdulkareem Jabbar, footballer
- 1 January – Ahmed Farhan Mushref, footballer
- 18 August – Hussein Ammar Ameen, footballer

== Deaths ==
- 19 February – Muhammad al-Sadr, Shia cleric (b.1943)
- 3 August – Abd al-Wahhab Al-Bayati, poet (b.1926)
- 3 August – Mohammed Hadid, politician. (b.1907)
- 11 October – Rafi Daham al-Tikriti, former director of the Iraqi Intelligence Service.(b.1937)
