= Raad Mutar Saleh =

Sheikh Raad Mutar Saleh (died October 11, 2006) led the tiny Mandaean community in Iraq until being shot dead by unknown assassins in Suweira, 65 km southeast of Baghdad in the Tigris river valley.
