= Operation Planet X =

2003 US army operation in Iraq

- Part of The war on terrorism, Operation Iraqi Freedom
Date	Early 15 May 2003
Location	a village near Ad-Dawr, 11 miles (18 km) south of Tikrit, Iraq
Result	Gen. Mahdi Al-Duri Al-Tikrit Adil Abdallah was captured along with 260 other prisoners, his bodyguards and members of his family

Belligerents
United States; Iraq	Iraqi Insurgency

During Operation Iraqi Freedom, Operation Planet X was a US Army mechanized raid conducted on a village near Ad-Dawr in Salah Al-Din province 11 miles (18 km) north of Tikrit on the night of 15 May 2003 by elements of the 1st Brigade Combat Team, U.S. 4th Infantry Division and Task Force Ironhorse in search of Ba'ath party members and militants.

The name of the operation may have been inspired by the cartoon Duck Dodgers in the 24½th Century.

As a result of this effort a key member of the former regime, Gen. Mahdi Al-Duri Al-Tikrit Adil Abdallah was captured along with 260 other prisoners.

US fighting forces involved roughly 500 soldiers, 18 M2A3 Bradley Fighting Vehicles, 12 artillery pieces, 30 HMMWVs, and 6 patrol boats.

== Military Units Involved ==
US forces reported to be involved were

- 1st Brigade Combat Team, U.S. 4th Infantry Division
- Task Force Ironhorse
- 1st Squadron, 11th Armored Cavalry Regiment

Iraqi Units involved

- 4th Battalion, 1st Iraqi Army
- 2nd Battalion, 3rd Iraqi Army

== Casualties ==
No US, Coalition or Iraqi casualties or deaths were reported during the operation.
