= Andres Nuiamäe =

Estonian soldier (1982–2004)

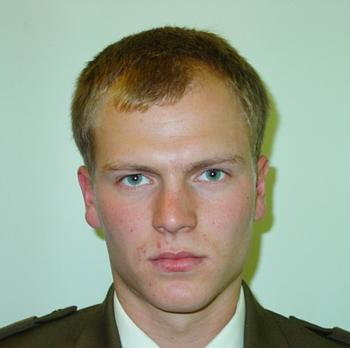
- Junior Sergeant Andres Nuiamäe; An Estonian soldier of the ESTPLA-8
- Born: 2 June 1982; Lehtse, Lääne-Viru County, then part of Estonian SSR, Soviet Union
- Died: 28 February 2004 (aged 21); Abu Ghurayb district, Baghdad, Iraq
- Military career
- Allegiance: Estonia
- Branch: Estonia, NATO
- Service years: 1999–2004
- Rank: Junior Sergeant
- Unit: Scouts Battalion
- Conflicts: Iraq War

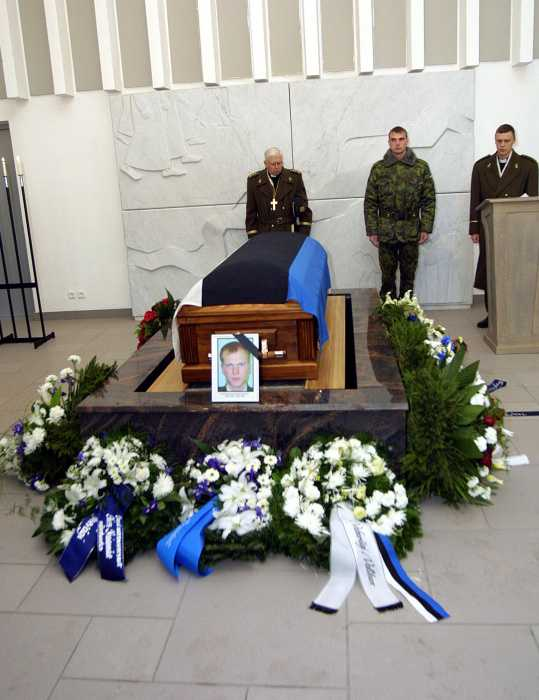
Andres Nuiamäe's funeral was held on 28 February 2004 in his home village Albu.

Andres Nuiamäe (2 June 1982 – 28 February 2004) was a Junior Sergeant of the Estonian Ground Forces, assigned to the ESTPLA-8 unit in Baghdad, Iraq. He holds the distinction of being the first Estonian soldier serving in an independent Estonian army to be killed in combat since 1920, and the first Estonian soldier to be killed in the Iraq War.

== Biography ==
Andres Nuiamäe was born in Lehtse, Lääne-Viru County. Nuiamae was part of a 12-man foot patrol when an improvised explosive device detonated near the Abu Ghuraib market in Baghdad at 20:55 local time on 28 February 2004. He was 21 years when he was killed.

Nuiamäe's death shocked the population of Estonia and sparked a debate amongst the country's citizens on whether Estonia should continue to keep troops stationed in Iraq. However, the Estonian government held firm in its stance to remain part of the "Coalition of the Willing". In a prepared statement released shortly after Andres Nuiamäe's death, Estonian Prime Minister Juhan Parts said:

"This is an extremely painful reminder that the situation in Iraq has not yet stabilized and that joint efforts for peace by the coalition forces are well founded."

Following Nuiamäe's funeral, the President of Estonia, Arnold Rüütel, released the following statement on 29 February 2004:

"I express profound sympathy and condolences to the family, loved ones and fellow servicemen of Andres Nuiamäe. The death of this brave young man in Iraq is an irretrievable loss to both his family and the whole of Estonia. At this sad moment, let us all think about duty, sense of responsibility, mission and the price of ensuring it. Estonia is mourning."

On 10 March 2004, President Arnold Rüütel posthumously awarded Nuiamäe the Order of the Cross of the Eagle.

On 26 October 2004, Estonia suffered its second Iraqi War casualty when 28-year-old First Sergeant Arre Illenzeer was similarly killed by explosives.
