= Jeff Gannon =

American journalist (born 1957)

- Born: James Dale Guckert; May 22, 1957 (age 69)
- Education: West Chester University
- Occupations: Writer, journalist

James Dale Guckert (born May 22, 1957) is an American conservative columnist better known by the pseudonym Jeff Gannon. Between 2003 and 2005, he was given credentials as a White House reporter. He was eventually employed by the conservative website Talon News during the latter part of this period. Gannon first gained national attention during a presidential press conference on January 26, 2005, when he asked United States President George W. Bush a question that some in the press corps considered "so friendly it might have been planted" ("How are you going to work with [Senate Democratic leaders] who seem to have divorced themselves from reality?").

Gannon routinely obtained daily passes to White House briefings, attending four Bush press conferences and appearing regularly at White House press briefings. Although he did not qualify for a Congressional press pass, Gannon was given daily passes to White House press briefings "after supplying his real name, date of birth and Social Security number." Gannon came under public scrutiny for his lack of a journalistic background prior to his work with Talon and his involvement with various gay escort service websites using the professional name "Bulldog."

Gannon resigned from Talon News on February 8, 2005. Continuing to use the name Gannon, he has since created his own official homepage and worked for a time as a columnist for the Washington Blade newspaper, where he confirmed he was gay after he was outed. Most recently, Gannon operated JeffGannon.com, a blog where he criticized those who exposed him, the "Old Media" and the "Angry Gay Left", accusing them of promoting a double standard. The site has since been taken offline and the domain expired. He published a book titled The Great Media War in 2007.

== Media career ==
=== White House press credentials ===
Gannon first attended a White House press conference on February 28, 2003, and there asked a question of then White House Press Secretary Ari Fleischer. At this time Gannon had never had an article published, and was not associated with any kind of news organization (Talon News had not yet been created). However, Gannon states that he was editor of his high school student newspaper, as proof of having some journalistic experience.

White House Press Secretary Scott McClellan later said that there had been no breakdown in security and no one had intervened on Gannon's behalf to ensure his access, despite the fact that he had been able to get a press pass for the White House using an assumed name. Gannon's response was that the alias Jeff Gannon was a professional name used for convenience, claiming that his "real last name is hard to spell and pronounce," and that the Secret Service was aware of his identity.

Journalists have said that it can take weeks to get the kind of clearance Gannon received. He was issued one-day press passes for nearly two years, avoiding the extensive background checks required for permanent passes, and sidestepping his inability to gain the necessary Congressional press pass. He applied for a Congressional press pass in April 2004 but was denied one by the Standing Committee of Correspondents, a group of congressional reporters who oversee press credential distribution on Capitol Hill, on the grounds that Talon did not qualify as a legitimate independent news service. On his resume Gannon said he is a graduate of the Leadership Institute Broadcast School of Journalism, a two-day seminar for "conservatives who want a career in journalism."

=== Talon News ===
Talon News was a virtual organization (with no physical office or newsroom) owned by the Web site GOPUSA. Robert Eberle is the president and CEO of both GOPUSA and Talon News. This led to charge that Talon News was created specifically to give Gannon a news organization that he could ostensibly represent, to justify his continuing to work at the White House. By the middle of February 2005, the Talon News website had shut down indefinitely, according to the message on that site; since May 2007, the Talon News site has been a parody, and its pages link to The Firesign Theatre's site.

=== Controversy ===
The controversy over Gannon's background started after President George W. Bush's January 26, 2005, press conference, at which Gannon asked the president the following question:

Senate Democratic leaders have painted a very bleak picture of the U.S. economy. (Senate Minority Leader) Harry Reid was talking about soup lines. And (Senator) Hillary Clinton was talking about the economy being on the verge of collapse. Yet in the same breath they say that Social Security is rock solid and there's no crisis there. How are you going to work – you've said you are going to reach out to these people – how are you going to work with people who seem to have divorced themselves from reality?

Gannon's question was ridiculed on The Daily Show with Jon Stewart enquiring, "Who is this muckraking Jeff Gannon, who is holding the president's feet to the fire so that he can more easily give him a reach-around?" The question was also derided by a number of bloggers who considered it an excessively deferential question for a reporter to ask at a presidential press conference. The question also contained a factually inaccurate assertion: the supposed comments about soup lines had not been made by Reid, but had been satirically attributed to him by conservative commentator Rush Limbaugh.

After the January 26, 2005, press conference, scrutiny into his personal and professional background by news organizations and blogs began. On February 8, 2005, Gannon resigned from Talon News and shut down his website, Jeffgannon.com. According to Howard Kurtz of the Washington Post:

Jeff Gannon, ... whose naked pictures have appeared on a number of gay escort sites, says that he has 'regrets' about his past but that White House officials knew nothing about his salacious activities.

Gannon said that he has been stalked and that his family has been harassed. He has revived his website since that time.

Gannon is alleged to have registered several Internet domain names, including hotmilitarystud.com and Militaryescorts4m.com and posted naked pictures of himself. According to The Independent:

Bloggers revealed that Jeff Gannon... had previously worked as a $200-an-hour gay prostitute who advertised himself on a series of websites with names such as hotmilitarystud.com.

When these ads became public, Gannon refused to specifically address them, but admitted that he had made mistakes in his past.

During the 2004 election, he wrote that John Kerry "might someday be known as 'the first gay president'" and that Kerry had supported "the pro-gay agenda."

Cliff Kincaid, editor of the conservative organization Accuracy in Media, wrote that "(t)he campaign against Gannon demonstrates the paranoid mentality and mean-spirited nature of the political left."

In April 2006, Gannon appeared on the television program Lie Detector, produced by Mark Phillips Philms and Telephision for the PAX Network (now Ion Television) submitting to and passing a polygraph test while asserting that he was not a White House operative.

=== Connection to Plame investigation ===
Gannon was questioned by the Justice Department in relation to the department's criminal investigation into the Valerie Plame affair, in which Plame's identity as an employee of the Central Intelligence Agency (CIA) was leaked to a journalist by an administration official. On October 28, 2003, Talon News published an interview in three parts that Gannon had conducted with Ambassador Joseph C. Wilson, Plame's husband, whom the CIA had sent to Niger in 2003 to investigate claims that Iraq was attempting to procure yellowcake uranium. In the interview, Gannon asked Wilson about an "internal government memo prepared by U.S. intelligence personnel" that said Plame had suggested Wilson for the job. In a February 2005 interview, Gannon told CNN's Wolf Blitzer that the Federal Bureau of Investigation (FBI) had spoken to him in an effort to learn who had leaked the classified memo and to whom, but that he had not been asked to appear before the grand jury investigating the case. Many assumed the White House had leaked the memo to him. Gannon said he had learned about its existence after it had been mentioned in a story published in the Wall Street Journal.

Previously, Gannon had been criticized by Tom Daschle's supporters when he covered the 2004 South Dakota Senate race between Daschle and John Thune. Supporters of Daschle claimed he acted as a de facto member of the Thune campaign while ostensibly a journalist.

=== Washington Blade ===
In July 2005, Gannon began writing for the DC-area gay publication Washington Blade. His articles included criticism of gay blogger John Aravosis, who had accused him of having pornographic ads. Blade editor Chris Crain attracted his own criticism from many in the gay community for this decision, due to Gannon's criticism of the gay rights movement as well as his refusal to disclose his sexual orientation. He has said, "My personal life is a private matter, despite the fact that I have become a public person." Crain defended his decision in a September 2005 editorial, writing that the "steady stream of feedback/vitriol" had declined "a little" with each new Gannon article. Crain resigned as editor in 2006, retaining ownership in the paper's parent company. The new editorial team fired Gannon as a result of what editor Kevin Naff called Gannon's "huge credibility problem."

== House Judiciary Committee ==
The House Judiciary Committee voted against House resolution 136, on March 16, 2005, that would have directed the Attorney General and the Secretary of Homeland Security to transmit documents in the possession of officials to the House of Representatives. These documents related to the security investigations and background checks involved in granting Gannon access to the White House. The documents were to be transmitted no later than 14 days after the date of the adoption of the resolution.

During the Committee meeting, Democratic Rep. Sheila Jackson Lee claimed that Gannon had engaged in "a penetration of the White House, maybe a security breach, and I do not believe it can be answered with self-investigation.

Chairman Jim Sensenbrenner said that a letter from the Secret Service dated March 7, 2005, stated, "Please be advised that our Office of Protective Operations has looked into this matter and has determined that there was no deviation from Secret Service standards and procedures as your letter suggests."

Gannon later wrote in his blog, "I hope this vote will put these issues to rest and allow me to return to my work as a journalist." In his self-published book, The Great Media War, he responds to questions about whether he played some role for the Bush White House other than that of an independent journalist.

== White House records ==
Democratic Representatives John Conyers of Michigan and Louise Slaughter of New York had submitted similar requests under the Freedom of Information Act (FOIA), on February 15, 2005. The Department of Homeland Security answered Slaughter's request with Secret Service records of Gannon's check in and out times at the White House. In a 2005 interview, he stated that he has never spent the night at the White House.

== See also ==
- List of topics related to public relations and propaganda
- List of federal political sex scandals in the United States
