= John Aravosis =

American blogger (born 1963)

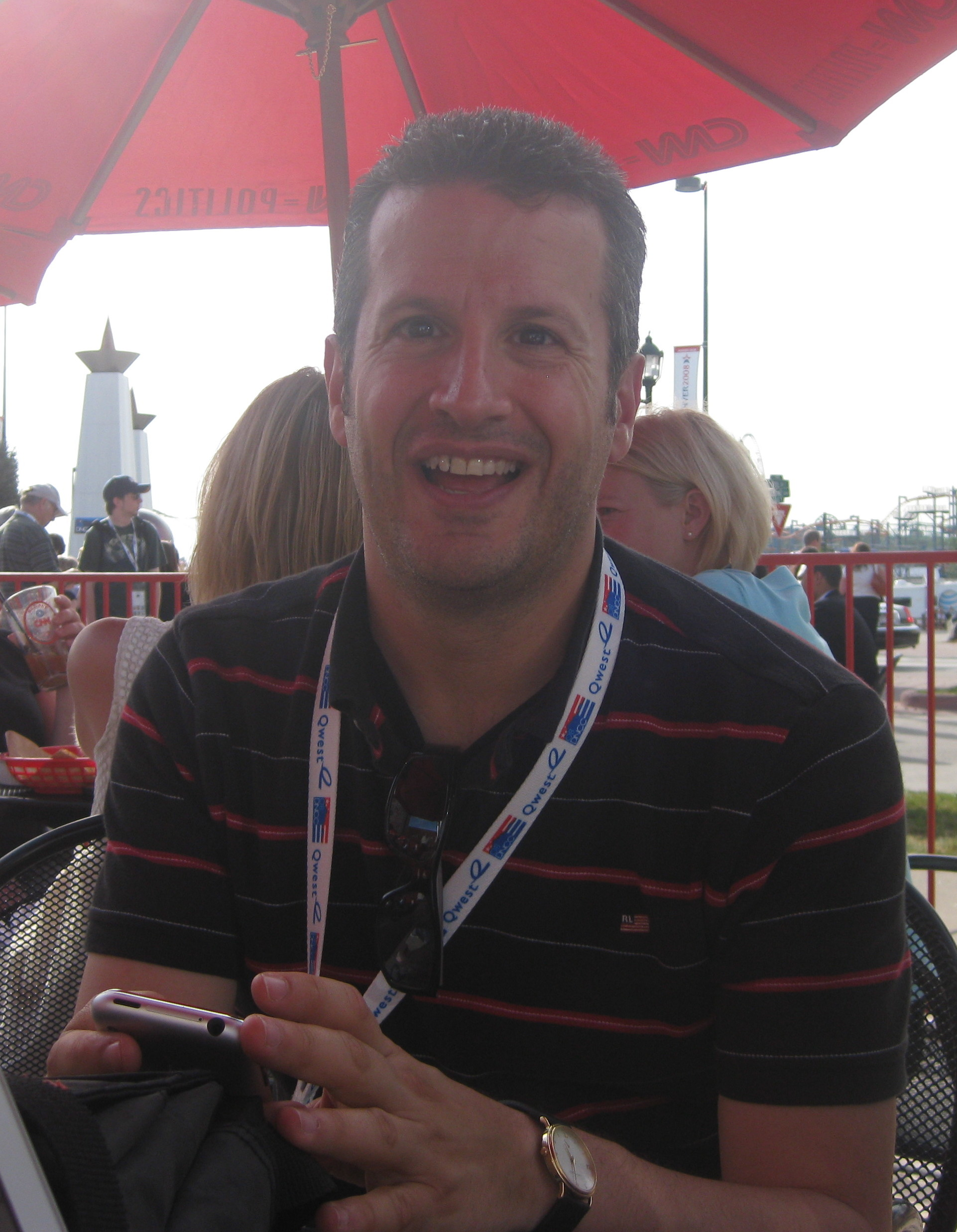
- John Aravosis in August 2008
- Born: November 27, 1963 (age 62); United States
- Education: University of Illinois at Urbana-Champaign; Georgetown University (JD)
- Occupation: Lawyer
- Known for: americablog.com

John Aravosis (born November 27, 1963) is an American and Greek Democratic political consultant, journalist, civil rights advocate, and blogger. Aravosis, an attorney who lives in Washington D.C., is the founder and executive editor of AMERICAblog and The Aravosis Report.

== Early life and education ==
Aravosis grew up in what he describes as an "upper-middle-class" environment in the suburbs of Chicago. He received his undergraduate degree in rhetoric from the University of Illinois at Urbana-Champaign, and received a joint J.D. degree and master's degree in foreign service from Georgetown, where he studied under former Secretary of State Madeleine Albright. He also has a Diplôme Supérieur from the Cours de Civilisation Française of the Sorbonne, in Paris, France.

== Career ==
Aravosis worked on Capitol Hill in the late 1980s and early 1990s as a foreign policy adviser for Ted Stevens, a Republican senator from Alaska, before becoming a Democrat. He subsequently worked at the World Bank, the Children's Defense Fund, as the US Politics editor at About.com, and as a stringer for The Economist. In 1997, Aravosis started his own political Internet consulting business. He now works full time as the host and creator of The Aravosis Report, a nightly social media news show on TikTok and YouTube about US politics in general, and the war in Ukraine in particular. He has a speciality in using the Internet for political advocacy and international development that has brought him to Europe, Latin America, Africa, and Asia.

== AMERICAblog ==
In 2004, Aravosis launched AMERICAblog, a progressive news blog dealing in politics (because, according to its masthead, "a great nation deserves the truth"). In March 2015, Aravosis announced that he was leaving blogging, taking a new job at the United Nations Development Programme (UNDP), and relinquishing his role at AMERICAblog. In 2016, Aravosis returned to his role as executive editor of AMERICAblog.

== The Aravosis Report ==
In March 2022, Aravosis began The Aravosis Report, a nightly social media news show devoted to US politics and the war in Ukraine. He also launched a Discord community.

=== Ranking ===
A study of blogs and the 2004 U.S. Presidential Election ranked AMERICAblog as the 18th most popular liberal blog for October–November 2004. In 2005, less than one year after its launch, AMERICAblog was ranked fifth in page views among all political blogs in an analysis done by MyDD. In 2008, PC Magazine ranked AMERICAblog as one of the "20 best political Web sites". At the time, PC Magazine wrote: "You'll want to keep AMERICAblog on your radar." In 2009, AMERICAblog was ranked as one of the top ten political blogs by the Personal Democracy Forum, and as the 23rd most popular political blog by Wikio. In 2010, Technorati ranked AMERICAblog in the top 100 political blogs and top 100 US politics blogs, and in 2013 Pingdom cited AMERICAblog as one of the top 100 blogs. The New York Times includes AMERICAblog among 17 "politics & government" blogs that it recommends. Rolling Stone once wrote of AMERICAblog: "We trust you are all reading AMERICAblog ... you'll be better Amurricans for it."

=== Notable coverage ===
In 2006, Aravosis learned that a number of commercial websites were selling people's private cell phone records, and that the practice was legal. To publicize what he considered a problem, Aravosis purchased the call records of former presidential candidate and Supreme Allied Commander of NATO General Wesley Clark for $89.95, and then published the records (with the numbers blacked out) on AMERICAblog, bringing the issue widespread attention. In September 2006, California passed a state law banning the practice of pretexting, or pretending to be someone else, used by the websites, with the bill's sponsor specifically citing the AMERICAblog coverage. Clark became an advocate of cell record privacy bills in Congress. Within months, Congress passed a law restricting these records.

In 2011, Aravosis received a tip that British oil giant BP (British Petroleum) was posting falsified photos to its website during the Deepwater Horizon oil spill. He analyzed the photos, then published an article on AMERICAblog proving that the images were doctored electronically. The story received widespread coverage in the media.

== Television appearances ==
In 2005, Aravosis began hosting his own Internet television show, DemsTV. As of February 2006, DemsTV became PoliticsTV, restructured its programming, and added many specials.

Aravosis was a sometime TV pundit, having appeared on CNN's Reliable Sources and Larry King Live, ABC's World News Tonight and Nightline, MSNBC's Hardball, and Fox News' The O'Reilly Factor, among others.

== Personal life ==
Aravosis is a first-generation Greek-American, and has written about the influence his Greek heritage has had on his political work. Aravosis' uncle Yiannis Haralambopoulos was imprisoned and beaten by Greece's military junta in the early 1970s. In the decade after Greece's return to democracy, Haralambopoulos became, at various times, the country's Deputy Prime Minister, Defense Minister and Foreign Minister under the government of Andreas Papandreou. A mutual ancestor of Aravosis and Haralambopoulos, Dimitris Papatsoris, was one of the regional leaders in the south for the Greek war of independence. On May 11, 2026, Aravosis announced that he had become a Greek citizen; his mother and all four grandparents were born in Greece.

In addition to English, Aravosis speaks French, Spanish, Italian, and Greek. He is openly gay and has written frequently on gay rights.
