= 2004 Baghdad refusal of orders =

Disciplinary incident during the Iraq War

On October 13, 2004, American Army reservists participating in the Iraq War refused an order to drive a convoy of fuel tanker due to the fuel being contaminated. The Army claimed that the reason for their refusal was due to the poor conditions of the vehicles. Although the vehicles were old and lacked armor, the Soldiers involved stated that their refusal was due to the fuel contamination. They felt that supplying contaminated fuel to aviation units would have put their fellow soldiers at risk and that this was not something they were willing to do. They brought this to the attention of their leadership and their concern was ignored. They felt they had no other choice but to refuse the mission and face disciplinary action. This was an outcome they were willing to face in order to not put their fellow soldiers in harms way. Their actions led to claims that their actions constituted a "mutiny". The Army continued with the narrative that the Soldiers were concerned about the condition of their vehicles.

The 343rd Quartermaster Company, based in Rock Hill, South Carolina, had earlier been forced to turn back from an abortive 3.5 day journey to another army base which had refused their load of contaminated fuel.

Returning to Tallil Air Base, the same company was ordered to take their cargo to Taji, north of Baghdad. The journey would be through dangerous terrain known for ambushes by Iraqi insurgents and would be made without the usual infantry and helicopter escort.

== Fallout ==
Of the 19 soldiers who refused the order, 18 were placed under investigation. In the end, the army decided not to pursue a court-martial against the soldiers, but rather to seek non-judicial punishments against five of them. Five soldiers were reassigned to different units.

The Army ordered the 120-troop company put on stand down, and taken off active duty while their vehicles were repaired and upgraded with steel armor plates. They returned to active status on November 11.

On October 21, the Army announced that they had replaced the commander of the unit at her own request. The first sergeant was also replaced as a result of the action.
