= Hadi Alwai =

Iraqi historian and linguist (1932–1998)

- هادي العلوي
- Born: 1932; Baghdad
- Died: 27 September 1998 (aged 65–66); Damascus
- Education: Baghdad University

Hadi Alwai (Arabic: هادي العلوي; 1932 – 27 September 1998) was an Iraqi Marxist scholar, Islamic historian, and Arab linguist.

Alawi's research covers topics of Islam and Chinese philosophy. He wrote books and research papers on Islam, Chinese history, and languages.

== Early life ==
Alawi left Iraq and travelled to China, then moved to Syria, where he lived in exile until he died and was buried in Damascus in 1998.

Hadi Alwai was born in Baghdad in 1932 or 1933. He lived in Karada Maryam a rural suburb of Baghdad in poverty. His father was an uneducated worker. His grandfather Salman, a religious scholar, died when Hadi was five.

Alwai's education began at age 14 when he discovered his deceased grandfather's neglected library. He memorized the Qur'an and Nahj al-Balagha alongside works of Arabic poetry. He finished high school in 1950 and graduated from the College of Commerce and Economics at Baghdad University in 1956.

He participated in the Iraqi national movement starting in the 1950s. He then became a Marxist. He established a close relationship with the communist movement. In 1976, he was forced to leave Iraq, causing him to move between China, Britain, Lebanon, and Syria.

Al-Alwai died in Al-Shami Hospital in Damascus in September 1998 and was buried there.

== Beliefs ==
The first research about him was published in 1960 in Al-Muthaqaf magazine. Alwai was interested in the modern Arab and Islamic scientific renaissance. He considered that the first Arab renaissance began with Sadr al-Din al-Shirazi and not with the French campaign against Egypt.

Alwai was notable among his contemporaries for his ideas about the East and his knowledge related to Islamic and Chinese civilization as well as his knowledge of the Latin, Hebrew, Aramaic, and Chinese languages.

He sought complete impartiality, impersonality, and unlimited intellect, until he was called the cosmic intellectual. Alwai was also associated with Sufi, with his tendencies, behavior, and contributions to the heritage of Eastern Sufism. "In this context, (he) does not glorify the East nor preserve its religious and mythological taboos. Rather, he interprets them and searches for human destinies through his relational systems and various environments."

Alwai considered Islamic history to be a system of progression of stages with internal dynamics along economic, social, political, and cultural axes. He denied any theological cognitive break between Jahiliyya and Islam. Rather, transformative knowledge led to changing the mechanism of relationships and their closed institutions by turning them into a new totalitarian system.

Alwai researched a linguistic project, of which only three dictionaries were completed. The dictionaries were a new form of the Arabic language, combining spoken and classical dialects, to bring the common and written levels closer to scholarly knowledge and culture. He took steps to break the academic rules of language by introducing spoken vocabulary and synonyms versus classical in his writings and research without converging into sukuniya and its conservative laws.

== See also ==
- Idiomatic

== Works ==
- "In Islamic Politics", (original text: fi alsiyasat al'iislamia) 1974
- "From the History of Torture in Islam", (original text: min tarikh altaedhib fi al'Islam) 1986
- "Political Assassination in Islam", (original text: alaightial alsiyasi fi al'Islam) 1988
- "Chapters from the History of Political Islam," (original text: fsul min tarikh al'Islam alsiyasii) he compiled three of his books into one volume, 1999
- "The Visible and the Invisible in Literature and Politics," (original text: almaryiy walllamariiy fi al'adab walsiyasa) a collection of articles and studies, 1998
- "Sufi Orbits", (original text: madarat sufia) The Legacy of the Communal Revolution in the East, 1997
- "Chapters on Women", (original text: fusul ean almar'a) 1996
- "Non-anxious personalities in Islam", (original text: shakhsiat ghyr qaliqa fi al'Islam) 1995
- "The New Subversive", (original text: almustatraf aljadid) 1980
- "The Book of the Tao", (original text: kitab alttaw) Laotze, translation and study, 1995
- "The Contemporary Arabic Dictionary", (original text: almaejam alearabiu almueasir) of which two parts were published, the first of which was "The Dictionary of Human and Society" (original text: qamus al'iinsan walmujtamae) in 1997, and the second was "The Dictionary of State and Economics." (original text: qamus aldawla walaiqtisad)
