= Walid Hassan (comedian) =

Iraqi comedian

Walid Hassan (born c. 1959 - d. 20 November 2006) was a Shia Muslim Iraqi comedian. At the time of his death he was one of five actors on Caricature, a 45-minute comedy satire on Al-Sharqiyah TV, that did not hesitate to make fun of U.S. forces, Shiite militias, Sunni-Arab insurgent groups, and the chaotic governments that have tried to rule Iraq since Saddam Hussein was overthrown in the 2003 invasion.

His TV show provided hard-pressed Iraqis with comic relief by poking fun at everything from politicians to long lines at fuel stations.

He was shot to death while driving through Baghdad on 20 November 2006. As with many other killings in Baghdad, the identity of the gunmen who shot Hassan was not known, police said.

He was buried on 21 November 2006 after his coffin was tied to the top of a taxi for the 160 km (99 mi) journey from Baghdad to the Shia holy city of Najaf.
