= Baqir Jabr al-Zubeidi =

Iraqi politician

- باقر جبر الزبيدي
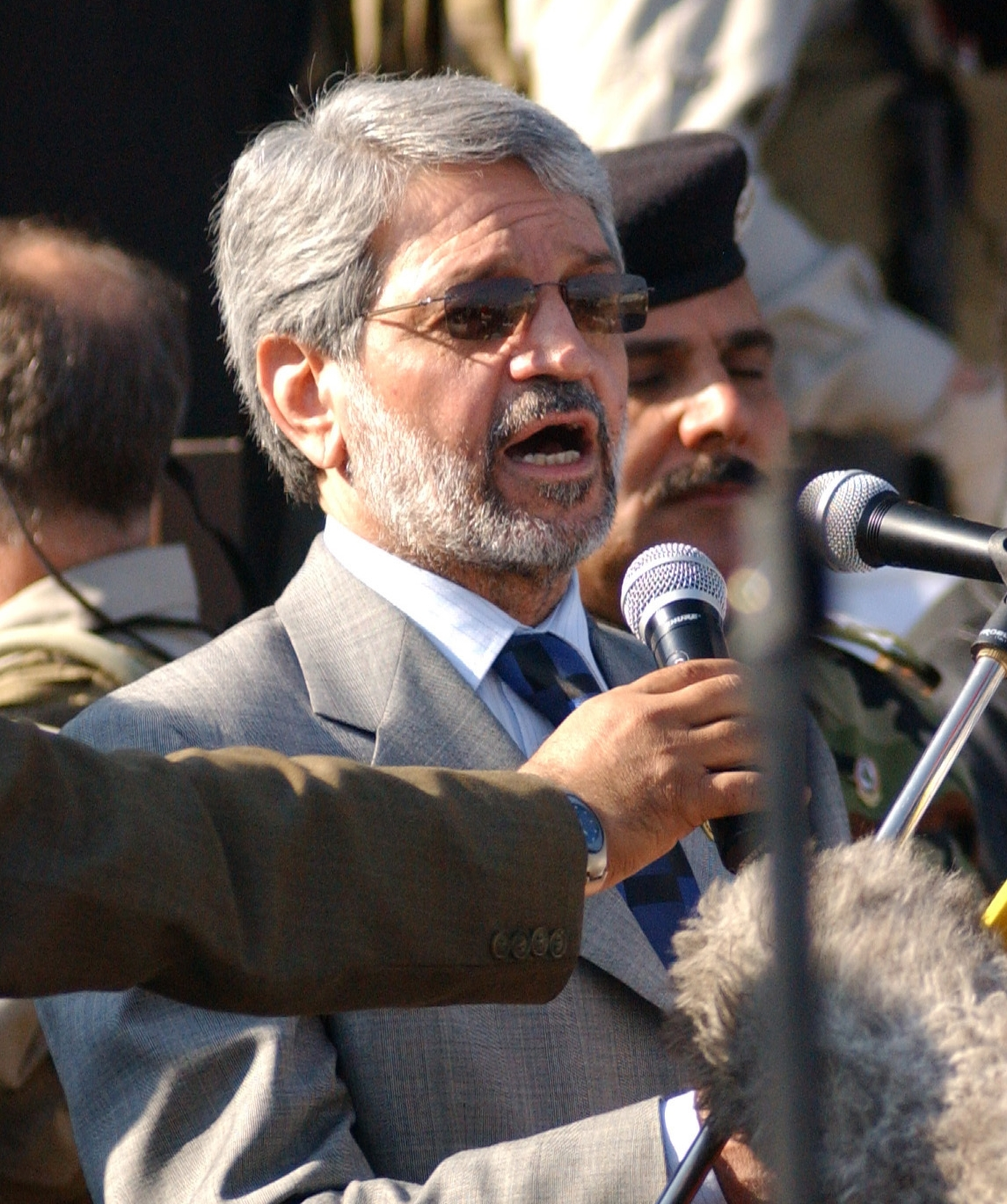
- Baqr Al-Zubeidi in 2006.

Minister of Transport
- In office September 2014 – August 2016
- President: Fuad Masum
- Prime Minister: Haider Al-Abadi
- Preceded by: Hadi Al-Amiri
- Succeeded by: Kazim Finjan Al Hamami

Minister of Finance
- In office May 2006 – December 2010
- President: Jalal Talabani
- Prime Minister: Nouri al-Maliki
- Preceded by: Ali Abdul-Amir Allawi
- Succeeded by: Rafi al-Issawi

Minister of Interior
- In office April 2005 – May 2006
- President: Jalal Talabani
- Prime Minister: Ibrahim al-Jaafari
- Preceded by: Falah Hassan al-Naqib
- Succeeded by: Jawad Bulani

Minister of Housing and Reconstruction
- In office September 2003 – June 2004
- President: Ghazi Mashal Ajil al-Yawer
- Prime Minister: Iraqi Governing Council
- Preceded by: Coalition Provisional Authority
- Succeeded by: Omar Farouk

Personal details
- Born: 1946 (age 79–80) Amara Province, Kingdom of Iraq
- Party: Islamic Supreme Council of Iraq
- Education: University of Basra
- Occupation: Politician
- Nickname: Bayan Jabr Solagh

Military service
- Allegiance: Badr Brigades
- Commands: Commander of the Badr Brigades

Baqir Jabr Al-Zubeidi (Arabic: باقر جبر الزبيدي, romanized: Bāqir Jarb al-Zabīdī; born 1946), also known as Bayan Jabr Solagh (Arabic: بيان باقر صولاغ, romanized: Bayān Bāqir Sūlāġ), is an Iraqi politician and former commander of the Badr Brigades who served as the Finance Minister of Iraq in the government of Nouri al-Maliki. He served as Minister of Interior, in charge of the police, in the Iraqi Transitional Government and was Minister of Housing and Reconstruction of the Iraqi Governing Council. He is also a senior member of the Shi'a United Iraqi Alliance as well as a leader in the Supreme Council for the Islamic Revolution in Iraq (SCIRI).

Born in 1946 to a Shia family in the Maysan Governorate, Jabr became a Shi'a activist while studying engineering at Baghdad University in the 1970s. He escaped to Iran amid former Iraqi President Saddam Hussein's crackdown on Shi'a political groups and joined the Supreme Council for the Islamic Revolution in Iraq (SCIRI). He later headed SCIRI's office in Syria. According to the Independent newspaper Jabr was a former commander of SCIRI's militia, the Badr Brigades.

On 3 January 2006, his sister was reported kidnapped from Baghdad by Iraqi insurgents. Parts of central Baghdad were locked down as police searched for the woman. She was released two weeks later after a ransom was paid by him.

Political offices
Preceded by Ali Abdul-Amir Allawi	Minister of Finance of Iraq; May 2006–December 2010	Succeeded by Rafi al-Issawi
Preceded by Falah Hassan al-Naqib	Minister of Interior of Iraq; April 2005–May 2006	Succeeded by Jawad Bulani
Preceded by Coalition Provisional Authority	Minister of Housing and Reconstruction of Iraq; September 2003–June 2004	Succeeded by Omar Farouk
