= Iraq and the United Nations =

Republic of Iraq

United Nations membership
- Represented by: Hashemite Kingdom of Iraq (1945–1958); Iraqi Republic (1958–1968); Ba'athist Iraq (1968–2003); Coalition Provisional Authority (2003–2004); Republic of Iraq (2004–present)
- Membership: Full member
- Since: 21 December 1945
- Former name(s): Hashemite Kingdom of Iraq (1945–1958); Iraqi Republic (1958–1992)
- UNSC seat: Non-permanent
- Permanent Representative: Mohamed Ali Alhakim

Iraq was one of the founding members of the United Nations since 21 December 1945 as the Kingdom of Iraq. It signed the Declaration by United Nations in 1943. As a member of the UN, Iraq held a seat as a non-permanent member in the Security Council between 1957-1958 and 1974–1975.

== See also ==
- Foreign relations of Iraq
