= Mohammad Bahr al-Uloom =

Prime minister of Iraq in 2003

Ayatollah Sayyid Mohammad Bahraluloom
- محمد بحر العلوم

President of the Governing Council of Iraq
- In office 1 March 2004 – 31 March 2004
- Preceded by: Mohsen Abdel Hamid
- Succeeded by: Massoud Barzani
- In office 13 July 2003 – 31 July 2003
- Preceded by: Saddam Hussein (President & Prime Minister)
- Succeeded by: Ibrahim al-Jaafari

Personal details
- Born: 17 December 1927 Najaf, Iraq
- Died: 7 April 2015 (aged 87) Najaf, Iraq
- Party: National Iraqi Alliance
- Title: Grand Ayatollah

Personal life
- Education: Najaf Seminary; Cairo University
- Relatives: Razi Shirazi (brother-in-law)

Religious life
- Religion: Islam
- Denomination: Twelver Shīʿā
- Jurisprudence: Usuli

Ayatollah Sayyid Mohammad Bahr al-Uloom (Arabic: محمد بحر العلوم, romanized: Muḥammad Baḥr al-ʿUlūm; 17 December 1927 – 7 April 2015) was an Iraqi political figure and Twelver Shi'a Islamic leader who served as the President of the Governing Council of Iraq (43rd Prime Minister of Iraq).

== Biography ==
Bahr al-Uloom was born in Najaf in 1927 to Ali Bahr al-Uloom. He grew up and studied in Najaf, under his father, as well as other notable scholars of the religious seminary of Najaf.

He was a long time opponent of the rule of Saddam Hussein. By 1992, he had moved to London where he opposed Saddam's rule for many years. He was an active member of London's Shi'a community and was the head of AhlulBayt Centre in South London. In November 1992, at the Salahuddin gathering, within the safety of the southern air exclusion zone, along with Masoud Barzani and Colonel Hassan al-Naqib, he was one of the three men to be appointed to the presidential council by the Iraqi National Congress. Mohammad Bahr al-Uloom continued to live in London prior to the 2003 Iraq invasion.

After the United States deposed Saddam Hussein in 2003, as part of Operation Iraqi Freedom, Bahr al-Uloom was appointed to the Iraq interim governing council. He agreed to participate in the interim government and was appointed to the nine-member rotating presidency. He was the first president of the council, in an interim capacity, serving in that position from 13 July 2003 until 1 August 2003.

In August 2003, Mohammed Baqir al-Hakim, a friend of Bahr al-Uloom, was killed in a car bombing. Shortly after, Bahr al-Uloom announced his voluntary suspension from the council, citing the failure of the council's ability to maintain law and order in post-war Iraq. He later returned to the council, and became president again on 1 March 2004, serving until 1 April 2004.

== Personal life ==
Bahr al-Uloom was married to the great-granddaughter of Mirza Shirazi. They had four daughters and three sons. His son, Ibrahim, was the Oil Minister of Iraq from September 2003 to June 2004, and again during 2005. His son, Muhammad-Husayn, served as the Ambassador of Iraq to the United Nations in the years 2018-2022.

== Death ==
Bahr al-Uloom died in 2015 from kidney disease.

Political offices
Preceded by Saddam Hussein as Prime Minister of Iraq	President of the Governing Council of Iraq; Acting; 2003	Succeeded by Ibrahim al-Jaafari
Preceded by Mohsen Abdel Hamid	President of the Governing Council of Iraq; 2004	Succeeded by Masoud Barzani
