= Iraqi Governing Council =

2003–2004 provisional government of Iraq

Iraqi Governing Council مجلس الحكم العراقي

Type
- Type: Unicameral

History
- Founded: 13 July 2003; 23 years ago
- Disbanded: 1 June 2004; 22 years ago
- Preceded by: Revolutionary Command Council
- Succeeded by: Council of Representatives of Iraq

Leadership
- President: Mohammad Bahr al-Uloom (first) Ghazi Mashal Ajil al-Yawer (last)

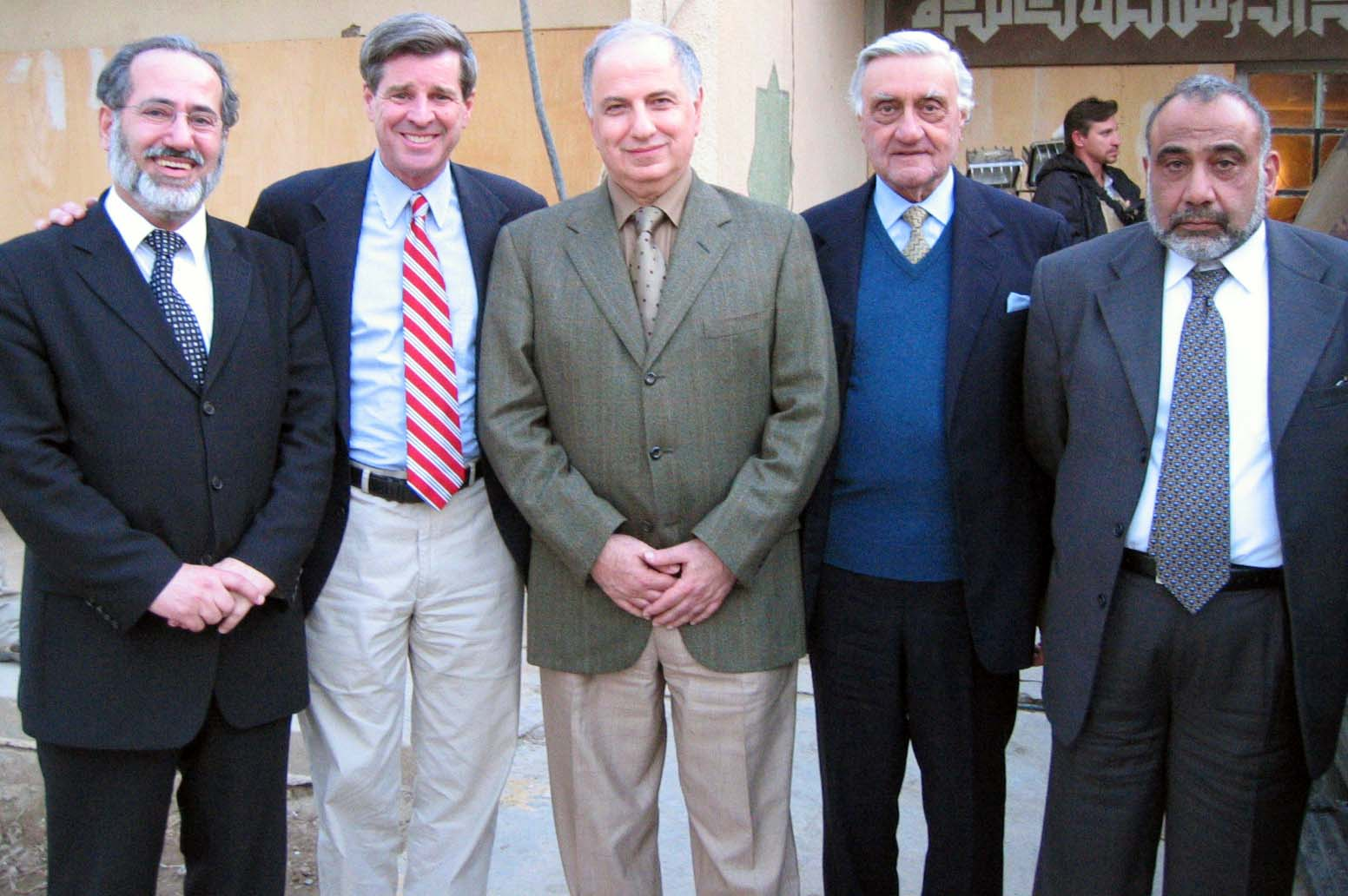
Paul Bremer (second from left) with some members of the Iraqi Governing Council

The Iraqi Governing Council (IGC) was the provisional government of Iraq from 13 July 2003 to 1 June 2004. It was established by and served under the United States-led Coalition Provisional Authority (CPA). The IGC consisted of various Iraqi political and tribal leaders who were appointed by the CPA to provide advice and leadership of the country until the June 2004 transfer of sovereignty to the Iraqi Interim Government (which was replaced in May 2005 by the Iraqi Transitional Government, which was then replaced the following year by the first permanent government).

The Council consisted of 25 members. Its ethnic and religious breakdown included 13 Shias, five Sunnis, five Kurds (also Sunnis), one Turkmen and an Assyrian. Three of its members were women.

In September 2003, the Iraqi Governing Council gained regional recognition from the Arab League, which agreed to seat its representative in Iraq's chair at its meetings. On 1 June 2004, the Council dissolved after choosing member Ghazi Mashal Ajil al-Yawer as the president of the new Iraq interim government. Full sovereignty was transferred to the interim government (and the CPA dissolved) on 28 June.

== General information ==
Though subject to the authority of the CPA administrator Paul Bremer, the council had several key powers of its own. Their duties included appointing representatives to the United Nations, appointing interim ministers to Iraq's vacant cabinet positions, and drafting a temporary constitution, the Transitional Administrative Law (TAL). The TAL spelled out the provisions which were to govern the Iraqi Interim Government, and the timeline for holding elections to a National Assembly, drafting of a permanent constitution to be voted on by the Iraqi people, and elections to a permanent government.

Despite having to answer to the CPA, different factions took on controversial stands. Religious hardliners won a solid victory when Directive 137 was passed on 29 December 2003. Passed by the council in less than 15 minutes, it replaced Iraq's former secular family law code with Shari'a family law. This move met with wide protest among many Iraqi women fearful of how it will affect their freedom to make their own decisions about marriage, alimony, and many other issues where Iraq used to be a leader in the Arab world for women's rights. Other legislation passed by the council included declaring the day that Baghdad fell to be a national holiday, voting to establish a tribunal to try former government leaders, and banning television stations which are deemed to be supportive of the resistance. A new flag chosen by the council for post-Saddam Iraq created much controversy, in part because of the similarity of color and design with the flag of Israel, and the flag was not adopted.

According to the Law of Administration for the State of Iraq for the Transitional Period, the interim constitution that the Council approved, the council would cease to function after 30 June 2004, at which point full sovereignty would return to Iraq, and the government will be handed over to a new, sovereign interim government. Instead, the council chose to dissolve itself prematurely.

== Presidents of the Iraqi Governing Council ==
Name	Took office	Left office	Political party
Mohammed Bahr al-Uloum (1st time, acting)	13 July 2003	31 July 2003	Independent
Ibrahim al-Jaafari	1 August 2003	31 August 2003	Islamic Dawa Party
Ahmed Chalabi	1 September 2003	30 September 2003	Iraqi National Congress
Iyad Allawi	1 October 2003	31 October 2003	Iraqi National Accord
Jalal Talabani	1 November 2003	30 November 2003	Patriotic Union of Kurdistan
Abdel-Aziz al-Hakim	1 December 2003	31 December 2003	Supreme Council for the Islamic Revolution in Iraq
Adnan Pachachi	1 January 2004	31 January 2004	Assembly of Independent Democrats
Mohsen Abdel Hamid	1 February 2004	29 February 2004	Iraqi Islamic Party
Mohammed Bahr al-Uloum (2nd time)	1 March 2004	31 March 2004	Independent
Massoud Barzani	1 April 2004	30 April 2004	Kurdistan Democratic Party
Ezzedine Salim	1 May 2004	17 May 2004	Islamic Dawa Party
Ghazi Mashal Ajil al-Yawer	17 May 2004	1 June 2004	Independent

== Council Members ==
Name	Political Party	Religion & Ethnicity
Samir Shakir Mahmoud Sumaidaie	Independent	Arab
Sondul Chapouk ♀	Independent	Turkmen
Wael Abdul Latif	Independent	Shiite Arab
Mowaffak al-Rubaie	Independent	Shiite Arab
Dara Nur al-Din	Independent	Sunni Kurd
Ahmed al-Barak	Independent	Shiite Arab
Raja Habib al-Khuzaai ♀	Independent	Shiite Arab
Mohammad Bahr al-Uloum (p)	Independent	Shiite Arab
Aqila al-Hashimi ♀ (Died following assassination attack on 25 September 2003); Replaced by Salama al-Khufaji ♀ on 8 December	Independent (Ba'ath party pre-2003)	Shiite Arab
Ahmed Chalabi (p)	Iraqi National Congress	Shiite Arab
Naseer al-Chaderchi	National Democratic Party	Sunni Arab
Adnan Pachachi (p)	Assembly of Independent Democrats	Sunni Arab
Massoud Barzani (p)	Kurdistan Democratic Party	Sunni Kurd
Jalal Talabani (p) – first President of Iraq	Patriotic Union of Kurdistan	Sunni Kurd
Abdel-Aziz al-Hakim (p)	SCIRI	Shiite Arab
Yonadam Kanna	Assyrian Democratic Movement	Assyrian Christian
Salaheddine Bahaaeddin	Kurdistan Islamic Union	Sunni Kurd
Mahmoud Othman	KSDP	Sunni Kurd
Hamid Majid Mousa	Iraqi Communist Party	Shiite Arab
Ghazi Mashal Ajil al-Yawer (p) (Final council president, served as interim President of Iraq)	Independent	Sunni Arab
Mohsen Abdel Hamid (p)	Iraqi Islamic Party	Sunni Arab
Iyad Allawi (p) (Served as first interim Prime Minister of Iraq)	Iraqi National Accord	Shiite Arab
Abdel-Karim Mahoud al-Mohammedawi	Iraqi Hezbollah	Shiite Arab
Ibrahim al-Jaafari (p) (Served as second interim Prime Minister of Iraq)	Islamic Dawa Party	Shiite Arab
Ezzedine Salim (p) (died in car bomb on 17 May 2004)	Islamic Dawa Party	Shiite Arab

The Presidency of the council rotated monthly among eleven of its members. A (p) marks those members above.

== Cabinet ==
On 1 September 2003, the council named its first cabinet.

- Minister of Communications – Haider al-Abadi
- Minister of Public Works – Nisrin Barwari
- Minister of Construction and Housing – Baqir Jabr al-Zubeidi
- Minister of the Environment – Abderrahman Sadik Karim
- Minister of Trade – Ali Allawi
- Minister of Planning – Mahdi al-Hafez
- Minister of Education – Alaa Abdessaheb al-Alwan
- Minister of Higher Education – Ziad Abderrazzak Mohammad Aswad
- Minister of Culture – Mufid Mohammad Jawad al-Jazairi
- Minister of Human Rights – Abdel Basset Turki (resigned April 2004)
- Minister of Foreign Affairs – Hoshyar Zebari
- Minister of Interior – Nuri Badran (resigned April 2004 and replaced by Samir Sumaidaie)
- Minister of Agriculture – Abdel Amir Abbud Rahima
- Minister of Sport and Youth – Ali Faik al-Ghabban
- Minister of Health – Dr. Khodayyir Abbas
- Minister of Industry and Minerals – Mohammad Tofiq Rahim
- Minister of Justice – Hashim Abderrahman al-Shibli
- Minister of Science and Technology – Rashad Mandan Omar
- Minister of Work and Social Affairs – Sami Azara al-Majun
- Minister of Electricity – Aiham Alsammarae
- Minister of Finance – Kamel al-Kilani
- Minister of Immigration and Refugees – Mohammad Jassem Khodayyir
- Minister of Water Resources – Latif Rashid
- Minister of Oil – Ibrahim Mohammad Bahr al-Ulloum
- Minister of Transport – Bahnam Zaya Bulos

The Saddam-era positions of Minister of Defense and Minister of Information were dissolved.

Preceded by Ba'athist Iraq	Government of Iraq; 13 July 2003 – 1 June 2004; With: Coalition Provisional Authority	Succeeded by Iraqi Interim Government
