= Aref Tayfour =

Iraqi politician

- عارف طيفور

Deputy Speaker of the Iraqi National Assembly
- In office 22 April 2006 – 2014
- President: Jalal Talabani
- Prime Minister: Nouri al-Maliki
- Preceded by: Position established
- Succeeded by: Aram Sheikh Mohammad
- Parliamentary group: Kurdistan Democratic Party

Deputy President of the National Assembly (Iraqi Transitional Government)
- In office 2004–2005
- President: Ghazi al-Yawar
- Prime Minister: Ayad Allawi
- Parliamentary group: Kurdistan Democratic Party

Personal details
- Born: 1945 (age 80–81) Dokan, As Sulaymaniyah Governorate, Iraqi Kurdistan
- Party: Kurdistan Democratic Party
- Other political affiliations: Hiywa (until 1967)
- Education: University of Baghdad (LLB)
- Occupation: Politician
- Profession: Lawyer

Aref Tayfour is the former Deputy Speaker of the Iraqi National Assembly from 2010 to 2014. He was succeeded by Aram Sheikh Mohammad from the Gorran Movement. A member of the Kurdistan Democratic Party, he was elected to the post by the Assembly on 22 April 2006 and after new legislative elections in 2010 he was re-elected to the post in November 2010. He also served as the Deputy President of the National Assembly under the Iraqi Transitional Government.

Tayfour was born in Dokan, As Sulaymaniyah Governorate, Iraqi Kurdistan in 1945. He graduated in law from Baghdad University in 1970. He originally joined the Hiywa Kurdish party before joining the KDP in 1967. He fled to Iran in 1974 and then to Austria. He returned to Iraqi Kurdistan in 1991. In 2003 he returned to Baghdad to lead the KDP's branch.
