= Suhaylah Abd-Jaafar =

Iraqi lawyer and human rights activist (born 1964)

- سهيلة عبد جعفر
- Born: 1964 (age 61–62); Baghdad, Iraq
- Other names: Suhaila Abd-Jaafar; Suhayla Abd-Jaafar
- Education: University of Baghdad
- Occupations: Lawyer; Human rights activist Minister of displacement and migration (2005-2006)

Suhaylah Abd-Jaafar (Arabic:سهيلة عبد جعفر ;born 1964) is an Iraqi lawyer and human rights activist. She was appointed Minister of displacement and migration in Ibrahim al Jaafari's Iraqi Transitional Government (2005–06). She survived a car bomb attack in February 2006. Variations of her name include Suhaila Abd-Jaafar and Suhayla Abd-Jaafar.

== Early life ==
Abd-Jaafar belongs to one of Shi'ite Feyli Kurds tribes. She was born in Baghdad in 1964 and attended the University of Baghdad, from where she received her two degrees in Law and Politics in 1987.

== Career ==
After finishing her education, Abd-Jaafar pursued a career in law and was also involved in human rights activities. As a lawyer, she has worked for both the Iraqi government and private clients. In May 2005, she was appointed the cabinet minister for displacement and migration in the Iraqi Transitional Government under the prime ministership of Ibrahim al Jaafari. She was succeeded by Abdul Samad Rahman Sultan, another Feyli Kurd.

In February 2006, while moving through eastern Baghdad, Abd-Jaafar's convoy struck a roadside bomb and three of her bodyguards were injured in the resulting explosion.
