= Djiboutian passport =

Passport issued to citizens of Djibouti

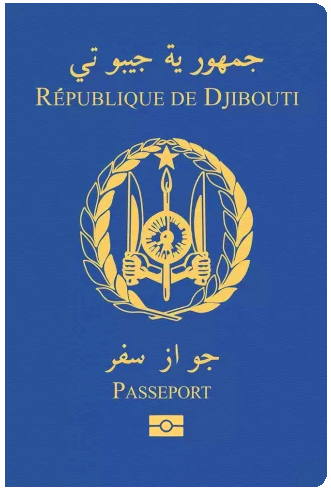
- Front cover of the current Djiboutian passport (with chip), issued since 2017
- Type: Passport
- Issued by: Djibouti
- First issued: 2 February 2017 (biometric passport)
- Purpose: Identification
- Eligibility: Djiboutian citizenship

The Djiboutian passport is issued to citizens of Djibouti for international travel. The document is a biometric machine-readable passport with a blue cover with the text "République de Djibouti" above the coat of arms, and the text "passport" below it in Arabic and French. The passport is valid for 5 years and contains 31 pages. The passport includes the full name, photograph, signature and date of birth of the holder. The newer passports offer better security and state-of-the-art anti forging parameters and have a soft cover.

Since 2 February 2017, biometric passports were issued according to the law.

== Issuing Requirements ==
Djiboutian passports are usually issued to Djiboutian citizens for a period of five years. To apply for a passport, either a Djiboutian National ID card is required, or a computerized birth certificate for those below the age of 18.

=== Identity Information Pages ===
Djiboutian Passport Information appears on the hard cover, and includes the data as shown in the following order

- Photo of Passport Holder
- Type [of document, which is "P" for "passport"]
- Code [of the issuing country, which is "DJI" for "Republic of Djibouti"]
- Passport No.
- Full Name
- Date of Birth
- Place of Birth
- Nationality
- Sex
- Date of Issue
- Date of Expiry
- Issuing Office
- Machine Readable Zone
- No Signature Is Required

== Visa free travel ==
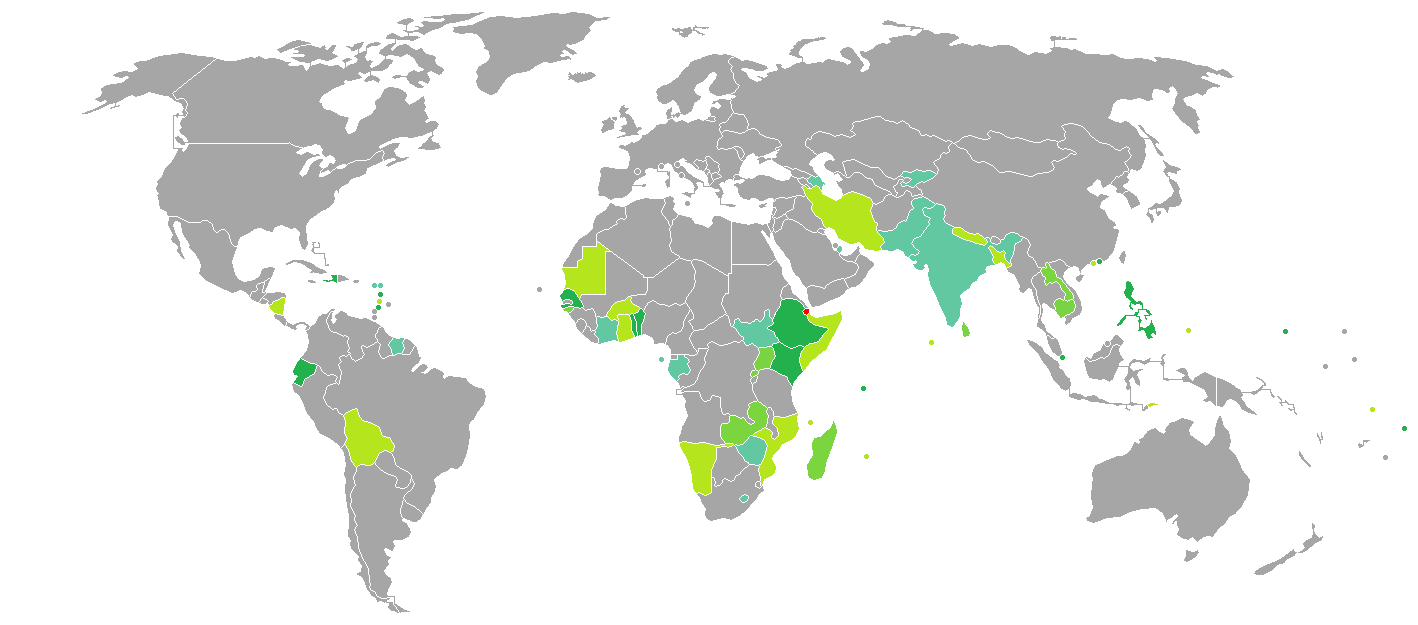
Visa requirements for Djiboutian citizens Djibouti Visa not required Visa obtainable on arrival eVisa Visa available both on arrival or online Pre-arrival visa required

Visa requirements for Djiboutian citizens are administrative entry restrictions by the authorities of other states placed on citizens of Djibouti. As of 2 July 2022, Djiboutian citizens had visa-free or visa on arrival access to 48 countries and territories, ranking the Djiboutian citizens 98th in terms of travel freedom according to the Henley Passport Index.

== See also ==
- Visa requirements for Djiboutian citizens
- List of passports
