= Nisrin Barwari =

Iraqi politician

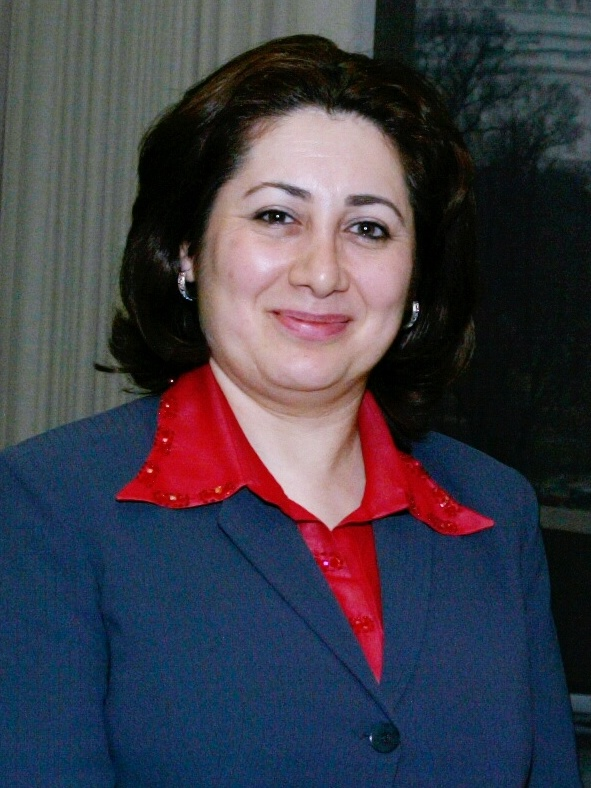
- Barwari in 2004
- Born: 1967 (age 58–59); Baghdad, Iraq
- Occupations: Politician, public official
- Known for: Iraqi Minister for Municipalities and Public Works

Nisrin Barwari (or Nisreen Barwari; born 1967) is an Iraqi Kurdish politician who acted as Iraqi Minister for Municipalities and Public Works following the US occupation of Iraq in 2003 and held it until 2006.

== Early life and education ==
Barwari was born in Baghdad in 1967 to a Kurdish family and was imprisoned with her family at age fourteen by the Ba'athist regime due to her brother's involvement with the Kurdish movement. Her family are of Kurdish origin from Erbil and close to the Barzani family.

She obtained a Bachelor of Science in architectural engineering at the University of Baghdad in 1991. After the failed Kursdish uprising of 1991, she fled Baghdad and joined the United Nations High Commission for Refugees as an administrator. Following the 1991 Gulf War, Barwari fled to Turkish Kurdistan as a displaced person.

She served with the United Nations local office in Iraqi Kurdistan from 1991 to 1998. After obtaining a master of public administration at the Harvard Kennedy School in 1999, she served as minister of reconstruction and development in KRG until 2003.

She obtained a PhD from the Technical University of Dortmund in 2015.

== Political activities ==
She joined the Kurdistan Democratic Party and served as the minister of reconstruction and development between 1999 and 2003 in the Kurdistan Regional Government. She was also the minister for migration and refugee affairs for the Kurdistan government.

Barwari was appointed Iraq's Minister for Municipalities and Public Works in September 2003, the only woman out of 25 ministers on the Iraqi Governing Council. In June 2004, she was reappointed minister in the Iraqi Transitional Government. In January 2005 she was elected to the Iraq National Assembly, but resigned her membership to continue as minister. She remained in the post until 2006.

Berwari has displayed concern for the rights of women in Iraq. In January 2004, she joined protests against Resolution 137 of the Iraqi Governing Council that would have curtailed women's rights by making Iraq's personal status law subject to religious doctrine. During her time as minister in Baghdad she survived several assassination attempts.

== Academia ==
In 2006, Barwari took a year out of Iraqi politics to study at Harvard Kennedy School. She also has a PhD in Spatial Planning from the University of Dortmund.

Barwari is an associate professor at the University of Duhok. She is a Planning Steering Committee member of the Duhok governorate and a representative of FWE, a Non Governmental Organization (NGO) focusing on humanitarian assistance to displaced Iraqi and Syrian refugees into the KRG. Barwari also writes and researches on Iraq's political economy for the LSE.

Barwari has a company manufacturing edible products made from apples grown in the Duhok region.

== NGO involvement ==
In 2005 Barwari established a non-government organization entitled Breezes of Hope of which she is the president.

== Personal life ==
Barwari's first husband was Ghazi Al Yawer with whom she married in 2004. They later divorced, and Barwari married a man from the Barzani tribe.
