= Raja Habib al-Khuzaai =

Member of the Iraqi National Assembly

- رجاء حبيب الخزاعي
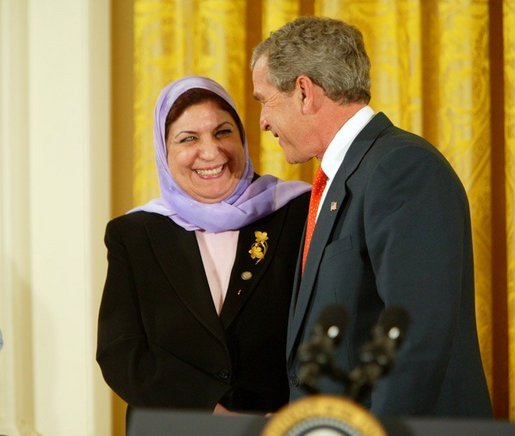
- President George W. Bush greets Dr. Raja Habib al-Khuzaai

Member of the Governing Council
- In office July 2003 – 28 June 2004
- Preceded by: Council created
- Succeeded by: Council dissolved

Personal details
- Born: Iraq
- Party: National Iraqi Alliance
- Profession: Doctor, Politician

Raja Habib al-Khuzaai was a member of the Interim Iraq Governing Council, created following the United States's 2003 invasion of Iraq, and one of only three women on the twenty-five-member governing body. She has also been a member of the Iraqi National Assembly, elected under the banner of the United Iraqi Alliance. Although she lived in the United Kingdom in the 1960s and 1970s, she returned to Iraq in 1977. A Shia Muslim, al-Khuazaai is a medical doctor who currently directs a maternity hospital in the southern Iraqi city of Diwaniyah.
