= Hamid al-Bayati =

Iraqi diplomat, academic and author

Ambassador T. Hamid al Bayati

Permanent Representative of Iraq to the United Nations
- In office April 2006 – April 2013
- Preceded by: Samir Sumaidaie
- Succeeded by: Mohamed Ali Alhakim

T. Hamid al Bayati (Arabic: حامد البياتي) is an Iraqi diplomat, academic and author.

Bayati earned his bachelor's degree from Baghdad University, his master's degree from Cairo University and a Doctorate in Politics from Manchester University in Manchester, England

From 2004 until 2006 al-Bayat was the deputy foreign minister of Iraq for political affairs and bilateral relations. He then went on to become the Permanent Representative of Iraq to the United Nations from 2006 until 2013. In 2006, his initial year in the post, he was elected Chairman of the Third Committee (Social, Humanitarian and Cultural) of the sixty-first United Nations General Assembly.

Bayati is the author of numerous books including; "From Dictatorship to Democracy An Insider's Account of the Iraqi Opposition to Saddam" published by the University of Pennsylvania Press (2011) with a foreword by Peter Galbraith. He has appeared among other places on the Daily Show hosted by Jon Stewart in support of this volume.

Presently, Bayati is an adjunct professor at Fordham University and Rutgers University and Fordham University and has also taught in recent years at Fairleigh Dickinson University. He often teaches on the subject of the United Nations. He is also a senior Consultant on International Issues in the areas of Political science; Middle East affairs; Leadership and Human rights at the Fordham Institute for Research, Service, Teaching (FIRST).

Al-Bayati was a 2017 recipient an Albert Schweitzer Leadership award.
