= Sondul Chapouk =

Iraqi politician

Sondul Chapouk was a member of the Interim Iraq Governing Council created following the United States' 2003 invasion of Iraq. She was the only Turk and one of only three women in the council. A member of the Turkoman minority from the city of Kirkuk, Chapouk is also the head of the Iraqi Women's Organization and is an engineer and teacher by training.
