= Visa requirements for Djiboutian citizens =

Administrative entry restrictions

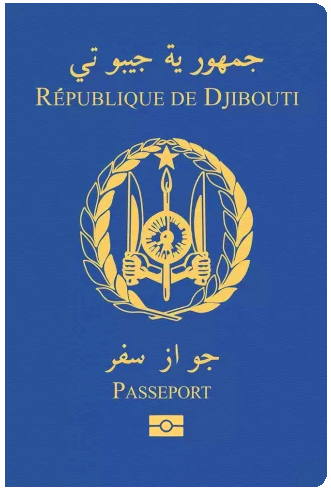
A Djiboutian passport

Visa requirements for Djiboutian citizens are administrative entry restrictions by the authorities of other states placed on citizens of Djibouti. As of 2026, Djiboutian citizens had visa-free or visa on arrival access to 45 countries and territories, ranking the Djibouti passport 87th in terms of travel freedom according to the Henley Passport Index.

== Visa requirements map ==
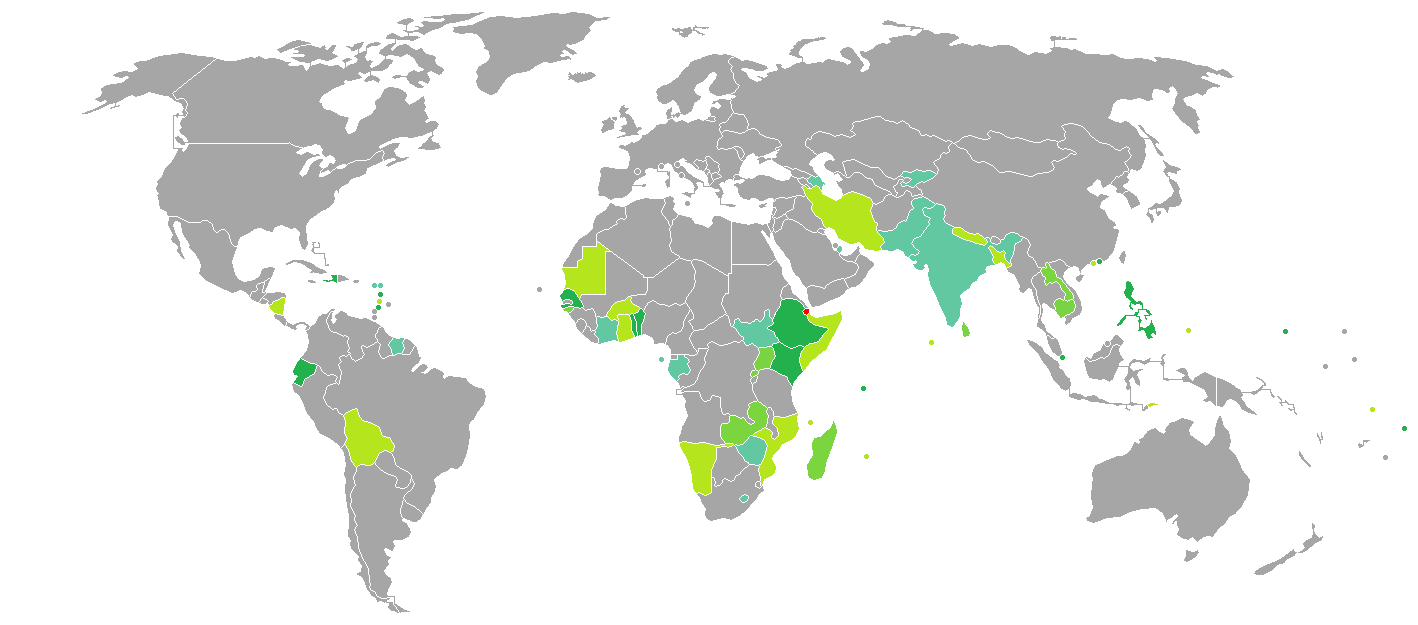
Visa requirements for Djiboutian citizens Djibouti Visa not required Visa obtainable on arrival eVisa Visa available both on arrival or online Pre-arrival visa required

== Visa requirements ==
| Country | Visa requirement | Allowed stay | Notes (excluding departure fees) |
|---|---|---|---|
| Afghanistan | eVisa | | Visa is not required in case born in Afghanistan or can proof that one of their parents is a national of Afghanistan or born in Afghanistan.; e-Visa : Visitors must arrive at Kabul International (KBL). |
| Albania | eVisa | 90 days | Visa is not required for Holders of a valid multiple-entry Schengen, UK or US visa has been previously used once or residence permit of Schengen, UK, US or UAE 10 years. |
| Algeria | Visa required | | |
| Andorra | Visa required | | |
| Angola | Visa required | | |
| Antigua and Barbuda | eVisa | 90 days | |
| Argentina | Visa required | | The AVE (High Speed Travel) is open to Djiboutian citizens holding valid, current ordinary passports traveling to Argentina for tourism. To do so, they must hold a valid category B2/J/B1/O/P (P1-P2-P3)/E/H-1B visa issued by the United States of America. |
| Armenia | Visa required | | |
| Australia | Visa required | | May apply online (Online Visitor e600 visa). |
| Austria | Visa required | | |
| Azerbaijan | eVisa | 30 days | |
| Bahamas | eVisa | 90 days | |
| Bahrain | eVisa | 14 days | |
| Bangladesh | Visa on arrival | 30 days | |
| Barbados | Visa required | | |
| Belarus | Visa required | | |
| Belgium | Visa required | | |
| Belize | Visa required | | |
| Benin | Visa not required | | |
| Bhutan | eVisa | 90 days | Visa fee is 40 USD per person and visa application may be processed within 5 business days with duration of stay of 90 days.; e-Visa applicant is also subject to pay Sustainable Development Fee |
| Bolivia | eVisa / Visa on arrival | 90 days | |
| Bosnia and Herzegovina | Visa required | | |
| Botswana | eVisa | 90 days | |
| Brazil | Visa required | | |
| Brunei | Visa required | | |
| Bulgaria | Visa required | | |
| Burkina Faso | eVisa | 1 month | |
| Burundi | Visa on arrival | | |
| Cambodia | eVisa / Visa on arrival | 30 days | |
| Cameroon | eVisa | | |
| Canada | Visa required | | |
| Cape Verde | Visa on arrival | 3 months | Visa on arrival at Sal, Boa Vista, São Vicente or Santiago international airports.; Requirement to register online 5 days before arrival; Also pay the airport security fee of CVE 3400 either online or on arrival. |
| Central African Republic | Visa required | | |
| Chad | eVisa | 90 days | |
| Chile | Visa required | | |
| China | Visa required | | |
| Colombia | eVisa | 90 days | May apply online. |
| Comoros | Visa on arrival | 45 days | |
| Republic of the Congo | Visa required | | |
| Democratic Republic of the Congo | eVisa | 90 days | |
| Costa Rica | Visa required | | |
| Côte d'Ivoire | eVisa | 90 days | e-Visa holders must arrive via Port Bouet Airport. |
| Croatia | Visa required | | |
| Cuba | eVisa | 90 days | |
| Cyprus | Visa required | | |
| Czech Republic | Visa required | | |
| Denmark | Visa required | | |
| Dominica | Visa not required | 21 days | |
| Dominican Republic | Visa required | | Holders of a valid visa or a residence permit of any member state of the Schengen Area, Canada, Cyprus, Ireland, the United Kingdom or the United States may enter the Dominican Republic without a visa. |
| Ecuador | Visa not required | 90 days | |
| Egypt | Visa required | | |
| El Salvador | eVisa | 90 days | |
| Equatorial Guinea | eVisa | 90 days | |
| Eritrea | Visa required | | |
| Estonia | Visa required | | |
| Eswatini | Visa required | | |
| Ethiopia | Visa not required | 3 months | |
| Fiji | Visa required | | |
| Finland | Visa required | | |
| France | Visa required | | |
| Gabon | eVisa | 90 days | Electronic visa holders must arrive via Libreville International Airport. |
| Gambia | Visa not required | | |
| Georgia | eVisa | 30 days | |
| Germany | Visa required | | |
| Ghana | Visa on arrival | 30 days | |
| Greece | Visa required | | |
| Grenada | Visa required | | |
| Guatemala | Visa required | | |
| Guinea | eVisa | 90 days | |
| Guinea-Bissau | Visa on arrival | 90 days | |
| Guyana | Visa required | | |
| Haiti | Visa not required | 3 months | |
| Honduras | Visa required | | Visa is not required if holding a valid visa for at least 6 months at the time of arrival, issued by Canada, the United States or a Schengen Area Member State. |
| Hungary | Visa required | | |
| Iceland | Visa required | | |
| India | eVisa | 60 days | e-Visa holders must arrive via 32 designated airports (Note: Ahmedabad; Amritsar; Bagdogra; Bengaluru; Bhubaneswar; Chandigarh; Chennai; Coimbatore; Delhi; Gaya; Goa-Dabolim; Goa-Manohar; Guwahati; Hyderabad; Indore; Jaipur; Kannur; Kochi; Kolkata; Kozhikode; Lucknow; Madurai; Mangaluru; Mumbai; Nagpur; Port Blair; Pune; Surat; Thiruvananthapuram; Tiruchirappalli; Varanasi; Visakhapatnam) or 5 designated seaports. (Note: Chennai; Cochin; Mormugao (Goa); Mumbai; Mangalore); An Indian e-Tourist Visa may only be obtained twice within 1 calendar year.; Foreigners of Pakistani origin or who hold a Pakistani Passport are not eligible for an e-Visa. Foreigners who are not Pakistani nationals, but whose parents or grandparents (either paternal or maternal) were born in, or were permanent residents in Pakistan, are also not eligible for an e-Visa. |
| Indonesia | Visa required | | |
| Iran | eVisa/Visa on arrival | 30 days | |
| Iraq | eVisa | 30 days | |
| Ireland | Visa required | | |
| Israel | Visa required | | |
| Italy | Visa required | | |
| Jamaica | Visa required | | |
| Japan | Visa required | | Eligible for an e-Visa if residing in one these countries Australia, Brazil, Cambodia, Canada, India, Saudi Arabia, Singapore, South Africa, Taiwan, United Arab Emirates, United Kingdom, United States.; May apply online |
| Jordan | Visa required | | |
| Kazakhstan | eVisa | | |
| Kenya | Electronic Travel Authorisation | 90 days | Applications can be submitted up to 90 days prior to travel and must be submitted at least 3 days in advance.; eTA fee is USD 32.50.; eTA is good for single entry, but visitors who leave Kenya to other EAC countries may re-enter provided that their eTA is still valid; Proof of reservation at the hotel where visitors plan to stay is required (if staying with friends, an invitation letter is also acceptable).; Yellow fever vaccination certificate is required if coming from endemic countries.; Can also be entered on an East Africa tourist visa issued by Rwanda or Uganda. |
| Kiribati | Visa required | | |
| North Korea | Visa required | | |
| South Korea | Visa required | | Multiple-Entry Visa may be granted to Palestinians who entered South Korea 4 or more times within the last 2 years, or 10 or more visits in total (one of those 10 visits should be within the last 2 years).; May apply online |
| Kuwait | Visa required | | e-Visa can be obtained for holders of a Residence Permit issued by a GCC member state under the following conditions: To be 18 years old and over.; The residence permit for a GCC state must be valid for at least another 3 months.; To be accompanied by the sponsor of the residence permit if the sponsor is an individual.; Does not apply to holders of a GCC Student Visa and Non-Skilled Worker Visa |
| Kyrgyzstan | eVisa | | |
| Laos | eVisa / Visa on arrival | 30 days | 18 (Note: Savannakhet Airport; Lanetoui - Mengkang (China); Meuangmom - Wan Pong (Myanmar); Banvang - Ban Khok Phai (Thailand); Namngeun - Huay Kon (Thailand); Paksan - Bueng Kan (Thailand); Paktaphan - Pak Saeng (Thailand); Pangmon - Ban Huak (Thailand); Phoudou (Thailand); Dak ta ock - Nam Giang (Vietnam); La Lai (Vietnam); Namkan (Vietnam); Namphao - Cau Treo (Vietnam); Namsoy - Na Meo (Vietnam); Naphao - Cha Lo (Vietnam); Pahang - Long Sap (Vietnam); Panghok - Tây Trang (Vietnam); Phoukeua - Bo Y (Vietnam)) of the 33 border crossings are only open to regular visa holders.; e-Visa may be used to enter Laos through the Luang Prabang, Pakse and Vientiane international airports, 3 Thai-Lao Friendship Bridges (Note: Vientiane (Friendship Bridge 1); Savannakhet (Friendship Bridge 2); Bokeo (Friendship Bridge 4)), in Boten (road and railroad), and in Vientiane (at Khamsavath railway station).; Visa on arrival is available at the Luang Prabang, Pakse and Vientiane international airports, 4 Thai-Lao Friendship Bridges (Note: Vientiane (Friendship Bridge 1); Savannakhet (Friendship Bridge 2); Khammouane (Friendship Bridge 3); Bokeo (Friendship Bridge 4)) and 7 border crossings. (Note: Nongnokkheane - Trapeang Kriel (Cambodia); Boten - Bo han (China); Golden Triangle/Samliemkham (Thailand); Khamsavath railway station (Thailand); Namheuang - Ban Na Kraseng (Thailand); Vang tao - Chongmek (Thailand); Dansavan - Lao Bảo (Vietnam)) |
| Latvia | Visa required | | |
| Lebanon | Visa required | | |
| Lesotho | eVisa | | |
| Liberia | eVisa | | |
| Libya | eVisa | | |
| Liechtenstein | Visa required | | |
| Lithuania | Visa required | | |
| Luxembourg | Visa required | | |
| Madagascar | eVisa / Visa on arrival | 90 days | |
| Malawi | eVisa | 30 days | |
| Malaysia | eVisa | 14 days | |
| Maldives | Visa on arrival | 30 days | |
| Mali | Visa required | | |
| Malta | Visa required | | |
| Marshall Islands | Visa required | | |
| Mauritania | eVisa | | |
| Mauritius | Visa on arrival | 60 days | |
| Mexico | Visa required | | Visa is not required for Holders of a valid visa of Canada, US, UK or a Schengen State and Permanent residence of Canada, Chile, Colombia, Schengen State, Japan, UK, US; Entry may be refused by immigration officials for individuals who were previously denied a US visa, even if holding a valid Mexican visa. |
| Micronesia | Visa not required | 30 days | |
| Moldova | eVisa | | visa not required if holding a valid visa /residence permit that is issued by a European Union member state or Schengen Area, Canada, Ireland, UK, US |
| Monaco | Visa required | | |
| Mongolia | eVisa | 30 days | |
| Montenegro | Visa required | | Visa not required for holders of a valid Australia, Japan, Canada, New Zealand, Ireland, US, UK or a Schengen Visa.; Holders of residence permit in the United Arab Emirates may enter, in Montenegro for a duration of 10 days |
| Morocco | Visa required | | May apply for an e-Visa if holding a valid visa or a residency document issued by one of the following countries: Schengen Area, Australia, Canada, Ireland, New Zealand, United Kingdom, United States a residency document issued by Cyprus, Japan, United Arab Emirates. |
| Mozambique | eVisa /Visa on arrival | 30 days | |
| Myanmar | Visa required | | |
| Namibia | eVisa/Visa on arrival | 90 days | |
| Nauru | Visa required | | |
| Nepal | eVisa / Visa on arrival | 90 days | |
| Netherlands | Visa required | | |
| New Zealand | Visa required | | Holders of an Australian Permanent Resident Visa or Resident Return Visa may be granted a New Zealand Resident Visa on arrival permitting indefinite stay (pursuant to the Trans-Tasman Travel Arrangement), subject to meeting character requirements and obtaining an Electronic Travel Authority prior to departure. |
| Nicaragua | Visa on arrival | 30 days | |
| Niger | Visa required | | |
| Nigeria | eVisa | 90 days | |
| North Macedonia | Visa required | | Visa is not required for stays upto 15 days if holding a valid multiple entry visa of Canada, the United States, United Kingdom, Schengen Area member state, or residence permit of Schengen Area member state. |
| Norway | Visa required | | |
| Oman | Visa required | | |
| Pakistan | eVisa | | Online Visa eligible.; Electronic Travel Authorization to obtain a visa on arrival for business purposes. |
| Palau | Visa on arrival | 30 days | |
| Panama | Visa required | | |
| Papua New Guinea | eVisa | 60 days | May apply for an e-visa under the type of "Tourist - Own Itinerary" |
| Paraguay | Visa required | | |
| Peru | Visa required | | |
| Philippines | Visa not required | 30 days | |
| Poland | Visa required | | |
| Portugal | Visa required | | |
| Qatar | eVisa | | |
| Romania | Visa required | | |
| Russia | Visa required | | |
| Rwanda | eVisa / Visa on arrival | 30 days | |
| Saint Kitts and Nevis | eVisa | | |
| Saint Lucia | Visa on arrival | 6 weeks | |
| Saint Vincent and the Grenadines | Visa not required | 1 month | |
| Samoa | Visitor's Permit on arrival | 60 days | |
| San Marino | Visa required | | |
| São Tomé and Príncipe | eVisa | 15 days | |
| Saudi Arabia | Visa required | | Tourist visa on arrival for holders of a valid multiple entry visa from US, UK or Schengen area, under the condition that the multiple entry visa has been used at least once, proving that by showing the entry and exit stamps of the country of issuance. |
| Senegal | Visa not required | 90 days | |
| Serbia | Visa required | | |
| Seychelles | Visitor's Permit on arrival | 3 months | |
| Sierra Leone | eVisa | | |
| Singapore | Visa not required | 30 days | |
| Slovakia | Visa required | | |
| Slovenia | Visa required | | |
| Solomon Islands | Visa required | | |
| Somalia | eVisa | 30 days | |
| South Africa | Visa required | | |
| South Sudan | eVisa | | Obtainable online; Printed visa authorization must be presented at the time of travel |
| Spain | Visa required | | |
| Sri Lanka | ETA / Visa on arrival | 30 days | Electronic Travel Authorization can also be obtained on arrival.; 30 days extendable to 6 months.; The standard visitor visa allows a stay of 60 days within any 6-month period.; Visa fees (for Standard visitor visa): SAARC - USD 35; Non SAARC - USD 75; e-Visa categories will be charged an additional USD 18.50 service fee.; If transiting from any of the Sri Lankan airports, An e-Visa is exempted (2 day transit period). |
| Sudan | Visa required | | |
| Suriname | eVisa | | |
| Sweden | Visa required | | |
| Switzerland | Visa required | | |
| Syria | eVisa | | |
| Tajikistan | eVisa | 45 days | |
| Tanzania | Visa not required | | |
| Thailand | eVisa | | |
| Timor-Leste | Visa on arrival | 30 days | |
| Togo | eVisa | 15 days | |
| Tonga | Visa required | | |
| Trinidad and Tobago | eVisa | | |
| Tunisia | Visa required | | |
| Turkey | Visa required | | |
| Turkmenistan | Visa required | | |
| Tuvalu | Visa on arrival | 1 month | |
| Uganda | eVisa / Visa on arrival | 3 months | May apply online. |
| Ukraine | Visa required | | |
| United Arab Emirates | eVisa | | |
| United Kingdom and Crown dependencies | Visa required | | |
| United States | Visa required | | |
| Uruguay | Visa required | | |
| Uzbekistan | Visa required | | |
| Vanuatu | Visa required | | |
| Vatican City | Visa required | | Open borders but de facto follows Italian visa policy. |
| Venezuela | Visa required | | |
| Vietnam | eVisa | | Visa free for 30 days when visiting Phú Quốc |
| Yemen | Visa required | | |
| Zambia | eVisa / Visa on arrival | 90 days | |
| Zimbabwe | eVisa | | |

== Dependent, Disputed, or Restricted territories ==
Unrecognized or partially recognized countries

| Territory | Conditions of access | Notes |
|---|---|---|
| Abkhazia | Visa required | |
| Kosovo | Visa required | Do not need a visa a holder of a valid biometric residence permit issued by one of the Schengen member states or a valid multi-entry Schengen Visa, a holder of a valid Laissez-Passer issued by United Nations Organizations, NATO, OSCE, Council of Europe or European Union a holder of a valid travel documents issued by EU Member and Schengen States, United States of America, Canada, Australia and Japan based on the 1951 Convention on Refugee Status or the 1954 Convention on the Status of Stateless Persons, as well as holders of valid travel documents for foreigners (max. 15 days stay) |
| Northern Cyprus | Visa not required | |
| Palestine | Visa not required | Arrival by sea to Gaza Strip not allowed. |
| Sahrawi Arab Democratic Republic | | Undefined visa regime in the Western Sahara controlled territory. |
| Somaliland | Visa on arrival | 30 days for 30 US dollars, payable on arrival. |
| South Ossetia | Visa not required | Multiple entry visa to Russia and three day prior notification are required to enter South Ossetia. |
| Taiwan | Visa required | |
| Transnistria | Visa not required | Registration required after 24h. |

Dependent and autonomous territories

| Territory | Conditions of access | Notes |
China
| Hong Kong | Visa not required | 14 days |
| Macau | Visa on arrival | |
Denmark
| Faroe Islands | Visa required | |
| Greenland | Visa required | |
France
| French Guiana | Visa required | |
| French Polynesia | Visa required | |
| (France) French West Indies | Visa required | Includes overseas departments of Guadeloupe and Martinique and overseas collectivities of Saint Barthélemy and Saint Martin. |
| Mayotte | Visa required | |
| New Caledonia | Visa required | |
| Réunion | Visa required | |
| Saint Pierre and Miquelon | Visa required | |
| Wallis and Futuna | Visa required | |
Netherlands
| Aruba | Visa required | |
| Caribbean Netherlands | Visa required | Includes Bonaire, Sint Eustatius and Saba. |
| Curaçao | Visa required | |
| Sint Maarten | Visa required | |
New Zealand
| Cook Islands | Visa not required | 31 days |
| Niue | Visa not required | 30 days |
| Tokelau | Visa required | |
United Kingdom
| Akrotiri and Dhekelia | Visa required | |
| Anguilla | Visa required | Holders of a valid visa issued by the United Kingdom do not require a visa. |
| Bermuda | Visa required | Visa free for a maximum stay of 3 months if transiting through the United Kingdom. |
| British Indian Ocean Territory | Special permit required | Special permit required. |
| British Virgin Islands | Visa required | |
| Cayman Islands | Visa required | |
| Falkland Islands | Visa required | |
| Gibraltar | Visa required | |
| Montserrat | eVisa | |
| Pitcairn Islands | Visa not required | 14 days visa free and landing fee US$35 or tax of US$5 if not going ashore. |
| Ascension Island | eVisa | 3 months within any year period |
| Saint Helena | eVisa | |
| Tristan da Cunha | Permission required | Permission to land required for 15/30 pounds sterling (yacht/ship passenger) for Tristan da Cunha Island or 20 pounds sterling for Gough Island, Inaccessible Island or Nightingale Islands. |
| South Georgia and the South Sandwich Islands | Permit required | Pre-arrival permit from the Commissioner required (72 hours/1 month for 110/160 pounds sterling). |
| Turks and Caicos Islands | Visa required | Holders of a valid visa issued by Canada, United Kingdom or the USA do not required a visa for a maximum stay of 90 days. |
United States
| American Samoa | Visa required | |
| Guam | Visa required | |
| Northern Mariana Islands | Visa required | |
| Puerto Rico | Visa required | |
| U.S. Virgin Islands | Visa required | |
Antarctica and adjacent islands
Special permits required for Bouvet Island, British Antarctic Territory, French Southern and Antarctic Lands, Argentine Antarctica, (Australia) Australian Antarctic Territory, (Antártica Chilena Province) Chilean Antarctic Territory, (Australia) Heard Island and McDonald Islands, (Norway) Peter I Island, (Norway) Queen Maud Land, (New Zealand) Ross Dependency.

== See also ==
- Visa policy of Djibouti
- Djibouti passport
