= Abderrahman Sadik Karim =

Iraqi politician

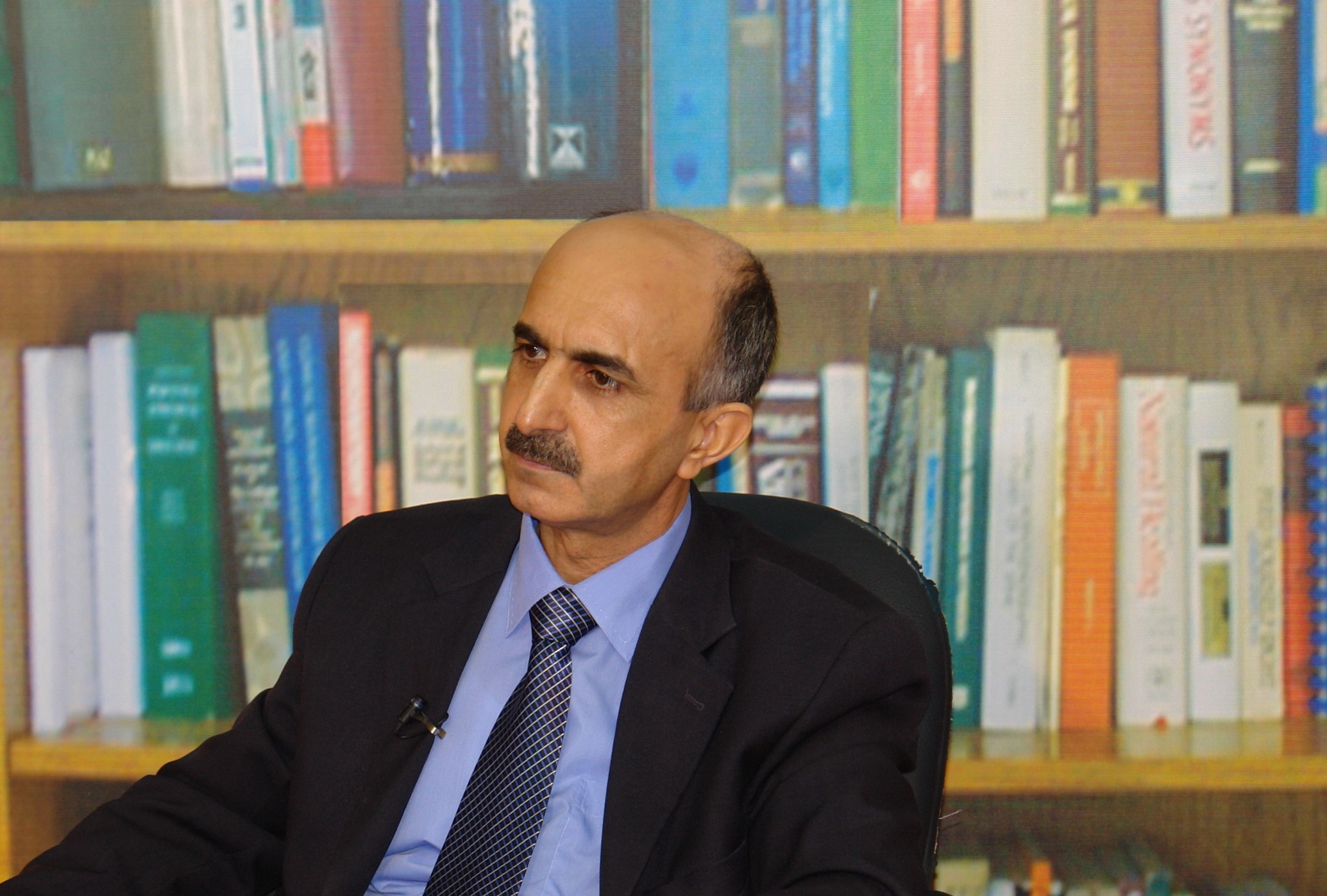
Abdulrahman Sdiq

Abderrahman Sadik Karim (born 2 March 1962 in Kirkuk) was Minister of Environment in the first cabinet appointed by the Interim Iraq Governing Council in September 2003. A Kurd, Karim is an engineer and environmental activist.

Preceded by Coalition Provisional Authority	Minister for the Environment; September 2003 – June 2004	Succeeded by none
