= Bahnam Zaya Bulos =

Iraqi politician (born 1944)

Bahnam Zaya Bulos (Arabic: بهنام زيا بولص; born 1944) was minister of transport in the cabinet appointed by the Interim Iraq Governing Council in September 2003. A member of Iraq's Assyrian Christian minority, Bulos is originally from Baghdad, where he worked as a civil engineer.

Preceded by Coalition Provisional Authority	Minister of Transport; September 2003 – June 2004	Succeeded by Louei Hatim Sultan al-Aris
