= Omar Farouk =

Somali scholar (1939/40–2011)

Sheikh Omar Farouk Mufti
- Shiikh Cumar Faaruuq Cabdi Suldaan شيخ عمر فاروق حاجي عبدي سلطان

Personal life
- Born: 1939 or 1940 Qooxle or Carmaale, Kebri Dahar, Somali Region
- Died: March 8, 2011 Mecca, Saudi Arabia

Religious life
- Religion: Islam
- Denomination: Sunni
- Jurisprudence: Shafi'i
- Creed: Salafi

Sheikh Omar Farouk Haji Abdi Sultan (Somali: Shiikh Cumar Faaruuq Cabdi Suldaan; Arabic: شيخ عمر فاروق حاجي عبدي سلطان) Somali cleric, scholar, Quran interpreter, and Islamic preacher.

== Life ==
Sheikh Omar Farouk was born in the village of (Somali: Qooxle or Somali: Carmaale) near the city of Kebri Dahar, Somali territory of Ethiopia in 1939. He became an orphan since his parents died when he was under the age of six and grew up under his grandmother's care.

Sheikh Omar Farouk memorized the Quran at the age of 11. He then began learning the Sharia of jurisprudence, Arab sciences, interpretation and talk on various senses in the region. He then left to seek science and received the sharia in both the Somali Region and NFD before arriving in the Somali capital of Mogadishu. He was taught by famous Ulama such as Sheikh Ibrahim Sule, then attended the Islamic Solidarity Institute of the Islamic University of Madinah, where he took Salafist creed. He joined the Islamic University of Medina in 1974 and received a bachelor's degree in sharia law, and then became a famous Sheikh Somali preacher touring Europe and Africa.

== Career of Dawah ==
Sheikh Omar Farouk began teaching Islamic jurisprudence and explaining the Quranic exegesis in the Somali capital, Mogadishu. He faced arrest under the rule of the Supreme Revolutionary Council, led by Somali President Siad Barre. The reason for his arrest was his interpretation of the Quranic verse of Suratul Al-An'am

وَكَذَٰلِكَ نُوَلِّي بَعْضَ الظَّالِمِينَ بَعْضًا بِمَا كَانُوا يَكْسِبُونَ

English: And thus We make some wrongdoers allies of others because of what they used to earn.
(Quran: 6:129)

He explained that if people do not adhere to their religion, Allah will place unjust rulers over them who will not show mercy. It was said that he implied Allah had imposed a tyrannical revolution upon the people, referring to Siad Barre's revolution. Consequently, he was imprisoned for forty-two days before being released.

After joining the Islamic University in Saudi Arabia in 1974, Sheikh Omar Farouk recorded the full interpretation of the Quran and broadcast the reputation of these recordings, being distinct from the rest of his peers. He also recorded the Nahwa, Al-Sarf, Al-Sīra al-Nabawiyya, Life of Sahab and Riyad as-Salihin, and many different Islamic sciences.

== Assassination attempt ==
Sheikh Omar Farouk was a vocal critic of the Ethiopian invasion and survived two assassination attempts by the Ethiopian Intelligence Agency, once in the late 1990s and again in 2001. These attempts were due to his status as one of the most prominent Somali Salafists criticizing Ethiopian intervention benefited the Somali Civil War.

== Recconciliation ==
After the collapse of the Somali Republic in 1991, Sheikh Omar Farouk endeavored to unite the fragmented Somali community, heal the rifts, and bring people together under a single leadership. To this end, he visited Somalia several times in the 1990s and participated in the Somali National Peace Conference held in Arta, Djibouti in 2000.

The conference resulted in the agreement on Transitional National Government of Somalia, led by Abdiqasim Salad Hassan. The President of Djibouti, Ismail Omar Guelleh, granted Sheikh Omar Farouk Djiboutian citizenship and an honorary seat in the Transitional Somali Parliament. He was present at the conference proceedings and was the one who administered the constitutional oath to President Abdiqasim Salad Hassan.

After Ethiopian occupation of Somalia the withdrawal of Ethiopian forces from Mogadishu in 2009, Sheikh Omar Farouk was one of the most prominent scholars supporting national reconciliation and the initiative of Sharif Sheikh Ahmed's wing of the Alliance for the Re-liberation of Somalia. Sheikh Omar Farouk was also a staunch critic of the Al-Shabaab militant and its military and ideological methods.

== Death ==
On March 8, 2011, Sheikh Omar Farouk died at the age of 71 in Mecca, Saudi Arabia, and was buried there. Somali scholars, entrepreneurs, sheikhs, and government officials expressed their condolences on his death.

== Legacy ==
On November 20, 2019, a ceremony was held in Mogadishu to launch the Sheikh Omar Farouk Foundation for Da'wah and Development, dedicated to preserving Farouk's legacy. The foundation aims to collect his scholarly works, including his Quranic exegesis and various fatwas issued on different occasions and concerning various topics relevant to the lives of Somali communities, both abroad and within Somalia.

== See also ==
- Sheikh Mohamed Moalim
