= Mohammad Jassem Khodayyir =

Iraqi politician

Mohammad Jassem Khodayyir was Minister for Immigration in the cabinet appointed by the Interim Iraq Governing Council in September 2003. A Shia Muslim, Khodayyir is a member of the Supreme Islamic Iraqi Council and is a member of the political bureau Islamic Dawaa Party.

| Preceded by Coalition Provisional Authority | Minister for Immigration; September 2003 – June 2004 | Succeeded by Pascal Esho Warda |
