= Khodayyir Abbas =

Iraqi surgeon and former health minister

- خضير عباس

Minister of Health of Iraq
- In office September 2003 – June 2004
- Succeeded by: Alaa Abdessaheb al-Alwan

Personal details
- Born: Basra, Iraq
- Party: Islamic Dawa Party
- Occupation: Surgeon, politician

Khodayyir Abbas, also known as Khudair Abbas, is an Iraqi surgeon and politician who served as Minister of Health from September 2003 to June 2004. He was appointed to the cabinet by the Iraqi Governing Council. An Islamic Dawa Party politician, he had worked as a surgeon in Britain before returning to Iraq in 2003.

== Early life and medical career ==
Abbas was born and raised in Basra. He graduated in medicine in 1972 and subsequently undertook an internship, rural medical work, military service and residency training in Basra.

He moved to Britain in 1979 for postgraduate study and remained there in exile after opposing the Iran–Iraq War. In 1990, he became a fellow of the Royal College of Surgeons of Edinburgh and took up a surgical post at King George Hospital in Ilford, east London. He worked in the National Health Service as a general surgeon, specialising in breast cancer surgery. He returned to Iraq in June 2003, when he and medical colleagues worked on establishing a primary healthcare centre in Baghdad.

== Minister of Health ==
Abbas, a Shia Muslim, was named health minister on 1 September 2003 as part of the first cabinet appointed by the Iraqi Governing Council after the 2003 invasion of Iraq. His work focused on rebuilding the country's health services.

In October 2003, he prepared a plan for the future health system and an assessment of immediate needs in collaboration with the World Health Organization and the Coalition Provisional Authority (CPA). He sought US$1.6 billion in additional funding at the Madrid donors' conference for reconstruction over the following four years. The immediate priorities included restoring disease surveillance, medicine supplies and basic hospital services.

That month, Abbas announced controls on medicine procurement, including checks on suppliers and laboratory testing of imported drugs. He also said that private healthcare should be developed without reducing support for the public sector.

In late 2003, at a seminar at the London School of Hygiene and Tropical Medicine, he called on Iraqi doctors working abroad to return, even temporarily, to advise and train local staff. His stated priorities included decentralising healthcare, strengthening primary care, and improving maternity and paediatric services. He also proposed free medical services for all Iraqis while encouraging private provision for patients able to pay.

On 15 December 2003, Abbas and other Iraqi doctors met US President George W. Bush to discuss healthcare needs, medical education and cooperation with American medical professionals.

On 28 March 2004, the CPA transferred administrative authority over the ministry to Iraqi officials. It was the first Iraqi ministry to undergo this transfer. The CPA continued to provide technical assistance and to oversee US reconstruction funding for healthcare.

Security concerns required Abbas to travel to the ministry in a guarded convoy, varying his route and departure time.

Abbas was succeeded by Alaa Abdessaheb al-Alwan in June 2004. That month, both attended a ten-day healthcare training programme in Beirut, organised by the World Bank Institute and the American University of Beirut, which addressed health reform and reconstruction in Iraq.

Preceded by Coalition Provisional Authority	Minister of Health; September 2003 – June 2004	Succeeded by Alaa Abdessaheb al-Alwan
