= Permanent Representative of Iraq to the United Nations =

List of Iraqi ambassadors to the United Nations

Ambassador of Iraq to the United Nations, more formally known as "Permanent Representative of the Republic of Iraq" leads Iraq delegation to the United Nations in New York City. The current Chargé d’Affaires ad interim is Dr. Abbas Kadhim Obaid.

== Office holders ==
The following is a chronological list of those who have held the office:

| # | Name | Years served | UN Secretary-General | Prime Minister of Iraq |
|---|---|---|---|---|
Iraqi Republic (1958–1968)
| 1 | Ismat T. Kittani (acting) | 1958–59 | Dag Hammarskjöld | Abd al-Karim Qasim |
| 2 | Adnan Pachachi | 1959–65 | Dag Hammarskjöld, U Thant | Abd al-Karim Qasim, Ahmed Hassan al-Bakr, Tahir Yahya |
| 3 | Khadim Kahlaf | 1965–67 | U Thant | Arif Abd ar-Razzaq, Abd ar-Rahman al-Bazzaz, Naji Talib, Abdul Rahman Arif, Tahir Yahya |
| 4 | Adnan Pachachi | 1967–69 | U Thant | Tahir Yahya |
Ba'athist Iraq (1968–2003)
| 4 | Adnan Pachachi | 1967–69 | U Thant | Abd ar-Razzaq an-Naif, Ahmed Hassan al-Bakr |
| 5 | Adnan Raouf (acting) | 1969–70 | U Thant | Ahmed Hassan al-Bakr |
| 6 | Talib el-Shibib | 1970–72 | U Thant, Kurt Waldheim | Ahmed Hassan al-Bakr |
| 7 | Abdul Karim al-Shaikhly | 1972–74 | Kurt Waldheim | Ahmed Hassan al-Bakr |
| 8 | Salah Omar al-Ali | 1980–82 | Kurt Waldheim, Javier Pérez de Cuéllar | Saddam Hussein |
| 9 | Riyadh al-Qaysi | 1983–86 | Javier Pérez de Cuéllar | Saddam Hussein |
| 10 | Ismat T. Kittani | 1986–89 | Javier Pérez de Cuéllar | Saddam Hussein |
| 11 | Abdul Amir al-Anbari | 1990–92 | Javier Pérez de Cuéllar | Saddam Hussein, Sa'dun Hammadi, Mohammed Hamza Zubeidi |
| 12 | Nizar Hamdoon | 1992–98 | Boutros Boutros-Ghali, Kofi Annan | Mohammed Hamza Zubeidi, Ahmad Husayn Khudayir as-Samarrai, Saddam Hussein |
| 13 | Saeed H. Hasan | 1999–2000 | Kofi Annan | Saddam Hussein |
| 14 | Mohammed A. Aldouri | 2001–03 | Kofi Annan | Saddam Hussein, |
Republic of Iraq (2003–2022)
| 15 | Samir Sumaidaie | 2004–06 | Kofi Annan | Ayad Allawi, Ibrahim al-Jaafari, Nouri al-Maliki |
| 16 | T. Hamid al Bayati | 2007–13 | Ban Ki-moon | Nouri al-Maliki |
| 17 | Mohamed Ali Alhakim | 2013–18 | Ban Ki-moon, António Guterres | Nouri al-Maliki, Haider al-Abadi |
| 18 | Mohammed Hussein Bahr al-Uloom | 2018–2022 | António Guterres | Haider al-Abadi, Adil Abdul-Mahdi, Mustafa Al-Kadhimi, Mohammed Shia' Al Sudani |
| 19 | Abbas Kadhim Obaid (acting) | 2022–present | António Guterres | Mohammed Shia' Al Sudani |

== See also ==
- Foreign relations of Iraq
- List of current permanent representatives to the United Nations
