= Visa policy of Djibouti =

Policy on permits required to enter Djibouti

All visitors to Djibouti must obtain either a visa on arrival to Djibouti, an electronic visa online or a visa from one of the Djiboutian diplomatic missions prior to arrival in Djibouti, unless they come from one of the visa exempt countries mentioned below.

== Visa policy map ==
Visa policy of Djibouti Djibouti Visa not required Visa on arrival / eVisa

== Visa exemption ==
Nationals of the following countries listed may enter Djibouti without a visa for an indefinite period of stay (unless otherwise stated):

| Country | Ordinary passport | Non-ordinary passport |
|---|---|---|
| Singapore | Yes | Yes |
| Benin | No | Yes ^{1 D O S} |
| China | Only if endorsed "for public affairs" | Yes |
| Egypt | No | Yes ^{1 D S} |
| Kenya | No | Yes ^{2 D O S} |
| India | No | Yes ^{1 D O S} |
| Libya | No | Yes ^{3 D} |
| Morocco | No | Yes ^{1 D O S} |
| Russia | No | Yes ^{1 D S} |
| Turkey | No | Yes ^{1 D S} |

_{1 - Up to a maximum stay of 90 days.}
_{2 - Up to a maximum stay of 60 days.}
_{3 - Up to a maximum stay of 14 days.}
_{D - Diplomatic passports}
_{O - Official passports}
_{S - Service passports}

According to the Hong Kong Immigration Department, citizens of Hong Kong can enter Djibouti without a visa for 14 days.

Djibouti signed visa exemption agreements for holders of diplomatic and service passports with Angola and Benin in February 2024 and they are yet to enter into force.

== Visa on arrival ==
According to Timatic, nationals of any country holding any type of valid passport may obtain a visa on arrival. However, the government of Djibouti only lists diplomatic, official and service passport holders as being eligible for a visa on arrival.

Several sources, apart from IATA Timatic, indicate that a visa on arrival is available in 2025/2026. The final decision is determined by the airline. Djibouti's government recommends that travellers apply for an eVisa.

== eVisa ==
On 18 February 2018, the government of Djibouti introduced an e-Visa system for foreign visitors intended to replace the visa on arrival system. Visitors can apply for a transit visa valid for 3 days or a single entry visit visa valid for 15-90 days. e-Visa is issued only for tourism or commerce purposes. Holders of e-Visa can enter Djibouti through Ambouli International Airport or any other border crossing.

A transit visa (from 1 to 14 days) costs $12 and a short stay visa (from 15 to 90 days) will cost $23.

== See also ==
- Visa requirements for Djiboutian citizens
