= Salama al-Khufaji =

Iraqi politician

Salama al-Khufaji was a member of the Interim Iraq Governing Council, created following the United States's 2003 invasion of Iraq. She was appointed on 8 December 2003 to hold the seat formerly held by Aquila al-Hashimi, who was assassinated in September 2003. A Shia Muslim, al-Khufaji was a professor of dentistry at Baghdad University.

In May 2004 she survived an assassination attempt, which occurred when the car in which she was traveling was ambushed and her teenage son was killed. Several bodyguards were also killed. Since then she has survived two additional assassination attempts, one later in 2004 and one in January 2005. She was a candidate in the Iraqi elections of 2005.
