= Mohsen Abdel Hamid =

68th prime minister of Iraq

Mohsen Abdel Hamid محسن عبد الحميد

President of the Governing Council of Iraq
- In office 1 February 2004 – 29 February 2004
- Preceded by: Adnan Pachachi
- Succeeded by: Mohammad Bahr al-Ulloum

Personal details
- Born: 1937 (age 88–89) Kirkuk, Kingdom of Iraq
- Party: Iraqi Islamic Party
- Profession: Lawyer

Mohsen Abdel Hamid (born 1937 Arabic: محسن عبد الحميد) is an Iraqi politician and Islamic scholar who was a member of the Interim Iraq Governing Council (president, February 2004), created following the United States's 2003 invasion of Iraq. He served as the President of the Governing Council of Iraq (42nd Prime Minister of Iraq).

== Biography ==
Abdel Hamid was born in 1937 in Kirkuk and is of Kurdish background. He studied Islamic Law in Cairo and returned to Iraq in 1986 to work as a professor at Baghdad University. Abdel Hamid has written over 30 books on interpretation of the Qur'an. He was arrested in 1996 by the government of Saddam Hussein but opposed the 2003 invasion of Iraq.

Until 2004 he was the secretary general of the Iraqi Islamic Party, the largest Sunni party in Iraq, and as a result was appointed to the Iraqi Governing Council.

On 30 May 2005, Abdel Hamid was mistakenly arrested by U.S. troops.

== External website ==
- Official website

Political offices
Preceded by Adnan Pachachi	President of the Governing Council of Iraq; 2004	Succeeded by Mohammad Bahr al-Ulloum
