= Aqila al-Hashimi =

Iraqi Governing Council member (1953–2003)

- عقيلة الهاشمي

Member of the Governing Council
- In office July 2003 – September 25, 2003
- Preceded by: Council created
- Succeeded by: Salama al-Khufaji

Personal details
- Born: 1953 Najaf, Iraq
- Died: September 25, 2003 (aged 50) Baghdad, Iraq
- Profession: Diplomat, Politician

Aqila al-Hashimi (Arabic عقيلة الهاشمي ^{c}Aqīla al-Hāshimī; 1953 - September 25, 2003) was an Iraqi politician who served on the Iraqi Governing Council.

Aqila al-Hashimi was born in 1953 into a prominent Shi'ite religious family in Najaf. She gained a degree in law in Iraq and a doctorate in French Literature at the Sorbonne.

She joined the Foreign Ministry in 1979 working as a French translator for Tariq Aziz. Al-Hashimi ran the Oil-for-Food Programme in the Foreign Ministry under Saddam Hussein.

She was one of only three women on the IGC and the only member of the former regime to have been on the council. She had been expected to become Iraq's new Ambassador to the United Nations

She died of abdomen wounds suffered five days earlier when her convoy was ambushed by six men in a pickup truck near her home in western Baghdad. The killing was blamed on supporters of the former president, Saddam Hussein.

The British politician George Galloway, who was strongly opposed to the war and who referred to attacks on coalition forces as a “bloody good hiding,” discussed her participation in the Governing Council in an interview shortly after her death, saying that although he derived no pleasure from her death, he denounced her role in the Iraqi Governing Council, calling her a "puppet minister."
