= Alaa Abdessaheb al-Alwan =

Iraqi politician

Ala Alwan (born 1949) is an Iraqi physician and Professor of Medicine and Global Health. He served as World Health Organization (WHO) Regional Director for the Eastern Mediterranean (2012–2017), and held several senior positions at WHO headquarters in Geneva, Switzerland, including Assistant Director General and Representative of the Director General between 2005 and 2012. In Iraq, he was Minister of Education (2003–2004), Minister of Health (2004–2005), and Minister of Health and Environment (2018–2019).

== Early life and education ==
Alwan was born in Baghdad to Abdessaheb Alwan, an economist and a former minister of Agriculture and Agrarian Reform in the government of Iraq. Alwan graduated in medicine from the University of Alexandria, Egypt. He subsequently practised medicine in the United Kingdom, where he completed his postgraduate training and obtained his professional qualifications. He is a Fellow of the Royal College of Physicians, London, and a Fellow of the Faculty of Public Health, London. Upon returning to Iraq, he held a range of positions in clinical medicine, academic medicine, and public health. Alwan later served as Professor and Dean of the Faculty of Medicine at Al-Mustansiriya University, Baghdad.

== Government service in Iraq ==
Alongside his academic appointments in the Ministry of Higher Education, Alwan held several key positions in the Ministry of Health. As Chairman of the National Board for the Selection of Medicines, he led the development of Iraq’s national medicines list, based on a comprehensive assessment of efficacy, safety, quality, and need. He co-authored, with Yousif Abou, the country’s first national formulary, the Iraqi Drug Guide, and served as editor of the Drug Information Bulletin. In September 2003, following the overthrow of Saddam Hussein's regime, Alwan was appointed as Minister of Education by the Interim Iraq Governing Council. He led the Ministry during the post-invasion reconstruction of the education sector, which had suffered extensive destruction and looting of schools and educational institutions. Alwan supervised the development of a process to revise the curriculum and the drafting of new interim de-politicised curricula for civic education and history. He authored Education in Iraq: Current Situation and New Perspectives (2004), published by the Ministry of Education, which assessed the education sector and set out a short- and medium-term strategy for its development. It also presented, for the first time, nationwide baseline data on educational facilities and staffing, establishing a foundation for future planning and reform.

In 2004, Alwan was seconded from the United Nations to serve as Minister of Health in the first national government in Iraq. After more than two decades of international sanctions and severe deterioration of health standards, he conducted an analytical review of the health situation in Iraq and developed a four-year vision and strategy for the reconstruction of the health sector. The initial phase focused on urgent priorities, rehabilitation of physical infrastructure, training and capacity-building, and resource mobilisation. He authored the first report on Health in Iraq, presenting an assessment of the health situation, a future vision, and priority areas of work. In 2018, Alwan returned to government as Minister of Health and Environment, serving until 2019.

== World Health Organization ==
Alwan joined the WHO Regional Office for the Eastern Mediterranean in 1992 as Regional Adviser for Noncommunicable Diseases. He subsequently served as WHO Representative in Oman and later as Director of the Division of Health Systems Development at the Regional office. In 1998, when Gro Harlem Brundtland assumed office as Director General, he moved to WHO headquarters to serve as Director for Noncommunicable Diseases Prevention. In this role, he led the development of the Global Strategy for the Prevention and Control of Noncommunicable Diseases, endorsed by the World Health Assembly in 2000. He also directed the first global survey on national capacity for noncommunicable disease prevention and control, covering 167 countries. In 2001, Alwan became WHO Representative in Jordan.

Following his ministerial positions in Iraq, he returned to WHO headquarters in 2005 as Assistant Director General and Representative of the Director-General for Health Action in Crises. From 2008 to 2012, he was Assistant Director-General for Noncommunicable Diseases and Mental Health, where he led the work that culminated in the adoption of the United Nations General Assembly Political Declaration on the Prevention and Control of Noncommunicable Diseases, at the 66th Session of the General Assembly in 2011.

In January 2012, the WHO Executive Board appointed Alwan as Regional Director for the Eastern Mediterranean following his election for this position by countries of the Eastern Mediterranean Region. He assumed office on 1 February 2012 for a five-year term. As Regional Director, Alwan established five regional priorities, covering health-system strengthening, maternal and child health, noncommunicable diseases, communicable diseases, health security, and emergency preparedness and response. In recognition of his contribution, the Regional Committee for the Eastern Mediterranean and the WHO Executive Board designated Alwan Regional Director Emeritus in 2016. The WHO publication: Five Years in Action: Strengthening Public Health in the Region and Beyond outlines the achievements made during his term of office.

== Academic engagements and the Disease Control Priorities Project ==
Following the end of his WHO term in 2017, Alwan joined the Disease Control Priorities 3 (DCP3) team as Professor of Global Health at the University of Washington, later becoming its Principal Investigator. DCP3 is a multi-year project funded by the Gates Foundation, which promotes the use of economic evaluation for priority setting in health decision-making. Between 2017 and 2018, the main contribution centered on the use of DCP3 evidence in developing model packages of essential health services for low- and lower-middle-income countries (LLMICs). Two model packages were developed, one for lower middle-income countries and the second for low-income countries, to support prioritisation of high-impact health services in the context of constrained health budgets.

At the conclusion of the project, Alwan became the Principal Investigator for a new DCP3 Country Translation initiative, which provided technical assistance to pilot LLMICs in support of their efforts to achieve universal health coverage. In 2019, Alwan moved to the London School of Hygiene & Tropical Medicine (LSHTM) as Professor of the Practice of Global Health, where the initiative was hosted. The project reviewed experience across a range of LLMICs and worked directly with pilot countries, including Pakistan, Liberia, and Bangladesh, to build local capacity in priority setting, evidence-based decision making, and the development of affordable and feasibly implemented packages of health services. Alwan is also the lead editor of Volume 1 of the Disease Control Priorities 4, launched by the World Bank in 2025.

In 2025, he became Visiting Professor of Global Health at the University of Oxford.

== Other activities ==
Alwan has held a number of advisory and committee roles. He was a member of WHO’s Independent High-level Commission on Noncommunicable Diseases and of the Global Polio Eradication Initiative’s Independent Monitoring Board. He has also served on the council of the World Health Summit, and on the Lancet–O’Neill Institute, Georgetown University Commission on Global Health and Law.

== Publications ==
Alwan has authored and co-authored more than 100 scientific papers and editorials, published in national, regional and international journals. Most publications are included in his ORCID and Google Scholar profiles.

Preceded by Coalition Provisional Authority	Minister of Health; September 2003–June 2004	Succeeded by Sami Mudahfar
Preceded by Khodayyir Abbas	Minister of Health; June 2004–May 2005	Succeeded by Abdel Muttalib Mohammed Ali
Preceded by Adela Humood Alaboudi	Minister of Health and environment October 2018–15 September 2019	Succeeded by Jaffar Allawi
