= Ahmed al-Barak =

Iraqi politician

Ahmed Shya'a al-Barak (sometimes spelled Ahmad) was a member of the Interim Iraq Governing Council, created following the United States's 2003 invasion of Iraq and dissolved in June 2004. A Shia Muslim from the city of Babylon, al-Barak is a lawyer and coordinator for the Iraqi Bar Association. As a human rights activist, al-Barak worked in the Iraqi Foreign Ministry in cooperation with United Nations from 1991 to 2003.
