= Ziad Abderrazzak Mohammad Aswad =

Iraqi politician

Ziad Abdulrazzaq Mohammed Aswad (born July 27, 1952) is a Professor of Petroleum Engineering. He was Minister of Higher Education in the cabinet appointed by the Interim Iraq Governing Council in September 2003. He is a Sunni Muslim, and not associated with any political party, and formerly chaired Baghdad University's Department of petroleum engineering. He holds MSc degree in Petroleum Engineering (Well Testing) from the University of Southern California (United States) in 1976, and PhD degree in Petroleum Engineering (Optimization Techniques) from the University of Oklahoma (United States) in 1980. He worked with the University of Baghdad (Iraq) from 1980–2003, and with the University of Bahrain from 2004–2015. He retired in September 2015, and worked as private consulting / visiting Professor. His area of interest are; Multi-Phase Flow Through Pipes, Rheological Properties of Non-Newtonian Fluids, Enhanced Oil Recovery Methods, and Application of Optimization techniques.

| Preceded by Coalition Provisional Authority | Minister of Higher Education; September 2003 – June 2004 | Succeeded by Tahir al-Bakaa |
