= Adela Humood Alaboudi =

Iraqi politician (born 1967)

- عديلة حمود العبودي

Minister of Health
- In office 8 September 2014 – 24 October 2018
- President: Haider al-Abadi
- Preceded by: Majeed Hamad Ameen
- Succeeded by: Alaa Abdessaheb al-Alwan

Personal details
- Born: Adela Humood Hussein Alaboudi; 1 July 1967 (age 59) Maysan Governorate, Iraq
- Party: Islamic Dawa Party

Adela Humood Hussein Alaboudi (Note: Arabic: عديلة حمود حسين العبودي) (born 1 July 1967) is an Iraqi politician. She served as the Iraqi Minister of Health from 2014 to 2018.
