= Ezzedine Salim =

71st prime minister of Iraq

- عز الدين سليم
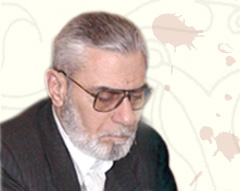

President of the Governing Council of Iraq
- In office 1 May 2004 – 17 May 2004
- Preceded by: Masoud Barzani
- Succeeded by: Ghazi Mashal Ajil al-Yawer

Personal details
- Born: 23 March 1943 Basra, Iraq
- Died: 17 May 2004 (aged 61) Baghdad, Iraq
- Party: Islamic Dawa Party

Ezzedine Salim (Arabic: عز الدين سليم), also known as Abdelzahra Othman Mohammed (23 March 1943 – 17 May 2004, عبد الزهراء عثمان محمد), was an Iraqi politician, author, educator, Islamist theorist and one of the leading members of the Iraqi Dawa Movement between 1980 and 2004. He served as the President of the Governing Council of Iraq (45th Prime Minister of Iraq) for sixteen days in 2004.

Author of over 50 books, including history, Islamic events and works on education, he is best known in the Muslim world for his work on what he believed to be the social and political role of Islam, particularly in his book Political Opposition in the experience of Imam Ali. His magnum opus, Fatima Bint Muhammad, is a high calibre commentary on the life of Fatima, the daughter of Islamic prophet, Muhammad.

== Biography ==
Born in the city of Basra, Salim began studying religion and politics at a young age. At the age of 19 he joined the Shiite group Islamic Dawa Party, whose members were quickly noticed by the Baath Party as a threat to their power. He left Iraq in his early twenties to go and live in Kuwait.

After a short time in Kuwait, he went to Iran where he began his career as an editor in many newspapers as well as his main job in the SCIRI (Supreme Council for the Islamic Revolution in Iraq). During his stay in Iran, he gained recognition as a Mujtahid (a high-ranking Islamic scholar). He wrote over 100 books covering topics ranging from religion to politics.

Salim headed the Daawa al-Islamiyah ("Invitation to Islam") party, an Islamist party officially being referred to (in 2004) as Daawa Islamic Party. Known as a writer, philosopher, thinker and political activist, he started his political party as a vehicle to coordinate opposition against Saddam Hussein. The party was quickly recognized as a strong anti-Saddam group. It gained many supporters over the years, and became respected not only in Iraq, Iran and the Middle East but throughout the world. Salim survived numerous assassination attempts by Saddam's followers, and deliberately changed his name to avoid being tracked.

In July 2003, Salim was given a position on the Iraqi Governing Council by the U.S.-led Coalition Provisional Authority, where he was serving as a crucial member. At a "town hall" meeting with press and public on 25 April 2004 he was asked whether Iraq could retain its identity as an Arab nation under a democracy. Ezzedine Salim responded, “Iraq is a member of the Arab League, but all are represented here now, including Turkmen, Kurds and Christians for example. Iraq is full of diversity.”

He became president of the Council on 1 May 2004. Ezzedine Salim was to serve as Council President until the formal handover of power to a new government on 30 June. However, he was killed by a suicide car bomb near the Green Zone on 17 May 2004. Jama'at al-Tawhid wal-Jihad claimed responsibility.

Political offices
Preceded by Massoud Barzani	President of the Governing Council of Iraq; 2004	Succeeded by Ghazi Mashal Ajil al-Yawer
