= Samir Sumaidaie =

Iraqi politician

Ambassador Samir Sumaidaie
- سمير الصميدعي
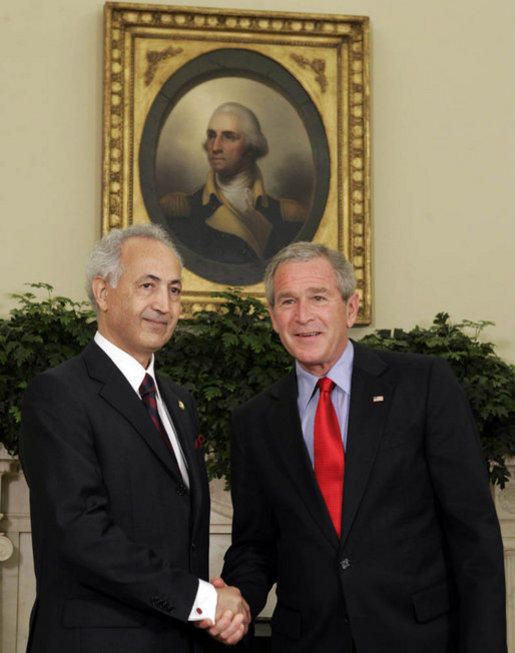
- Ambassador Sumaidaie meeting US President George W. Bush.

Iraqi Ambassador to the United States
- In office April 2006 – 19 December 2011
- Succeeded by: T. Hamid al Bayati

Iraq's Permanent Representative to the United Nations
- In office August 2004 – April 2006

Member of the Governing Council
- In office July 2003 – 28 June 2004
- Preceded by: Council created
- Succeeded by: Council dissolved

Personal details
- Born: 1944 (age 81–82) Baghdad, Iraq
- Education: Durham University
- Profession: Diplomat, Politician

Samir Shakir Mahmoud Sumayda'ie (Samir Sumaidaie) is an Iraqi politician who served as the Iraqi ambassador to the United States. He was born in Baghdad in 1944 and left Iraq in 1960 to study in the United Kingdom where he obtained a degree in electrical engineering from Durham University in 1965 and a postgraduate diploma in 1966. He returned to Iraq in 1966 but left again for the UK in 1973 after Saddam Hussein seized power. He returned to Baghdad and was appointed member of the Iraq Governing Council in July 2003. He was appointed Iraq's Ambassador to the United States in April 2006, after previously serving as the Iraq's Permanent Representative to the United Nations (from August 2004), and prior to that, as Baghdad's Interior Minister. He is secular and rejects any sectarian label.

During his years of exile, based in London, and traveling in the Mid- and Far- East, He was a leading figure in the opposition to Saddam's regime and helped form a number of political groups.

In July 2005 Sumaidaie demanded an inquiry into the fatal shooting (which he has described as "cold-blooded") of his cousin during a routine house to house search by US Marines in Iraq.

In November 2007 he visited The Fletcher School at Tufts University where he gave a speech on the history and current situation in Iraq.

In March 2010 he visited the renowned Elliott School of International Affairs at The George Washington University.

Political offices
Preceded by Nuri al-Badran	Iraqi Minister of Interior; April 2004–June 2004	Succeeded by Falah Hassan al-Naqib
