= Mohamed Ali Alhakim =

Iraqi politician and diplomat

His Excellency Mohamed Ali Alhakim
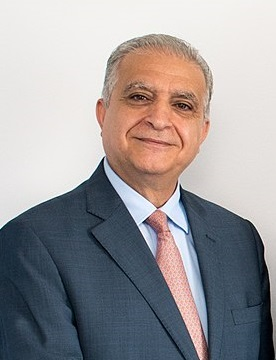

Minister of Foreign Affairs
- In office 25 October 2018 – 12 May 2020
- Prime Minister: Adil Abdul-Mahdi
- Preceded by: Ibrahim al-Jaafari
- Succeeded by: Fuad Hussein

Permanent Representative of Iraq to the United Nations
- In office 3 May 2013 – 25 October 2018
- President: Jalal Talabani; Fuad Masum
- Prime Minister: Nouri al-Maliki; Haider al-Abadi
- Preceded by: T. Hamid al Bayati
- Succeeded by: Mohammed Hussein Bahr al-Uloom

Permanent Representative of Iraq to United Nations Office in Geneva
- In office 2010–2013
- President: Jalal Talabani
- Prime Minister: Nouri al-Maliki
- Succeeded by: Mohammad Sabir Ismail

Personal details
- Born: 1952 (age 73–74) Najaf, Iraq

Dr. Mohamed Ali Alhakim (Arabic: محمد علي الحكيم; born 1952 in Najaf, Iraq) is an Iraqi politician and diplomat. He was the foreign minister of Iraq from October 25, 2018, to May 12, 2020, in the government of Prime Minister Adel Abdel Mahdi. He is the former Permanent Representative of Iraq to the United Nations Office at Geneva and New York.

== Career ==
He was appointed as Under Secretary General of United Nations (USG) and Executive Secretary of Economic and Social Commission for Western Asia by United Nations Secretary-General António Guterres on 13 April 2017. Was former Foreign Minister of Iraq, major participant in extensive government decisions, overseeing bilateral and multilateral relationships, active in mediation and negotiation with deep knowledge of Iraq, Iraq’s neighbors, Arab countries, Arab league, and UN infrastructure, derived government foreign policy with neighboring countries, negotiated with policy makers bilateral and regional issues.

He established strong ties with Arab countries including Kuwait, Jordan, Turkey, Saudi Arabia, and Iran and worked closely with the government of Syria on common matters.

Strengthened political and economic engagements with EU countries and NATO, established strong partnerships with US policy makers, and was instrumental in working with the anti-ISIS coalition countries on security and anti-terrorism, and strengthened political economic relations with Russia, China, Japan, Canada, South Korea, India and others.

Established continuous communication with counterparts of Arab-league members, non-aligned, OIC, and EU countries.

=== Working in Iraq ===
Former Iraq foreign minister (October 25, 2018 – May 12, 2020), with a team of 4 deputies, 88 ambassadors and councilors and approximately 3000 staff. Chaired the Arab Foreign Ministers Council in the Arab League from September 2019 to March 2020.

Served from 2010–2017, as Ambassador and Permanent Representative to the United Nations in Geneva and New York.

Served from 2006–2010, as Ambassador and director of the Arab, European, international organizations and policy planning departments in Iraq’s Foreign ministry.

Served from 2005–2006, as elected member of the Iraq’s National Assembly (Parliament), and member of the foreign relation committee.

Served from 2004–2005, as Cabinet Minister of Communications and Acting Minister of Finance.

Served from 2003–2004, as Deputy Secretary-General of Iraq’s Governing Council.

=== Working with United Nations ===
On April 13, 2017, was appointed by UNSG Mr. Antonio Guterres to serve as undersecretary (USG) and Executive Secretary of the Western Asia Economic and Social Commission ESCWA based in Beirut, Lebanon.

Developed programs for 18 Arab countries, partnered with Arab-league, GCC and OIC organizations, Arab Islamic bank, World Bank, coordinated with regional UN agencies and country coordinators on implementing 2030 agenda on cultural heritage, water resources, climate change, human rights, women’s issues, gender equality, mediation, counter-terrorism and conflict prevention with special projects for countries in conflicts such as Syria, Libya, and Yemen.

=== Working with Donors and partnerships ===
Established strong Partnership with regional and international governments, organizations, UN, NGOs, and institutions to assist Iraq in humanitarian, reconstruction, training, demining, women issues and community rebuilding in liberated Iraqi cities from ISIS.

=== Meetings and conferences ===
Key-note speaker, chaired meetings, conferences, and lead Iraqi delegations to number of regional and international conferences and spoken in many UN, think-tanks and world events include World Economic Forum, Munich Security, NATO, EU, Climate Changes and others.

=== Education and academic ===
- High school – science, Baghdad, Iraq
- BA – education and statistics, University of Baghdad, Iraq
- Master of Science, University of Birmingham, UK
- Doctorate in Management of Engineering, University of Southern California, USA
