= Iraqi Transitional Government =

2005–2006 government of Iraq

- Cabinet of Iraq

- Date formed: 3 May 2005
- Date dissolved: 20 May 2006

People and organisations
- Head of government: Ibrahim al-Jaafari
- Status in legislature: Coalition

The Iraqi Transitional Government was the government of Iraq from May 3, 2005, when it replaced the Iraqi Interim Government, until May 20, 2006, when it was replaced by a permanent government.

On April 28 it was approved by the transitional Iraqi National Assembly, which had been elected in January 2005. It operated under the Law of Administration for the State of Iraq for the Transitional Period, and its main functions were to draft a permanent Constitution of Iraq and to form a transitional government.

== Organization ==
=== Executive ===
Although the President is the chief of military and head of state, the Prime Minister is the head of government who exercises most executive powers. The President and both deputies (collective the Presidency Council of Iraq) are elected by the Assembly with a two-thirds majority. They then propose the Prime Minister from the largest party, who must also be approved by a two-thirds majority; the Prime Minister then proposes the Council of Ministers, who must be approved with a two-thirds majority.

The current Council of Ministers was sworn in on May 3 but several key posts were left vacant. Six new ministers were approved to fill vacant positions on 8 May, one of whom rejected his position saying he had not been consulted.

Position	
President	Jalal Talabani
Vice Presidents	Adil Abdul Mahdi; Ghazi al-Yawer
Prime Minister	Ibrahim al Jaafari
Deputy Prime Ministers	Ahmed Chalabi; Ruz Nuri Shawis; Abid Mutlak al-Jubouri (vacant)
Interior Minister	Bayan Baqir Solagh
Foreign Minister	Hoshyar Zebari
Defence Minister	Saadoun al-Dulaimi
Oil Minister	Ibrahim Bahr al-Uloum
Electricity Minister	Mohsen Shlash
Minister of Planning and Development Co-operation	Barham Salih
Higher Education Minister	Sami al-Mudhaffar
Minister of Municipalities and Public Works	Nisrin Barwari
Telecommunications Minister	Juwan Fouad Masum
Finance Minister	Ali Abdul-Amir Allawi
Minister of Water Resources	Abdul-Latif Rashid
Minister of Environment	Narmin Othman
Trade Minister	Abdel-Karim Mahoud al-Mohammedawi
Transport Minister	Salam al-Maliki
Minister of Labour and Social Affairs	Idris Hadi
Human Rights Minister	Narmin Othman (acting); Hashim al-Shible rejected the post after he had been approved by parliament
Health Minister	Abdel Muttalib Mohammed Ali
Minister of Construction and Housing	Jasim Mohammed Jaafar
Education Minister	Abdel Falah Hassan
Agriculture Minister	Ali al-Bahadili
Justice Minister	Abdel Hussein Shandal
Culture Minister	Nuri Farhan al-Rawi
Minister of Science and Technology	Basimah Yusuf Butrus
Minister of Displacement and Migration	Suhaylah Abd-Jaafar
Minister of Youth and Sports	Talib Aziz Zayni
Minister of Industry	Usama al-Najafi
Minister of State for National Security Affairs	Abdul Karim al-Anizi
Minister of State for Governorate Affairs	Saad Nayif Mujhim al-Hardan
Minister of State for Civil Society Affairs	Ala Habib Kazim
Minister of State for Women's Affairs	Azhar Abdel Karim al-Shaikhli
Minister of State for Tourism and Antiquities	Hashim al-Hashimi
Minister of State for National Assembly Affairs	Safa al-Din Mohammed al-Safi

=== Legislative ===
- President of National Assembly Hajim al-Hassani
  - Deputy President Hussain al-Shahristani
  - Deputy President Aref Taifour
    - National Assembly

=== Judicial ===
- Higher Judicial Council
  - Federal Supreme Court
    - Court of Cassation
    - Courts of Appeal
    - Central Criminal Court

Preceded by Iraqi Interim Government	Government of Iraq; May 3, 2005 - May 20, 2006	Succeeded by Al Maliki I Government
