= Falah Hassan al-Naqib =

Iraqi politician

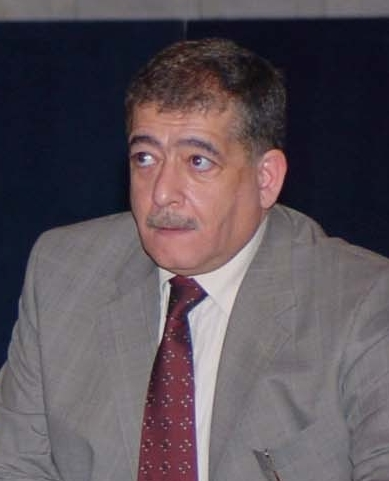
Naqib in 2004.

Falah Hassan al-Naqib (Arabic: فلاح حسن النقيب) is an Iraqi politician and was the Minister of Interior under the Iraqi Interim Government.

== Biography ==
Born in 1956 in Samarra, he is a Sunni Arab. He trained in the United States as a civil engineer. His father, General Hassan al-Naqib, defected in the 1970s and became an active opposition member in exile.

An ally of Interim Prime Minister Iyad Allawi, he was named the governor of Salah ad Din Governorate after the fall of Saddam Hussein, then he became the Minister of Interior, from 2004 to 2005.

Political offices
Preceded by Samir Sumaidaie	Iraqi Minister of Interior; June 2004–April 2005	Succeeded by Bayan Jabr
