= Djiboutian nationality law =

Djiboutian National Assembly
- Long title: Code Civil (Loi No. 003/AN/18/8eme/L), Titre II: De la nationalité, Articles 26–64
- Enacted by: Government of Djibouti
- Status: Current legislation

Djiboutian nationality law is regulated by the Constitution of Djibouti, as amended; the Djiboutian Nationality Code, and its revisions; and various international agreements to which the country is a signatory. These laws determine who is, or is eligible to be, a national of Djibouti. The legal means to acquire nationality, formal legal membership in a nation, differ from the domestic relationship of rights and obligations between a national and the nation, known as citizenship. Djiboutian nationality is typically obtained under the principle of jus soli, i.e. by birth in Djibouti, or jus sanguinis, born abroad to parents with Djiboutian nationality. It can be granted to persons with an affiliation to the country, or to a permanent resident who has lived in the country for a given period of time through naturalization.

== Acquisition of nationality ==
Nationality can be acquired in Djibouti at birth or later in life through naturalization.

=== By birth ===
Those who acquire nationality at birth include:

- Children born anywhere who have at least one parent who is a Djiboutian national by birth; or
- Abandoned children or orphans discovered in the territory whose parents are unknown.

=== By naturalization ===
Naturalization can be granted to persons who have resided in the territory for a sufficient period of time to confirm they understand the language, customs and traditions of the society. General provisions are that applicants have good character and conduct; have no convictions that resulted in a sentence of six months or more; have good health; and have resided in the country for ten years. Besides foreigners meeting the criteria, other persons who may be naturalized include:

- The spouse(s) of a Djiboutian national after ten years of marriage, or five years if the couple have children; (Note: Under the Djiboutian Family Code, polygamy is legal and all spouses have equal right to gain nationality through naturalization.)
- Adopted children of Djiboutian nationals;
- Minor children can be automatically naturalized when their parent acquires nationality; or
- Persons who have performed exceptional services to the nation can be naturalized after meeting a residency requirement of five years.

== Loss of nationality ==
Djiboutian nationals can renounce their nationality pending approval by the state. (Note: British academic, Bronwyn Manby concluded that there are no provisions for renunciation of Djiboutian nationality. The United States Office of Personnel Management Investigation Services states that it was allowed under the 1981 Nationality Law, which Manby advises is still in effect unless it contravenes provisions of the 2004 law.) Nationals may be denaturalized in Djibouti for failure to perform military obligations; performing actions indicating one is a national of another state; serving in the government or military of another state without the authorization of the government of Djibouti; committing serious crimes, disloyal acts, or crimes against the state; or for fraud, misrepresentation, or concealment in a naturalization petition.

== Dual nationality ==
Dual nationality is typically allowed in Djibouti since 2004. However, the president of the country is not allowed to have nationality other than Djiboutian.

== History ==
=== African sultanates (1517–1883) ===
For centuries, the area along the coast of the Horn of Africa was dominated by feuding from the larger Christian Kingdom of Abyssinia, modern Ethiopia, and the Muslim Ottoman Empire. From 1517, the inhabitants were subjects of the Egyptian province of the Ottomans. By the seventeenth century, three small Muslim states, the Sultanates of Gobaad, Rahayta, and Tadjoura had emerged in the area, but continued to struggle for their autonomy from Abyssinian rulers, as they were important links in the trade routes to Shewa. Within the Ottoman Empire, for six centuries, there was an internal organization that defined government functions for subjects by balancing religious and communal ties, weighing aptitudes and occupations without a centralized national ideology. Ottoman subjecthood was strongly tied to religion and non-Muslims, if they were ahl al-Kitāb (People of the Book), meaning Jewish, Christian, or Zoroastrian, could benefit from being subjects by agreeing to pay a tax to the sultan. Under a pact known as zimma, in exchange for paying taxes, the sultan allowed these subjects freedom of religion and guaranteed their lives, property, and rights with an understanding that they were legally entitled to less status than Muslim subjects. The pact was agreed to by the leaders of the confessional community, who managed the adherents and their internal organization under the religious law of their community.

By the eighteenth century a political organization, known as the millet, managed the affairs of their respective religious communities and developed into the protégé system (Turkish: beratlılar, protected persons). Signing treaties with European powers, from the 1673 signing of a Capitulation with France, the Ottoman Empire granted France control of certain Ottoman Christians, Austria control of some Ottoman Roman Catholics, most favoured nation status to British and Dutch traders, as well as specific rights to the Republic of Venice and Russian Empire. Under the terms of these treaties, foreign powers could recruit Ottoman subjects to serve their needs as commercial agents, consuls, or interpreters, and extend to these protégés diplomatic immunity from prosecution and privileges of trade, including lowered customs tariffs. Over time, abuses of the system led to a virtual monopoly of foreign trade by protégés, clandestine sales of letters patent (Turkish: berats), and demands from foreign powers for protection to extend from individuals to entire communities. The influence on Ottoman subjects by European powers changed the perception of these minority groups in the empire, meaning that they were increasingly seen not as Ottoman subjects, but as resident aliens.

In 1798, France and Britain's conflicts during the Napoleonic Wars extended into Egypt. France occupied the territory until 1801, when the French were defeated and Britain set about assisting the Ottoman Empire in regaining its sovereignty. To curb the disruptive effects of Europeans in the empire, from 1806, the Ottoman government began sending communiques to the foreign embassies demanding compliance with the terms of their agreements. Failing to achieve success diplomatically, in 1839, the Ottoman government issued the Edict of Gülhane, in an effort to end bribery and corruption, and to create fair tax schemes and institutions to protect the basic rights of Ottoman subjects. In 1838 the British acquired the port of Aden in Yemen, sparking the French to begin searching for a rival harbor along the Gulf of Tadjoura. The Ottoman Reform Edict of 1856 (Turkish: Islâhat Fermânı) categorized subjects by whether they were Muslim or non-Muslim, granting different civil statuses to each. In 1863, new regulations upon protégés restricted the privileges they received in the empire and clarifying who were thereafter considered to be Ottoman subjects and who were foreigners. In 1862, France signed a treaty with Diny Ahmet Abou-Bekr, Sultan of Rahayta to acquire Obock to establish a protectorate and gain a foothold in the region. They paid the sultan 55,000 francs, but only occasionally used the port when en route to other possessions.

When the Khedivate of Egypt was established in 1867, France was content to allow the autonomous state within the Ottoman Empire to continue maintaining authority, as long as it recognized that the French had an interest in the region. A need to further define subjects of the Ottoman Empire, led to nationality legislation and the passage of the 1869 Ottoman Nationality Law (tâbiiyet-i osmaniye kanunnamesi). (Note: Will Hanley, a history professor at Florida State University, notes that the etymology of tâbiiyet includes associations with allegiance, nationality, and subjecthood, or an affiliation to a sovereign, but does not translate as citizenship.) The law specified terms for the acquisition and loss of who was within the sovereignty of the empire, rather than the domestic obligations and rights of citizenship. It described who was a subject, owing allegiance, and made provisions for wives, children, emigrants and immigrants. Under its terms, children derived nationality from their fathers, foreigners born in the territory could acquire nationality at majority, and foreigners born elsewhere could obtain nationality after five years residency within the imperial realm. Specific provisions included that foundlings discovered within the territory; stateless persons living in the empire; Muslim women, who despite the ban on such marriages, had married Persian men and the children of such a union; unregistered persons who had not been counted in the Ottoman census, either because no census was taken or their births were unregistered, were all considered to be Ottoman. Foreign women acquired Ottoman nationality through marriage, but could return to their original nationality upon the death of their spouse. Nationality could also be granted based on special contribution or service to the nation. Dual nationality was permitted, but was discouraged, as the government could choose not to recognize naturalization of an Ottoman subject by another state.

Egyptian expansion into French territory with the construction of forts near Obock in 1881 and in the Latela Valley (French: Vallée de Latéla) in 1883 was initially met with diplomacy by the French. But in December 1883, permission was granted for colonization efforts in the area by the coal company Société Française des Steamers de l'Ouest (French Society of Western Steamers). Léonce Lagarde was appointed to serve as the colonial governor of Obock. He began to secure treaties to acquire additional territory along the Somali Coast.

=== French colonial period (1884–1977) ===
In 1884 France signed treaties in May and December to acquire territory and establish protectorates for Gobaad and Tadjoura. In 1888, Lagarde founded Djibouti City. The Obock and Tadjoura protectorates were merged in 1896 to form French Somaliland and Djibouti City became its capital. Slavery was abolished throughout the French Empire and the Civil Code was extended to all of the French citizens in the colonies in 1848. Under the Civil Code, women were legally incapacitated and paternal authority was established over their children. Upon marriage, a woman married to a French man automatically acquired the same nationality as her spouse. Illegitimate children were barred from inheritance and nationality could only be transmitted through a father. The French Nationality Law of 1889 codified previous statutory laws, changing the French standard from jus sanguinis to jus soli and was extended to the French West Indies. Under its terms, women who would become stateless by the rule to acquire their spouse's nationality were allowed to retain their French nationality upon marriage. The Nationality Law was modified in 1897 when it was extended to the remainder of the French colonies. Clarification in the 1897 decree included that bestowing nationality by birth in French territory only applied to children born in France, restoring descent requirements for the colonies. Between 1897 and 1917 a large number of migrants from Yemen were brought in to work on the construction of the rail line from Djibouti to Addis Ababa.

Under the Code de l'indigénat (Code of Indigenous Status) promulgated for Algeria in 1881 and extended to French Somaliland in 1912, nationals in the new colonies followed customary law for their internal governance. Non-citizen nationals were governed by traditional laws concerning marriage and inheritance which placed the well-being of the community above individual rights. These laws prevented a wife from being treated as a slave, required her husband to support her, and entitled her kin to a bride price, to compensate them for the loss of her fertility to their kinship group and secure the legality of the union. Having paid the price for the marriage contract, she and her offspring belonged to the kinship network of her husband and could be inherited if her husband died. In 1927, France passed a new Nationality Law, which under Article 8, removed the requirement for married women to automatically derive the nationality of a husband and provided that her nationality could only be changed if she consented to change her nationality. It also allowed children born in France to native-born French women married to foreigners to acquire their nationality from their mothers. When it was implemented it included Guadeloupe, Martinique and Réunion but was extended to the remaining French possessions for French citizens only in 1928. Under Article 26 of the 1928 decree was the stipulation that it did not apply to natives of the French possessions except in Algeria, Guadeloupe, Martinique, and Réunion. A decade later, the legal incapacity of married women was finally invalidated for French citizens.

At the end of World War II, a statute issued on 7 March 1944 granted French citizenship to those who had performed services to the nation, such as serving as civil servants or receiving recognitions. The Constitution of 1946 granted French citizenship to all subjects of France's territories without having to renounce their personal status as natives. Under its terms, French Somaliland was classified as an Overseas Territory within the French Union. In 1945, a new Code of French Nationality was passed, which conferred once again automatic French nationality on foreign wives of French men, but allowed mothers who were French nationals to pass their nationality to children born outside of France. It expressly applied to Algeria, French Guiana, Guadeloupe, Martinique and Réunion and was extended to the Overseas Territories in 1953, but in the case of the latter had distinctions for the rights of those who were naturalized.

With the passage of the 1958 French Constitution, nationality provisions were standardized for France, Overseas Departments, and Overseas Territories. Article 86 excluded the possibility for independence of the colonies. In 1958, a constitutional referendum was held for French Somaliland, with inhabitants voting to remain within the French Community. The French Constitution was amended in 1960 to allow states to maintain membership in the Community even if they were independent republics. A second plebiscite was held on 19 March 1967, with 60% of the voters remaining against independence from France. On 3 July, French Somaliland was renamed as the Territory of the Afars and Issas and was granted greater autonomy over its internal affairs. Yemeni migrants were granted French nationality with full political rights under a statute of 1967. Beginning in 1970, armed conflict led by the Front for the Liberation of the Somali Coast (French: Front de Libération de la Côte des Somalis) broke out. Defense of the territory became a key issue for the French government from 1974. In 1975 the press for independence was accompanied by politically motivated violence. On 31 December 1975, communiqué from Paris indicated a willingness to accede to independence. In October 1976, a committee met to determine who would be able to acquire identity cards in the new nation. Those who were to be included were inhabitants and their families who fought for independence, retired military personnel who had served for at least ten years, and foreigners who were married to Djiboutians. A third referendum on independence was held on 8 May 1977, resulting in approval by over 94% of the voters.

=== Post-independence (1977–present) ===
The Republic of Djibouti was established on 27 June 1977. In 1981, the Djiboutian Nationality Law provided that anyone who had formerly been a French national at independence was considered to be Djiboutian, as long as they were assimilated into a community which had traditionally been part of the territory. It stipulated that children of two Djiboutian parents derived nationality through their parents and provided a pathway for orphans to acquire nationality. Illegitimate children could derive nationality from their mother if the father was unknown, but the law did not recognize persons as Djiboutian if one of the parents was a foreigner. Under Article 12, wives of persons who became Djiboutian nationals at independence were automatically made Djiboutian, regardless of what their former French status might have been. After independence, persons marrying a Djiboutian national could naturalize after two years per Article 21. Besides omitting people who were born in the territory and had never lived anywhere else but whose parents were foreign, the 1981 Law stated in Article 13 that persons who had served in the military or security forces of Djibouti prior to independence was granted nationality, regardless of whether they had any other tie to the country.

In 2004, the Nationality Code (Loi N°. 200/A.N./1981) was revised, providing equal access for children to acquire nationality through either parent and equality for any spouse to derive their nationality upon having been married for ten years. In the case that children were born of the marriage, the length of marriage only needed to be five years. The 2004 revision also legalized dual nationality. In 2018, the Nationality Code was incorporated as Articles 26–64 of the new Civil Code of Djibouti (Loi N°. 003/AN/18/8eme/L).
