= Ibrahim al-Jaafari =

Prime Minister of Iraq from 2005 to 2006

Ibrahim al-Ja'fari
- إبراهيم الجعفري
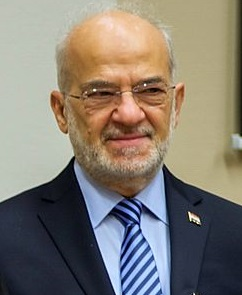
- Al-Ja'fari in 2014

Prime Minister of Iraq
- In office 3 May 2005 – 20 May 2006
- President: Jalal Talabani
- Deputy: See list: Rowsch Shaways Ahmed Chalabi Abid Mutlak al-Jubouri
- Preceded by: Ayad Allawi
- Succeeded by: Nouri al-Maliki

Interim Vice President of Iraq
- In office June 1, 2004 – April 7, 2005 Serving with Rowsch Shaways
- President: Ghazi al-Yawer (interim)
- Preceded by: Taha Yassin Ramadan
- Succeeded by: Ghazi al-Yawer and Adil Abdul-Mahdi

Minister of Foreign Affairs
- In office 8 September 2014 – 25 October 2018
- Prime Minister: Haider al-Abadi
- Preceded by: Hussain al-Shahristani (acting)
- Succeeded by: Mohamed Ali Alhakim

President of the Governing Council of Iraq
- In office 1 August 2003 – 31 August 2003
- Leader: Paul Bremer
- Preceded by: Mohammad Bahr al-Ulloum (Acting)
- Succeeded by: Ahmed Chalabi

Personal details
- Born: Ibrahim Abd al-Karim Hamza al-Eshaiker; 25 March 1947 (age 79) Karbala, Kingdom of Iraq
- Party: National Iraqi Alliance; National Reform Trend
- Children: 5
- Education: University of Mosul
- Profession: Physician
- Website: www.al-jaffaary.net

Ibrahim Abdul Karim al-Eshaiker (Arabic: إبراهيم عبد الكريم الأشيقر; born 25 March 1947), better known as Ibrahim al-Jaafari, is an Iraqi politician who was prime minister in the Iraqi Transitional Government from 2005 to 2006, following the January 2005 election. He served as minister of foreign affairs from 2014 to 2018.

He was one of the two vice presidents of Iraq under the Iraqi Interim Government from 2004 to 2005, and he was the main spokesman for the Islamic Dawa Party. He withdrew his nomination for premiership for the permanent government.

== Early life and education ==
He was born in Karbala to Shia parents Abd al-Karim al-Eshaiker and Rahmah al-Eshaiker on March 25, 1947. He hails from the noble Al Zheek family that claims descent from Ibrahim al-Asghar bin Musa al-Kadhim, the seventh Shia Imam. The family settled in Karbala in the early 11th-century. His great-grandfather, Mahdi bin Ali bin Baqir al-Eshaiker, led the al-Eshaiker revolt in Karbala in 1876 against the Ottomans in Iraq.

al-Jaafari was educated at Mosul university as a medical doctor. He moved with his family to Iran where he lived and worked with the Islamic Revolution Council of Iraq, an Iran backed Iraqi opposition until 1989. He then moved to London where he continued his political activities by eventually heading the Dawa Islamic Party.

== Member of Council of Representatives ==
He joined the Islamic Dawa Party in 1968. Upon graduation from school in 1974 he worked actively for the party in Iraq which was trying to overthrow the Ba'athist secular Sunni-dominated government. He left for Iran in 1980 and became involved in the movement against Saddam Hussein there as part of the Supreme Council for the Islamic Revolution in Iraq where he represented the Islamic Dawa Party. He adopted the name al-Jaafari in exile to protect his family in Iraq from retribution by Saddam. He moved to London in 1989 where he became the al-Dawa spokesman in the UK and an important participant in the wider anti-Saddam movement. While in the UK he attended many Iraqi Events giving religious sermons.

== Iraq War and the fall of Saddam Hussein ==
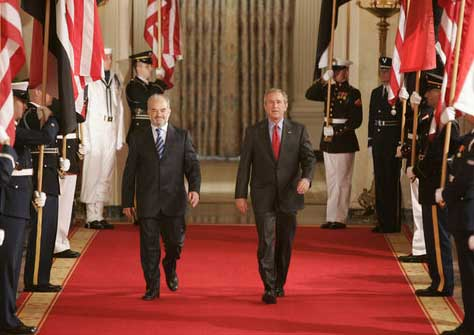
Jaafari with U.S. President George W. Bush, 24 June 2005

He opposed the 2003 invasion of Iraq but returned to Iraq soon after. He was picked in July 2003 as member of the U.S.-backed Iraqi Governing Council, and served as its first chairman and Iraq's first post-Saddam interim President for one month. On 1 June 2004, he was selected to be one of the two vice-presidents in the Iraqi Interim Government.

He brought al-Dawa into the United Iraqi Alliance coalition of Shi'ite parties and was second on the party's list after SCIRI leader Abdul Aziz al-Hakim.

== Elections ==
=== January 2005 elections ===
Following the January 2005 Iraqi elections the strength of the UIA in the parliament made him a likely candidate to become the nation's new Prime Minister. Only Ahmed Chalabi challenged him for the position. Chalabi later dropped out of the race, being less than a favourite for a majority of the parties in the UIA, partly tainted by several scandals, thus leaving al-Jaafari unchallenged to become the alliance's candidate for the post. He was designated as Prime Minister on 7 April 2005, following the election of a Presidency Council the day before. After a long period of negotiations aimed at establishing a broad-based government, he and his cabinet were finally approved by the National Assembly of Iraq on 28 April.

=== December 2005 elections ===
In the national election of December 2005, the UIA once again won the majority of the votes, which according to the new Iraqi constitution, gets to pick the Prime Minister. UIA members voted for the Prime Minister with only two main candidates. Al-Jaafari was one and the SCIRI member Adel Abdul Mahdi, an economist. Jaafari won the vote only by one (64–63). His win was credited to the support of Muqtada Al Sadr's members of UIA, who all voted for him.

Despite this win, however, he became increasingly associated with the failure to end the violence in Iraq and to improve services. Because of this, the Sunni, Kurdish and secular groups in the parliament refused to agree to him continuing as Prime Minister, leading to deadlock. His refusal to stand down began to alienate even those who had backed him up to that point, but it is believed that only when Ayatollah Ali al-Sistani intervened that he finally stepped down. The US government had expressed dissatisfaction with him in two months earlier, with George W. Bush stating that he "doesn't want, doesn't support, doesn't accept" his retention as Prime Minister.

He was succeeded by al-Maliki as Dawa Party secretary-general in May 2007.

== National Reform ==
In May 2008, al-Jaafari launched a new political party called the National Reform Trend. He was formally expelled from the Dawa party as a consequence, and his new party was widely seen as a vehicle for an attempt at regaining power.

== Appointment as Foreign Minister ==
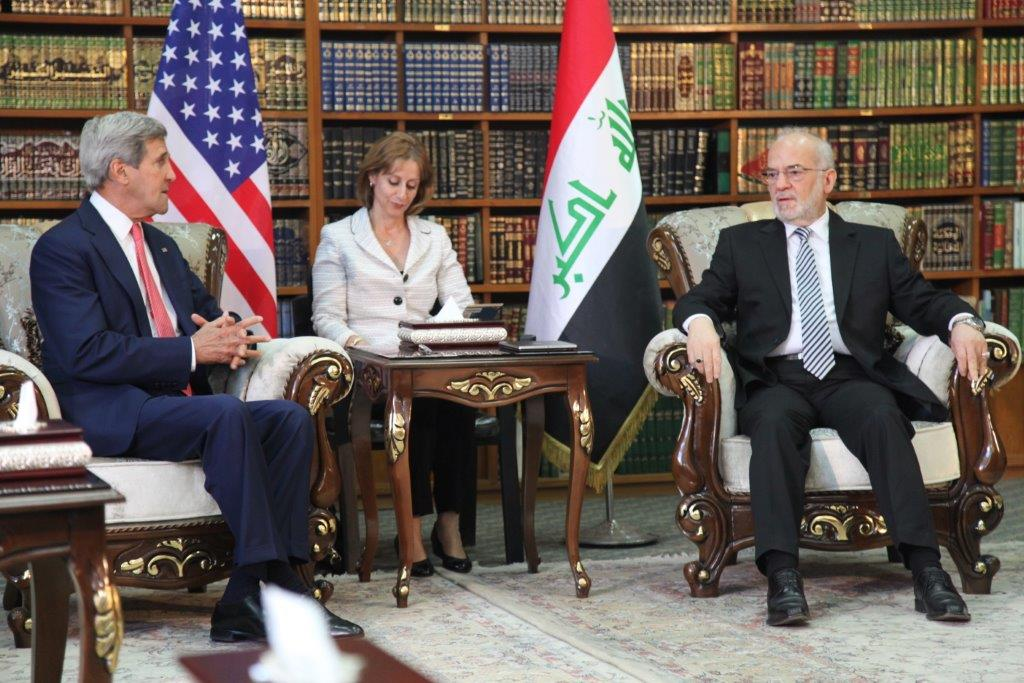
Al-Jaafari meeting with US Secretary of State John Kerry in Baghdad

He was appointed as Minister of Foreign Affairs by newly-elected Prime Minister Haider al-Abadi on 8 September 2014.

In February 2018, al-Jaafari condemned the Turkish invasion of northern Syria aimed at ousting U.S.-backed Syrian Kurds from the enclave of Afrin. He stated: "We reject any foreign nation from intervening in the affairs of another country."

== See also ==
- List of foreign ministers in 2017

Political offices
Preceded by Mohammad Bahr al-Ulloum; Acting	President of the Governing Council of Iraq; 2003	Succeeded by Ahmed Chalabi
Preceded by Ayad Allawi	Prime Minister of Iraq; 2005–2006	Succeeded by Nouri al-Maliki
Preceded by Hoshyar Zebari	Minister of Foreign Affairs of Iraq; 2014–2018	Succeeded by Mohamed Ali Alhakim
