= Ghazi Mashal Ajil al-Yawer =

72nd prime minister of Iraq

Ghazi Mashal Ajil al-Yawar
- غازي مشعل عجيل الياور
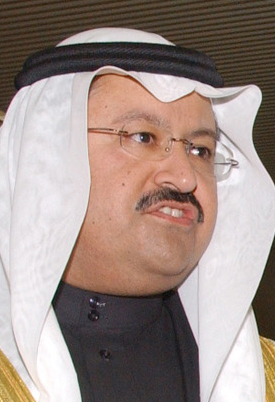
- Al-Yawar in 2005

Interim President of Iraq
- In office 28 June 2004 – 7 April 2005
- Prime Minister: Ayad Allawi
- Preceded by: Saddam Hussein (as President of Iraq); Paul Bremer (as Administrator of the Coalition Provisional Authority); Himself (as President of the Governing Council of Iraq)
- Succeeded by: Jalal Talabani

Vice President of Iraq
- In office 7 April 2005 – 22 April 2006 Serving with Adil Abdul-Mahdi
- President: Jalal Talabani
- Preceded by: Ibrahim al-Jaafari and Rowsch Shaways
- Succeeded by: Adil Abdul-Mahdi and Tariq al-Hashimi

President of the Governing Council of Iraq
- In office 17 May 2004 – 1 June 2004
- President: Paul Bremer
- Preceded by: Ezzedine Salim
- Succeeded by: Ayad Allawi (as Prime Minister of Iraq)

Personal details
- Born: 1958 (age 67–68) Mosul, Iraq
- Party: The Iraqis
- Education: King Fahd University of Petroleum and Minerals; American University; George Washington University

Ghazi Mashal Ajil al-Yawar (Arabic: غازي مشعل عجيل الياور, born 1958) is an Iraqi politician. He was the vice president under the Iraqi Transitional Government in 2006, and was interim president of Iraq under the Iraqi Interim Government from 2004 to 2005. He also served as the president of the Governing Council of Iraq in 2004 following the US-led coalition invasion.

Al-Yawar was originally a member of the Iraqi Governing Council created following the US-led 2003 invasion of Iraq. In 2004 he was appointed by the council to serve as interim President of Iraq following the 28 June return of Iraqi sovereignty from the Coalition Provisional Authority.

== Early life and education ==
Born in Mosul, Iraq in 1958, al-Yawar completed his primary and secondary education in Iraq. He then went on to study in King Fahd University for Petroleum and Minerals (KFUPM) for two years before completing his BSc in civil engineering in the UK. Al-Yawar enrolled in an English language program at American University in Washington, D.C., and then received his master's degree from George Washington University in the mid 1980s.

Al-Yawar is Sunni Muslim. The House of Yawar has been the head of the Shammar tribe for centuries. The Shammar is one of Iraq's biggest tribal confederations with more than 1.5 million people covering vast territories from Iraq into Syria and Saudi Arabia. Composed of both Sunnis and Shiites, the Shammar are generally religiously and politically moderate. "My mother would take me to visit the holy shrines in Najaf and Karbala, in addition to the Sunni mosques in Baghdad and St. Mary's Church," Yawar told the Iraqi paper Al Zaman. This had an impact on al-Yawar's leadership approach later in his political career, and one that made a lasting impression. According to Jaffar Saheb Said, an elder at the northern Baghdad shrine of Imam Kadhem, a Shiite saint, "he's deep-rooted and well-known among Arab clans. He's able to navigate between both Shias and Sunnis and solve their problems."

His uncle, Sheikh Mohsen Ajil al-Yawar, was the head of the Shammar tribe until his death in 2017 and his grandfather played a role in guiding Iraq towards independence in the 1920s, later serving as a member of the king's parliament. When al-Yawar's uncle refused to sanction Saddam Hussein's invasion of Kuwait in 1990 the family went into exile in London. Al-Yawar, who was then residing in Saudi Arabia, eschewed politics and instead established a successful telecommunications company. He spent much of the past two decades in Saudi Arabia, where he became vice president of a telecommunications company High Capabilities Co. (HiCap).

== Presidency ==
After the toppling of Saddam Hussein in April 2003, al-Yawar returned to Iraq at the request of his uncle, Mohsen al-Yawar. Following the assassination of Iraqi Governing Council President Ezzedine Salim on 17 May 2004, Ghazi al-Yawar assumed the May rotating presidency for the Governing Council. During his term as interim president, leading up to the dissolution of the Governing Council, al-Yawar spoke out against the misperception that Arab Sunnis in Iraq enjoyed huge privileges under Saddam Hussein's rule. Al-Yawar adamantly affirmed that "Saddam did not believe in any religion or sect – his injustices were inflicted on Sunnis, Shi'is, Kurds and all other national groups and sects. He did not differentiate between one Iraqi and another."

Al-Yawar was scheduled to be the last holder of the rotating council presidency, with a term lasting until 30 June 2004, the date of the expected transition to official Iraqi sovereignty. Instead, he was chosen at an earlier date to be Iraq's formal Head of State, and occupy the largely symbolic post of "State President" of Iraq. Adnan Pachachi was preferred by UN envoy Lakhdar Brahimi, but most members of the Governing Council had favored al-Yawar. Members of the council had accused the UN of trying to impose a new Iraqi president against their wishes. The dispute delayed the announcement of the interim government that would lead Iraq from the end of the month, but on 1 June 2004 the special envoy to Iraq, Lakhdar Brahimi, confirmed Sheikh Ghazi's appointment as interim president. Ayad Allawi, who served as Prime Minister during al-Yawar's presidency, is a Shiite Muslim. The two collectively represented Iraq's largest Muslim sects. Al-Yawar and the Iraqi Interim Government were sworn in on 28 June 2004, when the U.S.-led coalition handed over power two days early.

Sheikh Ghazi's selection as interim president, at first resisted and then accepted by the American administrators in Iraq, is further recognition of the tribal revival at this time. Although this post was described as largely ceremonial, it in fact exercised both symbolic and political sway. As a Sunni tribal leader, he reassured his fellow Sunnis while also representing a familiar type of authority figure for the tribal Kurds, and embodying traditional values esteemed by Shiite religious figures. Faleh A. Jabar, a senior fellow at the United States Institute of Peace in Washington, called Sheikh Ghazi "a tribal figure who knows modern ways, not a modern leader who knows tribal ways. He is clever, cautious in choosing words and values the seniority of age, a supreme value in tribal people. Being a sheikh, you have to give the lead to each and everyone except yourself."

L. Paul Bremer in his memoirs indicated that George W. Bush himself urged the appointment of al-Yawar, as Bush "had been favorably impressed by Ghazi's open thanks to the Coalition for overthrowing Saddam and by his determination to continue the process to sovereignty and eventual democracy."

But to many Iraqis, Sheikh al-Yawar was part of the Governing Council, which had lost virtually all legitimacy after its inability to solve the military and political crisis that had erupted across Iraq in April. Al-Yawar had been openly critical of the sectarian Governing Council, often acknowledging that the council was more focused on survival than on serious issues, adding only to the country's problems. "We sit in the council while the country is burning and argue over procedure," Sheikh Ghazi told the Christian Science Monitor. "We're like the Byzantines in Constantinople, debating whether angels are male or female with the barbarians at the gate." Like Ayad Allawi, the prime minister, and many of the council members appointed to new jobs in the cabinet and ministries, he faced a struggle to live down his role as a former council member.

Al-Yawar proved determined not to appear as a puppet of the Coalition forces. He pulled no punches when criticizing the United States for the dismal lack of security in Iraq. "We blame the United States 100 percent for the security in Iraq," he said. "They occupied the country, disbanded the security agencies and for 10 months left Iraq's borders open for anyone to come in without a visa or even a passport."

In addition, Sheikh Ghazi condemned the U.S. for remaining in Saddam Hussein's former Republican Palace presidential compound and converting it to their embassy, as some reports suggested. "This is like someone who pokes his finger in another's eye," he declared.

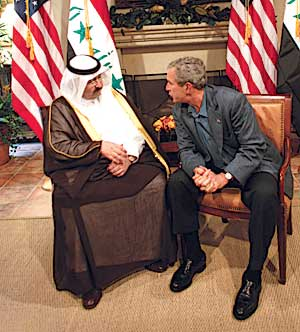
President George W. Bush confers with al-Yawer during the 9 June 2004 G8 summit at Sea Island, GA.

As the Coalition-led siege in Fallujah peaked during his term as interim president, al-Yawer openly disparaged the assault that only a few months earlier led him to almost resign from the Governing Council in protest of the Coalition's actions. He told Reuters "I completely disagree with those who see a need to decide the [Fallujah] matter through military action. The Coalition's handling of the crisis is wrong. It's like someone who fired bullets at his horse's head just because a fly landed on it; the horse died and the fly went away." He condemned the actions of the coalition forces, holding them completely accountable (according to the UN resolution) for delivering safety and aid to the Iraqi people.

== Post-presidency ==
Al-Yawar held the position as President of Iraq in an interim capacity until an elected Iraqi Parliament could select a new permanent president, as mandated in the Law of Administration for the State of Iraq for the Transitional Period. This happened on 6 April 2005 when Jalal Talabani was elected president, and al-Yawar, after much negotiation, accepted to serve as one of Iraq's two vice-presidents.

As vice-president, Sheikh Ghazi addressed some of the many challenges faced by the new government. Due to the boycott of elections by Iraqi Sunnis, al-Yawar stood by his conviction that the new constitution should not be written in light of the past elections that created a unique situation – a complete sector of the Iraqi people were unable to partake in them. The election results were to be taken as the basis for a balance in drafting a constitution for all Iraqis. The constitution, as al-Yawar said in an interview with Asharq Al-Awsat, "was meant to be always for all the Iraqis and to look after them all and not be 100 percent the whims of a group, religion, or ideology but must have more common ground and denominators for the Iraqi people." At this time, al-Yawar called for a separation between religion and politics, believing religion is too sacred to be polluted by politics. "Religion directs the country towards the public welfare and love while politics is much planning, maneuvers, prevarications and compromises and it is inappropriate for it to put on the cloak of religion."

In the January 2005 Iraqi election for the Iraqi National Assembly, he was the leader of The Iraqis (Iraqioun), the largest secular list of candidates with a Sunni leader. His list won about 150,000 votes, 2% of the national vote. Al-Yawar, one of only a handful of Sunni leaders that did not boycott the elections and the only Sunni figure of national standing who appeared to have secured a place in the assembly, took five seats in Parliament.

In the January 2006 election, he joined the Iraqi National List coalition with other secular politicians Ayad Allawi and Adnan Pachachi. He then became a member of the Iraqi Parliament and after a short period of time resigned from the Parliament to return to his private life. Although it was hard to find research or polling on the subject, a few Sunni commentators, such as "Riverbend" of Baghdad Burning, suggested that Ghazi al-Yawer's poor showing in the elections was largely because he was held in low esteem by common Sunni Iraqis, being called by the epithet "al Baqara al dhahika", which translates roughly as "the laughing cow".

Political offices
Preceded by Ezzedine Salim	President of the Governing Council of Iraq; 2004	Succeeded by Ayad Allawi as Prime Minister of Iraq
Preceded by Paul Bremer as Administrator of the Coalition Provisional Authority of Iraq	Interim President of Iraq; 2004–2006	Succeeded by Jalal Talabani as President of Iraq
