= Iraqi security forces =

US DoD term for Iraqi forces

The Iraqi Security Forces (ISF) was a term used by the United States Department of Defense (DoD) to describe law enforcement and military forces of the federal government of the Republic of Iraq. During the initial U.S. phase of the Iraq War from 2003-2010, these entities received training and instruction from the multinational Multi-National Force – Iraq. After U.S. forces reentered Iraq, after the rise of the Islamic State, they received training and assistance from the U.S. Combined Joint Task Force – Operation Inherent Resolve.

According to Article 121 of Iraq's constitution, the federal regions are responsible for the establishment and organization of internal security forces of their respective regions. Therefore, Peshmerga (Note: Internal security forces of Kurdistan region, currently Iraq's only federal region.) is not within the scope of this term.

== Composition ==
The ISF consists of the following agencies and departments:

- Ministry of Defense
  - Iraqi Armed Forces:
    - Iraqi Army
      - Iraqi Army Aviation Command
    - Iraqi Navy
    - Iraqi Air Force
    - Iraqi Air Defence Command
- Ministry of Interior:
  - Iraqi Police
  - Facilities Protection Service
  - Department of Border Enforcement
  - Popular Mobilization Forces

== See also ==
- Law enforcement in Iraq
