= Salvador Option =

Approach to counter-insurgency warfare

The Salvador Option is an approach to counter-insurgency warfare involving the use of death squads utilized by the United States Department of Defense during the Salvadoran Civil War. The term was later used in the context of counter insurgency operations coordinated by Colonel James Steele, a retired special forces veteran who was nominated by Donald Rumsfeld to help organize Shi'ite paramilitaries in an attempt to quell a Sunni insurgency during the Iraq War. From 1984 to 1986 Steele operated as a counterinsurgency specialist and was head of the United States Military Group of US special forces advisers to frontline battalions of the Salvadorean military (which developed a reputation for its death squad activities).

The use of such methods in Iraq was controversial and attracted debate in the Pentagon and among members of the Nouri al-Maliki's government. It raised the question of possible U.S. military involvement in the use of quasi-official death squads, a tactic that was allegedly instrumental in bringing a decade-long war against the Salvadoran Farabundo Martí National Liberation Front (FMLN) to a close.

As the insurgency intensified, the US Military turned to Israel for lessons in military occupation. Israeli officers trained American troops in urban warfare techniques based on their experience in the West Bank and Gaza. An article published in the Guardian quoted senior a US intelligence official who confirmed Israeli involvement and the setting up of assassination teams.

An article published by Newsweek in January 2005 that explored the notion of the "Salvador Option" quoted anonymous military insiders but did not specify the precise origin of the phrase or explicitly say that those words were actually used by Pentagon sources..

According to Newsweek:

...one Pentagon proposal would send Special Forces teams to advise, support and possibly train Iraqi squads, most likely hand-picked Kurdish Peshmerga fighters and Shiite militiamen, to target Sunni insurgents and their sympathizers, even across the border into Syria, according to military insiders familiar with the discussions. It remains unclear, however, whether this would be a policy of assassination or so-called "snatch" operations, in which the targets are sent to secret facilities for interrogation. The current thinking is that while U.S. Special Forces would lead operations in, say, Syria, activities inside Iraq itself would be carried out by Iraqi paramilitaries.

Rumsfeld has publicly denounced the Newsweek article as "nonsense", when directly asked if such a policy was under consideration, he answered "Why would I even talk about something like that?" Observers of the Iraqi conflict have taken these and other cues to argue that the "Salvador Option" was put into operation. They point in particular to the existence of a Shi'ite led unit affiliated with the Iraqi ministry known as the Wolf Brigade.

== See also ==
- Chinese Solution
- Phoenix Program
- Special Police Commandos, a Sunni unit operating since September, 2004.
- Sons of Iraq
- Wolf Brigade, Shi'ite counter-insurgency unit operating since October 2004.
