= Mohammed Al-Ghabban =

Iraqi politician

Dr. Mohammed Al-Ghabban
- محمد الغبّان
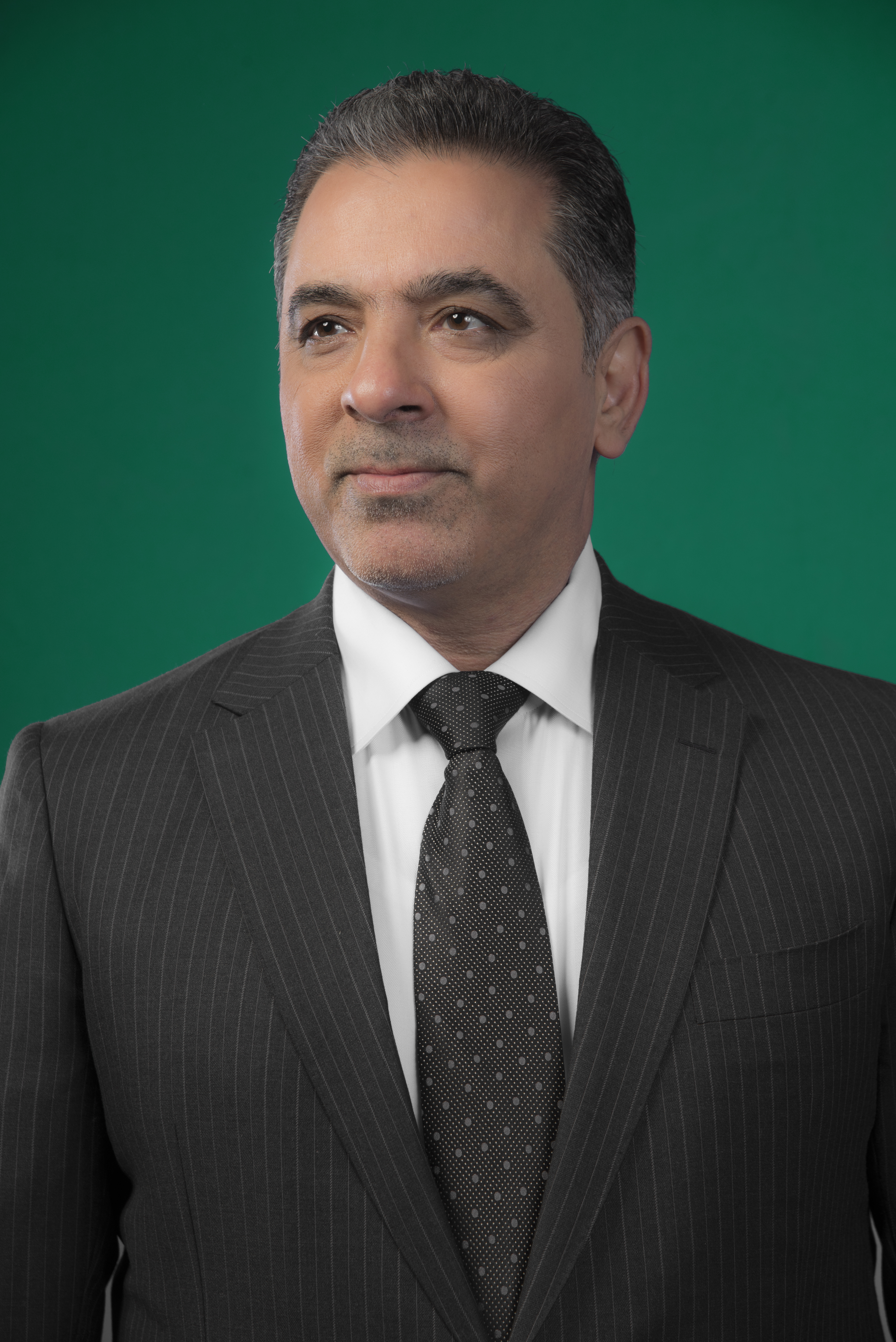

Minister of Interior
- In office 18 October 2014 – 8 July 2016
- Prime Minister: Haider al-Abadi
- Preceded by: Nouri al-Maliki
- Succeeded by: Qasim al-Araji

Member of the Parliament
- In office 1 September 2018 – Present

Personal details
- Born: November 14, 1961 (age 64) Baghdad, Iraq
- Other political affiliations: Fatah Alliance
- Education: University of London

Dr. Mohammed Al-Ghabban (Arabic: محمد سالم الغبان, born 14 November 1961 in Karrada-Baghdad) is an Iraqi politician and the former Minister of Interior.

Al-Ghabban was first elected to the Iraqi Council of Representatives in 2014 as representative for Baghdad. As member of the State of Law Coalition he went on to be appointed Minister of Interior and was sworn in on 18 October 2014. He was in office until 8 July 2016. In September 2018 he was elected as an MP for Baghdad region in the Iraqi Parliament's 4th term. Currently he's the head of the Fatah Alliance bloc in the Iraqi Parliament and member of the Foreign Committee.

Al-Ghabban, who speaks English, graduated from high school in Baghdad in 1979 with a diploma in Modern Management. In 1996, he earned a bachelor's degree in English Studies from Allameh Tabataba'i University. In 2006, he obtained a master's degree in Islamic Studies from the University of London (Birkbeck). In 2018 he received his doctorate degree in Political Sciences from the University of Tehran.

== Posts ==
- 2006–2010 ----- Director of the Office to the Chairman of Security and Defence Committee
- 2007–2010 ----- Adviser to Presidency Council of Iraq
- 2010–2014 ----- Adviser to Minister of Transport
- 2014–2014 ----- Member of Iraqi Parliament (3rd term)
- 2014–2016 ----- Iraq Minister of Interior
- 2017–2018 ----- Adviser to PMF office
- 2018-2019 ----- Member of the Security and Defence Committee of Iraqi Parliament
- 2018–2022 ----- Member of Iraqi Parliament (4th term)
- 2019–2022 ----- Member of the Foreign Relations Committee of Iraqi Parliament
- 2019–2022 ----- Head of the parliamentary bloc for Fatah Alliance in the Iraqi Parliament

== Political career ==
Al-Ghabban joined the Iraqi opposition in 1981 after his detention by Saddam Hussein's regime in 1979. He actively participated in various activities of the opposition against the former regime whilst in Iraq and in exile. He returned to Iraq shortly after the fall of the former regime, and participated in numerous political initiatives to rebuild what was destroyed by the previous regime. From 2006 to 2010, he was the director of the private office to the Chairman of the Security and Defense committee of the Council of Representatives. In 2010, he was adviser to the Office of Presidency. Post 2010 elections, he was nominated for the post of Minister of Transport. From 2010 to 2014 he was the adviser to the Minister of Transport. In 2014, he was elected member of the Iraqi Council of Representatives (3rd term) for the province of Baghdad. In October 2014, Al-Ghabban was nominated for the post of Minister of Interior. On 18 October 2014 he won the majority vote at the council of representatives and was approved as minister of interior by a 197–63 vote. On 5 July 2016, two days after the Baghdad bombing in which 323 civilians died, he resigned in protest at the imbalance in the management of the internal security file and stripping the Ministry of the Interior of its powers by intersection of security authorities.

== As Minister of Interior ==
During his tenure as Minister of Interior, Al-Ghabban worked to identify priorities in the strategic plan for the advancement of the Ministry and to improve the performance of the security services. In less than two years, he managed to initiate some of the most strenuous projects including:

- Building the Iraqi Federal Police forces and developing their combat capabilities, arming and re-training. This was reflected in their overwhelming performance and role in the battles against Daesh; of which liberation of key cities such as Fallujah and Mosul was the most prominent.
- Implementation of the Iraqi national ID card project which was stalled for decades.
- Priming and qualifying the Interior Ministry to assume its responsibility of national security by working with the Joint Higher Committees at the Ministry of Defense, the Joint Operations Command and the National Security Advisers. (Since 2003, responsibility and management of Iraq's national/ interior security is directly aligned under the Prime Minister via the Joint Operations Command (Arabic: العمليات المشتركة في العراق), the Interior Ministry is currently (April 2018) absolved from this authority).
