= James Coffman =

James Coffman may refer to:

- James H. Coffman Jr., United States Army officer who was awarded the Distinguished Service Cross
- James Burton Coffman (1905–2006), Churches of Christ minister
