= Wolf Brigade (Iraq) =

- Wolf Brigade SSI
- Active: Sep 2004 (current form)
- Allegiance: Iraq
- Branch: Ministry of Interior
- Type: Commando
- Role: Counterinsurgency
- Size: ~2,000
- Part of: Iraqi Police
- Garrison/HQ: Nisour Square, Baghdad (HQ)
- Colors: Red
- Engagements: Iraq War; War in Iraq

Commanders
- Notable commanders: Brigadier Muhammad Muhsin Zaidan Qureshi (Abu al-Walid)

The Wolf Brigade (Arabic: لواء الذئب, romanized: liwaa' adh-dhi'ib), since 2006 officially Freedom Brigade, is a unit of roughly 2,000 special commando police officially under the Iraqi Ministry of the Interior.

== History ==
=== Formation ===
The Special Police Commandos were an elite counter-insurgency unit answering to the Ministry of the Interior. In June 2004, the Coalition Provisional Authority (CPA) transferred sovereignty to the Iraqi Interim Government. Under the new prime minister, Ayad Allawi, the CPA appointed a new interior minister, Falah Hassan al-Naqib.

Al-Naqib sought to provide the MOI with effective Iraqi constabulary forces after the poor performance of the police in battles against Shiite cleric Muqtada al-Sadr's Mahdi Army. Al-Naqib created "commando units" of former soldiers from elite units such as Saddam's Republican Guard. These units, commanded by al-Naqib's uncle, Adnan Thabit, a former army general, were personally loyal to the minister. The commandos, raised initially without U.S. involvement, were under MOI control, and were outside the U.S. Civilian Police Assistance Training Team (CPATT) program. The U.S. military provided arms and logistical support to these units, which proved effective under Minister al-Naqib's stewardship in fighting alongside U.S. forces against Sunni insurgents and Shiite militias.

The unit was "formed" (or at least publicly revealed) in September 2004 and numbers about 5,000 officers. Its principal U.S. advisor (Counselor) was Colonel James Steele, who also commanded the U.S. Military Advisory Group in El Salvador from 1984 through 1986. It was initially under the command of a former three-star Shia general and SCIRI official who went under the nom de guerre of Abu Walid, but whose real name was Mohammad Qureshi.

The unit was often seen alongside US forces, particularly in Baghdad and Mosul, with the unit fighting in Mosul alongside US and Kurdish forces in November 2004.

By late 2005 the Brigade was approximately 2,000-strong and operated with impunity. The unit was officially under the command of the then interior minister, Ibrahim al-Jafari, who became prime minister in April 2005 for 12 months as sectarian violence massively escalated.

=== Operations ===
In May 2006 Nouri al-Maliki replaced Jafari as prime minister and pledged to crack down on the Wolf Brigade and any other units seen to be carrying out sectarian agendas, however by then most of the Brigades leaders had fled or been killed.

In December 2009, the Wolf Brigade gained notoriety after the success of Terrorism in the Grip of Justice, a primetime show on al-Iraqiya television that featured live interrogations of Iraqi insurgents by Wolf Brigade commandos and was praised in the war log database. In one episode, Abu Walid questioned around thirty shabbily dressed suspects, some clutching photos of their alleged victims, waiting to confess their 'crimes'.

== Structure ==
The unit was almost exclusively Shiite, and drew many of its recruit from the impoverished Shia slums of Sadr city in Baghdad. Members of the Brigade were reportedly paid as much as 700,000 Iraqi dinars, or $534, per month; a large sum in Iraqi terms. Many of the units personnel were members of the Badr Brigade.

The Special Police Commando units later formed under the Dawa and SCIRI transitional government in 2005 were based on the model provided by the Wolf Brigade.

Its members dress in garb — olive uniform, red beret, wraparound sunglasses — redolent of Saddam's elite guard; their armband logo is a menacing-looking wolf.

== Human rights abuses ==
The Wolf Brigade became closely and publicly associated with human rights abuses. There were numerous accounts of human rights violations being carried out by the Wolf Brigade in areas where the Brigade did not operate. Accounts became so widespread that over time, the Wolf Brigade became largely synonymous with the Iraqi police.

US forces in Samarra often handed their captives over to the Wolf Brigade for "further questioning" following repeated raids in 2004 and 2005. A complaint report from the leaked Iraq War Logs alleges in one case that "During the interrogation process the RO [ranking officer] threatened the subject detainee that he would never see his family again and would be sent to the 'Wolf Battalion' where he would be subject to all the pain and agony that the 'Wolf Battalion' is known to exact upon its detainees."

In 2005, the Muslim Scholars Association and other Sunni Arab leaders accused the Wolf Brigade of torturing Palestinian refugees in Iraq, raiding the homes of Sunni Muslims, and committing mass killings in Baghdad. It is also alleged that Abu al-Walid sometimes tortured prisoners personally. Walid dismissed these charges, calling the MSA "infidels." Yet human rights groups say the Wolf Brigade, because of its counterterrorism television show, is violating the Geneva Conventions by publicly humiliating detainees. The militia has also spawned copycat groups, not necessarily under the aegis of the Interior Ministry, with names like the Tiger, Scorpion, or Snake brigades.

The Wolf Brigade was reportedly responsible for the July seizure of eleven Sunni bricklayers who were then locked in the back of police cars and held for sixteen hours in scorching-hot temperatures.

== Popular culture ==
The brigade's fierceness has given it a mythological aura among Shiite Iraqis: Parents are said to warn their children about the "wolves". There are also patriotic songs devoted to the group.

== See also ==
- Iraq War documents leak
