= James Steele (United States Army officer) =

Retired American colonel and figure of the "Dirty Wars"

- Alma mater: University of Dayton (BS); University of Florida (MA)
- Military career
- Allegiance: United States
- Branch: United States Army
- Service years: 24 years
- Rank: Colonel
- Conflicts: Vietnam War; Salvadoran Civil War; Iran contra affair Iraq War
- Awards: Defense Distinguished Service Medal; Silver Star; Legion of Merit (4); Bronze Star Medal (3); Purple Heart

James Steele is a consultant and retired United States Army officer whose military career and work as a military contractor from Vietnam to the Iraq War drew controversy for allegations of abuse and war crimes.

Steele's military career began during the Cold War, assigned to postings in Central and South America. He was involved in the "dirty wars", training counter-insurgency commandos who later carried out violations of human rights. He later served in the Vietnam War. From 1984 to 1986, during the Salvadoran Civil War, Steele operated as a counterinsurgency specialist and was a member of a group of United States special forces advisers to the Salvadoran Army. In 1986 he was implicated in the Iran contra affair. In 2004, early in the Iraq War, Steele was sent by Donald Rumsfeld to serve as a civilian adviser to Iraqi paramilitary Special Police Commandos known as the Wolf Brigade.

== Iraq war counter-insurgency activities ==
In 2004, during the US occupation of Iraq, Steele was sent as a civilian adviser to train the Special Police Commandos; a paramilitary unit known as the Wolf Brigade that was later accused by a UN official of torture and murder, and of being involved in the use of death squads. The Wolf Brigade was created and supported by the US and it enabled the redeployment of Saddam Hussein's Republican Guard but with the new task of suppressing the Iraqi insurgency. According to Angelina Snodgrass Godoy, this was part of the US drive to use "dirty tactics" against insurgents in Iraq, a counterinsurgency doctrine known as "fighting terror with terror," and one that had previously been exercised or promoted by the US in other countries, including Vietnam and El Salvador. Steele worked closely with Colonel James Coffman, an American Army officer who advised Iraqi Special Police Commandos during Multi-National Security Transition Command operations, and who has also been implicated in human rights abuses of Iraqi detainees. Coffman reported directly to General David Petraeus and worked alongside Steele in detention centers that were set up with US funding.

Steele was mentioned by US Ambassador Paul Wolfowitz, former secretary of defense Donald Rumsfeld and others, and was present in various high-profile meetings while keeping a secret role. In 2013, The Guardian and the BBC revealed Steele's connection to torture centres which sprang up after US led Shia groups joined the security forces. According to that report, "Jim" Steele's first experience of war was in Vietnam. Later, from 1984 to 1986, "Steele – a 'counterinsurgency specialist' – was head of the US MilGroup of US special forces advisers to front line battalions of the Salvadoran military, which developed a fearsome international reputation for its death-squad activities." He later "became involved in the Iran-Contra affair, which saw the proceeds from covert arms sales by senior US officials to Iran used to fund the Contras". The Guardian writes, "Soon after the 2003 US-led invasion of Iraq, now retired Colonel James Steele was in Baghdad as one of the White House's most important agents, sending back reports to Donald Rumsfeld and acting as the US defense secretary's personal envoy to Iraq's Special Police Commandos, whose intelligence-gathering activities he oversaw."

General Muntadher al-Samari, Iraqi interior ministry commander from 2003 to 2005, revealed the US role in torture carried out by the Special Commandos' interrogation units, claiming that Steele and his colleague Col. James H. Coffman, Jr. knew exactly what was being done. Al-Samari described "the ugliest sorts of torture" he had ever seen, which included the severe beating and hanging of detainees, as well as the pulling off of their fingernails. The Guardian report also claimed that the US backing of sectarian paramilitary units helped create conditions that led to sectarian civil war.

The Guardian's documentary "James Steele: America's mystery man in Iraq" shows a memo from Steele to Rumsfeld which Rumsfeld had released as part of "The Rumsfeld Papers". In the memo Steele stated that SCIRI and its Badr Brigade protected "thugs like the commander of the Wolf Brigade who has been engaged in death squad activities".

== Business activities ==
Col. James Steele is currently registered with Premiere Motivational Speakers, through which he charges $15,000 to give speeches on "Security and Counterterrorism Policy". He is also listed as the CEO of Buchanan Renewables, an energy company that produces biomass in Liberia. Steele's company has been accused of corporate malfeasance by the Liberian legislature and was the subject of an investigative report in 2011 by the Centre for Research on Multinational Corporations. The report describes "how the company, which presents itself as a highly sustainable venture, has a negative impact on the livelihoods of a number of smallholder farmers, has not taken adequate measures to improve the energy situation in Liberia, and has a corporate structure which can be optimally used to avoid paying taxes in Liberia."

== See also ==
- Farabundo Martí National Liberation Front
- Foreign internal defense
- Salvador Option
