= James H. Coffman Jr. =

United States Army officer

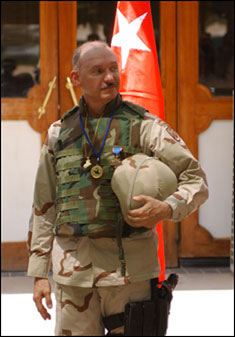
- Colonel James H. Coffman Jr. after being awarded the Distinguished Service Cross
- Born: 1954 (age 71–72); Great Barrington, Massachusetts
- Military career
- Allegiance: United States
- Branch: United States Army
- Service years: 1978–2014
- Rank: Colonel
- Conflicts: Iraq War
- Awards: Distinguished Service Cross; Bronze Star Medal

Colonel James Henry Coffman Jr. (born 1954) is a retired United States Army officer who was awarded the Distinguished Service Cross for valorous conduct while serving as an advisor with the Multi-National Security Transition Command – Iraq attached to the Iraqi Special Police Commandos in Mosul, Iraq in 2004.

== Early life and education ==
Coffman grew up in Great Barrington, Massachusetts. He graduated from the United States Military Academy at West Point, New York in 1978. Coffman subsequently earned a Master of Science degree in National Security Affairs from the Naval Postgraduate School. He was also a United States Army Fellow at the Fletcher School of Law and Diplomacy at Tufts University, and attended the Boston University Overseas Program for Master of Science in International Relations in Vicenza, Italy. In the course of his formal education Coffman has authored papers on ethnic conflict in the post-Cold War world.

== Iraq war counter-insurgency activities ==
Coffman served during the US occupation of Iraq. While working as a civilian advisor, his unit was attacked on November 14, 2004. During this attack, he was commended for the leadership he provided his troops while outnumbered against a group of Iraqi insurgents. He continued fighting even after an enemy round shattered his shooting hand, continuing to fire with his other hand. After reinforcements arrived, Coffman refused to exit the battle despite his injuries. He was awarded the Distinguished Service Cross for these actions.

Coffman worked as a civilian adviser to train the Special Police Commandos; a paramilitary unit known as the Wolf Brigade that was later accused by a UN official of torture and murder, and which was also implicated in the use of death squads. The Wolf Brigade was created and supported by the US and it enabled the redeployment of Saddam Hussein's Republican Guard but with the new task of terrorising those connected with the Iraqi insurgency. This was part of the US drive to use "dirty tactics" against insurgents in Iraq, a counterinsurgency doctrine known as "fighting terror with terror," and one that had previously been exercised by the US in other theaters, including Vietnam and El Salvador.

Coffman worked closely with security consultant James Steele advising Iraqi Special Police Commandos during Multi-National Security Transition Command operations, and who has also been implicated in human rights abuses of Iraqi detainees. Coffman reported directly to General David Petraeus and worked alongside Steele in detention centers that were set up with US funding.

General Muntadher al-Samari, Iraqi interior ministry commander from 2003 to 2005, revealed the US role in torture carried out by the Special Commandos' interrogation units, claiming that Steele and Coffman knew exactly what was being done. Al-Samari described "the ugliest sorts of torture" he had ever seen, which included the severe beating and hanging of detainees, as well the pulling off of their fingernails. The Guardian report also claimed that the US backing of sectarian paramilitary units helped create conditions that led to sectarian civil war.

== Awards and decorations ==
Coffman has been awarded the Distinguished Service Cross, the Bronze Star Medal, Defense Meritorious Service Medal, Meritorious Service Medal with four oak leaf clusters, Joint Service Commendation Medal with two oak leaf clusters, the Combat Infantryman Badge, Expert Infantryman Badge, Special Forces Tab and the Ranger tab.

== See also ==
- Battle of Mosul
