= Qasim al-Araji =

Iraqi politician

- قاسم الأعرجي
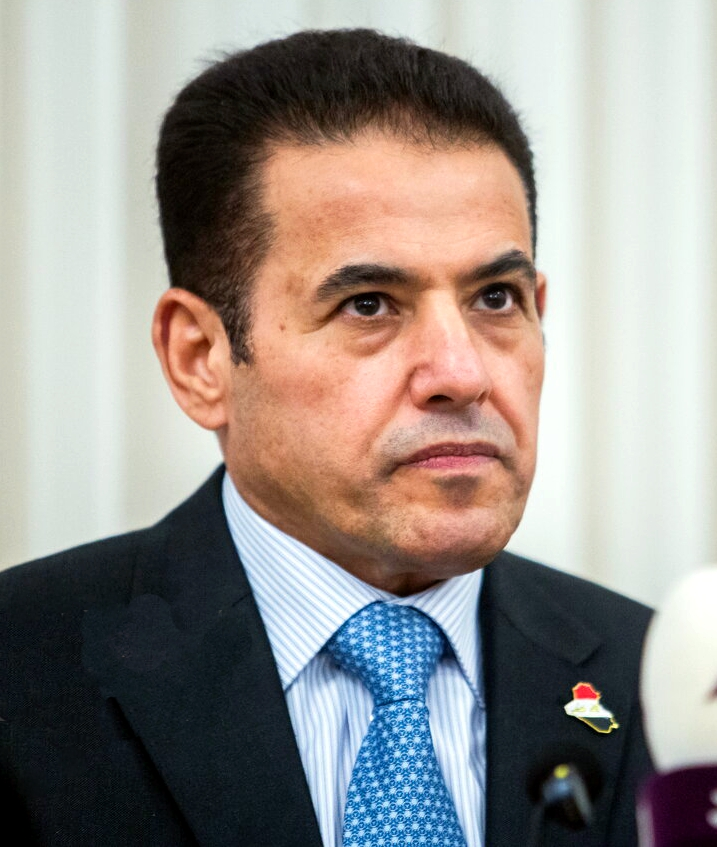

National Security Advisor
- In office 4 July 2020 – 18 June 2026
- Prime Minister: Mustafa al-Kadhimi; Mohammed Shia al-Sudani
- Preceded by: Falih Al-Fayyadh
- Succeeded by: Qasim al-Aboudi

Minister of Interior
- In office 30 January 2017 – 25 October 2018
- Prime Minister: Haider al-Abadi
- Preceded by: Mohammed Al-Ghabban
- Succeeded by: Adil Abdul-Mahdi

Personal details
- Born: Qasim Mohammad Jalal al-Araji al-Hussaini; 3 March 1964 (age 62) Kut, Iraq
- Party: Badr Organization
- Children: 4

Qasim al-Araji (Arabic: قاسم الأعرجي; born 3 March 1964 in Kut) is an Iraqi politician, former minister of interior, and national security advisor serving from July 2020 to June 2026. Araji is a senior member of the Badr Organization.

== Early life ==
He was born on 3 March 1964 in Kut, Wasit Governorate in eastern Iraq to a Shia Muslim Arab family. He completed his primary school education at the al-Gharbiyah elementary school and his secondary school education at al-Kut high school in 1982.

== Prisoner of war ==
His official biography claims he moved to Iran shortly after the 1979 Iranian Revolution, but it is likely that he was in reality a soldier in the Iraqi army in 1984 and fought in the Iran–Iraq War. He was captured by Iranian forces and eventually joined the Badr Organisation, made up of Iraqi anti-Saddam dissidents who received training and support from the Iranian Revolutionary Guard Corps (IRGC). He was trained in camps of the IRGC and fought against Iraq for the remainder of the war, later carrying out intelligence work against the government of Saddam.

== Return to Iraq ==
He returned to Iraq after the 2003 invasion of Iraq by the United States. On April 19, 2003, he was arrested by the U.S. on suspicion of commanding militia forces. He was held for 85 days and then released on insufficient evidence.

In 2007, he was again detained by U.S. forces and held in Camp Bucca for 23 months. A secret cable from the U.S. Embassy in Baghdad, dated January 19, 2007 and published by WikiLeaks, stated that U.S. forces "had good information based on multiple sources," that al-Araji was "involved in smuggling and distribution" of explosives that were being used to target U.S. forces and that he was "also suspected in involvement in an assassination cell." He was again released for lack of evidence.

== Political career ==
=== Member of Parliament ===
In the 2014 Iraqi parliamentary election, he was elected as a member of parliament for the Wasit Province. He was also appointed a member of the Security & Defense Commission and head of the Badr bloc in the parliament.

Between 2014 and 2015, he repeatedly claimed the United States was supporting the Islamic State of Iraq and the Levant, saying, "The U.S. has supported ISIS in Syria and funded the group in Iraq," adding that, "The duality of America is very clear in terms of fighting ISIS, The U.S. government supports the Kurdistan region in battling ISIS, but refuses to stand with the Iraqi security forces or the tribesmen in battling the group."

=== From enemy of US to ally ===
He was approved by Parliament as the head of the Iraqi Interior Ministry on Jan 30, 2017. He replaced Mohammed Al-Ghabban who had resigned. Upon taking office he ousted 30,000 people whose "behavior was not conducive to a professional security force." Al-Araji showed willingness to work with both the United States and Sunnis. He appointed Sunnis to key positions in the Ministry and stated that Iraq continues to need American help. The New York Times described Araji as an old enemy who has now become an ally of the United States. Following the 2018 Iraqi parliamentary election, Prime Minister Adil Abdul-Mahdi succeeded al-Araji as head of the ministry on an interim basis.

=== National Security Advisor ===
In July 2020, Araji was appointed as the Iraqi National Security Advisor. He was succeeded by Qasim al-Aboudi on 18 June 2026.

=== Candidacy for the Premiership ===
In April 2026, after the 2025 Iraqi parliamentary election, the Coordination Framework was considering al-Araji as a possible successor to Mohammed Shia al-Sudani.

=== Security Advisor to al-Zaidi ===
On 20 June 2026, al-Araji was appointed the personal security advisor of prime minister Ali al-Zaidi.

== Personal life ==
He is married and has four children.
