= Battle of Mosul (2004) =

Battle during the Iraq War

Coordinates: 36°20′6″N 43°7′8″E

- Part of the Iraq War
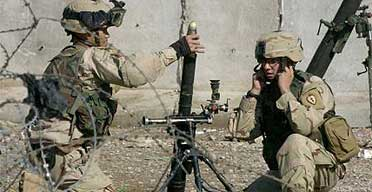
- Soldiers from 1st Battalion, 24th Infantry Regiment fire mortars at insurgent positions in the city
Date	November 8–16, 2004
Location	Mosul, Iraq
Result	Coalition victory: Failed insurgent attempt to take Mosul

Belligerents
United States (Iraq) Iraqi Security Forces (Kurdistan Region) Peshmerga	Al-Qaeda in Iraq; Ansar al-Sunna; Islamic Army in Iraq; Ba'ath Party Loyalists; Brigades of the Army of the Mustafa; Army of the Conqueror; Other Iraqi insurgents

Commanders and leaders
(United States) John Sattler (United States) Col Robert Brown (United States) Jim Coffman (Iraq) Adnan Thabit (Police commando leader) (Iraq) Ahmed Khalaf Jabouri (Police commissioner); Masoud Barzani	Mohammad Khalaf Shakara (Abu Talha-Ansar leader); Mousa Mahdi (Abu Abdul-Rahman-Ansar second-in-command); Hassan Ibrahim Farhan † (AQI media chief)

Strength
2,000	Unknown

Casualties and losses
(United States) 18 killed 170 wounded (Iraq) 116 killed 5,000 deserted (United Kingdom) 1 security contractor killed	Estimated 600 – at least 71 killed (confirmed) actual losses unknown
- Unknown number of civilians killed 1 Turkish truck driver

The Battle of Mosul was fought during the Iraq War in November 2004 for the city of Mosul the capital of the Ninawa Governorate in northern Iraq that occurred concurrently to fighting in Fallujah.

== Prelude ==
During the occupation by the U.S. 101st Airborne Division in 2003, a 21,000-strong force under General David Petraeus, the U.S. forces made a civil peace with the local Sunni tribes. However, after its pullout, the CIA allied itself almost exclusively with the Kurds, and the U.S. had been seen as essentially another tribal ally of the Kurds, making conflict inevitable. While one battalion of the 25th Infantry Division were heading out of Mosul to Fallujah to help in the attack on the city, insurgents were, ironically, coming into the city from Fallujah where they were joined by foreign fighters from across the border. Attacks on coalition forces in the city intensified and the insurgents were planning on trying to take the city when the attack on Fallujah began.

== Battle ==
By November 8, 2004, insurgents were conducting coordinated attacks and ambushes in an attempt to take over the city. That same day, units from the 1st Battalion, 24th Infantry Regiment, known as "Deuce Four", fought against the insurgents in the vicinity of the Yarmuk traffic circle, in the heart of western Mosul. The battle lasted throughout the day and the insurgents proved to be both determined and coordinated. The 3rd Battalion, 21st Infantry Regiment, known as "Gimlets" to the north was hammered with mortars while insurgents attacked from the west, east, and south with small arms fire, RPGs, and machine gun fire. As a testament to the intensity of combat that day, a 30-man Platoon (2nd PLT) from Bravo Co. 1st Battalion, 24th Infantry Regiment sustained 9 casualties and 2 out of their 4 Stryker vehicles were rendered useless as RPGs and machine gun fire had taken out their weapon systems. Kiowa Warrior helicopter gunships had also taken out several technical vehicles that day.

On November 9, 2004, an Army Major and an Air Force Master Sergeant died as a result of an RPG attack and mortar attack on Forward Operating Base Courage in Mosul. On November 10, 2004, hundreds of insurgents flooded the streets of the city. They started attacking Iraqi security forces and by the next day had taken the initiative. On November 11, the insurgents had captured one police station and destroyed two more. They broke into the stations' armories and distributed the weapons and flak jackets they could find. The Iraqi police force was overrun in a matter of hours, scattering and deserting from the street fighting. Security in the city almost completely broke down. Once again, the soldiers from Deuce Four on the west side of the city and the Gimlets on the east side of the city took the fight to the enemy. Notably, this time Bravo Co., Deuce-Four was set up to the west of the Yarmuk traffic circle as Alpha Co. and other elements from Deuce Four to the east, pushed west. The hammer against the anvil plan worked and once again the units were involved in intense urban combat. Jets flew overhead dropping JDAM bombs while the infantrymen below fought house to house and held their ground against insurgent assaults and mortar attacks. SPC Thomas K. Doerflinger from Bravo Co. 1-24th was among the casualties that day when he was shot in the head and killed by a sniper as he provided covering fire for his fellow soldiers. He was awarded the Bronze Star posthumously.

Before the end of the night, insurgent forces had managed to take one of the five bridges over the Tigris river before the Americans took control of the other four. Further insurgent reinforcements arrived at the city on November 12 in technicals and other vehicles. Nine more police stations were attacked – one was destroyed, and the others were taken. The headquarters of the Kurdish Democratic Party was also attacked and burned to the ground. The insurgents proceeded then to the party buildings of the Patriotic Union of Kurdistan. Alarmed by the attacks, the Peshmerga installed a heavy machinegun on the roof and 12 peshmerga fought off dozens, if not hundreds of insurgents, until 600 other Peshmerga reached the scene and managed to deny insurgents control over the Kurdish populated east side of Mosul. Nevertheless, the insurgents managed to control the whole western Arab part of the City. The Peshmerga sent another 2000 fighters into Mosul in response to a request by the Iraqi Defense Ministry in an effort to stop the insurgent advance. The United States Air Force began a bombing campaign on rebel positions in the city which continued into the next day. One of the targets hit was a cemetery.

By November 13, the insurgents had assumed control of two-thirds of the city. They began to hunt down members of the new Iraqi security forces and publicly execute them, usually by beheading. 1st Battalion, 5th Infantry Regiment of the U.S. 25th Infantry Division was diverted from the attack on Fallujah to help in retaking the city. Also, 300 members of the Iraqi National Guard from the Syrian border, an Iraqi special forces battalion from Baghdad and a number of Kurdish Peshmerga fighters were called in to assist. All established U.S. Forward Operating Bases in Mosul held. Two more police stations were taken by the insurgents on November 14, though their forces withdrew from one, and the Ninewah Provincial Governor's house was burned down. However, thanks to Colonel James H. Coffman and the Iraqi Special Police Commandos, the police station known as Four West was spared. For his actions that day, Colonel Coffman was awarded the Distinguished Service Cross.

At approximately 1030 hours on November 14, Colonel Coffman moved with a Commando Quick Reaction Force (QRF) to reinforce a Commando platoon under attack at the Four West Police Station in Mosul. As the QRF neared the besieged platoon, it came under intense rocket-propelled grenade, mortar, machinegun, and AK-47 fire by a large insurgent force. Over the next four hours, the enemy repeatedly assaulted the Commandos' position, at times culminating their attacks twenty meters from Colonel Coffman's location. With all but one of the commando officers killed or seriously wounded by the initial enemy fire, Colonel Coffman exhibited truly inspirational leadership, rallying the Commandos and organizing a hasty defense while attempting to radio higher headquarters for reinforcements. Under heavy fire, he moved from Commando to Commando, issuing them orders with hand signals. At one point, an enemy round shattered Colonel Coffman's shooting hand and rendered his M4 rifle inoperable.

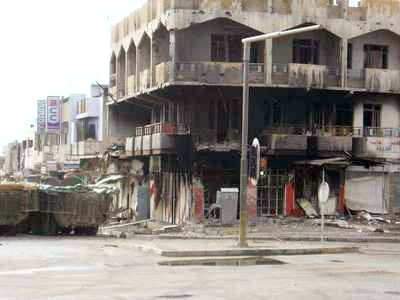
Ruined buildings during the street fighting in Mosul

After bandaging his hand, Colonel Coffman picked up AK-47s from Commando casualties and fired them with his other hand until each ran out of ammunition. With the assistance of the one remaining Commando officer, Colonel Coffman redistributed ammunition among the uninjured commandos until he had only loose ammunition. Four hours after the start of the battle, a second Commando element arrived, and Colonel Coffman guided them to his position. Shortly thereafter attack helicopters arrived, followed closely by the second platoon Outlaws of Charlie Company 3/21 INF. Colonel Coffman used Iraqi radios to direct air strikes, while the Outlaws engaged insurgents in surrounding buildings after receiving small arm and RPG fire. After supervising the evacuation of several dozen wounded Commandos, Colonel Coffman led a squad-sized element to the Four West Iraqi Police Station, fifty meters ahead of the Strykers, to make contact with the Commandos still in the station. After they linked up, the Strykers moved forward, and attack helicopters engaged the buildings occupied by the enemy, following which Colonel Coffman returned to his original position where he was evacuated with the rest of the Iraqi commando casualties. During the fierce four-hour battle, twelve Commandos were killed and 42 were wounded. Twenty-five enemy were killed and many dozens more were wounded.

Two days later, on November 16, U.S. forces managed to break through across the insurgent-controlled bridge, and went on to take back the northern, eastern and southern part of the city. The Americans reported that they met little resistance, though three of the ten police stations were burned down by withdrawing insurgent forces. By late in the evening the city was partly secured by the 25th Infantry.

== Aftermath ==
Over the next three weeks, 76 bodies of executed Iraqi soldiers were found throughout the city. Eighteen American service members were killed and another 170 were wounded. At least 31 members of the Iraqi security forces were killed, along with at least nine Kurdish Peshmerga fighters (actual numbers are unknown). An estimated 600 insurgents were killed, along with five civilians, one South African security contractor, and one Turkish truck driver. Actual casualty figures remain unknown. The insurgents managed to make a safe haven out of the western part of the city from where they continued to conduct hit and run attacks over the coming months. One of the more notable attacks came just a month after the fighting ceased on December 21, 2004, when a suicide bomber dressed like an Iraqi soldier managed to get into the mess tent on an American base called Forward Operating Base Marez, and detonated himself – killing 22 people, including 14 American soldiers. The insurgent group known as Jaish Ansar al-Sunna claimed responsibility for the attack. The battle resulted in the city complement of security forces deserting leaving the area insecure. The 1st Brigade, 25th Infantry Division (Stryker Brigade Combat Team) was on their own in the city until they were able to build up the Iraqi Police and Iraqi Military presence once again.

== See also ==
- 2008 Mosul offensive
