= Facilities Protection Service =

The Facilities Protection Service is an Iraqi security agency force tasked with the fixed site protection of Iraqi Government buildings, facilities, and personnel. The FPS includes Oil, Electricity Police and Port Security. It works for all Iraqi government ministries and governmental agencies, but its standards are set and enforced by the Iraqi Ministry of Interior. It can also be hired to protect private property.

As of 2005, the Coalition no longer provides material or logistical support to the FPS.

== Organization ==
The FPS consists of more than 150,000 Facility Protection Service personnel and over 26,000 contract security guards who work for 26 ministries, eight independent directorates and the Central Bank of Iraq. Anecdotal evidence suggests that some of them are unreliable and responsible for violent crimes. Iraqi Prime Minister Nouri al-Maliki has announced a reform to consolidate all Facilities Protection Service personnel into a unified organization responsible to the Ministry of Interior. These act in two capacities: as security guards at government buildings and as Personal Security Details to protect important government officials. This number includes approximately 2,200 Diplomatic Protection Service (DPS) guards charged with protecting foreign embassies in Iraq.

There are an estimated 17,800 FPS personnel who working for the MOI. Half of them work in Baghdad. The MOI's FPS has established better regulation, training, and discipline than have FPS staff in other ministries, and a higher proportion of them, possibly half, have completed the Facility Protection Service basic training course.

The majority of the FPS staff consists of former Iraqi military personnel and former security guards. The FPS will now secure public facilities such as hospitals, banks, and power stations within their district. Once trained, the guards work with US military and coalition forces protecting critical sites like schools, hospitals and power plants. Being part of the Ba'ath Party is not disqualifier on joining the Facility Protection Service or working elsewhere with coalition forces.

The FPS are paid on either on a contract basis or according to a civil pay scale which is lower than that of the Police or the New Iraqi Army. The starting salary of an FPS guard is 83,000ID ($56) per month and FPS guards receive an additional 96,000ID ($64) per month in hazardous duty pay.

== Reorganization ==
The Iraqi government has created a national headquarters for the FPS, began to codify the relationships among the different ministries' FPS forces, and standardized the uniforms and vehicle markings, recruiting, training, terms and conditions of service, and responsibilities.

Eight reviewing committees were established to assess the current status of the organization and to make recommendations for future change.

== Uniforms and equipment ==
FPS uniforms consists of light grey shirts with dark blue pants, a leather belt, and a grey beret. They wear brassards which bear the letters 'FPS' under the Iraqi flag.

They are armed with AK-47's, PKMs, Glock 19 pistols, individual body armor, high-frequency radios, small and medium pick-up trucks, and mid-sized SUVs.

The FPS' vehicles are provided by the various government agencies or private organizations.

== Issues ==
Allegations were made by Ellen Knickmeyer of The Washington Post on Saturday, October 14, 2006; that the FPS was behind Death Squads operating in Baghdad, he also has repeatedly suggested that killings by gunmen in police uniforms were being carried out by impostors to discredit the government.

== See also ==
- Iraqi Army
- Iraqi Air Force
- Iraqi Navy
- Iraqi security forces
- Iraqi National Guard
- Military ranks of Iraq
