= Iraqi Police =

Uniformed police force responsible for the enforcement of civil law in Iraq

Iraqi Police الشرطة العراقية Shurta/Polis

- Abbreviation: IP

Agency overview
- Formed: January 9, 1922; 2003
- Employees: 397,264

Jurisdictional structure
- Operations jurisdiction: Iraq
- Governing body: Ministry of Interior
- General nature: Gendarmerie; Local civilian police

The Iraqi Police (Arabic: الشرطة العراقية), officially part of the General Directorate of Public Security (Arabic: مديرية الأمن العام), is the primary civilian law enforcement agency under the authority of the Ministry of Interior responsible for maintaining internal security and enforcing law and order throughout Iraq.

== History ==
The current Iraqi Police has some links with the pre-war Iraqi police service, which was professional and low in repression priority. Therefore, the police were expected to remain cohesive and to be a useful instrument after the invasion as well.

It was intended to form the basis for the police force of the new Iraq, but the civil disorder caused this project to be abandoned. Following the emergency stipend payment, some police came back especially in Baghdad and the U.S. Army military police conducted emergency training. At the same time, in the south the British forces began to establish local police forces in coordination with Shiite religious leaders.

In the north, Kurdish security forces did not experience any interruption, and in Mosul a thousand former police officers were hired by Major General David Petraeus to maintain the public order.

In the meantime, the Coalition Provisional Authority worked with the renewed Ministry of Interior to purge Baathist officials (7,000 police officers fired by Bernard Kerik only in Baghdad) and to establish a police forces in short terms. In the first four months, the first training course was launched and over 4,000 officers were trained. In 2003 recruitment, applicants were mostly former soldiers and police officers who served under the Baathist rule. At the end of 2003, Iraqi Police formally totalled 50,000 officers.

== Sections ==
- Special Tasks And Duties
- Traffic department
- Police department
- Department of research and investigation
- Criminal evidence department

== Organization and oversight ==
In 2009 the Iraqi Police was under the command of Major General Hussein Jassim Alawadi. The Multi-National Security Transition Command – Iraq (MNSTC-I) was a United States Central Command organisation tasked to train, mentor and equip all Iraqi civilian security forces. MNSTC-I also had the goal of training their counterparts in the Iraqi government of Iraq to assume their role. MNSTC-I was dissolved in 2010.

The Iraqi Police had three main branches:

- Iraqi Police Service: Uniformed organisation tasked with the general patrol of Iraq's cities and incident response
- Federal Police: Paramilitary organisation designed to bridge the gap between the police and the army. It responds to domestic incidents beyond the capabilities of the IPS, but not severe enough for the Iraqi Army. The FP originated as the Special Police (SP) on August 15, 2004, to provide national rapid-response capability to counter armed insurgency, large-scale civil disobedience and riots. In 2005, the Ministry of the Interior consolidated its ad-hoc Police Battalions into the Emergency Response Unit (a SWAT unit), the 8th Police mechanised brigade (3 motorised battalions), the Public Order Division (4 brigades/12 battalions), and the Special Police Commando Division (4 brigades/12 battalions). It became the Iraq National Police (NP) March 30, 2006, and on August 1, 2009, the NP was renamed as the Federal Police.

By 2012–13 there were four Federal Police Divisions, spread out around the country. The 1st and 2nd Motorized Divisions were headquartered in Baghdad and created out of the former Commando Division and the Public Order Division. The 3rd Federal Police Division, under the auspices of the Ninewa Operational Command with its headquarters in Mosul, collapsed in the ISIS 2014 Northern Iraq offensive by June 9. The 4th Division was headquartered in Basra. Some reinforcing units, such as the 9th Brigade, 4th Federal Police Division, also withered once deployed to the front lines.

- Supporting forces: Remaining supporting organisations, primarily the Department of Border Enforcement (tasked with securing Iraq's borders and ports of entry) and the Iraqi Prison Service. The Facilities Protection Service protects buildings owned by the Iraqi government.

== Uniforms ==
The Iraqi Police Service uniform consists of a long-sleeved, light-blue shirt with a blue brassard on the left arm with an embroidered Iraqi flag and "Iraqi Police" embossed in English and Arabic, black or light-blue trousers or blue combat trousers similar to those of the United States Navy. They wear a dark-blue baseball cap with "POLICE" in white letters or body armour and a PASGT helmet.

Federal Police wear a black-and-blue camouflage uniform similar to the U.S. Army Combat Uniform Universal Camouflage Pattern, which includes a baseball cap, body armour and PASGT helmet. FP uniforms are issued when an officer has completed training; officers not yet trained wear a variety of uniforms, including woodland camouflage. FP officers are organised into brigades which cover geographic areas. Rank insignia for the IP is nearly identical to that of the Iraqi Army, except that the shoulder boards are usually dark blue.

== Ranks ==
Officers ranks and ranks of NCOs and constables are the same that of Iraqi army, from highest to lowest, with symbol on epaulette, as below:

=== Insignia ===
Commissioned Officers

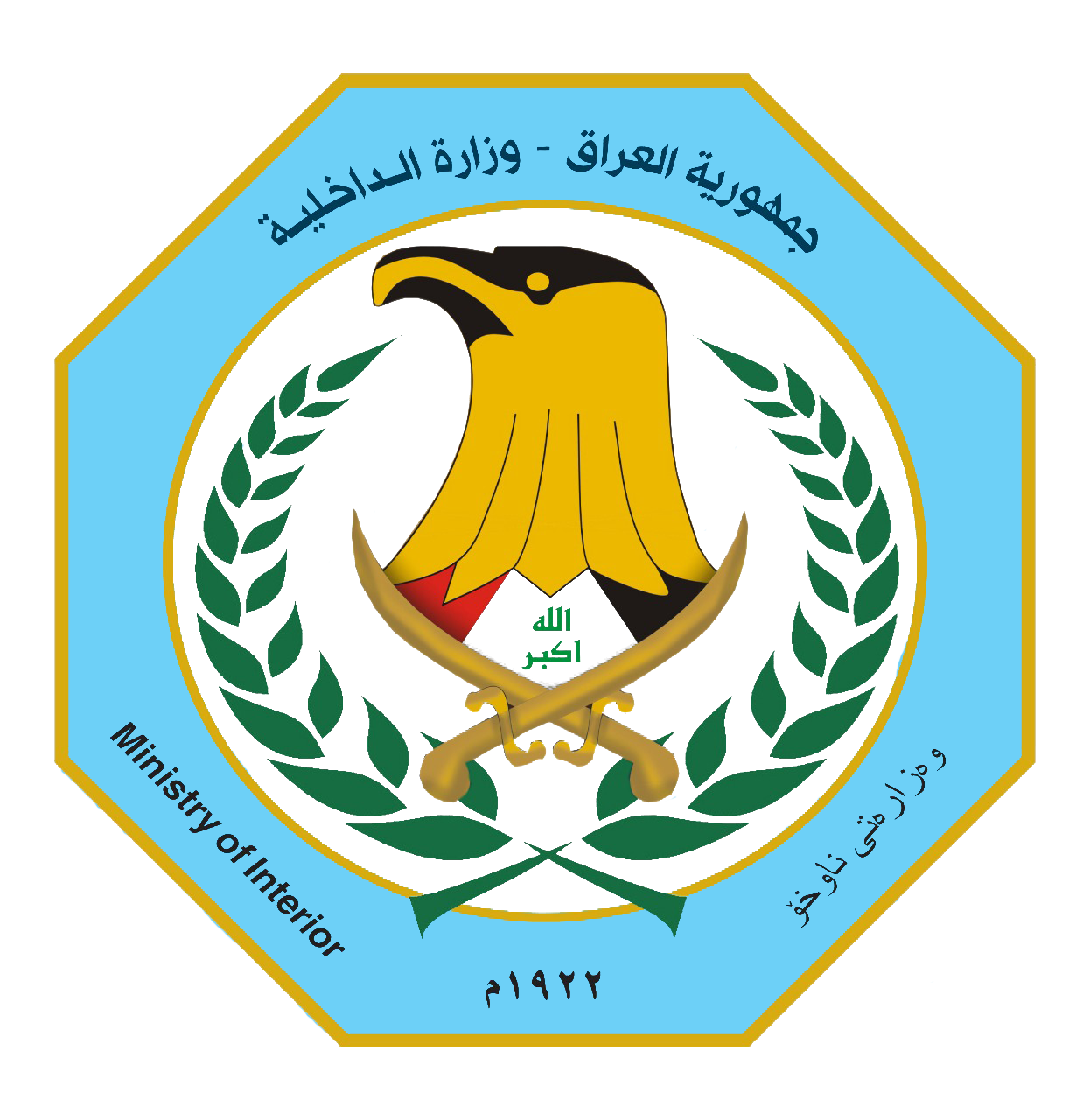
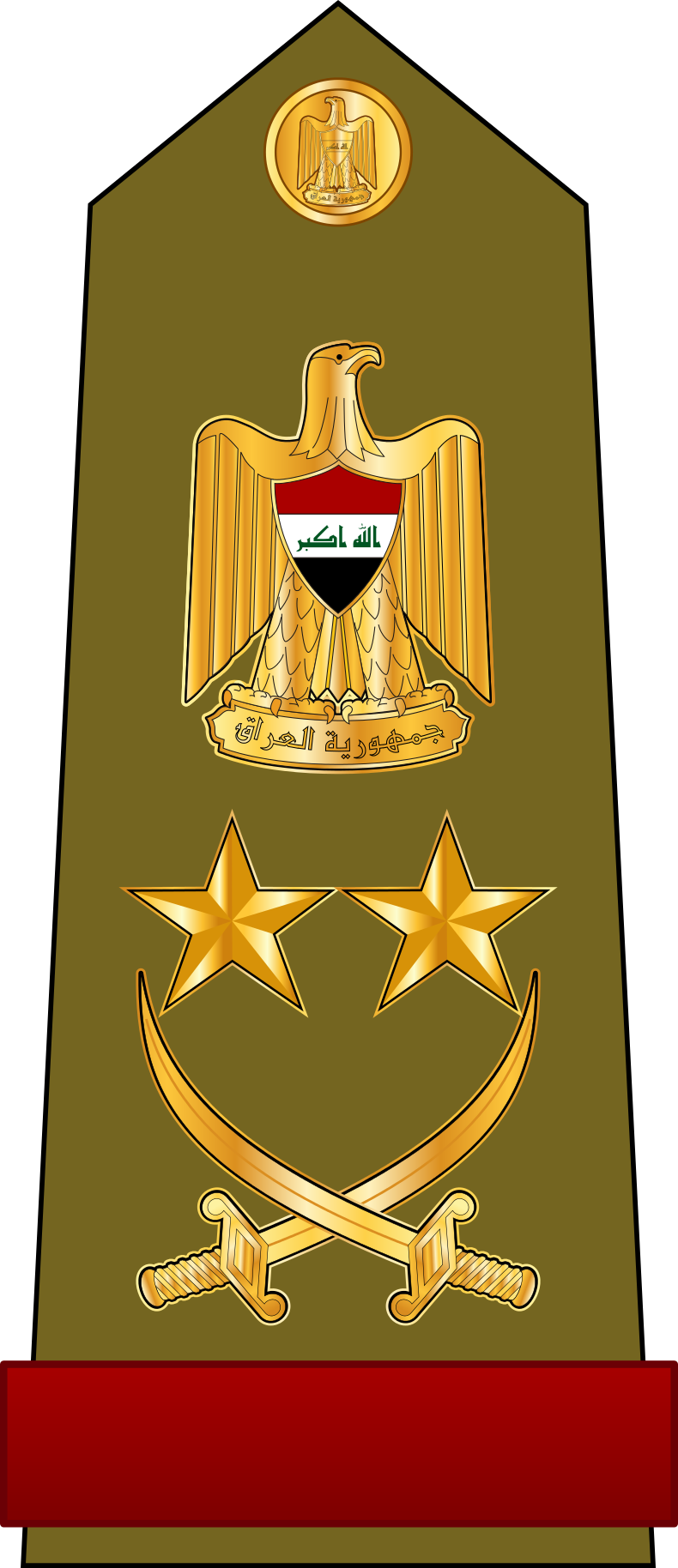
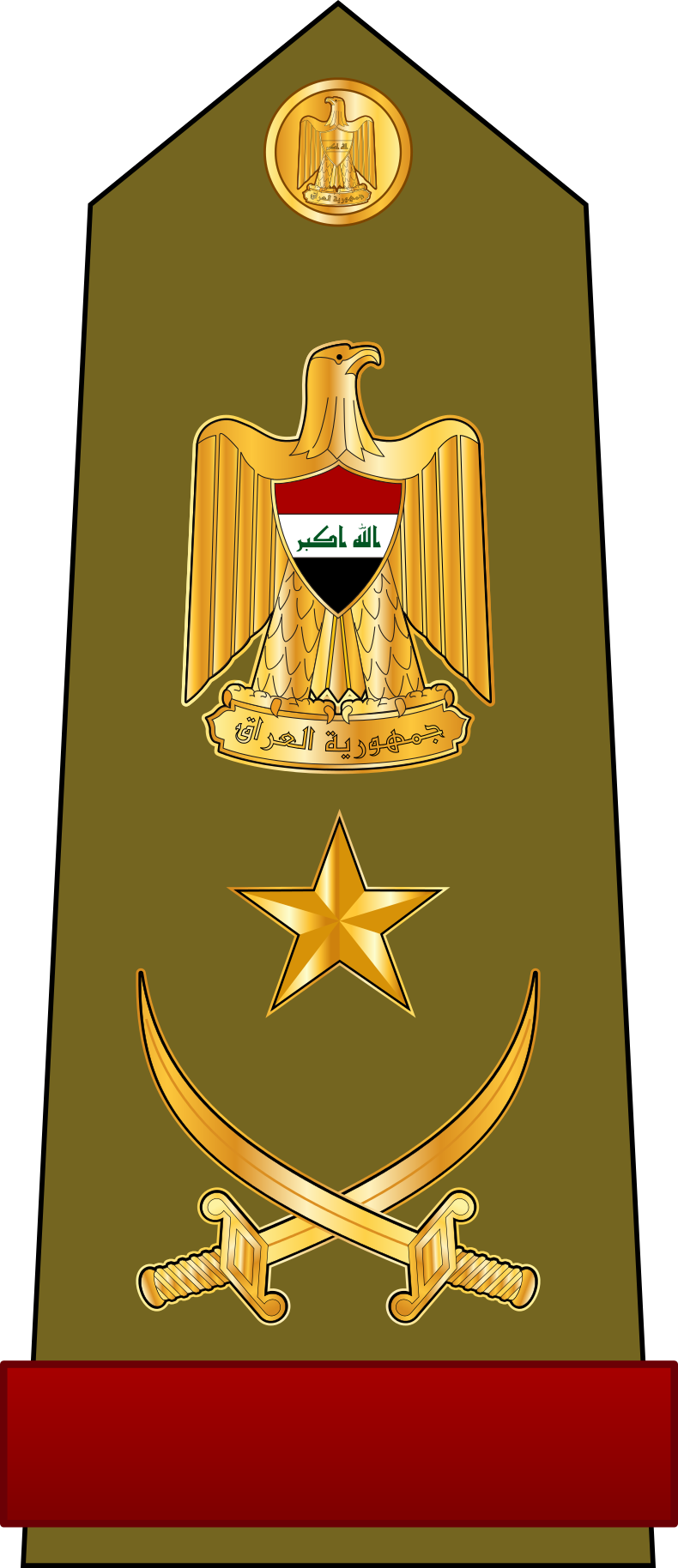
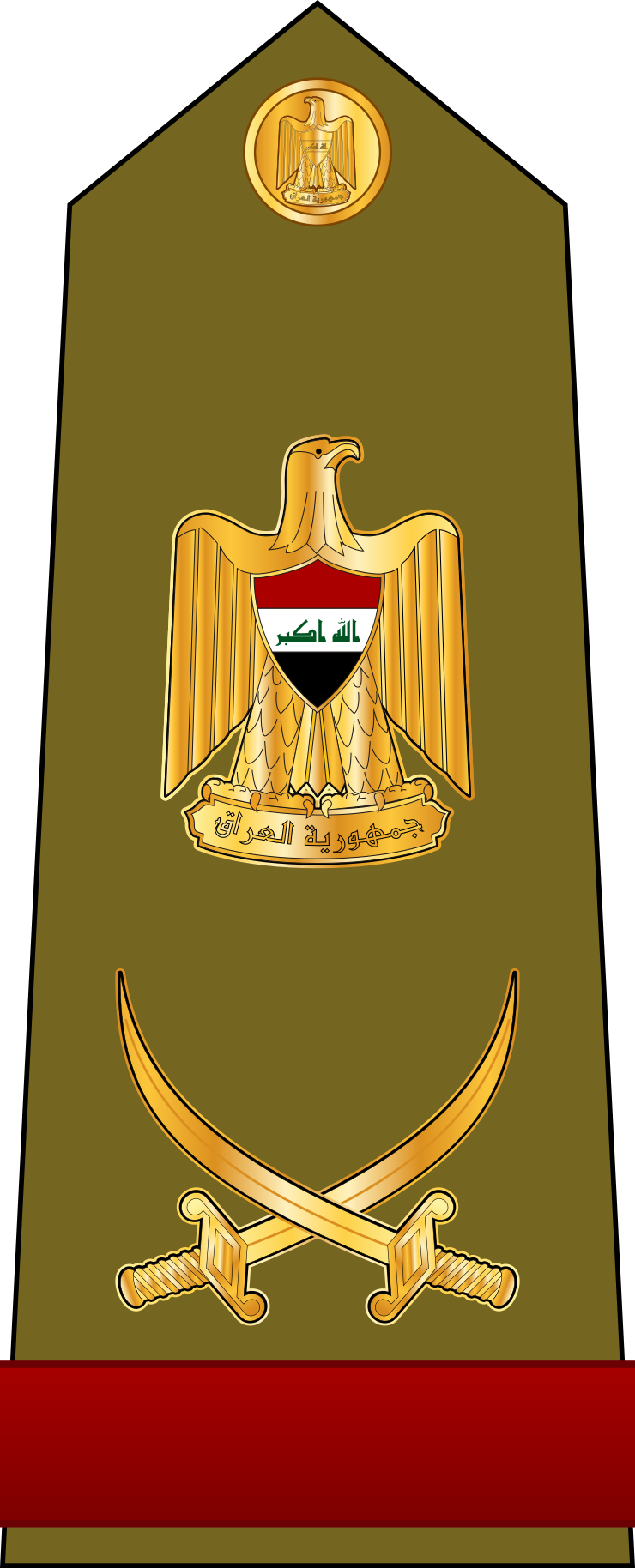
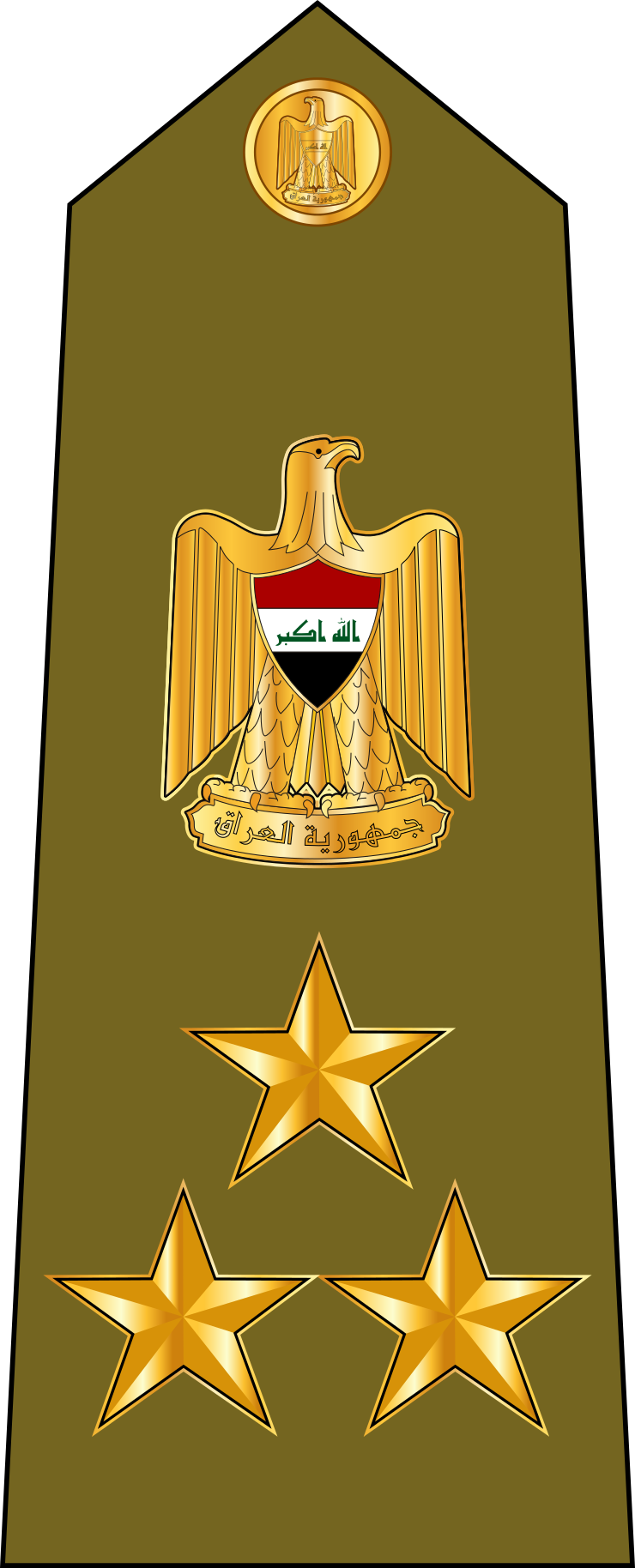
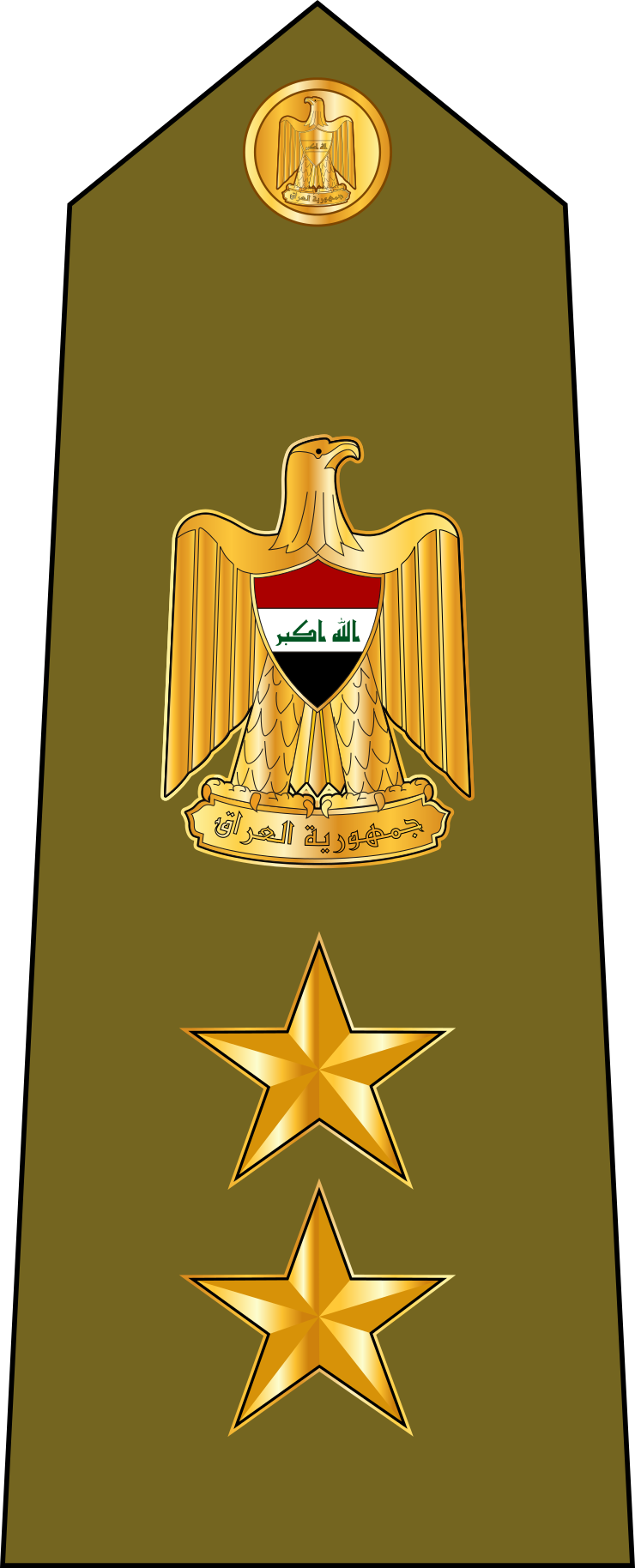
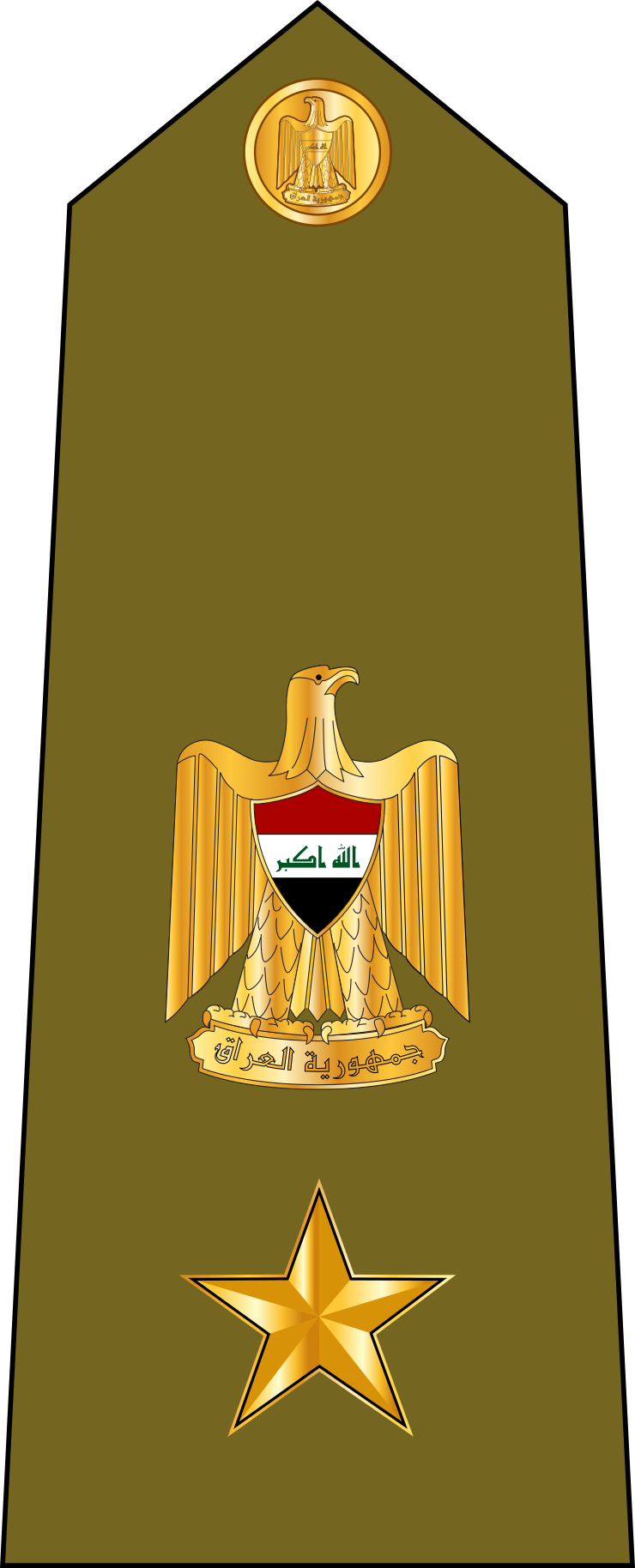
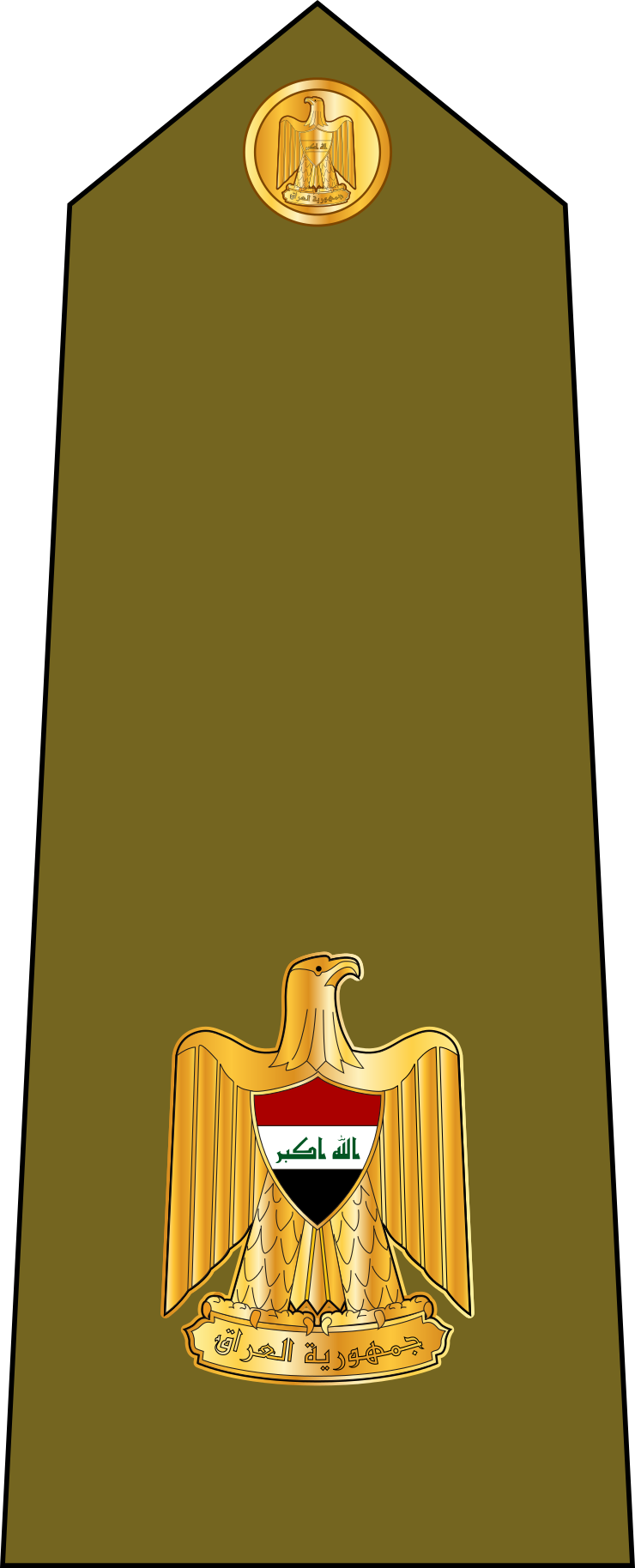
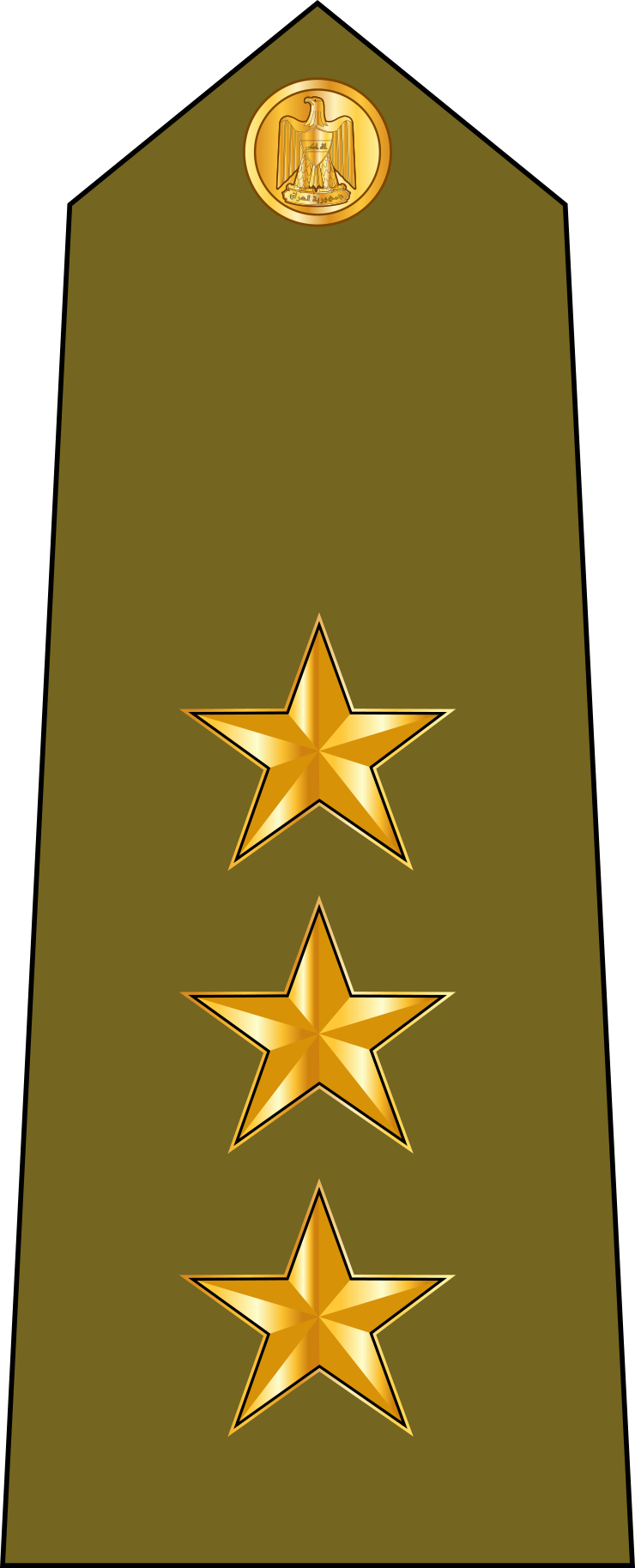
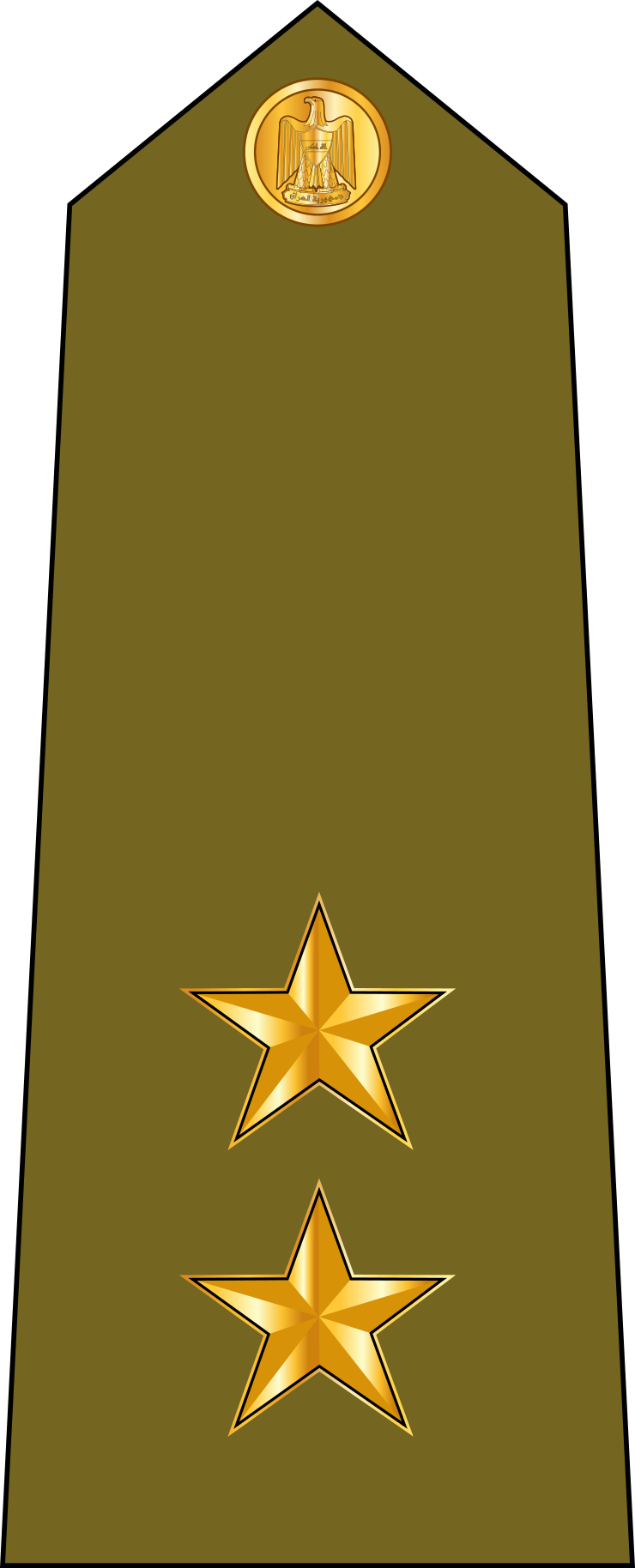
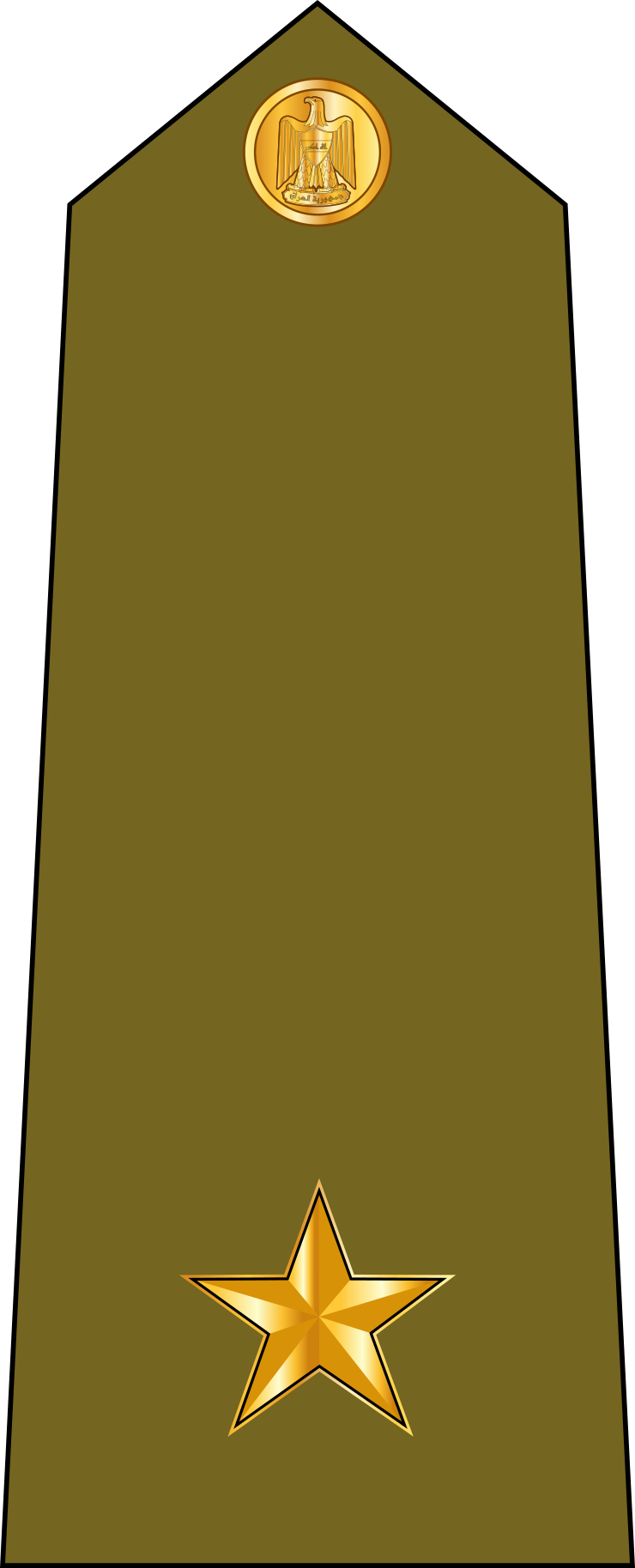
Rank group	General / flag officers					Senior officers			Junior officers
Iraqi Police
Iraqi Police	General	Lieutenant General	Major General	Brigadier	Colonel	Lieutenant Colonel	Major	Captain	First Lieutenant	Lieutenant

Warrant Officers

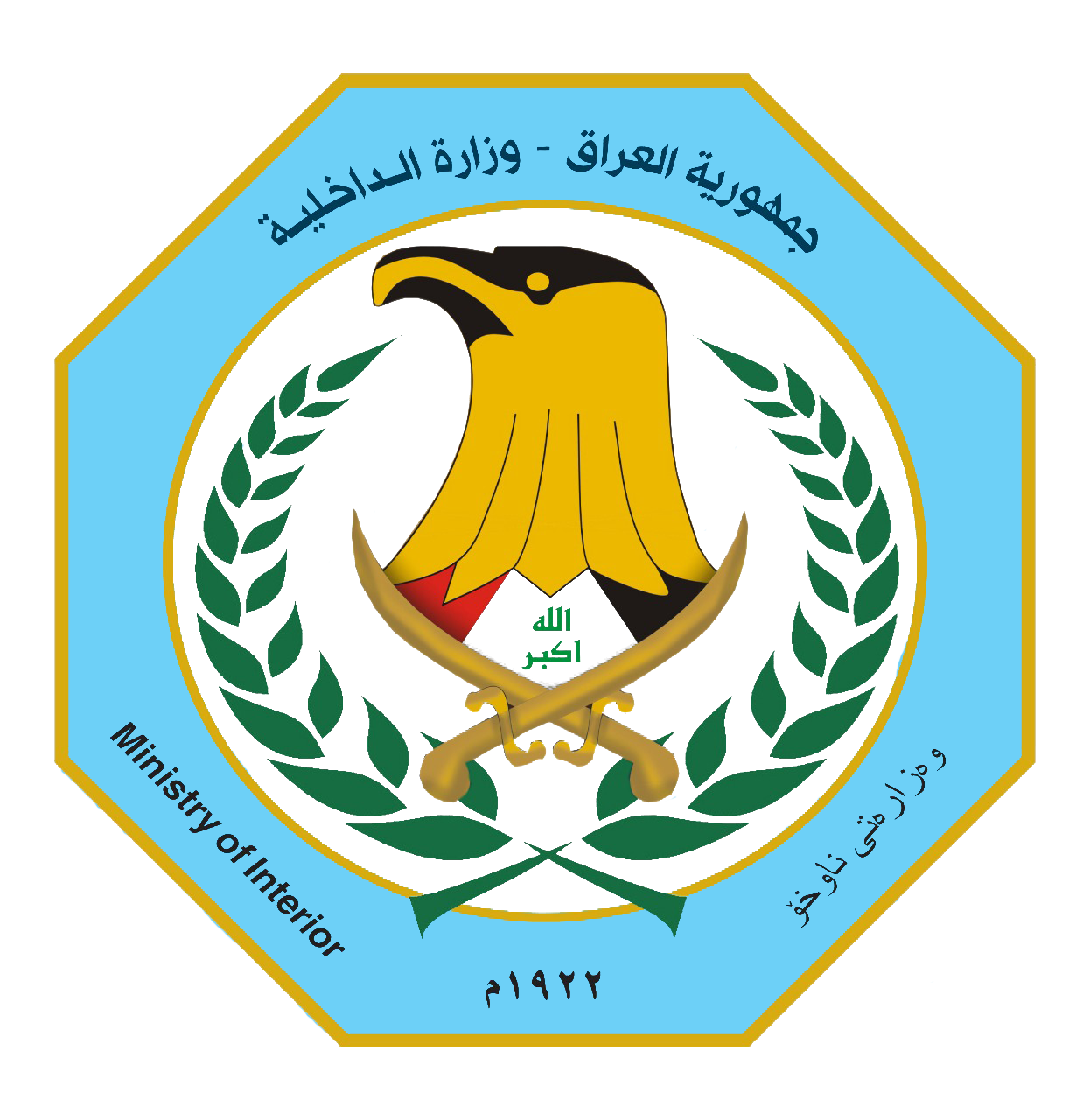
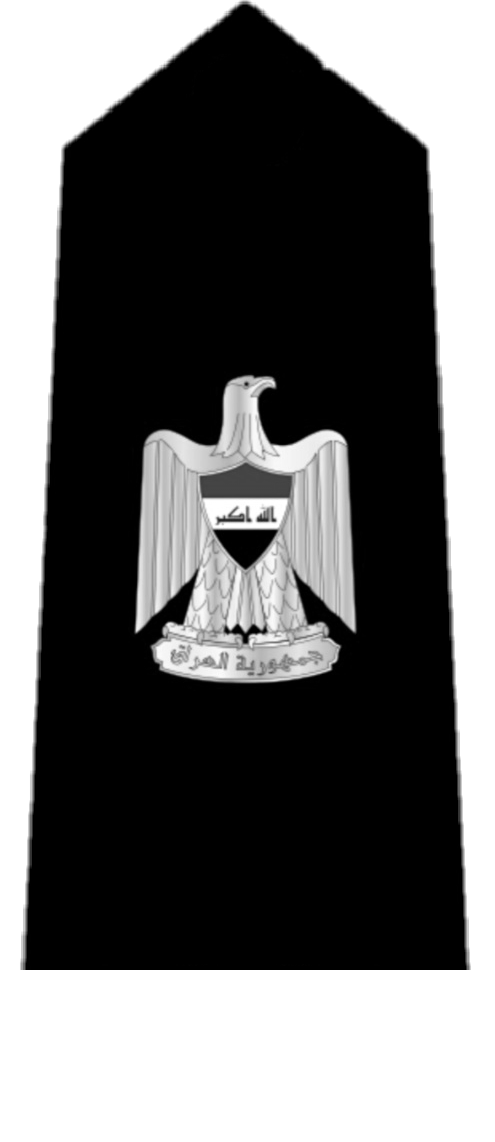
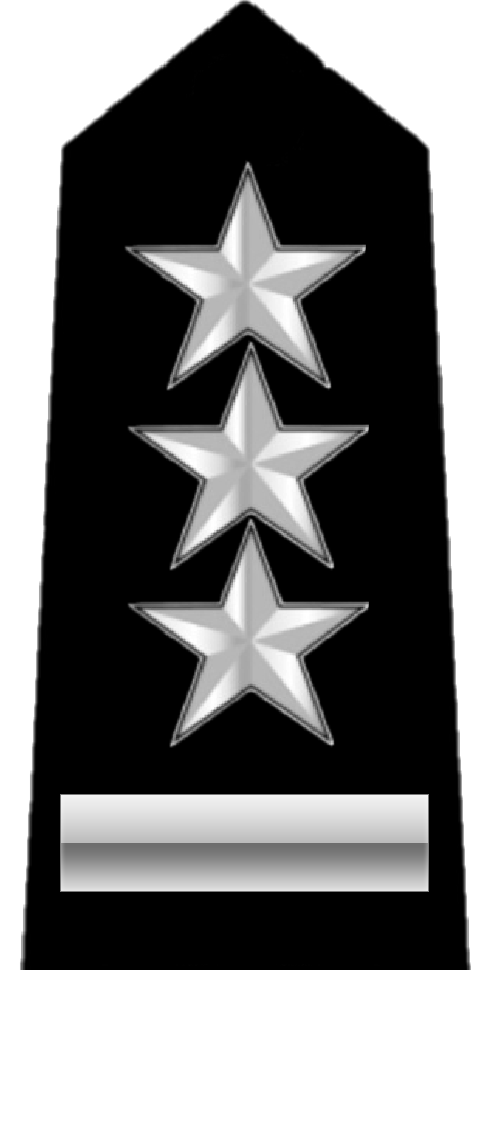
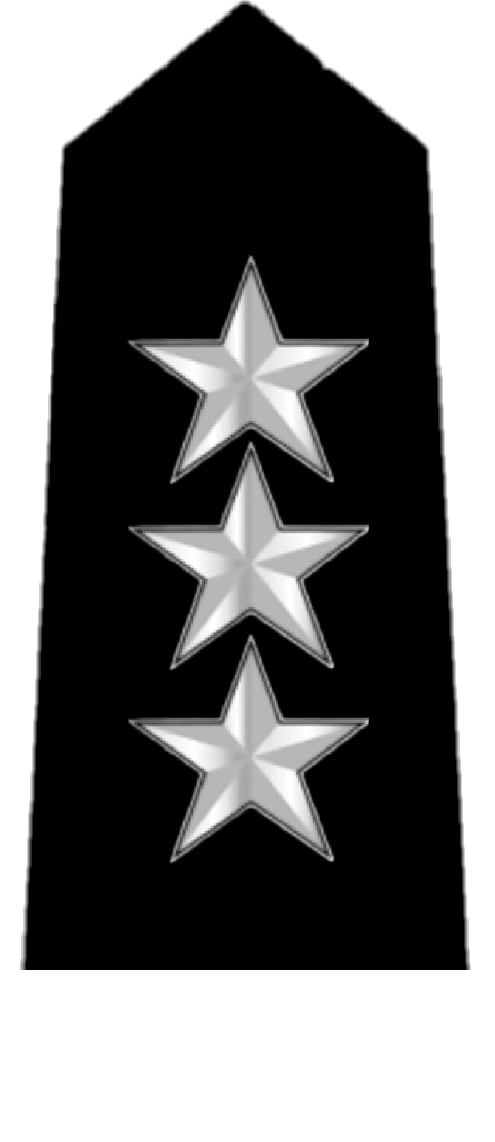
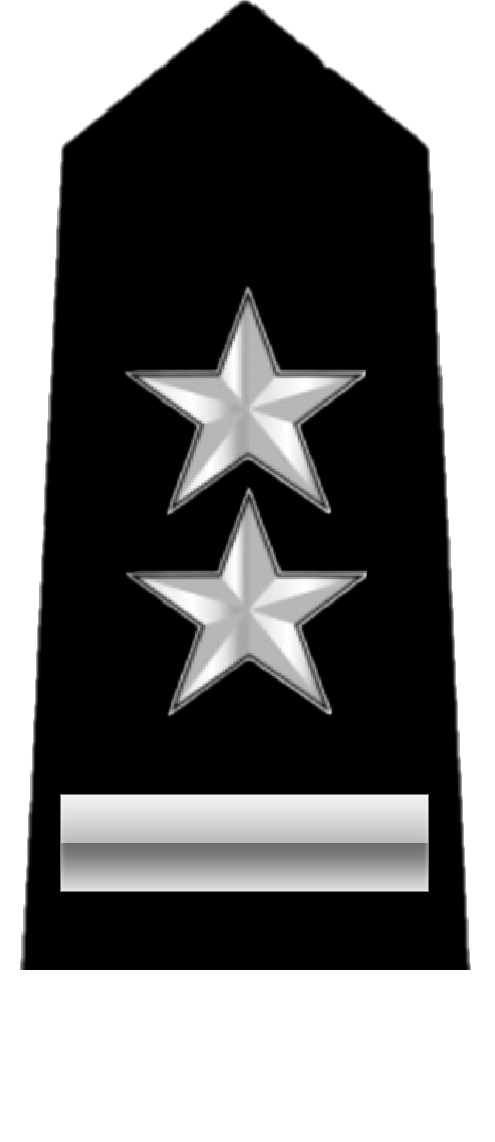
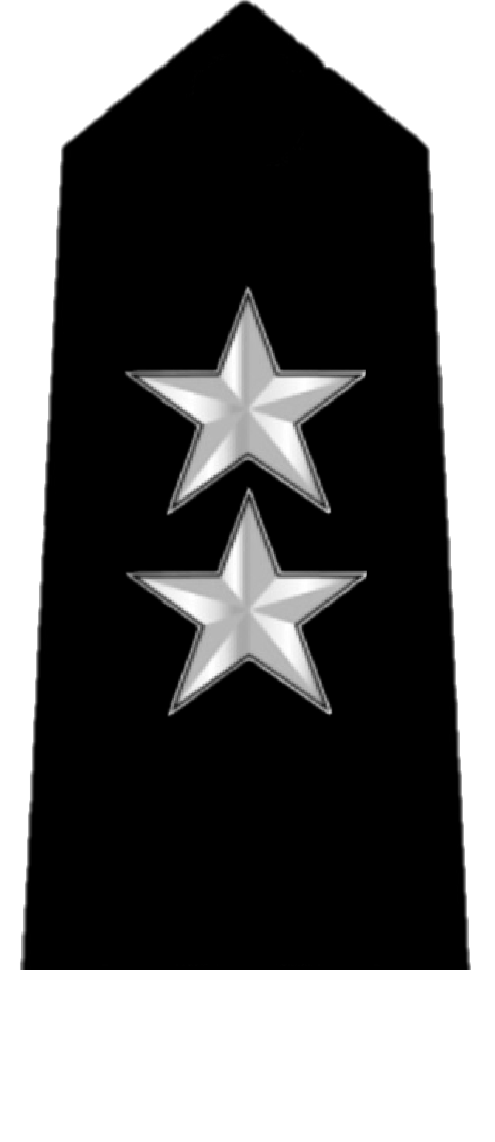
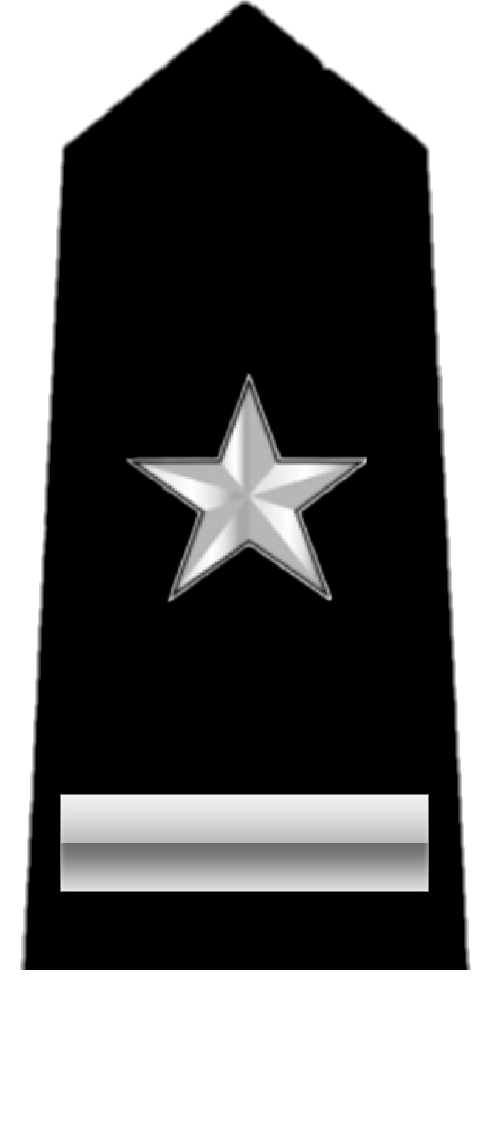
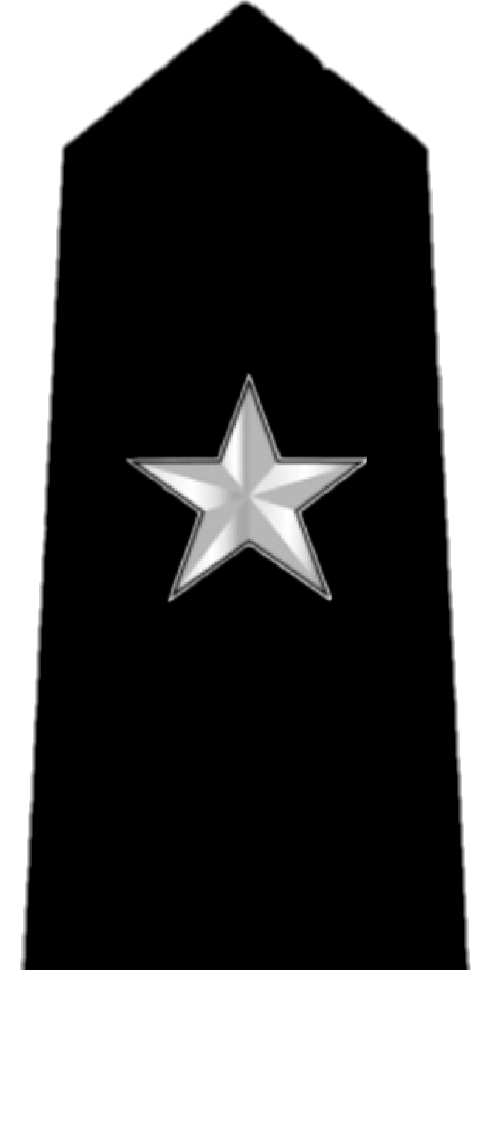
	Warrant Officer
Iraqi Police
Iraqi Police	Warrant Officer (1st Class)	Warrant Officer (2nd Class)	Warrant Officer (3rd Class)	Warrant Officer (4th Class)	Warrant Officer (5th Class)	Warrant Officer (6th Class)	Warrant Officer (7th Class)

Enlisted

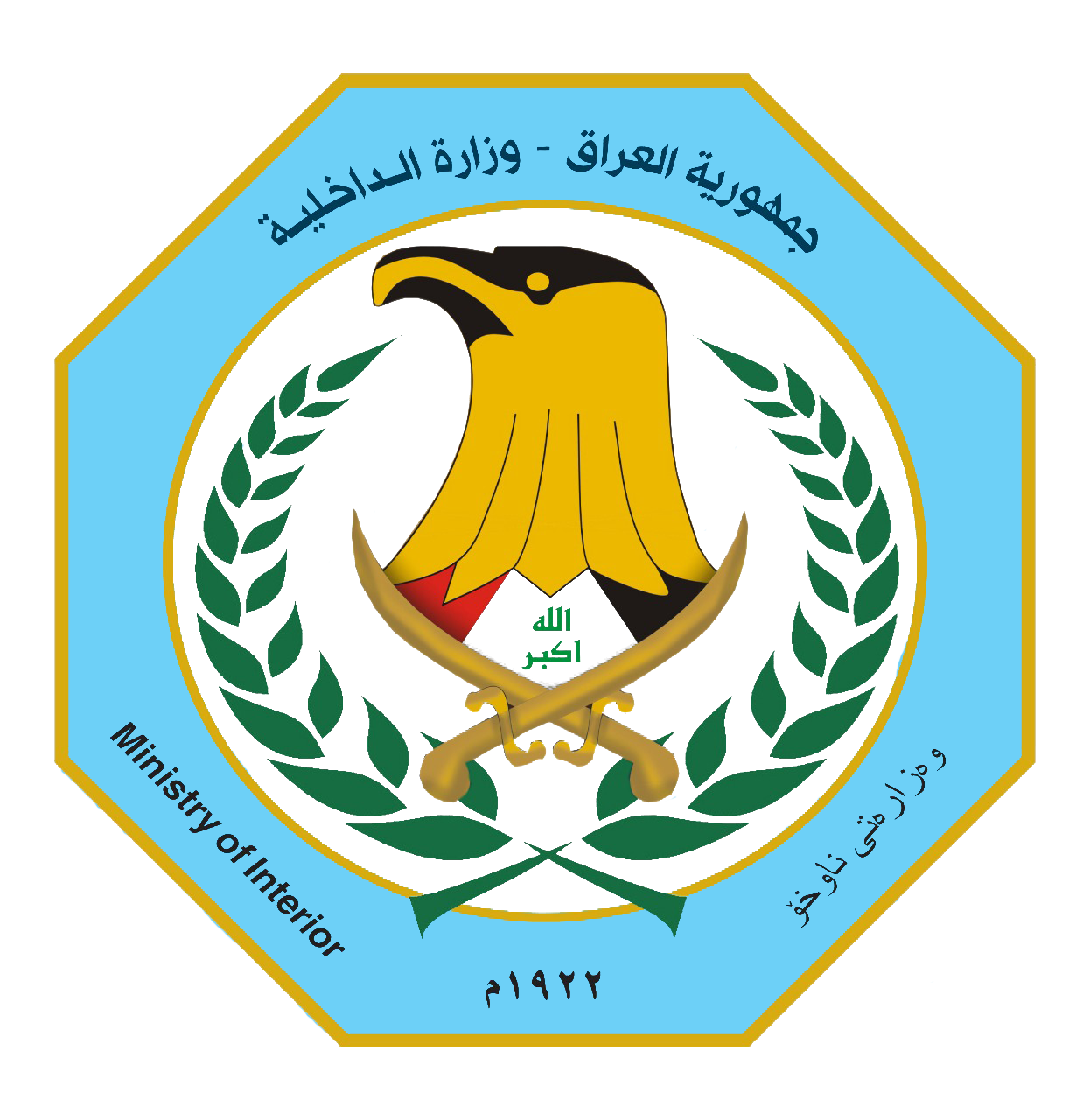
	Constabulary ranks
Iraqi Police
Iraqi Police	Staff Seargent	Seargent	Corporal	Policeman; 1st Class	Policeman

== Controversies ==
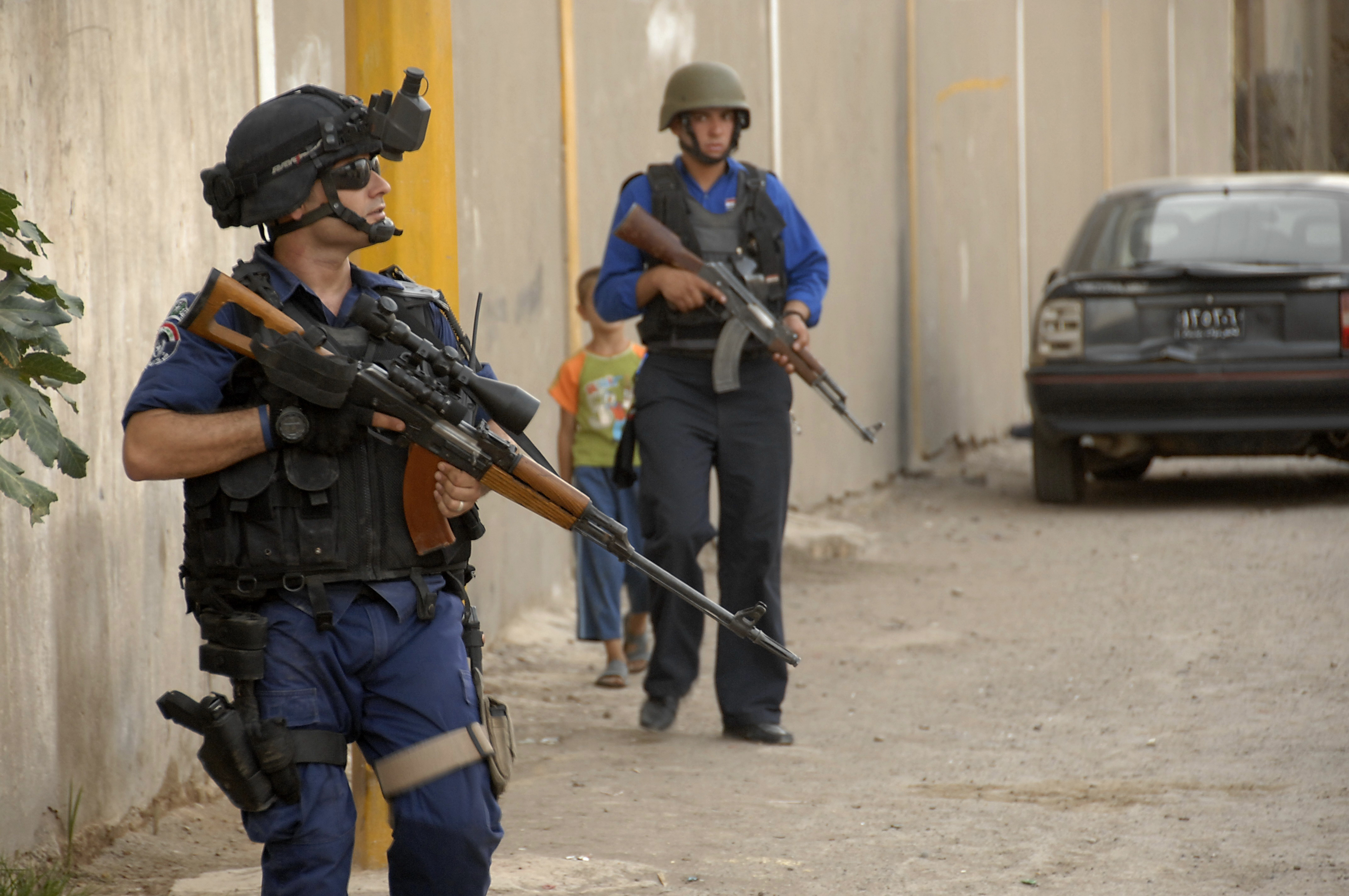
An Iraqi police officer armed with a Tabuk sniper rifle.

The Iraqi Police has faced a number of problems since it was reformed by the Coalition Provisional Authority after the fall of Baghdad. It became the target of fighters from inside and outside Iraq; thousands of officers had been killed by gunfire and bombings by Iraqi insurgents, foreign terrorists and, in some cases, friendly fire from Coalition troops. An estimated 4,250 Iraqi police officers were killed from January 2005 and March 4, 2006. Due to high unemployment in Iraq, many young Iraqi men had volunteered to join the police forces. A number of recruits had been killed by suicide bombers and suicide car bombs while queuing at police stations.

The Iraqi Police had also been infiltrated by insurgents, who used their access to privileged information, training and weapons for their own motives. Many police stations had been attacked and blown up by Insurgents, with weapons stolen from them. Police stations have also been occupied by anti-Iraqi government insurgents. As a result, many police officers abandoned their posts in response. From the 2003 Battle of Baghdad till October 7, 2006, 12,000 Iraqi Policemen had deserted and 4,000 had been killed.

On August 17, 2016, a market owner was killed by a police officer after a brawl began when the market owner "refused to back his vehicle" in Baghdad.

== Iraqi government ==
The Iraqi government has been accused of using (or allowing) the police and other groups to carry out sectarian killings and kidnappings of Sunni Iraqis. In December 2005, US troops found 625 inmates held in "very overcrowded" conditions in a Baghdad Interior Ministry building. Twelve of the prisoners reportedly had signs of torture and malnutrition. The story gave credence to the accusations, sowing further distrust of the police force. A report into the findings at the building was promised by Iraqi president Ibrahim Jaafari at the end of December 2005, but as of May 4, 2006, no report was issued.

The United States Department of State released a 2006 human rights report accusing the Iraqi police of widespread atrocities. In October of that year, the Iraqi government dismantled a police brigade with connections to sectarian death squads. The dismantled brigade was transferred to a US base for retraining. Other police brigades will be investigated for links to death squads.

== Deaths ==
Iraqi Interior Minister Jawad al-Bulani announced that as of December 24, 2005, 12,000 police officers in Iraq died in the line of duty since the 2003 US-led invasion.

== Transition teams ==
Large-scale operations were conducted by coalition forces to assist in policing and train the Iraqi Police (IP) and security forces. Police transition teams (PTTs) are US military-police squads deployed to Iraqi Police stations. The teams conduct joint patrols with the IP, share station defense and gather station information and counter-terrorism intelligence. The joint patrols of the PTTs have helped curb violence, increasing respect for Iraq's police force. These duties were later performed by United States Air Force Security Forces members. An International Police Liaison Officer (IPLO), an experienced US police officer, accompanied most of the transition teams to aid post-academy training of the IP.

National Police Transition Teams (NPTT) are 11-man military transition teams embedded in Iraqi Police units at the battalion, brigade, division and corps levels. These teams are supplied by the US Army and the US Marine Corps. Like the PTTs, each team is assisted by an IPLO and one to six local interpreters.

== Equipment ==
Members of the Iraqi Police use the Glock 19 and HS2000 handgun, and may carry a shotgun, Type 81, or AK-47 rifle on patrol. Iraqi Federal Police have also been seen using the Croatian-made HS Produkt VHS-2 bullpup carbine during military operations against ISIS in northern Iraq. For marine operations, the police are equipped with Safe Boat International 230 T-Top patrol boats.
