= Ministry of Interior (Iraq) =

Government ministry of Iraq

Republic of Iraq Ministry of Interior
- وزارة الداخلية
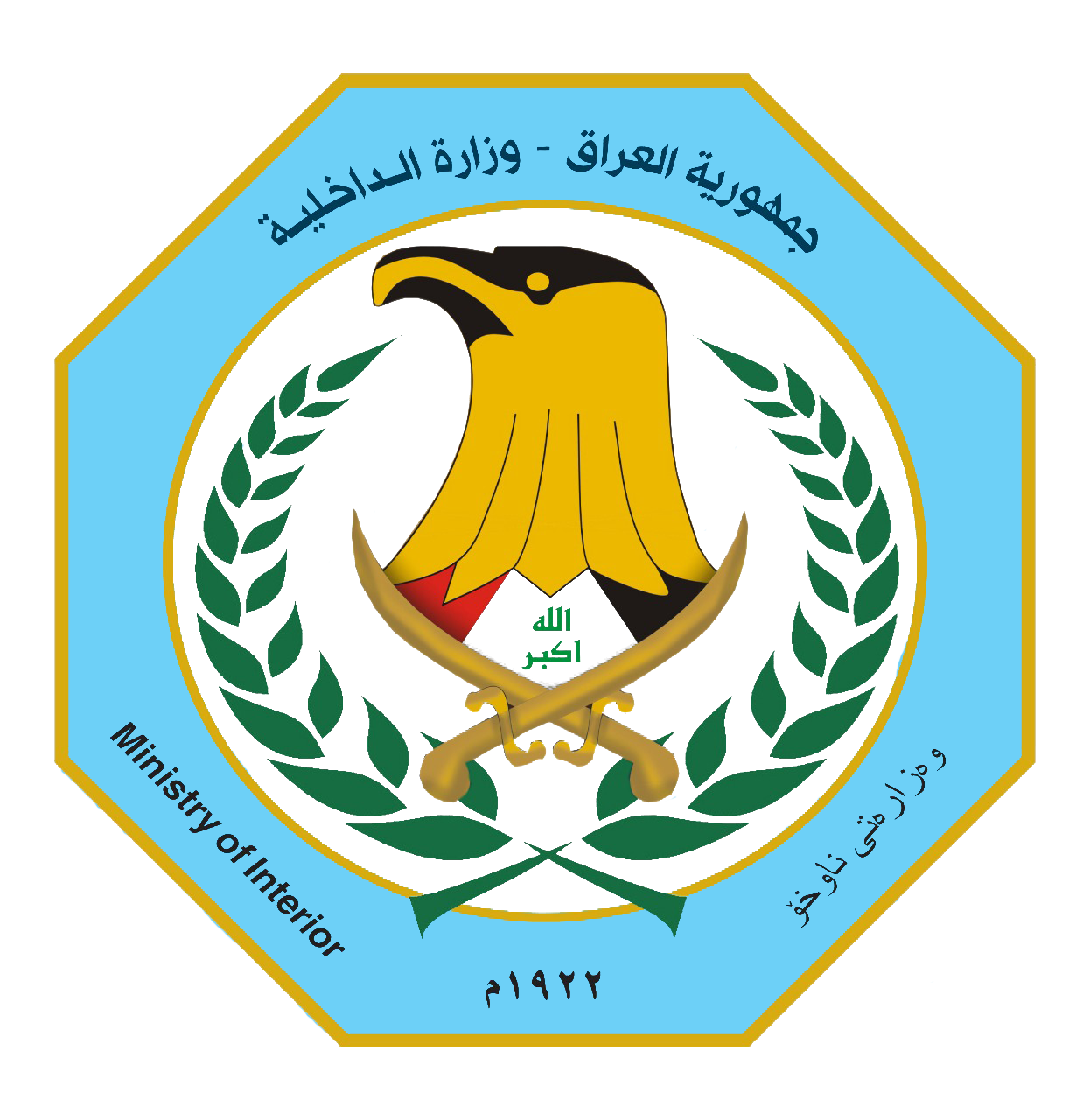

Agency overview
- Employees: 380,430
- Annual budget: $3.8 billion
- Minister responsible: Yassir al-Maliki
- Website: www.moi.gov.iq

The Ministry of Interior (MOI) is the government body charged with overseeing policing and border control in Iraq. The MOI comprises several agencies, including the Iraqi Police, Highway Patrol, Traffic Department, Emergency Response Unit, Explosive Ordnance Disposal Unit, and Department of Border Enforcement. Following passage of the Facilities Protection Service Reform Law, the Ministry absorbed FPS personnel previously spread among other ministries. The MOI has approximately 380,430 employees, and the Ministry of Finance approved US$3.8 billion for its 2008 budget, representing a 21% growth over the previous year.

== History ==
Former Police Forces flag of the MoI, used during the Ba'athist era

Under President Saddam Hussein, the ministry performed a wide range of functions, including keeping Iraq free of Hussein's enemies and others deemed "undesirable." When U.S.-led Coalition forces found and captured Hussein during the Iraq War, the ministry was not dissolved, unlike the defense ministry and intelligence agencies. Combined Joint Task Force 7 planned to hand over policing and internal security duties as soon as possible. Instead, the ministry was merely restructured.

Among the first units established by the new administration was the Special Police Commandos. They were a counter-insurgency unit answering to the Ministry of the Interior. In June 2004, the CPA transferred sovereignty to the Iraqi Interim Government. Under the new Prime Minister, Ayad Allawi, the CPA appointed a new interior minister, Falah al-Naqib. After the poor performance of the police in battles against Shiite cleric Muqtada al-Sadr's Mahdi Army, Al-Naqib sought to provide the MOI with effective Iraqi constabulary forces. Al-Naqib created “commando units” of former soldiers from elite units such as Saddam's Republican Guard. These units, commanded by al-Naqib's uncle, Adnan Thabit, a former army general, were personally loyal to the minister. The commandos were trained initially without U.S. involvement. They were under MOI control, and were outside the scope of the U.S. Civilian Police Assistance Training Team (CPATT) assistance program. The U.S. military provided arms and logistical support to these units, who proved to be effective under Minister al-Naqib's stewardship in fighting alongside U.S. forces against Sunni insurgents and Shiite militias. The existence of the unit was officially announced in September 2004 and numbered about 5,000 officers. Its principal U.S. adviser (Counselor) was Colonel James Steele, who also commanded the U.S. Military Advisory Group in El Salvador from 1984 through 1986. The Special Police Commando Division, Public Order Division, and Mechanized Police Brigade were merged in 2006 to form the National Police. The National Police has since expanded and been renamed the Federal Police.

On April 1, 2009, the Ministry of Interior was awarded the annual "Pigasus Award" by James Randi "For the funding organization that wasted the most money on pseudo-science... Iraq's Interior Ministry had, by the end of 2009, spent US$85,000,000 on a dowsing rod called the ADE 651. (Each individual unit cost up to $60,000.) Despite an international uproar and continual car bomb detonations in Iraq, they were still being used, and the Ministry was still defending its decision to buy them [in 2009]. A New York Times report from October 2009 asserted "pervasive" corruption within the Ministry. In 2010, the British businessman who exported the device was arrested by the British police for fraud. In February 2011, General al-Jabiri was arrested on corruption charges, centering on the ADE 651 device purchase. He was subsequently convicted of taking millions of dollars of bribes from McCormick and was imprisoned along with two other Iraqi officials. Up to 15 Iraqis are said to have been on McCormick's payroll, receiving money through a bank in Beirut. In 2014, the ADE 651 was still in use at Iraqi checkpoints, with a senior police officer defending their use, saying: "Don't listen to what people say about them or what reports media have on them. We would know best because we are the ones that are using them." Investigations by the BBC, U.S. Naval EOD Technology Division and other organizations have reported that these and similar devices are fraudulent and little more than "glorified dowsing rods" with no ability to perform claimed functions. In July 2016, Prime Minister Haider al-Abadi issued an executive order banning the use of the device, and in 2020, the Iraqi Commission of Integrity announced that an individual responsible for equipping the Ministry of Interior with the ADE 651 was sentenced to 7 years in prison for his involvement in the corruption scandal.

== Organization ==
=== Federal Police (FP) ===
The Federal Police (FP), sometimes called the National Police, is a gendarmerie-type paramilitary force designed to bridge the gap between the local police and the army. This allows the MOI to project power across provinces and maintain law and order, while an effective community police is developed. Although called police, the force has been trained primarily for military operations.

Amid frequent allegations of abuse and other illegal activities, in the fall of 2006 the Iraqi government decided to reform and retrain all FP units. The FP transformation yielded a police organization capable of performing criminal investigations as well as tactical operations, and included a reorganization that resulted in the replacement of two division headquarters with a federal police headquarters.

FP units are equipped with small arms, machine guns, pick-up trucks, and SUVs. The mechanized battalions are equipped with light armored vehicles.

=== Department of Border Enforcement (DBE) ===
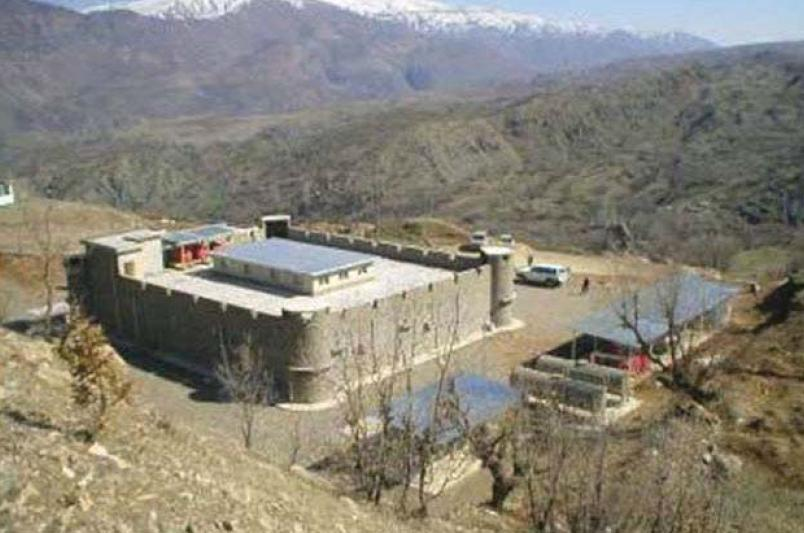
Mashan border fort in Sulaimaniyah

The DBE is tasked with securing and protecting Iraq's international borders from unlawful entry of both personnel and materiel. The DBE mans 405 border structures. As of March 2010, the DBE has approximately 40,000 personnel assigned, organized into 5 regions, 12 brigades and 38 battalions. The DBE was headquartered in Baghdad.

In late January 2009, three DBE brigades controlled the 1st Region, i.e. the northern parts of Iraq where the country shares borders with Turkey and Iran. It contains cities like Erbil, Duhok and Sulaymaniyah within the territory of the federal Kurdistan Region. These brigades, namely the 1st, 2nd, and 3rd were stationed in Duhok, Erbil and in Sulaymaniyah respectively. At the time, all three of these brigades were made up of Kurdish Peshmerga. In February 2024, the Ministry of Interior announced that a border guard brigade had been dispatched to secure the Iraqi–Turkish border in Duhok Governorate.

The city of Mosul is in the 2nd Region, Diyala in the 3rd Region, Basra in the 4th Region and the cities such as Najaf and Nakheb are in the 5th Region.

In October 2009 the 9th Brigade DBE was responsible for the Iranian border, and the 11th Brigade, responsible for the Saudi border, in Muthanna Governorate. The 15th DBE Brigade in Anbar Province was confirmed operational in January 2010. Both the DBE and the Department of Ports of Entry (POE) were supposed to be equipped with AK-47s, medium machine guns, body armors, medium pick-up trucks, mid-size Sport utility vehicles, generators and radios. Seven DBE brigades in southern Iraq survived the ISIS onslaught of the northern summer of 2014, but five brigades based largely on the Syrian border were disbanded.

=== Facilities Protection Service ===
The Facilities Protection Service has more than 150,000 personnel who work for 26 ministries and eight independent directorates. Anecdotal evidence suggests that some of them are unreliable and responsible for violent crimes. Former Prime Minister Maliki announced a reform to consolidate all Facilities Protection Service personnel into a unified organization responsible to the MOI. The Coalition stopped providing material and logistical support to the FPS in December 2005.

=== Federal Intelligence and Investigations Agency ===
The Federal Intelligence and Investigations Agency (FIIA) was founded in 2003 and is tasked with collecting intelligence pertinent to national security, as well as auditing, analysing, and producing reports regarding the fight against terrorism and organized crime. FIIA provides advice to decision makers at all times. It has three working directorates: Directorate of Intelligence and Counter-Terrorism, Directorate for Combating Organized Crime, and Directorate of Technologies and Informatics. The renowned Falcons Intelligence Cell is part of FIIA.

== List of Interior Ministers ==
Name	Portrait	Term of office		Political party	Prime Minister
Nuri Badran		September 2003	April 2004	Iraqi National Accord	Rotating
Samir Sumaidaie		April 2004	June 2004	Independent	Rotating
Falah Hassan al-Naqib		June 2004	April 2005	Iraqi National Accord	Ayad Allawi
Baqir Jabr al-Zubeidi		April 2005	20 May 2006	UIA/ISCI	Ibrahim al-Jaafari
Nouri al-Maliki		20 May 2006	8 June 2006	State of Law Coalition (Islamic Dawa Party)	Nouri al-Maliki
Jawad al-Bulani		8 June 2006	21 December 2010	Iraqi Constitutional Party	Nouri al-Maliki
Nouri al-Maliki		21 December 2010	8 September 2014	State of Law Coalition (Islamic Dawa Party)	Nouri al-Maliki
Mohammed Al-Ghabban		18 October 2014	8 July 2016	State of Law Coalition (Badr Organization)	Haider al-Abadi
Qasim al-Araji		30 January 2017	25 October 2018	State of Law Coalition (Badr Organization)	Haider al-Abadi
Adil Abdul-Mahdi (interim)		25 October 2018	24 June 2019	Supreme Islamic Iraqi Council	Adil Abdul-Mahdi
Yassin al-Yasiri		24 June 2019	6 May 2020	National Wisdom Movement	Adil Abdul-Mahdi
Othman al-Ghanmi		7 May 2020	28 October 2022	Independent	Mustafa Al-Kadhimi
Abdul Amir al-Shammari	Iraqi interior minister	28 October 2022	14 May 2026	Independent	Mohammed S. al-Sudani
Yassir al-Maliki		15 October 2026	incumbent	State of Law Coalition	Ali al-Zaidi

== See also ==
- Iraqi Federal Police
