= 1st Armored Division Artillery (United States) =

Divisional artillery command of the 1st Armored Division, US Army

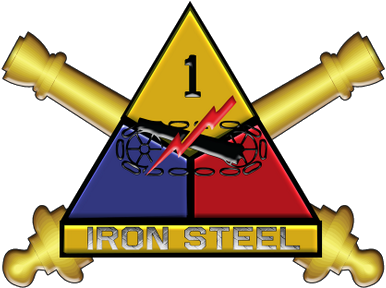
- Active: 1940–1946, 1951–1957, 1962–2007, 2014–present
- Country: United States of America
- Branch: United States Army
- Type: Field artillery
- Role: Division fires HQ
- Size: Brigade
- Part of: 1st Armored Division
- Garrison/HQ: Fort Bliss, TX
- Nickname: Iron Steel
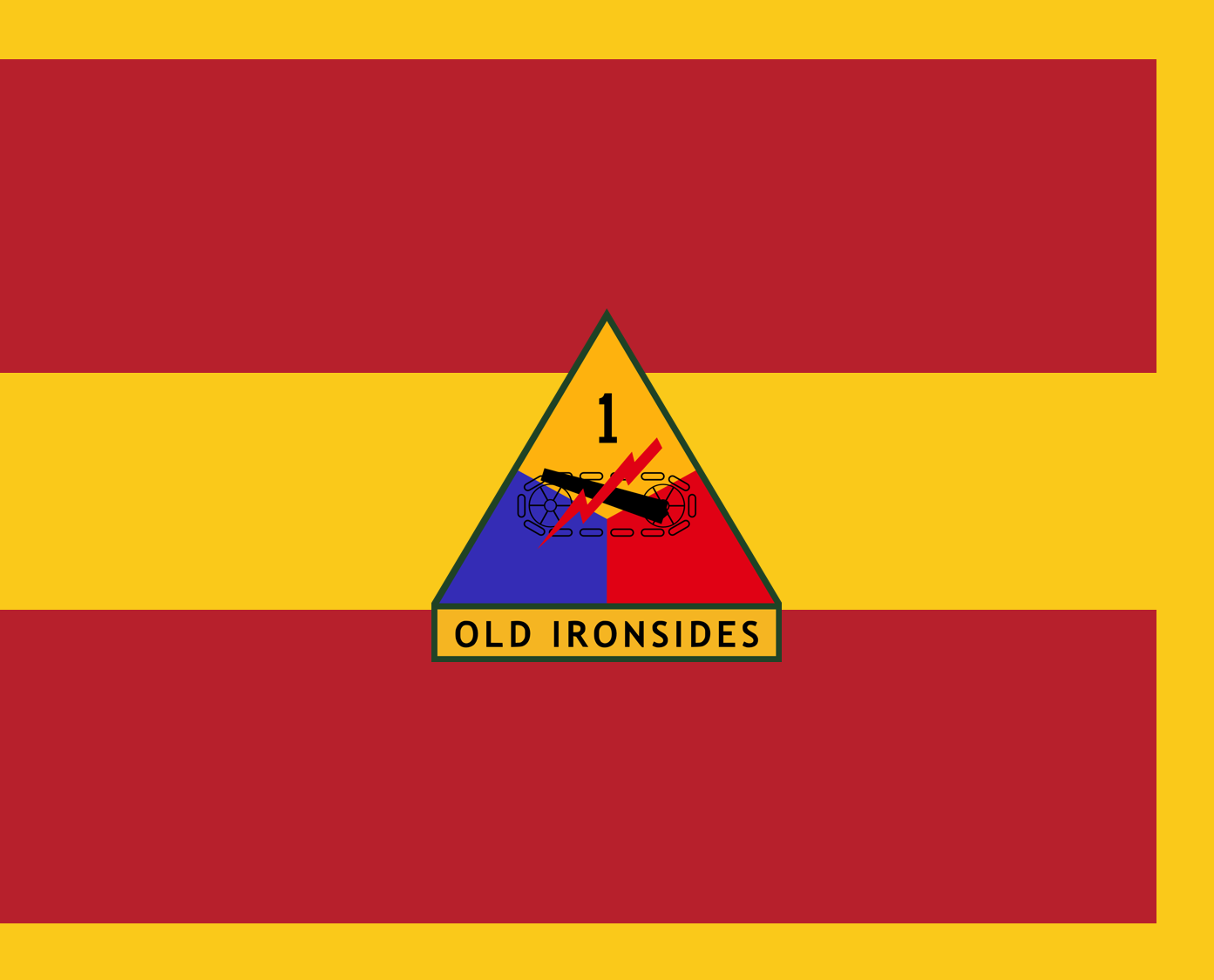
- Flag
- Equipment: M109A6/A7 Paladin

Commanders
- Current commander: COL Samuel "Joe" Nirenberg
- Command Sergeant Major: CSM Brandon Morey

The 1st Armored Division Artillery (DIVARTY) is the divisional artillery command for the 1st Armored Division at Fort Bliss, Texas. The DIVARTY has served with the division in World War II and the first Persian Gulf War, and in peacetime at Fort Hood, Fort Bliss, Fort Polk and Germany. The Division Artillery was inactivated in 2007 as part of transformation to modular brigade combat teams, but was reactivated in 2014 to provide fire support coordination and mission command for the training and readiness of field artillery units across the division.

== History ==
=== Cold War ===
1988 saw a major reflagging in the 1st Armored DIVARTY, with 1st Battalion, 22nd Field Artillery reflagging as 2nd Battalion, 1st Field Artillery; 2nd Battalion, 78th Field Artillery reflagging as 3rd Battalion, 1st Field Artillery; and 6th Battalion, 14th Field Artillery reflagging as 6th Battalion, 1st Field Artillery. The DIVARTY also contained a target acquisition battery (Battery B, 25th Field Artillery) and a separate MLRS battery (Battery A, 94th Field Artillery). The DIVARTY focused its training on three objectives:

- Improve agility through streamlined command and control
- Maneuver fires rapidly onto high-priority targets
- Concentrate training on predictive-fire gunnery fundamentals

The DIVARTY Interdiction and Counterfire Exercise (ICE) exercised multi-battalion mass live fires, while Exercise Ironstar focused on support to maneuver forces. During 1989, the DIVARTY continued ICE and Ironstar, as well as a conducting a Battle Command Training Program (BCTP) with the division.

=== Post Cold War ===
During 1990, the DIVARTY executed another ICE and participated in REFORGER 90. In late 1990, the DIVARTY deployed to Saudi Arabia in support of Operation Desert Shield, closing on 21 January 1991. As task organized for the conflict, the DIVARTY, commanded by COL Vollney B. Corn, consisted of its organic headquarters; 2nd Battalion, 1st Field Artillery; 3rd Battalion, 1st Field Artillery; Battery A, 94th Field Artillery (MLRS); and Battery B, 25th Field Artillery (Target Acquisition) (B/25th FA). In addition, the 2nd Battalion, 41st Field Artillery was attached from the 3rd Infantry Division Artillery and the 4th Battalion, 27th Field Artillery was attached from the 210th Field Artillery Brigade.

After participating in the 100-hour ground conflict and post-conflict stability operations, the DIVARTY redeployed to Germany in early May. As part of post-Cold War draw down, in 1991–1992, the 1st Armored DIVARTY inactivated its battalions, and reflagged the 8th Infantry Division Artillery, assuming command of the 2nd Battalion, 3rd Field Artillery; and 2nd, 4th and 6th Battalions, 29th Field Artillery, in addition to Battery C, 333rd Field Artillery replacing B/25th FA as the divisional target acquisition battery. During the divisional BCTP, the DIVARTY successfully tested an "artillery combat team" concept, employing an MLRS battalion and cannon battalion with a Bradley mechanized infantry security company, Stinger missile teams, and target acquisition radars under the control of the DIVARTY assault command post. The DIVARTY focused its training on artillery maneuver, gunnery and integration of fires. During 1993, the 6th Battalion, 29th Field Artillery upgraded its MLRS launchers to include ATACMS capability.

During 1994, the DIVARTY revised its Mission Essential Task List to focus on Operations Other Than War (OOTW) while continuing its training focus on artillery maneuver, gunnery and integration of fires. The DIVARTY was the first active division artillery to field the Initial Fire Support Automated System (IFSAS). As part of continued force reductions across the Army, the 2nd Battalion, 29th Field Artillery redeployed from Germany to Fort Lewis, Washington with the 3rd Brigade, 1st Armored Division, the brigade it habitually supported.

In 1995, the DIVARTY continued its training focus on artillery maneuver, gunnery and integration of fires. In July, the 6th Battalion, 29th Field Artillery inactivated, ending the U.S. Army's occupation of Strassburg Kaserne in Idar-Oberstein. To continue MLRS support to the division, the DIVARTY reactivated Battery A, 94th Field Artillery in May 1995. The 1994 focus on OOTW proved fortuitous, when the DIVARTY deployed with the division to Bosnia in December 1995. The DIVARTY was task organized for the operation with its organic headquarters; 2nd Battalion, 3rd Field Artillery; 4th Battalion, 29th Field Artillery; Battery A (MLRS), 94th Field Artillery; and Battery C (Target Acquisition), 333rd Field Artillery. The addition of two additional target acquisition batteries: Battery A, 25th Field Artillery (from the 41st Field Artillery Brigade) and Battery B, 25th Field Artillery (from the 1st Infantry Division Artillery) raised the DIVARTY's operational strength to over 2,300. The DIVARTY continued operations in Bosnia, including weekly howitzer platoon displacements and 2-gun raids to maintain fire support for maneuver operations. The DIVARTY also supported various multi-national units and conducted partnered training with the Nordic-Polish Brigade, a Russian mortar battery and a Turkish 155mm howitzer battery.

In 1997, the DIVARTY redeployed from Bosnia and executed a re-training program of command post exercises, including Operation Victory Strike, a corps BCTP focused on high intensity conflict. The battalions also conducted field artillery live fires and multinational exercises and demonstrations. The 4th Battalion, 29th Field Artillery reflagged as the 4th Battalion, 27th Field Artillery and Battery C, 333rd Field Artillery reflagged as Battery C, 25th Field Artillery. The DIVARTY returned to Bosnia in the fall and winter of 1997. The DIVARTY Headquarters remained deployed to Bosnia through June 1998, controlling two fire support elements for two brigades and an organic firing battery, as well as two firing batteries from 2nd Armored Cavalry Regiment and additional Army National Guard elements. The two cannon battalions fielded the M109A6 Paladin howitzer, with 4th Battalion, 27th Field Artillery completing training in May and 2nd Battalion, 3rd Field Artillery completing training in July. The DIVARTY then again returned to training for high intensity conflict, participating in Operation Rolling Steel 98, the largest maneuver rights exercise in Germany since 1990.

== Lineage and honors ==
=== Lineage ===
- Constituted 15 July 1940 in the Regular Army as the Artillery Section, Headquarters, 1st Armored Division, and activated at Fort Knox, Kentucky
- Redesignated 15 November 1940 as the Artillery Section, Division Headquarters, 1st Armored Division
- Reorganized and redesignated 1 March 1942 as Headquarters, Division Artillery Command, Headquarters, 1st Armored Division
- Consolidated 20 July 1944 with the Service Company, 1st Armored Division (less Military Police Platoon) (constituted 1 January 1942 in the Regular Army and activated 8 January 1942 at Fort Knox, Kentucky), and consolidated unit reorganized and redesignated as Headquarters and Headquarters Battery, Division Artillery, 1st Armored Division
- Inactivated 18 April 1946 at New York Port of Embarkation, New York
- Activated 7 March 1951 at Fort Hood, Texas
- Reorganized and redesignated 1 July 1955 as Headquarters and Headquarters Battery, 1st Armored Division Artillery
- Inactivated 23 December 1957 at Fort Polk, Louisiana
- Activated 3 February 1962 at Fort Hood, Texas
- Inactivated 1 May 2007 in USAG Baumholder, Germany
- Activated 23 July 2014 at Fort Bliss, Texas

=== Campaign participation credit ===
World War II: Tunisia; Naples-Foggia; Rome-Arno; Anzio; North Apennines; Po Valley

Southwest Asia: Defense of Saudi Arabia; Liberation and Defense of Kuwait

=== Decorations ===
- Meritorious Unit Commendation (Army) for SOUTHWEST ASIA
- Army Superior Unit Award, Streamer embroidered 1995–1996

== Heraldry ==
None authorized.
