= Tiu =

Tiu or TIU may refer to:

== Tiu ==
=== People ===
- Tiu (pharaoh) (4th millennium BC), predynastic Pharaoh of Lower Egypt
- Chris Tiu (born 1985), Filipino professional basketballer

=== Places ===
- Týr, as the Old English name for the Sky-God of Norse (Germanic) Mythology
- Ţiu, a village in Cernăteşti Commune, Dolj County, Romania

=== Surnames ===
- A variant of the Chinese family name Teoh
- The Filipino version of the Chinese surname Zhang

== TIU ==
- Richard Pearse Airport (IATA code: TIU), Timaru, New Zealand
- Tennis Integrity Unit, match fixing investigative organisation (2008–2020)
- Techno India University, Kolkata, West Bengal
- The Inspired Unemployed, Australian satirical comedy duo formed in 2019
- Tishk International University, Erbil-Kurdistan, Iraq
- Tokyo International University, Toshima, Japan
- Trinity International University, Bannockburn, Illinois
- Tsukuba International University, Tsuchiura, Japan
