= Leila Abdul-Latif =

Iraqi politician

Leila Abdul Latif
- ليلى عبد اللطيف

Minister of Labour and Social Affairs
- In office June 2004 – 3 May 2005
- President: Ghazi Mashal Ajil al-Yawer (acting)
- Prime Minister: Ayad Allawi
- Preceded by: Sami Azara al-Majun
- Succeeded by: Idris Hadi

Personal details
- Party: Iraqi National Accord

Leila Abdul Latif (Note: Arabic: ليلى عبد اللطيف) is an Iraqi politician who served as Minister of Labour and Social Affairs in the Iraqi Interim Government from June 2004 to 3 May 2005. A Shiite Arab from the Banu Tamim tribe, she is a member of the Iraqi National Accord led by Interim Prime Minister, Ayad Allawi.

She joined the Assembly of Independent Democrats led by Adnan Pachachi for the Iraqi legislative election of January 2005. Partly due to a boycott of the election by most Sunni Arabs, the list won no seats.

In May 2005, the new government of Ibrahim al-Jaafari issued arrest warrants against Abdul Latif for financial corruption and "bringing back to the government members of the former regime".

In August 2006, the independent Commission for Public Integrity filed corruption charges against Abdul Latif, before releasing her on bail. She was convicted of a minor offense and given a suspended sentence.

== Notes ==
Political offices
Preceded by Sami Azara al-Majun	Minister of Labour and Social Affairs; June 2004 - May 2005	Succeeded by Idris Hadi
