= Safia Taleb Ali al-Suhail =

Iraqi politician (born 1965)

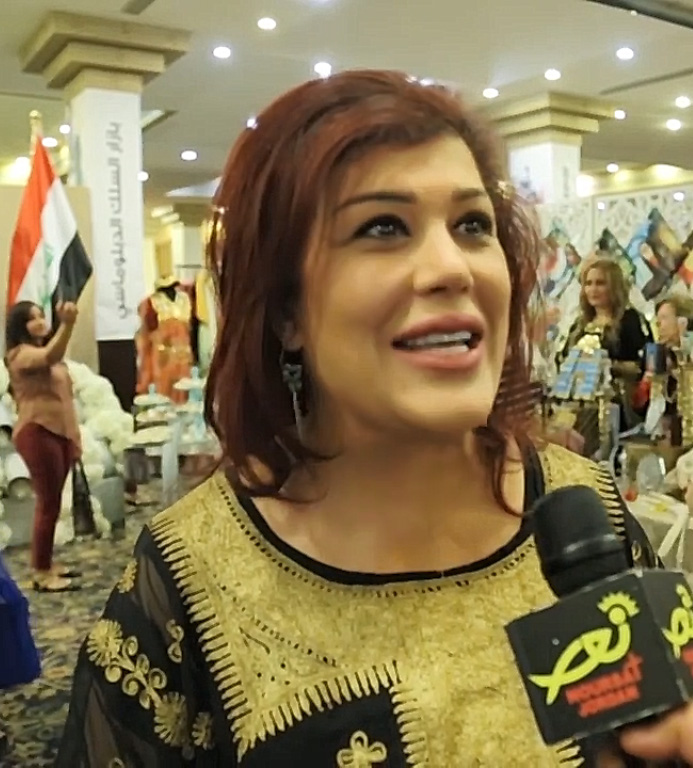
Image of Safia Taleb Ali al-Suhail

Safia Taleb Ali al-Suhail is an Iraqi politician who currently serves as an Ambassador of Iraq to Saudi Arabia, having previously served as the ambassador to Italy and Jordan. She was appointed the first female ambassador of Iraq in Oman in 2004, and she held important political and diplomatic positions in the country, including: a member of the Iraqi parliament for two parliamentary sessions on the capital Baghdad in the period 2005-2014, and the head of the Europe Department in the Iraqi Ministry of Foreign Affairs from 2014-2016, and the ambassador of the Republic of Iraq. To the Hashemite Kingdom of Jordan in the period 2016-2019 ”, She was a former member of the Council of Representatives of Iraq who was elected in December 2005 for the secular Iraqi National List.

== Background ==
Safia was born in 1965 to a Lebanese mother. Her father, Sheikh Taleb al-Souhail al-Tamimi, was himself also the leader of the Banu Tamim tribe and was a Muslim. He fled Iraq with his family to Lebanon after the Ba'ath Party coup of Ahmed Hassan al-Bakr in 1968. Safia later lived in Amman, Washington and Paris.

Sheikh al-Tamimi was assassinated in Beirut in 1994, reportedly after planning a coup against Saddam Hussein which was foiled when the United States allegedly tipped off Hussein. Safia took over her father's opposition role, arming opposition Iraqi groups, editing the opposition newspaper Al Manar Al Arabi and becoming the advocacy director for the International Alliance for Justice, a Paris-based human rights organisation.

In December 2002 she met Prime Minister Tony Blair to report the human rights abuses in Iraq under Saddam Hussein. The following month she wrote an article criticising the United Nations for investigating weapons of mass destruction but not investigating "crimes against the Iraqi people". She called for the establishment of a UN Commission to investigate human rights abuses and for Saddam Hussein to be indicted for genocide and crimes against humanity.

She was also appointed in December 2003 as a member of the anti-Saddam Hussein opposition in exile "Follow-Up and Arrangement Committee" as a member of the "National Campaign to Free Iraq from Dictatorship".

== Return to Iraq ==
Al-Suhail returned to Iraq following the Invasion of Iraq in March 2003 by the United States and allied forces.

In June 2004, her Kurdish husband, Bakhtiar Amin which happens to also have a dual nationality being French, was appointed Minister of Human Rights in the Iraqi Interim Government of Ayad Allawi. The following month, Al-Suhail was appointed as Iraqi Ambassador to Egypt., this was denied later on by Al-Suhail for accusations to the Foreign Minister of Iraq at the time Hoshyar Zebari that the Ministry of Foreign Affairs employs large numbers of Baathists.

In February 2005 she appeared next to Laura Bush for President George W. Bush's 2005 State of the Union Address as leader of the "Iraqi Women's Political Council". She then put herself forward as a candidate for the President of Iraq.

During negotiations over the Constitution of Iraq she called for Islam to be made "a main source" for legislation and not "the main source". She complained that the gains in women's rights since 1959 had been lost. This was considered one of the first statements made by an Iraqi official revealing the deteriorating women's rights status in post invasion Iraq in comparison to the Baathist Regime.

In November 2005 she was reported to have started a list - the "Iraqi Pledge Coalition" - with other Iraqi Women to campaign in the forthcoming elections to amend Article 39 of the Constitution of Iraq which deals with personal status law. However, following the elections she was nominated a member of the Council of Representatives of Iraq for the secular Iraqi National List of Interim Prime Minister Ayad Allawi.

In September 2007 she was reported to have left the Iraqi National List for the same reason she refused her ambassadorship to Egypt, grouping in the Council of Representatives, complaining that Allawi was highhanded and had many former Baathists amongst his ranks.

She is particularly visible in Council of Representatives (parliament) proceedings as she is the only member who doesn't speak with an Iraqi accent. Instead she speaks with a Lebanese accent.

== Literature ==
- Johanna Awad-Geissler: Safia. Eine Scheichtochter kämpft für ihr Land. Droemer, München 2006. Safia, la hija de un jeque lucha por el futuro de Irak. Maeva, Madrid 2004. De muze van Bagdad. Arena, Amsterdam, 2005.
