= Bakhtiar Amin =

Kurdish Iraqi politician

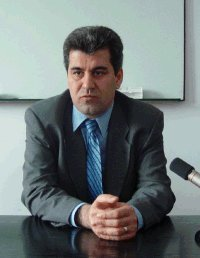

2nd Minister for Human Rights
- In office May 2004 – May 2005
- President: Ghazi Mashal Ajil al-Yawer
- Prime Minister: Ayad Allawi
- Preceded by: Abdel Basset Turki
- Succeeded by: Narmin Othman

Personal details
- Born: Kirkuk, Iraq
- Spouse: Safia Taleb Ali al-Suhail
- Education: University of Paris
- Occupation: Politician, Human Rights Activist

Bakhtiar Amin (born 1959) is a Kurdish Iraqi politician who was the Human Rights Minister in the Iraqi Interim Government from June 2004 to May 2005.

== Background ==
Amin was born in Kirkuk. He went to university in Sweden and the Sorbonne in France, where he received a master's degree in international affairs and a doctorate in political geography.

== Exile ==
In France, Amin was the secretary general of the Kurdish Institute and active in the International Alliance for Justice group that campaigned against Saddam Hussein's human rights violations. In 2001 he was invited to give evidence to the European Parliament's Committee on Foreign Affairs and Human Rights as an expert on the political and human rights situation there.

He condemned Saddam Hussein for creating a "museum of crimes, land of sorrow and hopelessness" and said that there will be "generations" of "genetic mutations suffered by the survivors of his chemical, biological and radiological attacks" in Halabja. He called for the creation of an International Court for Iraq, along the lines of the International Criminal Tribunal for the former Yugoslavia.

Amin then went on to be the director of the Human Rights Coalition in the United States He went on to found the Iraqi Democracy Institute in the US.

== Interim government ==
Amin returned to Iraq following the 2003 invasion of Iraq and overthrow of Saddam Hussein. In September 2003 he was quoted supporting the decision to sanction Al Jazeera and Al Arabiya, saying they were "spreading sectarian and racial hatred" and saying a "western democracy would not allow masked gunmen to appear on TV and make direct threats against government officials" In November he was quoted calling for a referendum to decide whether the death penalty should be restored.

Amin was appointed as the Human Rights Minister in the Iraqi Governing Council in May 2004, following the resignation of his predecessor, Abdel Basset Turki. He was reappointed to the Iraqi Interim Government when that was formed in June 2004.

In September 2004 he was quoted saying that conditions at the Abu Ghraib prison had "immensely improved" since the Abu Ghraib torture and prisoner abuse scandal.

In May 2005, following the Iraqi legislative election of January 2005 and the formation of the Iraqi Transitional Government he was replaced by Narmin Othman.

Amin's wife, Safia Taleb Ali al-Suhail, is a prominent female Iraq politician who was appointed as Ambassador to Egypt in 2004 and elected to the Council of Representatives of Iraq in December 2005.

== After government ==
In February 2006, Amin was asked, with two other Muslim former politicians, to select the board of directors for the Broader Middle East and North Africa Initiative's "Foundation for the Future".

Political offices
Preceded by Abdel Basset Turki	Human Rights Minister of Iraq; May 2004 - May 2005	Succeeded by Narmin Othman
