= Operation Phantom Linebacker =

Part of the Iraq War

- Part of war on terrorism, Operation Iraqi Freedom
Date	Early August 2004
Location	Baghdad, Iraq
Result	Designed to interdict anti-government fighters from entering Iraq from Syria

Belligerents
United States; Iraqi National Guard (South Korea) ROK forces in Iraq	Syria, (Iraq) Iraqi Insurgency

Commanders and leaders
(South Korea) Capt. Kim Chu Young	(Syria) Unknown (Iraq) Unknown

Operation Phantom Linebacker was a military operation in Iraq carried out jointly by Coalition forces and the Iraqi military to reinforce the Iraq–Syria border. The operation was put in place at the request of the Iraqi government, which claimed that large numbers of foreign militants and weapons were entering the country through the border, although this was disputed by the U.S. military, which maintained that Iraq's insurgency was largely homegrown. Under the operation, several thousand U.S. troops were sent to the border to assist in border patrols and train members of the Iraqi border police.

Until 2003, the border had been patrolled by paramilitary units and local towns. The U.S.-led invasion of Iraq caused this system to collapse. As a result, supporters of the deposed government of Saddam Hussein were feared to be streaming across the border. Some of the militants used poorly patrolled border crossings in the desert, while others crossed at staffed checkpoints using fake passports. U.S. military officials noted Iraqi soldiers' susceptibility to bribes was a major issue in the porous nature of the border.

Although Iraqi officials had expressed fears that large numbers of foreign fighters were entering Iraq from Syria, around two months into the operation the U.S. military stated that the operation had apprehended only small numbers of such militants. Most of the people crossing the border were smugglers and Syrians who had ties to tribes living on the Iraqi side of the border, although a significant number of Iraqi militants linked to the former ruling Ba'ath Party, who had fled Iraq after the U.S.-led invasion, were also apprehended.

== Military Units Involved ==
US forces reported to be involved were

- 3rd Brigade, United States Army
- 2nd Infantry Division (United States)

Iraqi Units involved

- Iraqi National Guard
- Iraqi Border Police

== Casualties ==
No US, Coalition or Iraqi casualties or deaths were reported during the operation.
