= Ministry of Human Rights (Iraq) =

Government ministry of Iraq

Coordinates: 33°19′12″N 44°21′54″E

Republic of Iraq Ministry of Human Rights
- وزارة حقوق الانسان

Agency overview
- Headquarters: Al Mansour, Baghdad (Iraq)
- Agency executive: Mohammed Mahdi Albaiati, Minister; Deputy Minister; Abdul Kareim Al-Janabi, Deputy Minister
- Website: http://www.humanrights.gov.iq

The Ministry of Human Rights was a cabinet-level ministry within the government of Iraq between 2003 and 2015. The Ministry was created by the Coalition Provisional Authority when the Iraqi Governing Council was formed after the invasion of Iraq.

The Ministry is concerned with human rights advocacy, Saddam regime victims, victims of terrorism rights, martyrs rights, prisoners rights and mass graves in Iraq.

== List of ministers ==
- Dr. Abdulbaseet Al-Hadithi (September 2003 – April 2004)
- Bakhtiar Amin (June 2004 – May 2005)
- Narmin Othman (May 2005 – 20 May 2006)
- Wijedan Salem (20 May 2006 – 21 December 2010)
- Mohammed Shia' Al Sudani (21 December 2010 – 18 October 2014)
- Mohammed Mahdi Ameen al-Bayati (18 October 2014 – 16 August 2015)

The ministry was removed from the Cabinet in August 2015 by Prime Minister Haider al-Abadi when he decreased the number of cabinet ministers in response to public demonstrations against corruption and government inefficiency.

== Ministry offices ==
- The Minister Office
- The Deputy Minister of Administration Affairs Office
- The Deputy Minister of Research Affairs Office
- The General Inspector Office
- The National Center of Human Rights
- Humanity Affairs Department
- performance monitoring and protection of rights Department
- Media Center
- Relations and International Cooperation Department
- Administration and Financial affairs Department
- Legal Department
- Governorates Affairs Department
