= Linebacker (disambiguation) =

A linebacker is a position in American and Canadian football.

Linebacker may also refer to:

- Operation Linebacker, a U.S. military campaign conducted against North Vietnam
- Operation Linebacker II, a U.S. military campaign conducted against North Vietnam
- Operation Phantom Linebacker, a coalition military operation in Iraq
- M6 Linebacker, a fighting vehicle
