= Operation Iron Hammer (Iraq 2003) =

Military operation during the Iraq War

- Part of The war on terrorism, Operation Iraqi Freedom
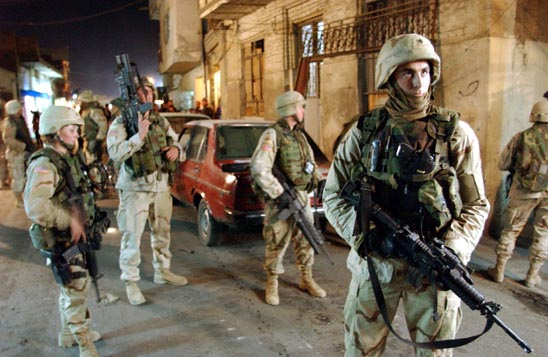
- Members 1st Armored Division wait to begin a cordon and search of a Baghdad neighborhood as part of Operation Iron Hammer.
Date	12 November 2003 – 25 December 2003
Location	Baghdad, Iraq
Result	Capture of anti-coalition forces weapons, failure to suppress expanding insurgency

Belligerents
United States	(Iraq) Iraqi Insurgency

Casualties and losses
None reported	2 killed 3 wounded
- None reported

Operation Iron Hammer was a joint operation between the US Army, US Air Force and Iraqi Civil Defense Corps with the objective of preventing the staging of weapons by anti-coalition forces, and preemptively destroy enemy operating bases and fighters in Baghdad.

== Launch ==
The operation was launched on the night of 12 November 2003 by elements of the US Army's 1st Armored Division who performed cordon-and-search actions in several Baghdad neighborhoods. The operation's first salvo came when 1st Armored Division soldiers saw mortar rounds being fired from a van and gave chase, noting stops it made. An AH-64 Apache helicopter followed the van and attacked it, killing two suspected anti-coalition fighters and wounding three others. Five others were captured. Soldiers found an 82 mm mortar launch tube at one of the van's stops.

== Strikes ==
In Operation Iron Hammer the military began preemptively destroying buildings suspected to be bases of operations for anti-coalition forces. The buildings included the former Republican Guard building, in the western part of the capital near Baghdad International Airport, and a warehouse in southern Baghdad. Both buildings had been used to conduct attacks on U.S. troops and were destroyed by AC-130 Spectre gunships and M2 Bradley fighting vehicles. U.S. forces also fired artillery rounds at two suspected mortar and rocket launch sites, one in western Baghdad and one in eastern Baghdad.

== Conclusion ==
At the conclusion of Operation Iron Hammer Coalition forces has conducted 609 patrols in and around Baghdad capturing 33 enemy personnel. Combat actions included two cordon-and-search operations in Baghdad, detaining six people with suspected ties to the Fedayeen Saddam paramilitary organization and other anti-coalition elements. Another cordon-and-search operation in Baghdad's Azamiyah section netted 25 enemy personnel, including a former Republican Guard general, and significant quantities of weapons and ammunition. A joint cordon-and-search operation was also conducted in the Abu Ghuraib area with the Iraqi Civil Defense Corps.

== Military units involved ==
US forces reported to be involved were

- 1st Armored Division
- USS Enterprise (CVN 65)

Iraqi forces reported to be involved were

- Iraqi Civil Defense Corps

== Casualties ==
No casualty figures are available. See "Casualties of the Iraq War" for information on casualty figures for the war in general.

== Next operations ==
Followed Operation OK Corral, followed by Operation Eagle Curtain.
