= National Guard (Iraq) =

National Guard الحرس الوطني
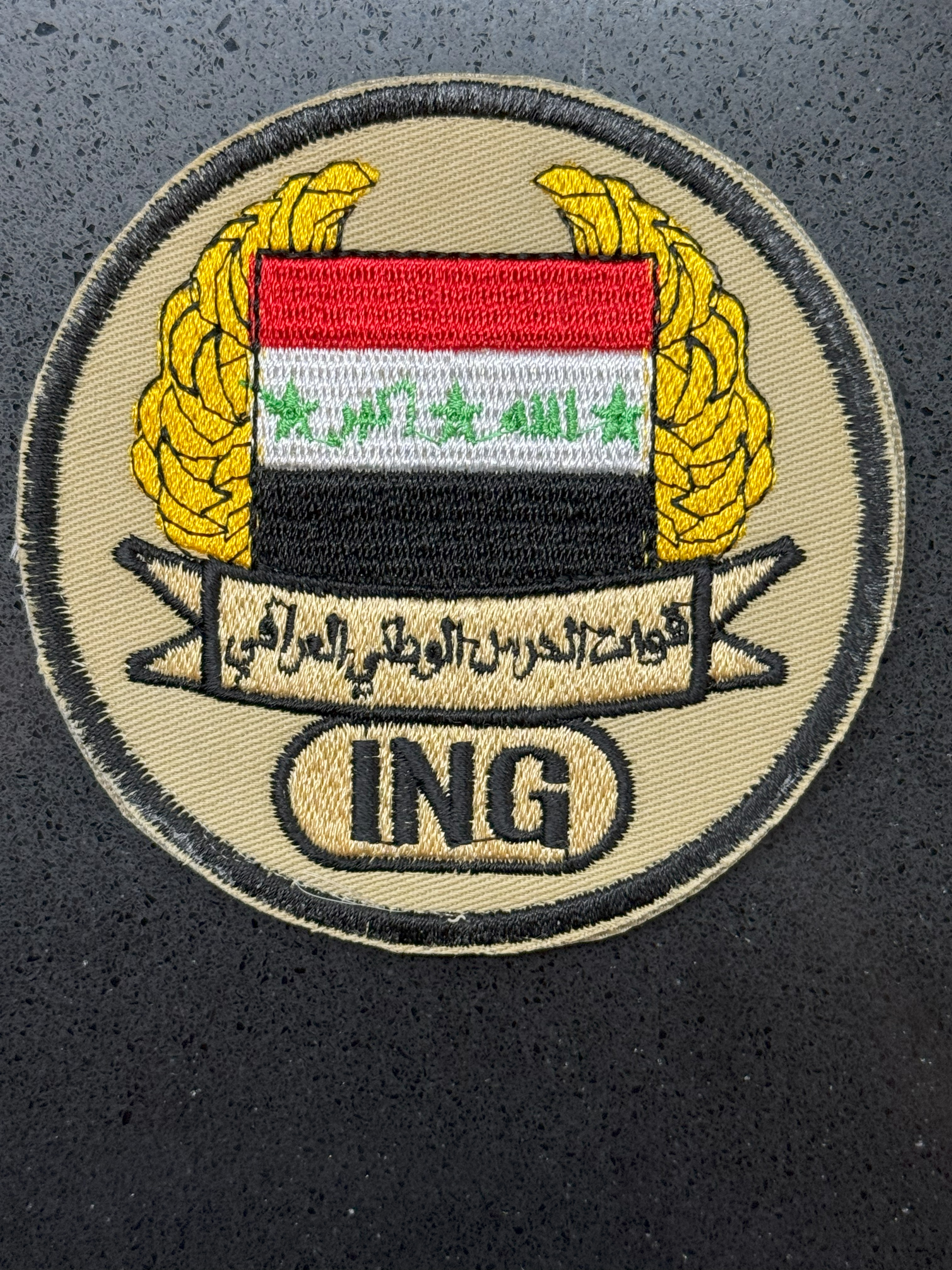
- Official (defunct) ING patch.
- Active: September 2003 – June 2004 (as ICDC); June - December 2004
- Country: Iraq
- Allegiance: Coalition Provisional Authority/Iraqi Governing Council (until June 2004); Iraqi Interim Government (from June 2004)
- Type: Infantry
- Role: Counter-Insurgency
- Size: 40,000 (December 2004)
- Patron: United States
- Engagements: Post-invasion Insurgency

The Iraqi National Guard (ING; Arabic: الحرس الوطني, al-Ḥaras al-Waṭanī) was an armed force originally established by the United States Coalition Provisional Authority. Following the 2003 invasion of Iraq, CPA Administrator Paul Bremer disbanded the apparatus of the Iraqi Armed Forces through Coalition Provisional Authority Order 2. U.S. divisions of Combined Joint Task Force 7 then began recruiting and training auxiliary forces, the Iraqi Civil Defense Corps, in order to combat the insurgency.

The ING replaced the former Iraqi Civil Defense Corps.

== History ==
"On 20 June 2004, with the concurrence of the Iraqi Interim Government, the ICDC was redesignated as the Iraqi National Guard (ING)."

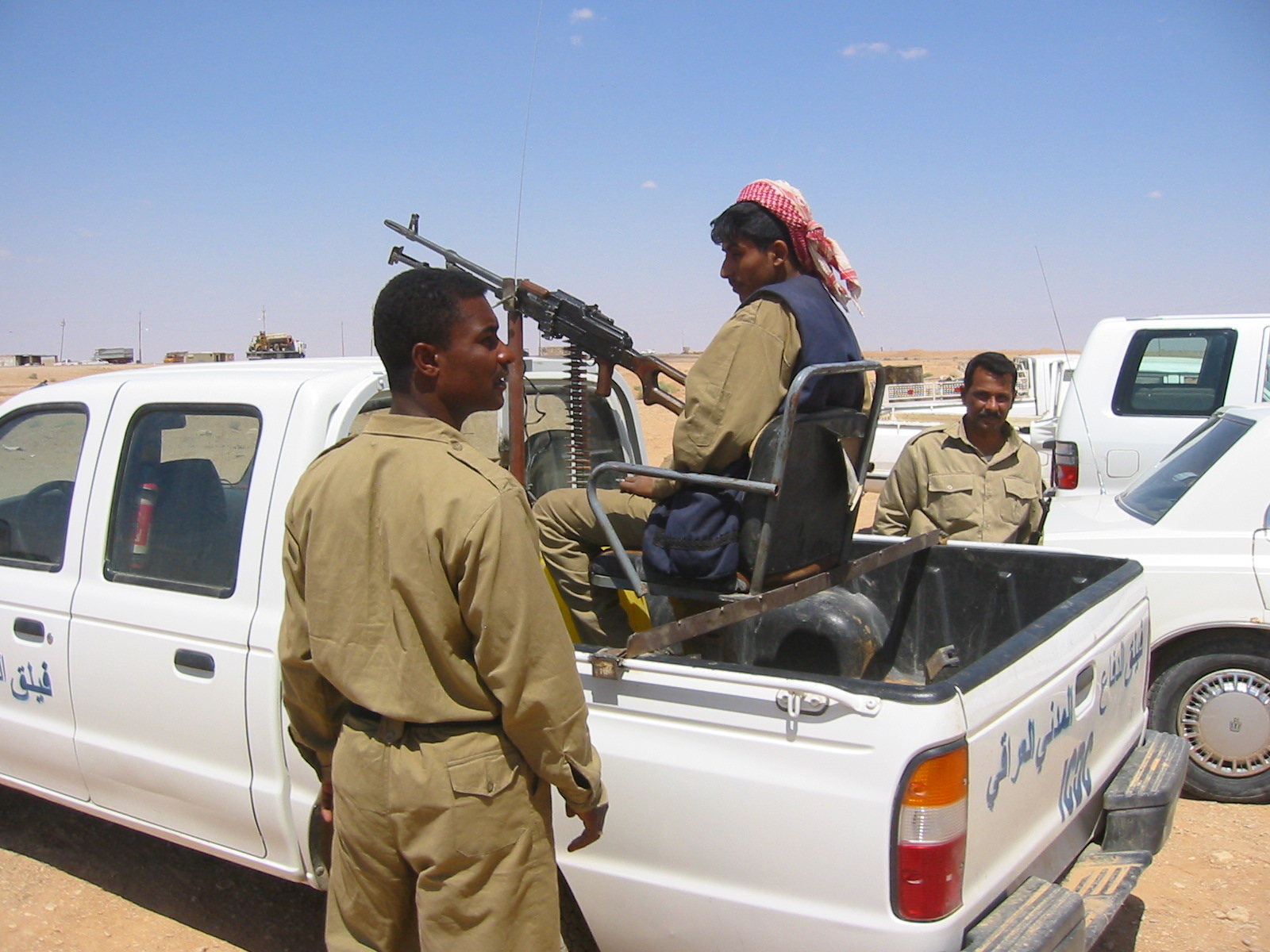
Iraqi National Guard troops with a PK machine gun mounted on a Ford Ranger based technical.

As the ICDC became the ING, the United States Army was "..ordered to expand their efforts to train and equip the new ING forces. The 1st Infantry Division and the 1st Cavalry Division in particular devoted a significant amount of resources to establishing these units. In Tikrit, units of the 1st ID designed a 3-week course that included training on rifle marksmanship, conduct of traffic checkpoints, map reading, basic drill, and first aid. The ING soldiers continued to improve their skills as they conducted joint missions with Coalition forces. Iraqi Colonel Shaker Faris Al Azawi, commander of the 203d ING Battalion, commented, “Our relationship with the Coalition forces is very good. They give us ammunition, supplies, vehicles, and experience, and the training they’ve given us is very important. Because of it, we’re operating at a very high level.” In addition to providing training to the ING, the 1st ID, with support from Multi-National Security Transition Command – Iraq’s nascent logistics structure," provided "equipment to the new ING units."

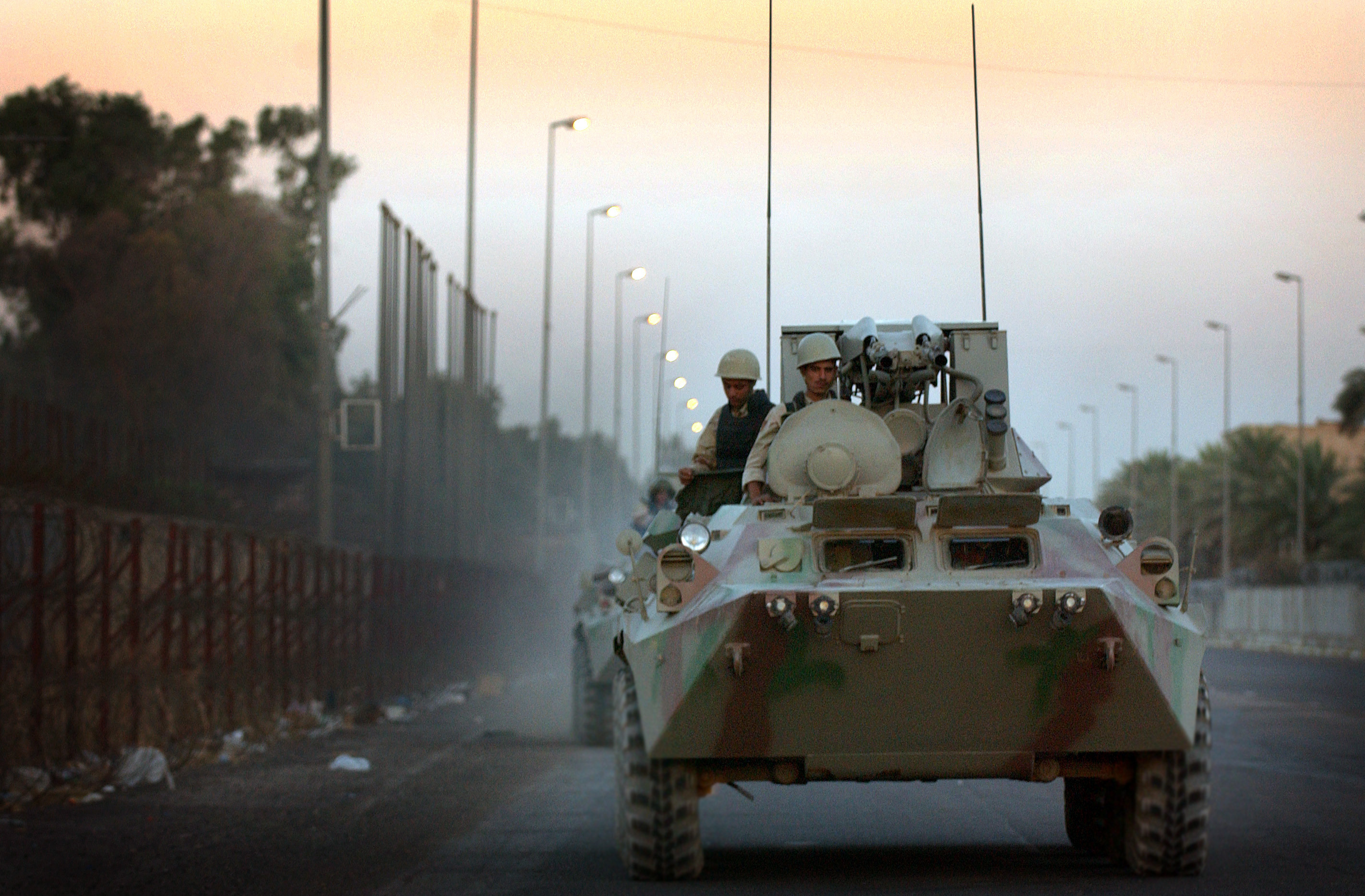
In the early morning hours Iraqi National Guard (ING) troops move BTR-94 Armored Personnel Carriers into position in Baghdad, Iraq.

Despite attacks by the Iraqi insurgency, the Iraqi National Guard was able to recruit many Iraqis from the vast ranks of the unemployed.

However, there have been several instances where the ING have refused to take military action against fellow Iraqis, deserted, or allegedly aided the resistance. ING units in Fallujah came under attack after the First Battle of Fallujah. In August 2004, insurgents in Fallujah kidnapped the Commanders of the 505th and 506th ING Battalions. One was beheaded. One of the battalion's headquarters was overrun, and insurgents "stole a fleet of ING trucks and cars, 10 rocket-propelled grenades, 300 AK-47s, machine guns, ammunition, computers, radios and furniture." Mass desertions from the two battalions followed. I Marine Expeditionary Force ordered the new battalion commanders to reform their units; an assessment at the time noted that if the reformation was successful, it would be "the third time these two units have been reformed and refitted with equipment and weapons after such desertions (UPI, Marines Disband, 15 Aug 04). The new battalion commanders are now discussing with U.S. forces the possibility moving their soldiers and their families to more secure, isolated bases outside the city."

"..ICDC troops and police were sometimes so enmeshed in local dynamics that they used their status and power to engage in corrupt practices.." (Salmoni, 54)

"National Guard battalions based on the Kurdish militia (peshmerga) or Shi'a militias, performed adequately. Battalions based on Sunnis did not. Disaffected from the Iraqi government and angry at the Coalition, at this stage in the war, Sunnis generally sympathized with the insurgency and had no intention of fighting their fellow tribesmen or family members. There is little doubt that the U.S. military could have done a better job advising and training the Iraqis. Few commanders embedded advisers with local forces."

In September 2004, a senior member, General Talib al-Lahibi was arrested on suspicion of having links with insurgent groups. In October 2004, the commander of the 507th ING Battalion, Colonel Mohamed Essa Baher, in Mahmoudiyah, south of Baghdad, barely escaped assassination. Lieutenant Colonel Haydar Rasool, an Iraqi national guard battalion commander based in Baghdad, said he lost more than 30 of his 1,000 men over the past year.

In December 2004, it was announced that the Iraqi National Guard would be dissolved and merged into the New Iraqi Army. At this time its strength was officially over 40,000 men. The merger was planned to take place on Iraqi Army Day, January 6, 2005.

=== New National Guard ===
In 2016 the Iraqi parliament approved a draft law to recreate a National Guard. The draft law has raised disputes between political parties, and parliament has not yet set a date to take further action. Supporters believe the proposal eventually will be approved.

As of 2024, this proposal was never carried out.
