= Tahir Albakaa =

Iraqi historian

Tahir Albakaa (born 1950 in Takir, Iraq) is an Iraqi historian who received his Master's degree and Ph.D in Modern History from Baghdad University.

Albakaa worked at Al-Mustansiriya University from 1983 to 2003 and is the former President of the University. In June 2004 he was chosen as a Minister of Higher Education and Scientific Research for the Iraqi Interim Government. Albakaa was a member of the Iraqi National Assembly in 2005, and a member of the Iraqi Constitution Writing Committee.

In October 2005 he went to Harvard University as a visiting scholar, and then moved to Suffolk University in 2006.

He has published six books and sixty-five papers.
