= Abdel Basset Turki =

Iraqi politician (born 1953)

Abdel Basset Turki al-Hadithi

Governor of the Central Bank of Iraq
- In office October 2012 – 19 October 2014
- Prime Minister: Nouri al-Maliki
- Preceded by: Sinan Al Shabibi
- Succeeded by: Ali Mohsen al-Alaq

1st Minister for Human Rights
- In office September 2003 – April 2004
- President: Iraqi Governing Council
- Prime Minister: Iraqi Governing Council
- Preceded by: Position created
- Succeeded by: Bakhtiar Amin

Personal details
- Born: 1953 (age 72–73) Anbar, Iraq

Abdel Basset Turki al-Hadithi is an Iraqi politician. He was Minister of Human Rights in the cabinet appointed by the Iraq Interim Governing Council in September 2003. He resigned in April 2004 in protest at the deaths of over 600 Iraqis during the siege of Falluja.

In November 2003 Turki demanded access to the captured "Most-wanted Iraqi playing cards", saying they were not all prisoners of war. He condemned human rights violations by US and allied troops in the Combined Joint Task Force 7. He called for victims to be paid compensation.

After the emergence of the Abu Ghraib torture and prisoner abuse scandal in May 2004, Turki stated that he had complained to Paul Bremer, the US head of the Coalition Provisional Authority in November 2003 of human rights violations in Iraqi jails but had "received no answer".

Abdel Basit Turki al-Sae'ed was Iraq's acting central bank governor from October 2012 until October 2014, during that period he was simultaneously the head of the country's Supreme Audit Board. This questionable appointment was followed after he led an audit in September 2012 of the central bank currency auctions convincing him that $800 million is "transferred illegally under false pretenses" outside of the country every week. This was related in the October 31st 2012 report from the US government's Special Inspector General for Iraq Reconstruction (SIGIR). "Turki was not available for comment on his report".

In December 2014 the Supreme Court of Iraq concluded that the findings from Turki's audit report were unfounded. Again "Turki was not available for comment".

Preceded by Coalition Provisional Authority	Minister of Human Rights; September 2003 – April 2004	Succeeded by Bakhtiar Amin
