= Sami Azara al-Majun =

Iraqi politician (1932–2023)

- سامي عزارة آل معجون

Minister of Labor and Social Affairs (Iraq)
- In office September 2003
- Preceded by: Coalition Provisional Authority
- Succeeded by: Leila Abdul-Latif

Personal details
- Born: 1932
- Died: 17 September 2023 (aged 90–91)
- Children: Kholoud Azara Al-Majoun
- Religious demographic: Shia Muslim

Sami Azara Al-Maajoun (Arabic: سامي عزارة آل معجون; 1932 – 17 September 2023) was an Iraqi politician who was Minister of Labor and Social Affairs in the cabinet appointed by the Interim Iraq Governing Council in September 2003. A Shia Muslim and tribal leader from Samawah in Southern Iraq, al-Maajoun worked for the Saudi justice ministry from 1971 to 1980. He was a member of the Iraqi National Congress. Al-Maajoun died in London, England on 17 September 2023, at the age of 91.

== Positions ==
He held the position of legal advisor at the Ministry of Defense during the monarchy, then became the director of the legal department tasked with monitoring the political activities of the Ba'ath Party. He managed the legal department responsible for following the activities of the Ba'ath Party and the National Guard militia during the era of Abdul Karim Qasim in 1958. He contributed to the investigation of Ahmed Hassan al-Bakr and ordered his transfer to Nugra Salman Prison.

He was arrested after the 17 July Revolution of 1968 and was later released. He emigrated to Saudi Arabia and worked for the Ministry of Justice (Saudi Arabia) from 1971 to 1980.

He founded the National Reform Movement in London in 1991 and later became a member of the Unified Iraqi National Congress in 1995. He subsequently left the party. He participated in numerous Iraqi opposition conferences until 2002 and became the civil governor of the city of Samawah in 2003.

He served as the Minister of Labour and Social Affairs in the Iraqi Governing Council government from September 2003 to June 2004. He was succeeded by Layla Abdul Latif.

He became a member of the National Assembly within the United Iraqi Alliance in 2005, and served as the Chairman of the Tribal Affairs Committee in the Supreme Commission for National Reconciliation and Dialogue in 2006.

Preceded by Coalition Provisional Authority	Minister of Labor and Social Affairs; September 2003 – June 2004	Succeeded by Leila Abdul-Latif
