= Iraqi Civil Defense Corps =

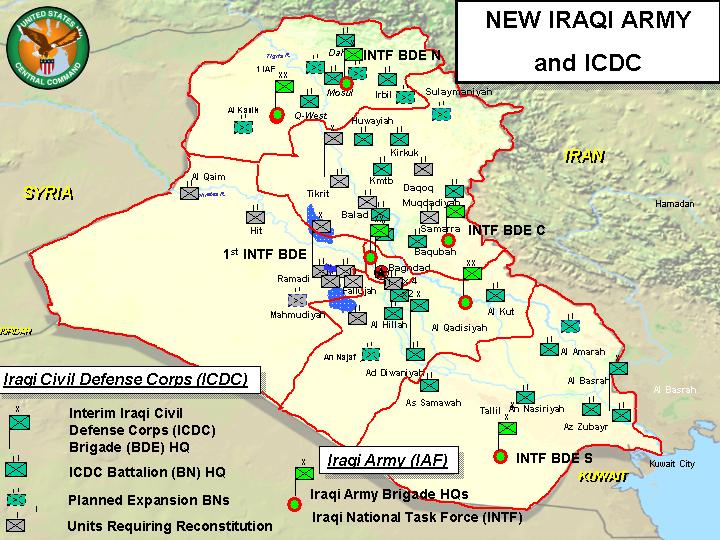
- Map of New Iraqi Army and Iraqi Civil Defense Corps units as of 30 April 2004
- Active: September 2003 – June 2004
- Country: Iraq
- Allegiance: Coalition Provisional Authority/Iraqi Governing Council (until June 2004); Iraqi Interim Government (from June 2004)
- Type: Infantry
- Role: Counter-Insurgency
- Patron: United States
- Engagements: Post-invasion Insurgency

The Iraqi Civil Defense Corps was an Iraqi armed formation created by the Coalition Provisional Authority (CPA) which existed in 2003–2004. The ICDC was controlled by Combined Joint Task Force 7. The idea originated from the 101st Airborne Division as a means of using unemployed former Iraqi military personnel and tribal militias to supplement the scarce U.S. military footprint.

The ICDC was replaced by the National Guard (Iraq).

== History ==
The ICDC was established through CPA Order Number 28 of September 3, 2003 to complement operations conducted by Coalition military forces in Iraq.

The ICDC was tasked with the following missions: joint patrolling with Coalition Forces; fixed site security; route security; natural disaster aid, and general assistance.

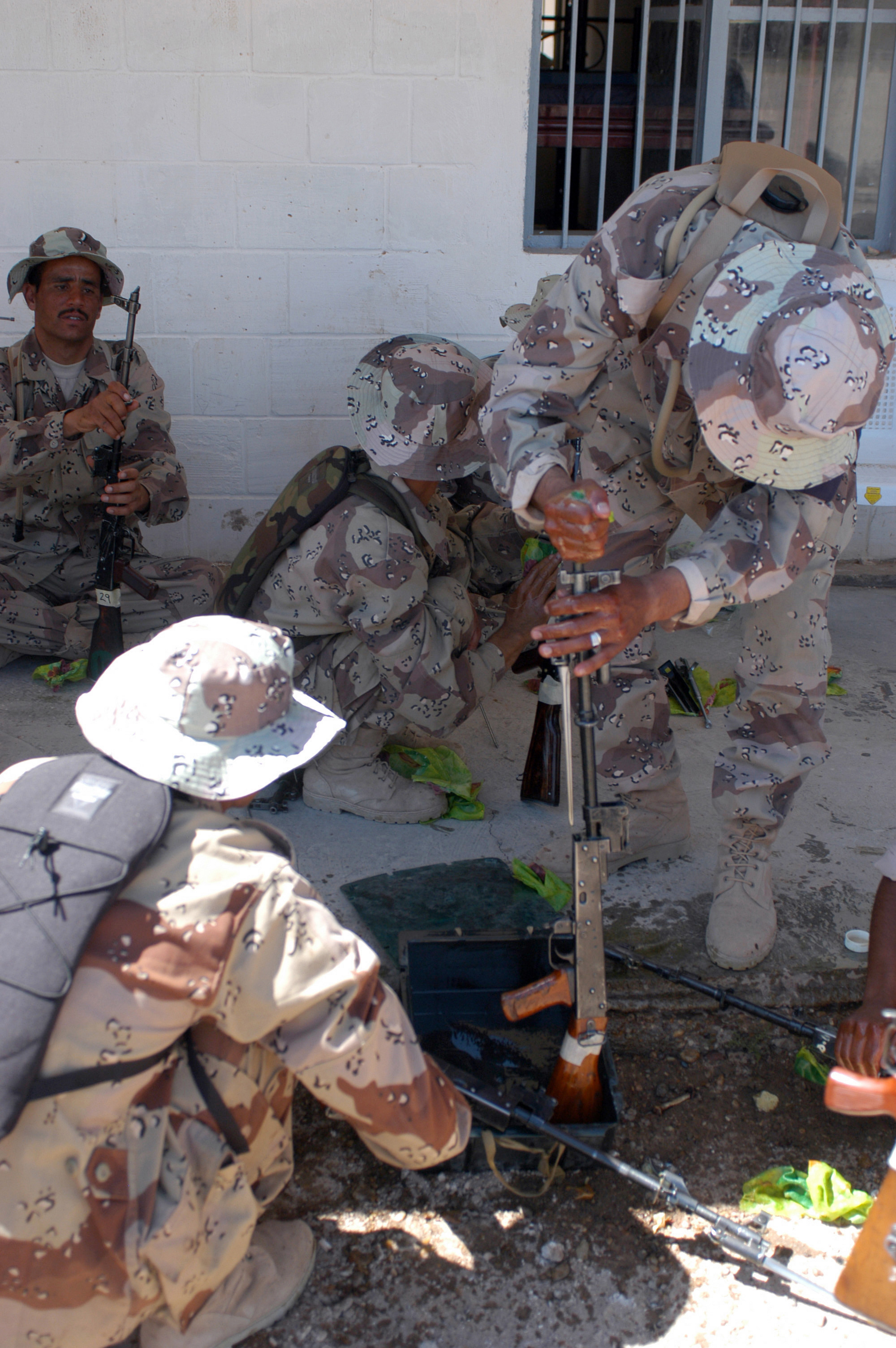
A group of recruits from the 60th Brigade, Iraqi Civil Defense Corps, clean their weapons during training at Camp Ali.

The ICDC was composed of 15,000 men divided into 18 battalions of 846 men. Members of the ICDC had solid brown uniforms and baseball-type caps in red, blue, and black with ICDC in block letters. They were armed with Kalashnikov assault rifles and were equipped with jeeps and trucks (2 jeeps and 12 trucks per battalion). They were hired under a one-year renewable contract and trained by individual area-holding divisions in different ways. As of mid-October 2003 more than 6,000 members of ICDC were employed. About 4,700 trained soldiers were employed by 25 October 2003, said the American Forces Press Service.

"Over the next year [from May 2003], a series of adjustments, culminating in a strategic review undertaken in mid-2004 by the Commanding General, Multi-National Security Transition Command – Iraq and U.S. Chief of Mission ..expanded the end-strength to 62 battalions." After a July and August formal required troops to task assessment, it was decided that the ICDC, to be renamed the Iraqi National Guard, would add 20 battalions, for a total of 65.

=== Transition to National Guard ===
Under CPA Order Number 73 of 22 April 2004, all personnel, facilities and equipment of the ICDC were transferred to the Iraqi Ministry of Defence as a component of the Iraqi Armed Forces. "On 20 June 2004, with the concurrence of the Iraqi Interim Government, the ICDC was redesignated as the Iraqi National Guard (ING)."

"As the ICDC transitioned to the ING, US military units were ordered to expand their efforts to train and equip the new ING forces. The 1st Infantry Division and the 1st Cavalry Division in particular devoted a significant amount of resources to establishing these units. In the city of Tikrit, units of the 1st ID designed a 3-week course that included training on rifle marksmanship, conduct of traffic checkpoints, map reading, basic drill, and first aid. The ING soldiers continued to improve their skills as they conducted joint missions with Coalition forces. Iraqi Colonel Shaker Faris Al Azawi, commander of the 203d ING Battalion, commented, “Our relationship with the Coalition forces is very good. They give us ammunition, supplies, vehicles, and experience, and the training they’ve given us is very important. Because of it, we’re operating at a very high level.” In addition to providing training to the ING, the 1st ID, with support from Multi-National Security Transition Command – Iraq’s nascent logistics structure," provided "equipment to the new ING units."

== Assessment ==
Kenneth Pollack summed up the ICDC in 2006 in these words:

..in Washington’s fever to churn out more Iraqi soldiers to hold up as proof that no more American or other foreign forces were needed, the Administration insisted on a breakneck pace that virtually eliminated any ability to vet personnel before they were brought into the ICDC. At the same time, training time was cut to just two or three weeks. Not surprisingly, the ICDC turned out to be a total debacle: It had virtually no combat capability, was thoroughly penetrated by the insurgents, militias, and organized crime, and collapsed whenever it was committed to battle.

The ICDC "performed disastrously during the April 2004 uprisings, when almost half its personnel deserted."
