= Ali Faik al-Ghabban =

Iraqi politician

Ali Faik al-Ghabban (Arabic: علي فائق الغبان, also written Ali Faiq al-Ghabban or Ali Faek al-Ghadban) was Minister of Youth and Sports in the cabinet appointed by the Interim Iraq Governing Council in September 2003 and in the Iraqi Interim Government. A Shia Muslim, al-Ghabban is a supporter of the Supreme Islamic Iraqi Council.

Preceded by Coalition Provisional Authority	Minister of Youth and Sports; September 2003 – May 2005	Succeeded by Talib Aziz Zayni
