= 4th Battalion, 27th Field Artillery Regiment =

4-27 Field Artillery
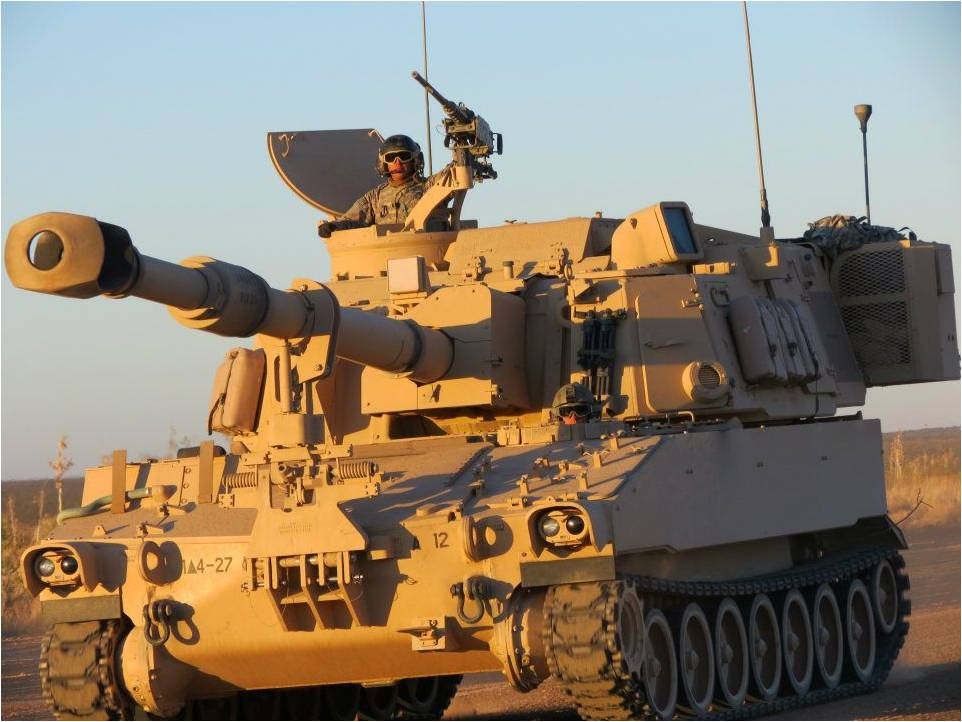
- Active: 1918–present
- Country: United States
- Branch: United States Army
- Role: Field Artillery, Motorized Infantry, and Morale Assault Operations
- Garrison/HQ: Fort Bliss
- Nickname: Iron Thunder
- Motto: United We Stand
- Engagements: WW II Persian Gulf War Operation Iraqi Freedom
- Decorations: Presidential Unit Citation (Army) for AL KUT and AN NAJAF Meritorious Unit Commendation (Army) for SOUTHWEST ASIA 1990-1991a Army Superior Unit Award French Croix de Guerre with Palm, World War II for CENTRAL ITALY Battery C additionally entitled to: Valorous Unit Award for IRAQ 1991

Insignia
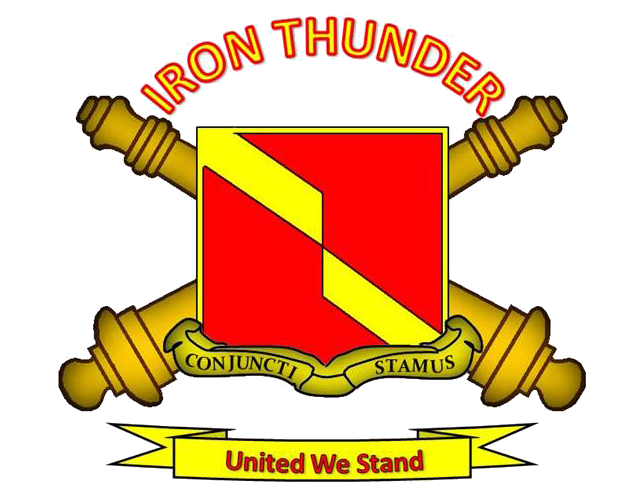
- Identification symbol: Unit crest of the 4th Battalion, 27th Field Artillery Regiment

The 4th Battalion of the 27th Field Artillery Regiment (4-27 FA) is a mechanized artillery battalion stationed at Fort Bliss, Texas. One of five combat battalions assigned to the 2nd Brigade Combat Team (1AD), 4-27 FA currently fields approximately 600 artillery and support personnel, operating self-propelled M109A6 howitzers, and providing direct fire support to the brigade.

Originally formed as a training unit in 1918 during the waning months of WW I, 4-27 FA served extensively in WW 2 and has taken part in several other conflicts and peacekeeping missions. The unit has achieved two notable battlefield distinctions to date. The first during Operation Desert Storm, when the battalion played a significant role in the 1st Armored Division's defeat of the Iraqi Republican Guard at the Battle of Medina Ridge. The second occurred 12 years later during Operation Iraqi Freedom, when 4-27 FA served in a US Army pilot project to convert artillery units into ad hoc motorized infantry battalions and deploy them in a variety of infantry and military police roles throughout central Baghdad, which earned the battalion the Presidential Unit Citation.

== History ==
=== Formation ===
The 4th Battalion, 27th Field Artillery (FA) was first formed on July 5, 1918, as a training unit and part of the 9th Infantry Division, at Camp McClellan, Alabama. No units in the division were deployed during World War I. During the interwar period, 4-27 FA was reassigned multiple times as an inactive/active training unit in both the Regular Army and Army Reserves.

=== World War II ===
While fluctuating in size from just a single 8-gun battery to an extended 32-gun battalion, 4-27 FA was assigned to the 1st Armored Division (1AD) throughout the war. Primarily equipped with 105 mm M7 SP guns, the unit fought in seven major campaigns during World War II:

- Algeria-French Morocco (as part of the initial Operation Torch invasion)
- Tunisia (including Battle of Kasserine Pass)
- Naples-Foggia
- Anzio
- Rome-Arno
- North Apennines
- Po Valley

After the war, the battalion was briefly converted into a military police unit (Troop A, 27th Constabulary Squadron) and remained on garrison duty in Germany for two years. In 1948, the unit was reassigned back to 1AD as an artillery unit, based out of Fort Hood, Texas.

=== Cold War ===
During the early years of the Cold War, 4-27 FA went through several reassignments, reorganizations and occasional deactivation periods, with some batteries reassigned to other elements of the 27th FA regiment and stationed in the US to serve as training commands. The rest of the batteries deployed to West Germany in support of NATO. At least one battery of the unit was continuously stationed in either Babenhausen or Baumholder, West Germany from 1959 to 1985. These batteries were assigned to 1 AD's division artillery (DIVARTY), part of NATO's Central Army Group, and tasked primarily with defending the Fulda Gap corridor from a Warsaw Pact assault.

As a dual-purpose training/maneuver unit, 4-27 FA was one of the first combat units to integrate African-American service members into the US Army's artillery branch, in both officer and enlisted ranks, following President Truman's Executive Order 9981.

In 1985, all of the battalion's howitzer batteries were consolidated into a new rocket artillery unit at Peden Barracks based in Wertheim, Germany, and rearmed with the M270 Multiple Launch Rocket System.

=== Persian Gulf War ===
On November 4, 1990, the 4th Battalion, 27th Field Artillery was deployed to defend Saudi Arabia from Iraqi invasion as part of Operation Desert Shield in late December 1990. When the defense of Saudi Arabia mission gave way to the liberation of Kuwait, 4-27 FA provided extensive fire support for the 1st Armored Division. During the ensuing 96 hours of Operation Desert Storm, the battalion unleashed major bombardments with their 27 M270 MLRS launchers against Iraqi forces.

Throughout four days of combat, including the initial breach of Iraqi lines and the battles of Al Busayyah and Medina Ridge, the unit conducted one of the US Army's largest artillery bombardments since the Second World War. All totaled, 4-27 FA fired 588 M26 "cluster bomb" rockets into Iraqi forces and inflicted several thousand casualties in advance of 1st AD's armored assault. To put the scale of this bombardment into perspective, each rocket contained 644 DPICM bomblet submunitions, for a total of 378,672 warheads. US service members nicknamed these barrages "steel rain." While in practice many targets received multiple salvos and the submunitions had a 2–5% dud rate, if each rocket 4-27 FA fired during the operation had been spaced out to optimize the submunition dispersal, the barrage would have theoretically blasted a target area of 49 square kilometers.

On February 16, 1997, 4-27 FA was reactivated at Baumholder, Germany, and converted to a direct support howitzer battalion, armed with 155 mm M109A6 Paladin's.

=== Peacekeeping operations in former Yugoslavia ===
In 1999, Battery A, a detachment of Forward Observers and support elements from the Headquarters and Service Battery were deployed with Task Force Hawk during Operation Noble Anvil in Albania and Kosovo. The entire unit was deployed to Kosovo from November 23, 2000, to May 28, 2001, in support of peacekeeping operations in the former Yugoslavia.

=== Operation Iraqi Freedom ===
In April 2003, 4-27 FA returned to the Kuwaiti desert in preparation for Operation Iraqi Freedom (OIF), the first of three year or longer deployments for the battalion during the 2nd Iraq War. With the exception of some Forward Observers on loan to infantry units, the bulk of the battalion saw no combat during the initial invasion. Although this peaceful period did not last long.

Arriving in Baghdad on May 1, 2003, the same day of President Bush's "Mission Accomplished Speech", 4-27FA assumed responsibility for the Al Karkh district in central Baghdad, Iraq. While not an infantry unit, the battalion traded in their howitzers for Humvees and fought as a motorized infantry battalion, conducting only occasional counter battery missions against insurgent mortars and rocket attacks. Elements of 4-27 FA carried out full-spectrum operations in Operations Iron Hammer, Iron Justice, Iron Grip, Longstreet, Iron Bullet, Iron Promise and Iron Sabre during this time frame. For the next year, the battalion's other assignments included hunting down the remaining Fedayeen forces, patrolling and keeping peace in the Muhallah's (neighborhoods) inside the Al Karkh district, as well as guarding several strategic points from vandals and insurgents. Most notably, the UN administered food warehouses and distribution center in Baghdad's central railyard.

In April 2004, the battalion's deployment was extended by three months. 4-27FA was tasked with retaking and keeping clear the supply routes south of Baghdad, around Iskandariah and Al Kut, from a radical militia that had taken control of much of the rural area outside of the city. Within 60 days, 4-27 FA and the rest of the 2nd BCT (1AD) task force defeated local militia forces and restored (albeit temporarily) stability to the surrounding region. The battalion redeployed to Baumholder, Germany in July 2004 after 15 months of continuous action.

In November 2005, the battalion deployed again to Kuwait in support of Operation Iraqi Freedom. This time, the battalion was formally reorganized and trained as a motorized rifle battalion, serving as part of the theater reserve in the 1AD. Large elements from the battalion, including all the Forward Observers, were called up to engage and suppress various insurgent groups in different hotspots throughout Iraq. The battalion redeployed back to Baumholder, Germany in November 2006.

On April 7, 2008, during the height of Sectarian violence in Iraq (2006–08) the battalion deployed for a final time to the city of Madain in Iraq as motorized infantry. In late October 2008, the battalion was reassigned (except for C Battery) to the Macmahdia Province (south of Baghdad). After reestablishing order, the task force handed control off to local Iraq forces and redeployed back to Baumholder, Germany in late May 2009. On July 15, 2009, the entire unit left Germany after three generations of garrison duty and moved to its current homebase at Fort Bliss, TX.

== Current role ==
The current 4th Battalion, 27th Field Artillery "Iron Thunder" battalion was reactivated at Fort Bliss, Texas on September 15, 2010, with the 2nd Heavy Brigade Combat Team, 1st AD. In November 2010, the battalion assumed its current mission as a test and evaluation force for future artillery weapons, munitions, programs and tactics. In support of this mission, 4-27 FA became the US Army's first composite direct support field artillery battalion, equipped with both self-propelled and towed howitzers. In 2011, 4-27 FA was the first unit to test and evaluate the Army's newest howitzer, the M109A7, under the Paladin Integrated Management (PIM) program.

In the summer of 2017, 4-27 FA, along with its parent 2nd Brigade, 1st Armored Division, was released from the Brigade Modernization Command (BMC) ending its role as a testing platform for emerging technologies and systems under testing. 4-27 FA and 2/1 AD transitioned back to the US Army Forces Command (FORSCOM) "ready-pool" for overseas deployments.

In October 2017, 4-27 FA along with 2nd Brigade, 1st Armored Division deployed overseas to Kuwait, with detachments to Iraq, as part of US Central Command (CENTCOM) in support of Operation Spartan Shield and Operation Inherent Resolve. Additionally, the battalion supported the Brigade with multiple partnership exercises in concert with allied forces from Jordan, the Kingdom of Saudi Arabia, Oman, the United Arab Emirates and others.

In July 2018, the battalion returned from their overseas deployment and transitioned to training, reset and preparation for future missions.

In early 2020, the battalion made ready to deploy to Europe but due to COVID-19 the deployment was cancelled. Upon redeployment you Fort Bliss, Bravo Battery and Charlie Battery deployed to the Middle East in support of Operation Spartan Shield in August, 2020. Charlie Battery left their 6 howitzers in Kuwait and deployed to Saudi Arabia to provide a security force element, defending and supporting various military assets that played a vital role for Task Force Spartan, Operation Spartan Shield.

In April through May 2021 Charlie Battery & Bravo Battery returned from the deployment to begin to reset, train, and prepare for future operations.

== Current equipment ==
- M109a6 Paladin self-propelled 155mm howitzer
- AN/TPQ-53 Radar System
- AN/TPQ-50 Radar System
- AN/TPQ-36 Firefinder radar

== See also ==
- Forward observers in the U.S. military
- Field artillery (United States)
