= Sawsan Ali Sharifi =

Sawsan Ali Majid Al-Sharifi (Arabic: سوسن علي ماجد الشريفي) (born 1956) was made the Minister of Agriculture in Iyad Allawi's Iraqi Interim Government in 2004.

== Biography ==
Sawsan Ali Sharifi was born in Baghdad in 1956. After completing her Bachelor of Science (1977) in Animal production from the University of Baghdad. She moved to the United States to pursue studying at Iowa State University (ISU) and earned a master's degree in 1981 in Animal Science, and earned a PhD. in 1983.

After her return to Iraq, Sharifi was appointed on the Scientific Research Council in 1984. Six years later, she was promoted to the post of major researcher. More than 40 of her research papers were published in Iraqi Journal of Agriculture and she edited the publication for several years.

Al Sharifi also served on the State Board of Agricultural Research. She conducted research on livestock in Iraq and appointed as the National Coordinator to the Food and Agriculture Organization FAO for the buffalo research. Following the 2003 invasion of Iraq, Al Sharifi was appointed as the deputy minister of Agriculture during the Coalition Provisional Authority. She was promoted to the cabinet minister post in Iraqi Interim Government (June 2004) under Ayad Allawi. The following year, she secured a seat in Iraqi List and was elected to the Transition National Assembly and served on its Committee for Agriculture.

To aid the takeover of Genetically engineered food plants being sold to Iraqi farmers, who then had to pay large sums of money for the pesticides and fertilizers and taxes on the yield, Al Sharifi came out in support of government aid: "We need Iraqi farmers to be competitive, so we decided to subsidize inputs like pesticides, fertilizers, improved seeds and so on. We cut down on the other subsidies, but we have to become competitive."

In July 2017, Commission on Public Integrity sentenced Sharifi to seven-year imprisonment for corruption. She had signed a contract between her ministry and a private firm for supplying portable excavators. The commission in its inquiry, found that the amount approved was beyond the limit prescribed for ministers. Orders were issued for seizure of her property. Later, the sentence was reduced to five years.

The Court concerned with integrity issues / the presidency of the Baghdad Appeal Court / Federal Rusafa / Supreme Judicial Council issued on 3/12/2019 its decision to stop the legal procedures against her according to the provisions of Article 305, and thus the minister was acquitted.

The court relied on Ministerial Order 6317 on 02-25-2019 issued by the Ministry of Agriculture to waive the case before the competent court, which is based on the recommendations of the central inclusion committee to investigate the extent of the responsibility of Dr. Sawsan Ali Majid Al Sharifi, former Minister of Agriculture, and the decision of the specialized technical committee approved by the administration of the General Company for Agricultural Supplies regarding the contract between the General Company for Agricultural Supplies and the German Company for Water and Energy (GWE) to supply 7 well drilling rigs with spare tools, the Iraqi Ministry of Agriculture decided that there was no waste or loss of public money and that the minister was not responsible for any damage due to the failure to implement the contract mainly. Rather, only the LC was opened for this contract, contrary to the recommendations of the Minister at the time. The contract was not implemented in the first place, and accordingly, the minister was acquitted.
