= Mission Command Training Program =

U.S. Army worldwide deployable Combat Training Center

Mission Command Training Program (MCTP – formerly the Battle Command Training Program), based at Fort Leavenworth, Kansas, is the U.S. Army's only worldwide deployable Combat Training Center. MCTP provides full spectrum operations training support for senior commanders and their staffs so they can be successful in any mission in any operational environment. Its Senior Mentors counsel and offer their experience to Army senior commanders, subordinate commanders and staff. Additionally, MCTP's professional observer-trainers assist units with objective feedback and suggestions for improvement.

== MCTP Support to the Army ==
MCTP serves as an engine of change for implementing doctrine by providing feedback to the Army on future doctrine, unit organization and application of that doctrine. No other entity in the Army can incorporate division and corps headquarters into the same exercise. MCTP's annual collection of key observations made at brigades through Army service component command levels enables the Army's future force to grow and develop from lessons learned. During 2016, MCTP supported five corps and division level warfighter exercises, five ASCC exercises, and six National Guard brigade combat team warfighters. Each exercise generally requires a one-year planning cycle including multiple training and planning events to enable training in execution.

MCTP remains a premier Combat Training Center to train brigades, divisions, corps, and Army Service Component Command (ASCC) level headquarters on their mission essential tasks needed to support Unified Land Operations and train joint functions within select headquarters to support their role as a joint task force. These exercises are conducted in a distributed manner and consist of a multi-echelon, total Army force (AC, NG, RC) and stress SOF interdependence. MCTP provides a trained world-class opposing force consisting of Soldiers and contractors to portray a free-thinking, near peer, hybrid threat. MCTP features professional observers, coaches and trainers (OC/Ts) and senior mentors (retired 1-4 star general officers). This cadre enables staffs and commanders to train on their prospective METLs and assess their readiness. MCTP supports the collective training of Army units as directed by the Chief of Staff of the Army and scheduled by Forces Command in accordance with the Army Force Generation process at worldwide locations in order to train Leaders and provide commanders the opportunity to train on mission command in Unified Land Operations. MCTP personnel trained 16 general officers in 2016 across Army Service Component Commands, 10 divisions and 2 Expeditionary Sustainment Commands.

== History ==
The Mission Command Training Program is the United States Army's capstone combat training center (CTC). MCTP started off as the Battle Command Training Program (BCTP) in 1987. Its original goal was to improve battlefield command and control through stressful and realistic combined arms training in a combat environment. BCTP met this need while also providing Division and Corps computer-driven simulation training. Effective, 10 May 2011, BCTP was officially re-designated the U.S. Army Mission Command Training Program, MCTP.

The command conducts or supports combined arms training that replicates joint-interagency-intergovernmental-multinational operations in a decisive action environment at worldwide locations for Brigades, Divisions, Corps, Army Service Combatant Commands (ASCCs), Joint Force Land Component Commands (JFLCCs), and Joint Task Forces (JTFs) in order to create training experiences that enable the Army's senior commanders to develop current, relevant, campaign-quality, joint and expeditionary mission command instincts and skills. Most, if not all, of today's general officers have participated in a MCTP exercise at some point in their careers.

From its inception, MCTP has featured key elements of the CTC training model such as a "free-thinking" opposing force (OPFOR), the use of experienced observer/trainers, advanced technology to gather data and a basic rotational sequence from choice of scenario through a warfighter exercise to an after action review. These elements were combined with innovations unique to MCTP such as computer-simulated battle action, mobile observer trainer teams, and senior mentors for unit commanders to eliminate the collective training gap at higher echelons for command and control training.

The Gulf War and the end of the Cold War prompted the first calls to widen the program's mission to address the dramatically altered world situation. From then on, MCTP's mission range expanded both in the levels of headquarters it exercised and in the levels of conflict it simulated. MCTP added two teams, Team C, in 1992, to provide Brigade-level training in the new Brigade Command and Battle Staff Training (BCBST) program, and Team D in 1993 to pick up the mission of joint training for Army units operating at the joint task force (JTF) or Army force (ARFOR) level.

After 9/11, MCTP established a special temporary mobile training team to conduct installation force protection seminars and readiness exercises. In preparation for Operation Iraqi Freedom, MCTP developed a special seminar series on counterinsurgency for all deploying Brigades. In 2008, MCTP continued to meet the needs of the Army with Teams Sierra and Foxtrot, which conducted seminars and embedded exercises for functional and multifunctional Brigades.

Initially composed of one exercise team, Team A, and a group of civilian contractors, MCTP executed its first warfighter exercise in January 1988 with the 9th Infantry Division (Motorized) at Fort Lewis, Washington. This validated the concept for a CTC collective training exercise for Divisions and Corps. Later in the year, MCTP established Team B to increase rotational capacity and the world-class opposing force. MCTP also became a separate unit under the operational control of what is now the Combined Arms Center, Training.

Currently, MCTP consists of eight operations groups (OPSGRPs). OPSGRPs Alpha and Delta are missioned to train ASCC, Corps and Division-level staffs; OPSGRP Charlie conducts Brigade warfighter exercises (BWFX); OPSGRPs Bravo and Foxtrot train functional and multi-functional Brigades; OPSGRP Juliet trains Special Forces units; OPSGRP Sierra trains sustainment Brigades; OPSGRP X-Ray is responsible for exercise planning, exercise control and scenario design.

The program has consistently shown its ability to simultaneously participate and contribute to current operations and adapt its training programs to provide better support. MCTP will remain an "engine of change" for the current and future Army.

MCTP was awarded The Army Superior Unit Award on 15 October 2009 for outstanding meritorious service from 1 January 2007 to 31 December 2008 and again on 5 May 2014 for outstanding meritorious service from October 2010 to 30 September 2011.

== Organizational structure ==
Mission Command Training Program consists of eight operation groups and a supporting unit of the 505th Command and Control Wing, Detachment 1 (USAF). Each of the operations groups trains commanders and staff on effective integration of warfighter functions in a joint-interagency-multinational operating environment to achieve operational mission command. Operations groups OC/Ts provide high-quality academic seminars and formal after action reviews during the WFXs to improve the readiness and combat effectives of each training audience.

Operations Groups A and D:These Groups Deploy worldwide to conduct decisive action and theater specific training in unified land operations to support the readiness and combat effectiveness of Army Service Component Commands, Corps and Divisions.

Operations Groups B and F:These Groups Deploy worldwide to conduct decisive action and theater specific training in unified land operations in support of functional and multi-functional Brigades, such as aviation and military police Brigades, to improve their readiness and combat effectiveness.

Operations Group C:This Group Deploys worldwide to conduct decisive action and theater-specific training in unified land operations in support of Army National Guard component Brigade combat teams and active component functional and multi-functional brigades in order to improve their readiness and combat effectiveness.

Operations Group J:This Group Deploys worldwide to conduct decisive action and theater-specific training in unified land operations in support of Special Operations Forces with oversight of all Army special operations forces (ARSOF) including civil affairs, military information support operations (MISO) and interagency tactical assets. Observe, coach and train conventional force commanders and staffs on the integration, interoperability and interdependence with Special Operations Forces.

Operations Group S:This Group Deploys worldwide to conduct decisive action and theater-specific training in unified land operations in support of sustainment brigades and expeditionary sustainment commands in order to improve their readiness and combat effectiveness.

Operations Group X:This Group is Responsible for the design, planning and control of each multi-echelon, distributed WFX that replicate a realistic, relevant and rigorous strategic environment for the conduct of unified land operations in support of Army senior mission commander training objectives. Leads MCTP's exercise planning process, including exercise life cycle (ELC) events, ensuring all aspects of exercise design are coordinated and synchronized within MCTP and with external training partners and training audiences.

505TH Command and Control Wing, Detachment 1 (United States Air Force):This Unit Deploys worldwide to conduct decisive action and theater-specific training in support of the integration of airpower and application of joint firepower, air and space capabilities and doctrine, into unified land operations.

== Observer, Coach, Trainers ==
MCTP provides senior mentors and observer coach/trainers during a WFX exercise for the following formations' commanders and staff: Corps, Division, Theater Sustainment Command, Expeditionary Sustainment Command, Functional/Multi-Functional Support Brigades, Special Forces Groups, and Sustainment Brigades. They play a critical role in providing feedback to the unit, informally, through everyday interactions and, formally, through mid and final after action reviews (AARs) plus the final exercise report (FER). These events give the training audience actions to consider for sustainment and improvement.

OC/Ts facilitate mission command training through 24-hour coverage for unit command groups, staff, and key leaders in their respective command posts, as well as staff/warfighting function and integrating cells throughout the WFX. OC/Ts cover the gamut of warfighting functions including mission command, movement and maneuver, fires, sustainment, protection and intelligence. Officer observer, coach, trainers (OC/Ts) are lieutenant colonels or senior majors who are branch qualified, Command and General Staff College graduates and have extensive field experience. Enlisted OC/Ts are sergeant first classes to sergeant majors who are either United States Sergeants Major Academy graduates or have attended the Battle Staff Course.

Observer, coach, trainers are personally selected by the MCTP commander and a Chief of Operations Group (COG). They are subject matter experts on doctrine and in their specific warfighting functions. They are also certified through a rigorous training program including providing feedback using the After-Action Review process. During a warfighter, they are located at unit command posts and tactical operating centers to observe the operations process. An assignment as an observer, coach/trainer (OC/T) is a rewarding and a recognized professionally broadening experience. There is no better place to truly understand how the Army fights at the Brigade and above levels.

The OC/T experience provides officers and NCOs with deeper substantive knowledge of their military profession, increases their proficiency in operational art and the practical application of doctrine, and exposes them to the challenges the Army could face in future conflicts. Officers and NCOs at MCTP are able to gain multiple careers worth of experience in a short time through observation of their training audiences. Furthermore, OC/Ts gain a unique perspective of the Army's trending challenges and their solutions. OC/Ts have the opportunity to help shape the way the Army will fight now and in the future. OC/Ts are not evaluators and, at the end of the day, OC/Ts are judged by what they impart on training units and how they have helped them grow warfighting skills and improve their readiness.

== Senior Mentors ==
Senior Mentors mentor Corps, Division and Brigade commanders prior to and during warfighter exercises. Assist the commander prior to exercises with establishing training objectives, participate in mission command seminars, assist with development of the after action review and provide feedback on significant observations and trends. Participate in theater reconnaissance, provide feedback to Army senior leaders, and assist in future training and exercise development.

Provide expert knowledge in integrating Training and Doctrine Command (TRADOC), Army, and Department of Defense (DoD) policies, and programs, with extensive background and experience in developing adaptive leaders. Are astute experts in the art and science of designing today's Army modular and future combat force while maximizing institutional learning and adaptation. Review and integrate proposals to train and develop an innovative generating force that will shape and link it seamlessly to the operating force to maximize Army learning and adaptation.

Apply knowledge and experience of TRADOC, Army, and DoD programs to mentor general officers, senior Leaders and staff members, analyze, research and integrate doctrinal information for Mission Command Training Program (MCTP), war-gaming exercises, warfighting courses, operational planning, tactical and operational exercises and decision making exercises for the commanding general Combined Arms Center (CAC), TRADOC, and other high level Army and DoD personnel. This includes joint, combined, and allied exercises designed to prepare military leaders and units for combat operations.

== Warfighter Exercises ==
The warfighter exercise is a conditions-based training event using TRADOC's Decisive Action Training Environment (DATE) for corps, divisions and brigades. The DATE is the common environment found in all combat training centers.

Each year, MCTP supports five multi-echelon (corps, division, and brigade) warfighter exercises, five Army Service Component Command exercises and six National Guard Brigade Combat Team warfighters. MCTP warfighter exercises can incorporate division and corps headquarters into the same exercise. These training experiences enable our Army's senior leaders the ability to develop current, campaign-quality, joint and expeditionary mission command instincts and skills.

These exercises are conducted in a distributed manner and consist of a multi-echelon, total Army force (Active Duty, Army National Guard and Army Reserve) and stress SOF interdependence at locations worldwide.
