= Tishk International University =

Private university in Kurdistan, Iraq

- زانکۆی نێودەوڵەتیی تیشک
- Motto: "The Future is Here"
- Type: Private
- Established: 2008
- President: Sultan T. Abu-Orabi
- Director: Idris Hadi Salih, Mamar
- Location: 100 mt. Street, near Filkey Baz (Square), across Qazi Muhammad, 44001, Erbil, Kurdistan Region; 36°10′14″N 43°57′41″E
- Campus: Erbil Campus, Sulaimani Campus
- Colors: Brown; Orange
- Nickname: TIU
- Website: www.tiu.edu.iq
- ISO 9001:2015 CERTIFIED

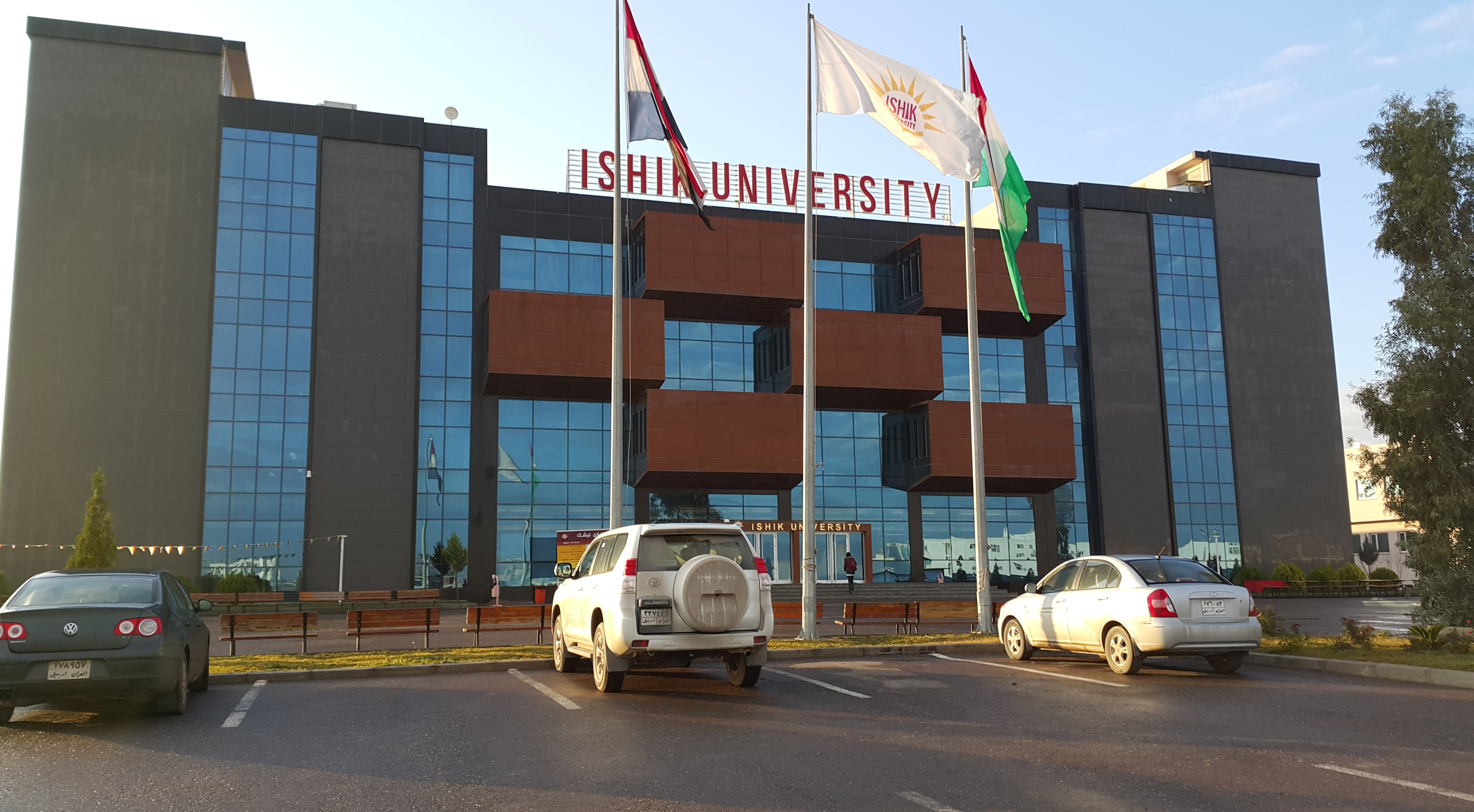
Tishk International University Erbil

Tishk International University (Kurdish زانکۆی نێودەوڵەتیی تیشک, Zankoy Tîşk) (TIU) is a private university established in 2008 in Erbil-Kurdistan, Iraq and owned by local and International investors and educators. Tishk International University is granted ISO 9001:2015 Certificate for the Quality Management System and is a member in the Union of Arabic Universities.

== History of Tishk International University ==
Tishk International University (TIU), previously known as Ishik University, was officially founded in 2008 with a ceremony in which former Kurdistan Regional Government Prime Minister Nechirvan Barzani, parliamentarians and bureaucrats, along with parliamentarians from Turkey were present.

- In 2008–2009, the education started with the English Prep only with 160 students on the Brayaty Campus located on 60 meter road. During 2009–2010, students were accepted in five bachelor's degree Programs and Eight English Prep Programs. In the same year, the campus was enlarged by the conversion of an unused area of an Industrial School and some other buildings into the Education Faculty. This place served as the old campus of the university for about three years.
- In 2010–2011, all the faculties covering nine Bachelor Programs, except for Prep School, were carried to the new campus on 100 meter road. The next year, Prep School was also transferred to the new campus where two buildings were in service: the main building and the Dentistry Faculty building. During 2011–2013, it became the Center of TOEFL and Continuing Education.
- 2014-2015 Academic Year has become a turning point for the University from many angles:
  - A new building dedicated to the Faculty of Education was constructed.
  - Sulaimani campus branch was opened and started education with prep classes of Engineering and Business Faculties.
  - The Research Center and Engineering Consultation Bureau were established.
  - The University was certified with ISO 9001:2008 Quality Management System.
  - Memorandum of Understanding with more than 40 universities from around 20 countries all over the world was signed.
  - Student Exchange Programs started with 16 students.
  - Double Diploma opportunity with University of North American University in Houston, Texas was implemented.
  - Ishik became a member of the Global Engineering Deans Council (GEDC).
  - Ishik became a member of the Association of Arab Universities.
- In 2015–2016, the University started the process of gaining the International Academic Accreditation Certificate for the Civil Engineering Programme.
- In 2016–2017, the following were achieved:
  - Civil Engineering Programme was granted the International Academic Accreditation Certificate without any conditions by the German Agency ZeVA which is a member in the European Association of Quality Assurance of Higher Education 'ENQA' and a member in the German Union of Accreditation 'ECA'.
  - Three new Bachelor programmes were established: Surveying and Geomatics Engineering, Petroleum and Mining Engineering and Mechatronics Engineering.
  - Joint Master Programmes have been opened in cooperation with Erbil Polytechnic University in three specialities: Civil Engineering, Computer Engineering and Mechanical and Energy Engineering.
  - Staff Exchange Programme was applied with Keylana University in Sri Lanka.
  - Official recognition of Ishik University by Ministry of Higher Education in Iraq on August 24, 2017.
- In 2017-2018
  - Pharmacy Bachelor program was established.
  - According to the Webometrics Ranking results published in January and July 2018, Ishik University was ranked number one among all private universities in the Kurdistan Region and in Iraq.
  - In May 2018, Ishik was certified to ISO 9001:2015 Quality Management Systems Certificate by Bureau Veritas Certification Holding SAS-UK Branch. The Certificate was accredited by the United Kingdom Accreditation Services Body (UKAS).
  - In June 2018, the Law bachelor's degree Program of Ishik University has been accredited for five years without any condition by the Quality Assurance and Accreditation Center of the Association of Arab Universities (AAU).
- In 2018-2019
  - In Feb 2019, both Computer Engineering Program and Information Technology Program were granted the International Academic Accreditation Certificate by the German Agency “ZeVA”.
- In 2019 the university's name was changed ('''Tishk International University''')
- In 2021-2022
  - First Graduation of the Department of Pharmacy.

== Administration ==
- Board Head - Idris Hadi Salih
- President - Sultan T. Abu-Orabi
- Vice President - Mehmet Özdemir
- Vice President for Admin. & Fin. - Fatih Cura

Governing bodies of Tishk International University are the Higher Board of Trustees and the University Council. In addition to these governing bodies, the Academic Evaluation and Quality Assurance Board has been established. In the lower levels, there is a 'Faculty Council' at each faculty and a 'Departmental Board' at each department.

== Units at TIU ==
- Prep School
- Continuing Education Center
- CISCO Networking Academy
- TIU Research Center
- TOEFL IBT Test Center
- Tishk Career Center
- Engineering Consultation Bureau (IECB)

== Programmes offered at Tishk International University ==
1. Dentistry (5 academic years)
2. Pharmacy (5 academic years)
3. Nursing (4 academic years)
4. Medical Analyses (4 academic years)
5. Architecture Engineering (5 academic years)
6. Civil Engineering (4 academic years)
7. Interior Design Engineering 4 academic years)
8. Computer Engineering (4 academic years )
9. Mechatronic Engineering (4 academic years)
10. Petroleum and Mining Engineering (4 academic years)
11. Surveying and Geomatics Engineering (4 academic years)
12. Law (5 academic years)
13. Business and Management (4 academic years)
14. Banking and Finance (4 academic years)
15. Accounting (4 academic years)
16. International Relations and Diplomacy (4 academic years)
17. English Language Teaching (4 academic years)
18. Mathematics Education (4 academic years)
19. Physics Education (4 academic years)
20. Biology Education (4 academic years)
21. Information Technology (4 academic years)
22. Cybersecurity (4 academic years)
23. Artificial Intelligence (4 academic years)
24. Anesthesia (4 academic years)
25. Nutrition and Dietetics (4 academic years)
26. Medical Technical Radiology (4 academic years)
27. Physiotherapy (4 academic years)

== Internationalization at Tishk International University ==
In the following, some measures taken by Ishik University to increase the internationalization at all levels are described.

- Employing International Staff

There are more than 80 international staff working in both academic and non-academic positions, being from various countries such as Turkey, Kazakhstan, Turkmenistan, India and United States.

- Enrollment of International Students

The rules and regulations of Tishk International University allow international students from any country to join any study programme within the University. In the academic year 2015–2016, the number of international students studying at Tishk University reached 100 students.

- Applying International Standards such as ISO 9001:2008

In 2014, the University Council decided to implement ISO 9001:2008 standard at ISHIK University which sets out the criteria for a Quality Management System and which is implemented by over one million companies and organizations over 170 countries. For two years, the documents and the requirements were prepared and fulfilled till finally the external auditors certified Ishik University on June 4, 2015. In addition to increasing the quality within the University, ISO 9001:2008 helps to have access to more memorandums and cooperation with other national and international universities and organizations.

- Applying Bologna Process

Tishk University has implemented many parts (but yet not all) of Bologna Process such as:

1. Credit System
2. Some Structural Reforms
3. Internal Quality Assurance
4. External Quality Assurance
5. Academic Mobility
6. Values and Fundamental Principles
- Students Exchange Programmes

International Relations Office (IRO) was established at Tishk University in 2013. IRO is a unit which furthers and supports the exchange of students between the higher education institutions of other countries. So far 22 students from different departments have utilized the Exchange Programme.

== Teaching Language and Credit System ==
Teaching language at Tishk University is English, except the law programme which is taught in Arabic. Also Tishk University has adopted ECTS (the European Credit Transfer System) to assess the achievement of expected learning outcomes. At Tishk the academic year is divided into two main terms: fall and spring.

== Universities in Collaboration with Tishk International University ==
Tishk International University has signed memorandums with 53 universities in various countries such as: Albania, Azerbaijan, Bosnia-Herzegovina, Cambodia, Cyprus, Georgia, Germany, Kazakhstan, Malaysia, Pakistan, Poland, Romania, Turkey and United States.
