= Idris Hadi Salih =

Doctor Idris Hadi Salih

Head of Board of Trustees and the President of Tishk International University
- In office 2016–Present

Ministry of Higher Education and Scientific Research, Kurdistan Regional Government
- Incumbent
- Assumed office 2006 - 2009

Personal details
- Born: 1 July 1952 (age 74) Erbil, Iraq
- Education: Sulaimani University; Leningrad University

Idris Hadi Salih (born 1952) ادريس هادي صالح, is the Iraqi Kurdish Head of Board of Trustees and the President of Tishk International University, Erbil, Kurdistan Region. He has taken several ministerial positions in Iraq and Kurdistan Region. He is a former Minister of Higher Education and Scientific Research in the Kurdistan Regional Government (KRG) (2006-2009), former Minister of Labor and Social Affairs in Iraq (2005-2006), former Deputy Minister of Higher Education and Scientific Research in Iraq (2004-2005), former Minister of Municipalities and Tourism in KRG (1998), former Minister of Industry and Energy in KRG (1996) and former Minister of Transportation and Communication in KRG (1992-1996). Dr Idris also hold the position of president of Salahaddin University in Erbil, Iraq during 1999-2000, and head of Electrical Engineering Department, College of Engineering at Salahaddin University during 1985-1990. He speaks Kurdish, Arabic, English, Russian and some Turkish.

== Education ==
Idris Hadi Salih earned his bachelor's degree in physics from Sulaimani University, Iraq in 1976. He then traveled to Russia and earned his master's degree in Communication Engineering at Leningrad University, Saint Petersburg, Russia in 1982. He also got a PhD Degree in Communication Engineering (Technical Science) at Leningrad University, Saint Petersburg, Russia in 1985.
