= Narmin Othman =

Iraqi minister for Environmental in the Nouri al-Maliki Government

- نيرمين عثمان
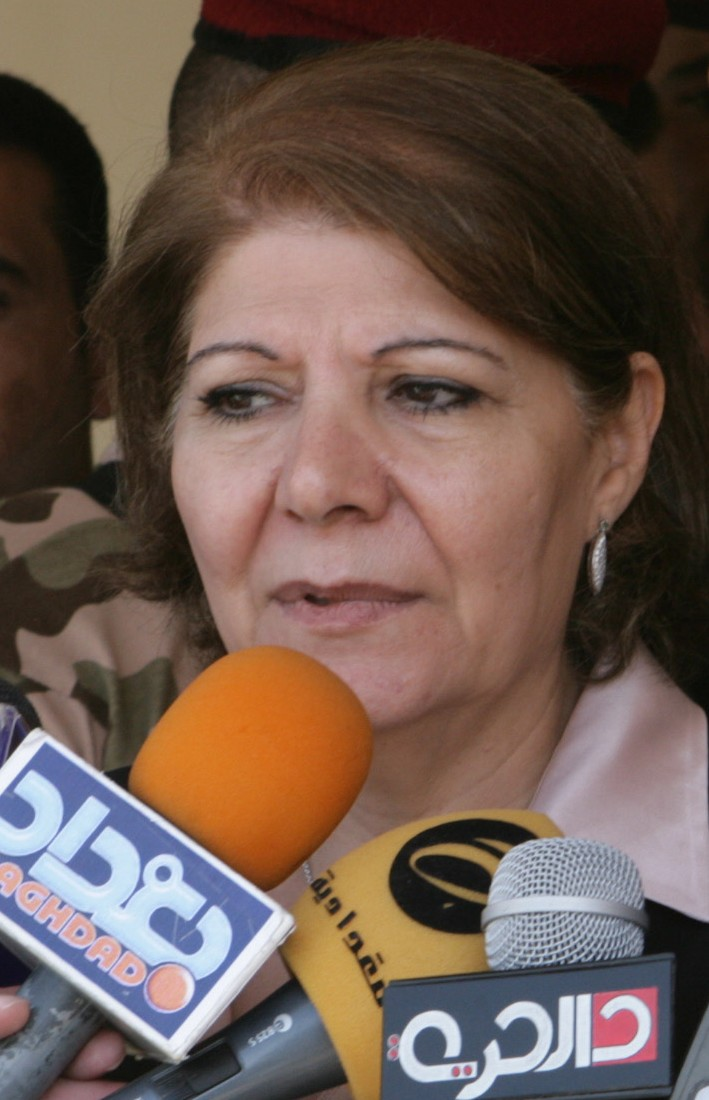
- Othman in Ramadi, Iraq, in 2008

Minister of Environment
- In office May 2005 – 21 December 2010
- Preceded by: Abderrahman Sadik Karim
- Succeeded by: Sargon Lazar Slewa

Minister of Women's Affairs
- In office 2004 – May 2005
- Preceded by: Position established
- Succeeded by: Azhar Abdel Karim al-Shaikhli

Personal details
- Spouse: Daro Sheikh Noori (died 2004)

Narmin Othman (Note: Arabic: نيرمين عثمان; Kurdish: Nermîn Osman) (born c. 1948) is an Iraqi Kurdish politician. She served as Minister of Environment in the government of Nouri al-Maliki, a post she also held in the Iraqi Transitional Government. She also served as Minister of Women's Affairs in the Iraqi Interim Government and a Minister of Education in the Iraqi Kurdistan Region from 1992.

She escaped an assassination attempt in August 2005 when gunmen attacked her convoy.

Her family were active in the Kurdish peshmerga fighting Saddam Hussein, the latter of whom had her uncle and brother-in-law executed. Her husband, Daro Sheikh Noori, was imprisoned for five years where he was tortured. She and her husband went into exile in Sweden in 1984, returning to Iraq in 1992. Her husband was a PUK Politburo member, who died in 2004, the same year that she was offered a post in the national government.
