= Iraqi Interim Government =

2004–2005 US-controlled caretaker government of Iraq

- Cabinet of Iraq

- Date formed: 28 June 2004
- Date dissolved: 3 May 2005

People and organizations
- Head of government: Ayad Allawi
- Status in legislature: Coalition

The Iraqi Interim Government was created by the United States and its coalition allies as a caretaker government to govern Iraq until the drafting of the new constitution following the National Assembly election conducted on January 30, 2005. The Iraqi Interim Government itself took the place of the Coalition Provisional Authority (and the Iraq Interim Governing Council) on June 28, 2004, and was replaced by the Iraqi Transitional Government on May 3, 2005.

== Organization ==
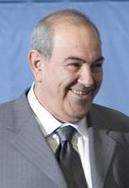
Interim Prime Minister Iyad Allawi.

The Iraqi Interim Government was recognized by the U.S., the United Nations, the Arab League and several other countries as being the sovereign government of Iraq (see Iraqi sovereignty for more information). The U.S. retained significant de facto power in the country and critics contend that the government existed only at the pleasure of the United States and other coalition countries and considered it a U.S. puppet government, whose military forces still remained in Iraq.

=== The law and the head of government ===
The government's head of government was Prime Minister Iyad Allawi and his deputy was the influential and charismatic Barham Salih. The ceremonial head of state was President Ghazi Mashal Ajil al-Yawer.

Absent a permanent constitution, the new government operated under the Law of Administration for the State of Iraq for the Transitional Period.

Allawi was a former member of the Iraq Interim Governing Council and was chosen by the council to be the Interim Prime Minister of Iraq to govern the country beginning with the United States' handover of sovereignty (June 28, 2004) until national elections, scheduled for early 2005. Although many believe the decision was reached largely on the advice of United Nations special envoy to Iraq, Lakhdar Brahimi, The New York Times reported that Brahimi only endorsed him reluctantly after pressure from U.S. officials, including Paul Bremer, the former US Iraqi Administrator. Two weeks later, Brahimi announced his resignation, due to "great difficulties and frustration." Allawi is often described as a moderate Shia (a member of Iraq's majority faith) chosen for his secular background and ties to the United States. However, his image has been undermined with the media suggesting that Allawi was Washington's puppet.

== Actions of the Interim Government ==
After his interim government assumed legal custody of Saddam Hussein and re-introduced capital punishment, Allawi gave assurances that he would not interfere with the trial and would accept any court decisions. In an interview with Dubai-based TV station al-Arabiya he said: "As for the execution, that is for the court to decide—so long as a decision is reached impartially and fairly."

=== "Precedents" and accusations ===
In early July 2004, Allawi issued an unprecedented statement claiming that the Iraqi interim government had provided intelligence for the U.S. air strikers with 500 and 1000 pound (220 and 450 kg) bombs on Fallujah in July. Later he announced new security measures, including the right to impose martial law and curfews, as well as a new counter-terrorist intelligence unit, the General Security Directorate. Allawi vowed to crush the Iraqi insurgency, saying he would "annihilate those terrorist groups".

On July 17, The Sydney Morning Herald alleged that one week before the handover of sovereignty, Allawi himself summarily executed six suspected insurgents at a Baghdad police station. The allegations are backed up by two independent sources and the execution is said to have taken place in presence of about a dozen Iraqi police, four American security men and Interior Minister Falah al-Naqib. Allawi reportedly said that the execution was to "send a clear message to the police on how to deal with insurgents." Both Allawi's office and Naqib have denied the report. US ambassador John Negroponte did not clearly deny the allegations. On July 18, Iraqi militants offered a $285,000 reward for anyone who could kill Iyad Allawi.

=== Allawi's policies ===
In August, Allawi closed the Iraqi office of Al Jazeera for thirty days. His minister Hoshiyar Zebari deplored the "one-sided and biased coverage" and declared that the interim government "will not allow some people to hide behind the slogan of freedom of the press and media." Allawi also appointed ex-Baathist and former Saddam intelligence officer Ibrahim Janabi as the head of the Higher Media Commission, a regulator of Iraq's media. The banning of Al Jazeera was widely criticised in the Arab world and the West, for example by Reporters Sans Frontières who called it "a serious blow to press freedom".

The negotiations that followed the fighting between Muqtada al-Sadr's militia and joint US/Iraqi forces in Najaf ended when Allawi withdrew his emissary Mouwaffaq al-Rubaie on August 14. An al-Sadr spokesman alleged that they "had agreed with Rubaie on all points but Allawi called him back and he ended the issue."

=== Criticism ===
Under the US-created interim government, human rights suffered, as displacements on sectarian grounds broke out with the security services being alleged to be behind hundreds of disappearances, while US counter-insurgency destroyed homes and infrastructure such that by 2005, women and children made up 20% of civilian deaths.

Allawi has been heavily criticised by members of his own government. Justice minister Malik Dohan al-Hassan resigned over the issue of an arrest warrant of Ahmed Chalabi. Vice president Ibrahim al-Jafari commented on the attacks against al-Sadr: "War is the worst choice, and it is only used by a bad politician." Another Iraqi official said: "There are brush fires burning out of control all over the place from terrorists and insurgents, and he starts a new bonfire in Najaf."

While the strategy of "eliminat[ing] Moqtada Sadr's political movement" by "crushing his military power" instead of integrating him into the political process received mostly praise in the West, the Arab press levelled harsh criticism of Allawi's handling of the Najaf situation.

== Members of the Interim Government ==
As appointed on 28 June 2004:

- President: Ghazi Yawer (Sunni Arab tribal leader)
- Vice President: Ibrahim Jaafari (Islamic Dawa Party)
- Vice President: Rowsch Shaways (Kurdistan Democratic Party)
- Prime Minister: Iyad Allawi (Iraqi National Accord)
- Deputy Prime Minister for National Security: Barham Salih (Patriotic Union of Kurdistan)
- Foreign Minister: Hoshyar Zebari (Kurdistan Democratic Party)
- Finance Minister: Adel Abdul Mahdi (SCIRI)
- Defence Minister: Hazem Shalan al-Khuzaei (Iraqi National Congress)
- Interior Minister: Falah Hassan al-Naqib
- Minister of Oil: Thamir Ghadhban
- Minister of Justice: Malik Dohan al-Hassan
- Minister of Human Rights: Bakhityar Amin
- Minister of Electricity: Ayham al-Samarie
- Minister of Health: Alaa Abdessaheb al-Alwan
- Minister of Communication: Mohammed Ali Hakim
- Minister of Housing: Omar Farouk
- Minister of Public Works: Nesreen Mustafa Berwari
- Minister of Science and Technology: Rashad Mandan Omar
- Minister of Planning: Mahdi al-Hafez
- Minister of Trade: Mohammed al-Joubri
- Minister of Sport and Youth: Ali Faik al-Ghaban
- Minister of Transportation: Louei Hatim Sultan al-Aris
- Minister of Provincial Affairs: Wael Abdel-Latif
- Minister of Women's Affairs: Narmin Othman
- Minister of Immigration and Refugees: Pascal Esho Warda
- Minister of Irrigation: Latif Rashid
- Minister of Labour: Leila Abdul-Latif
- Minister of Education: Sami Mudahfar
- Minister of Higher Education: Tahir Albakaa
- Minister of Agriculture: Sawsan Sherif
- Minister of Culture: Mufid Mohammad Jawad al-Jazairi
- Minister of Industry: Hajim al-Hassani
- Minister of State: Kassim Daoud
- Minister of State: Mamu Farham Othman Pirali
- Minister of State: Adnan al-Janabi

== See also ==
- Iraq Interim Governing Council
- Iraq Transitional Government

Preceded by Coalition Provisional Authority	Government of Iraq; June 28, 2004 - May 3, 2005	Succeeded by Iraqi Transitional Government
